= 1932 United States House of Representatives election in Minnesota =

- November 8, 1932
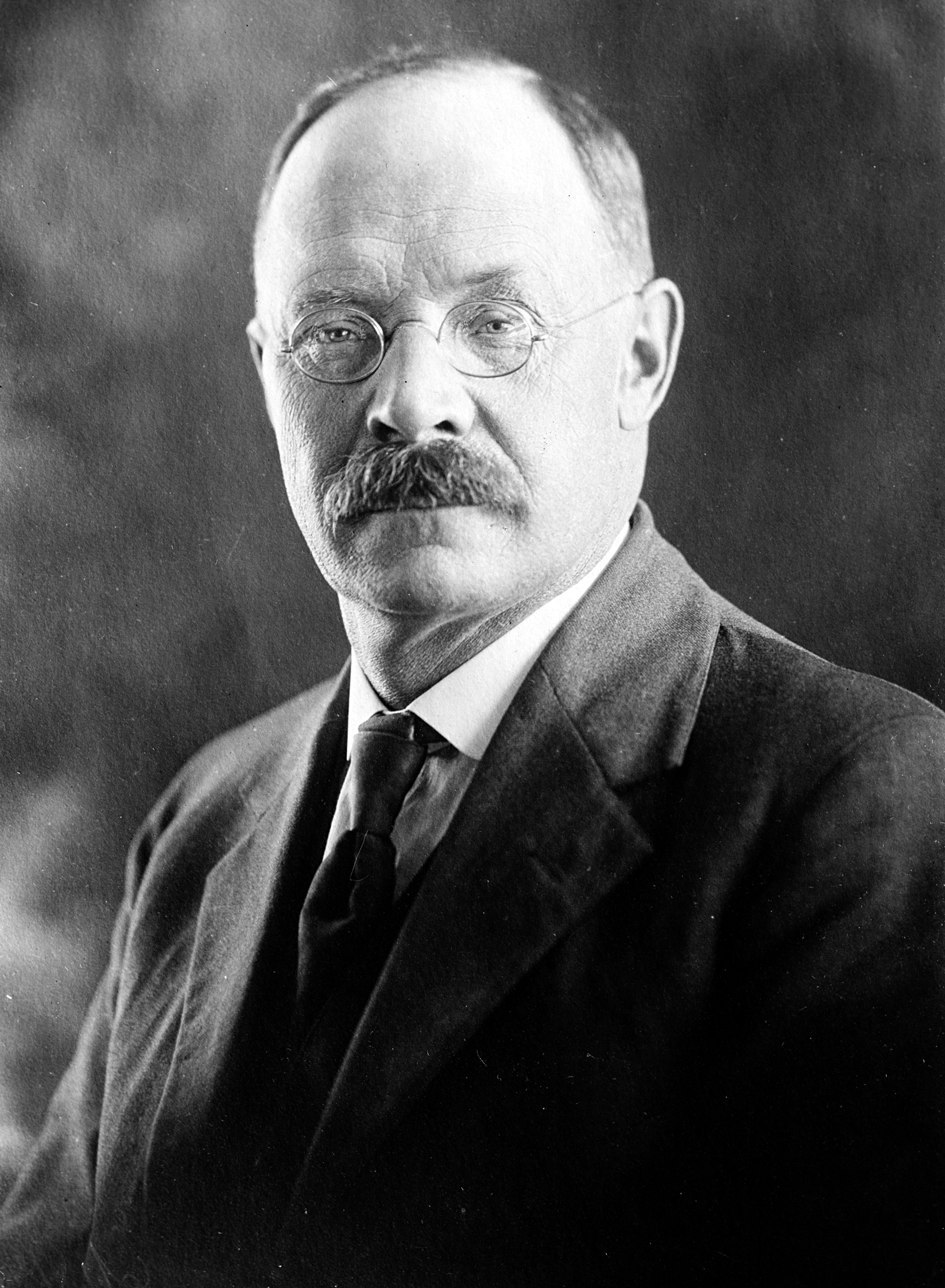

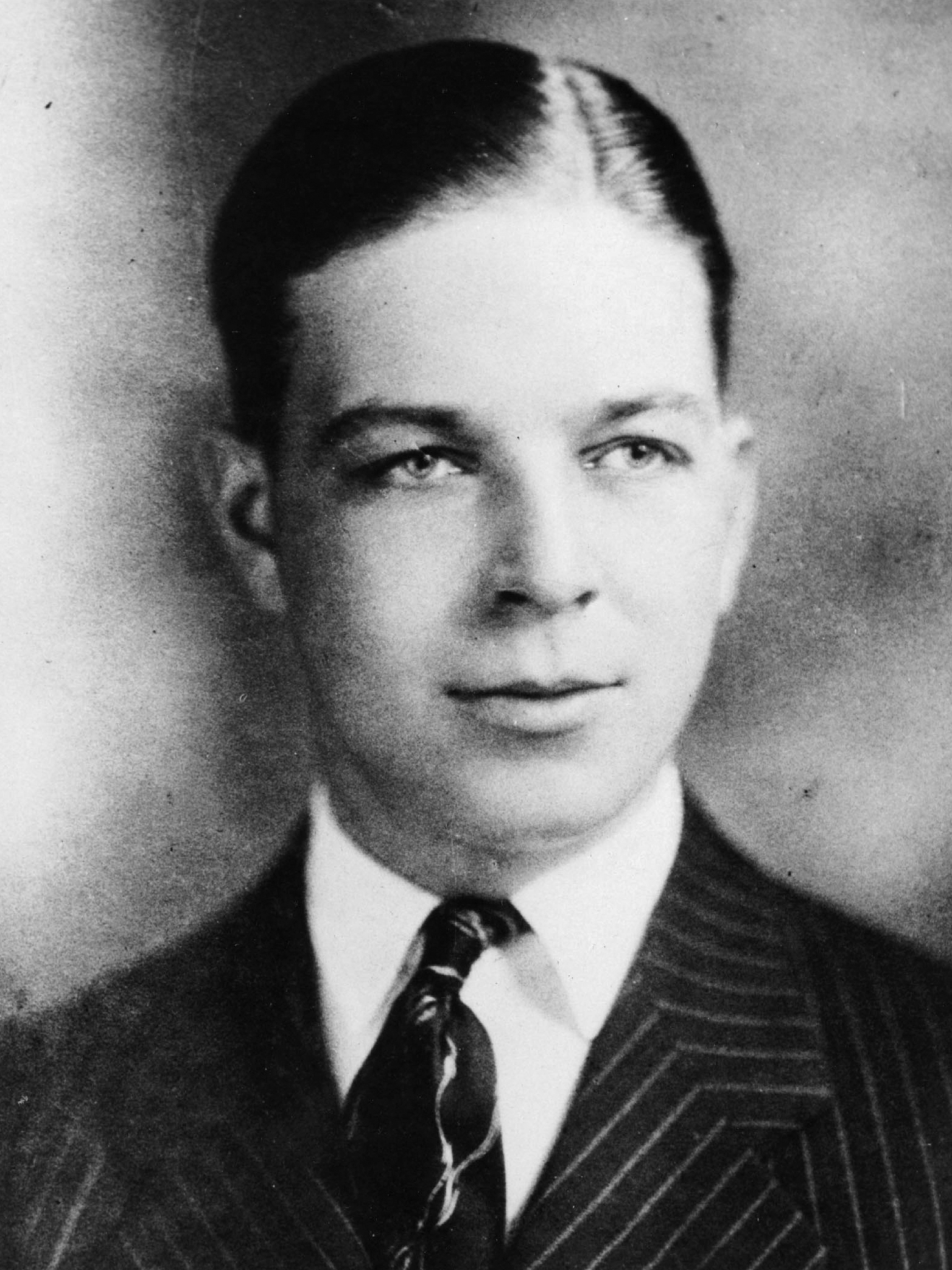

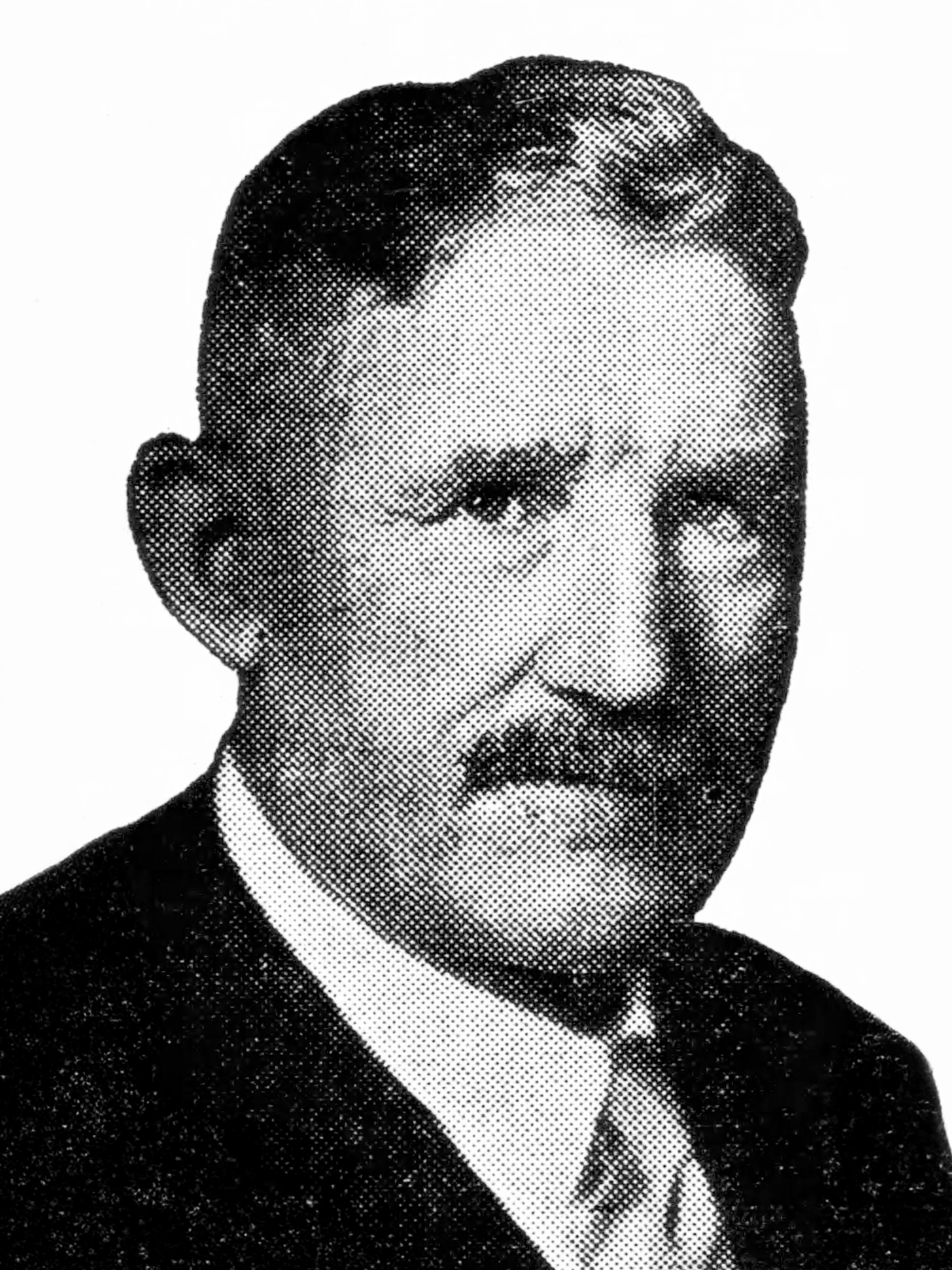

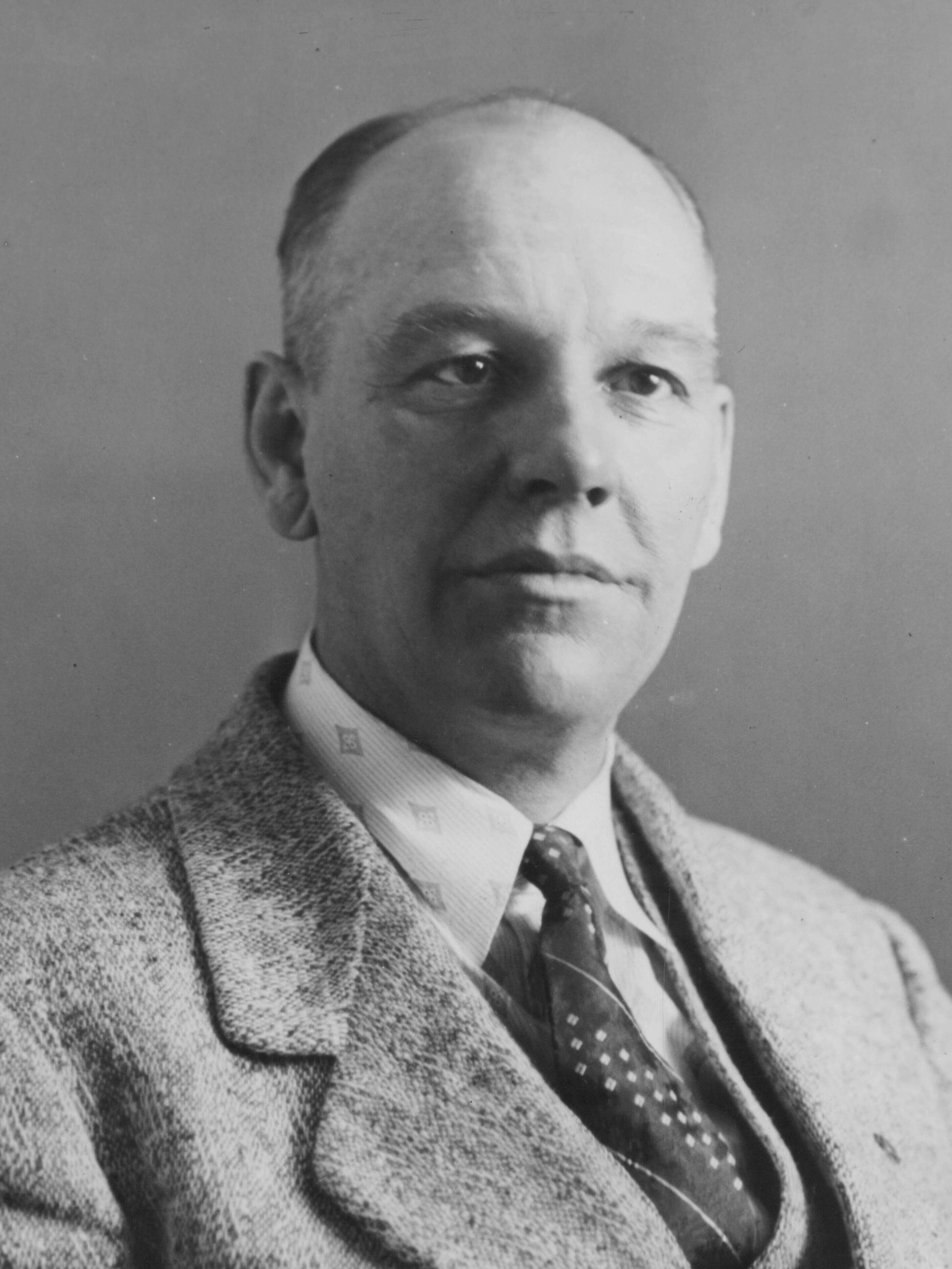

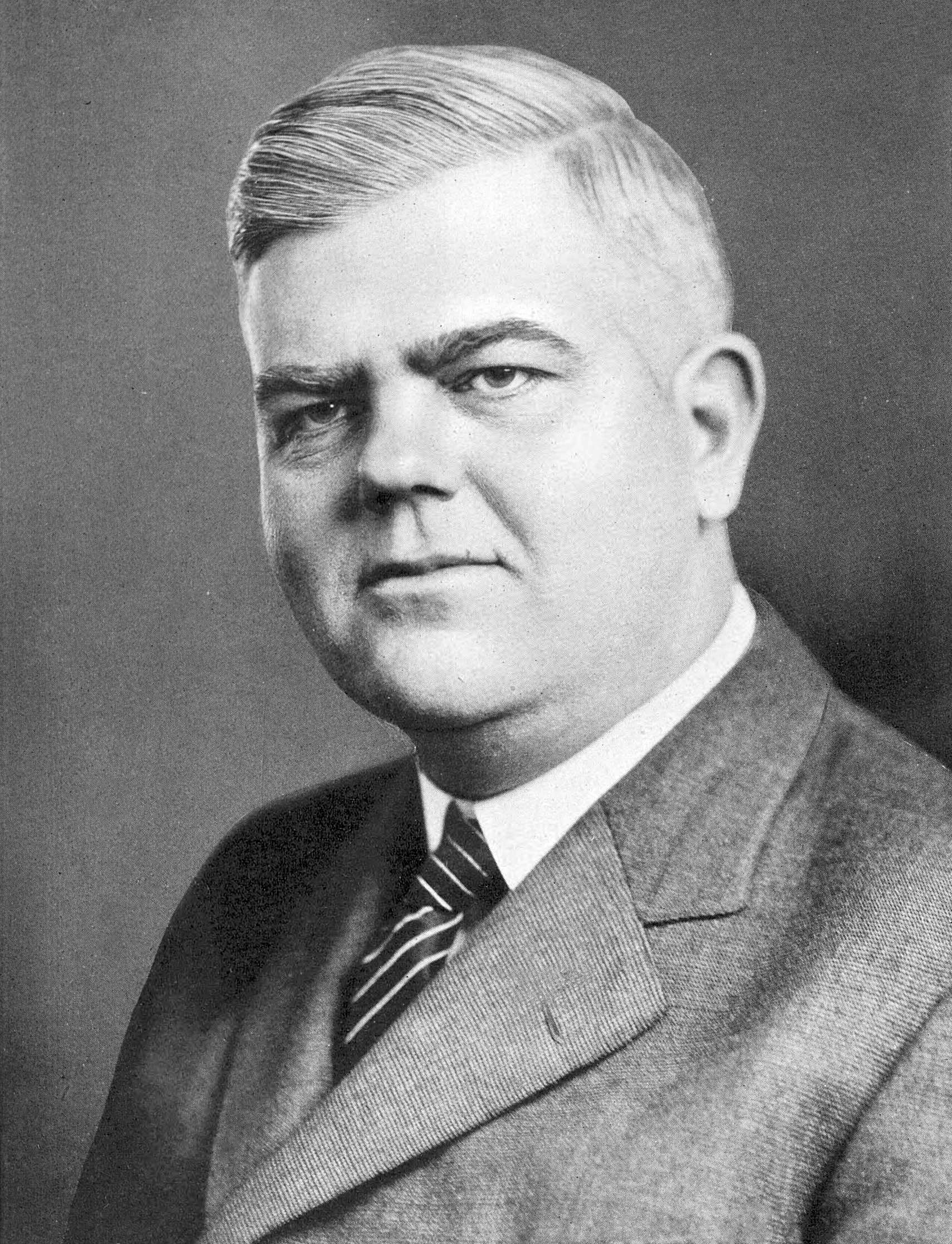

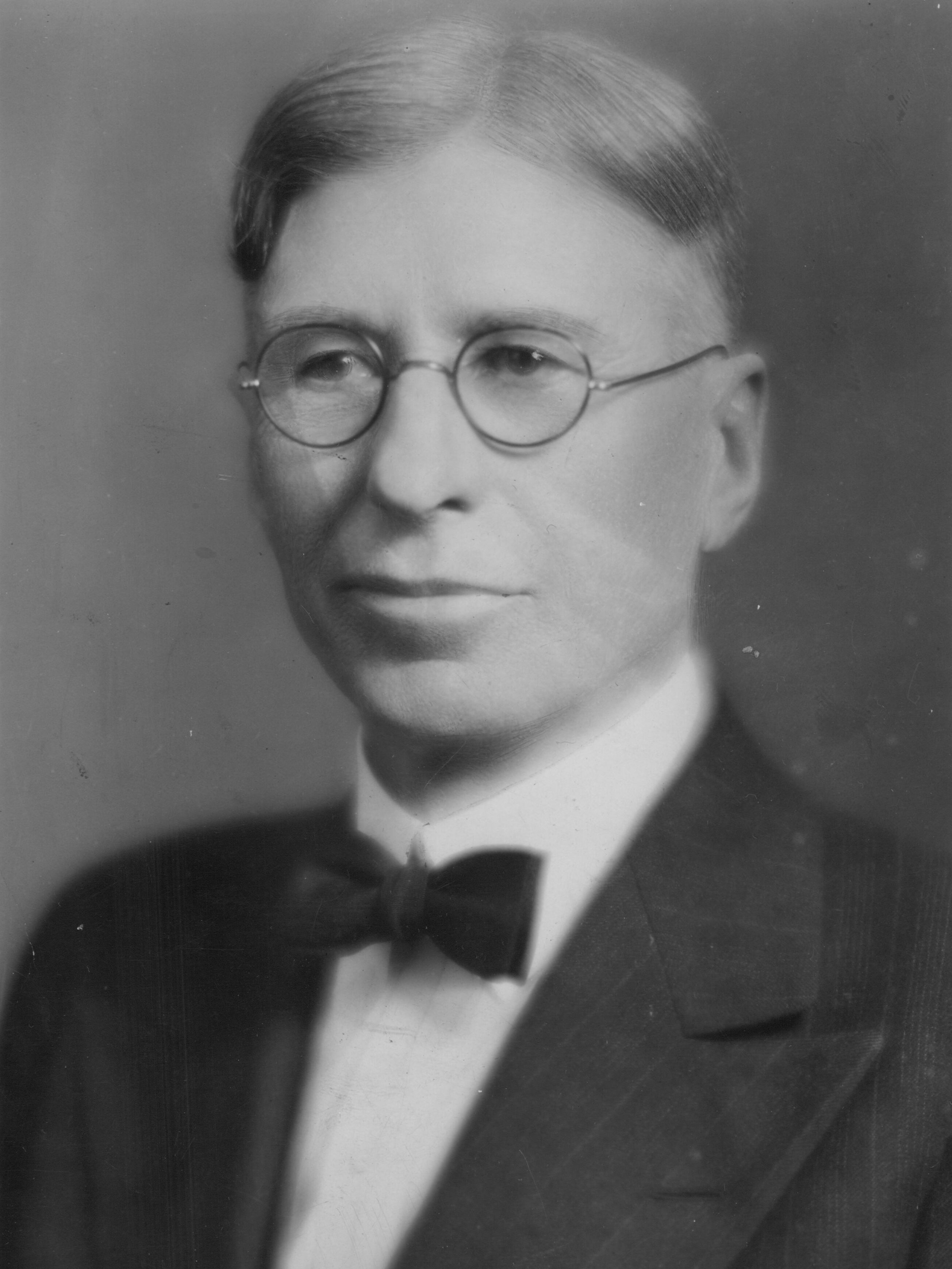

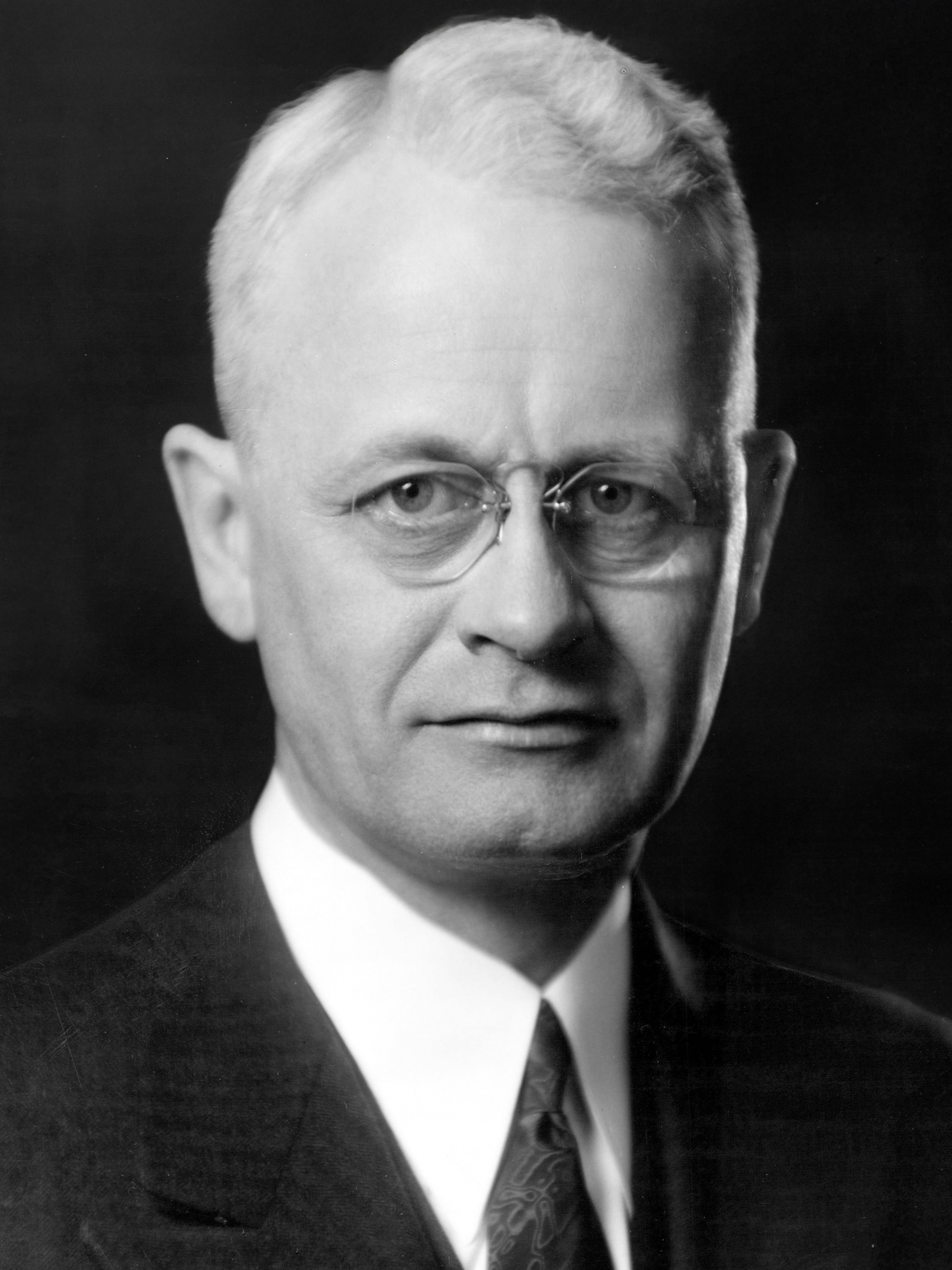

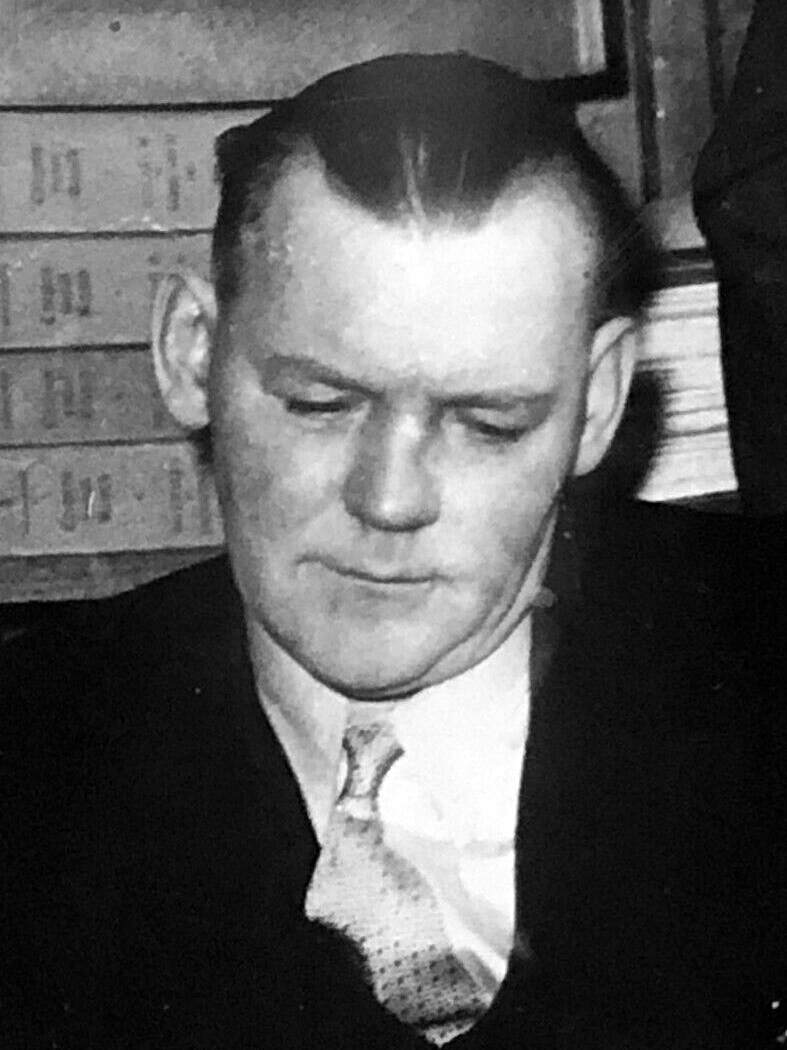

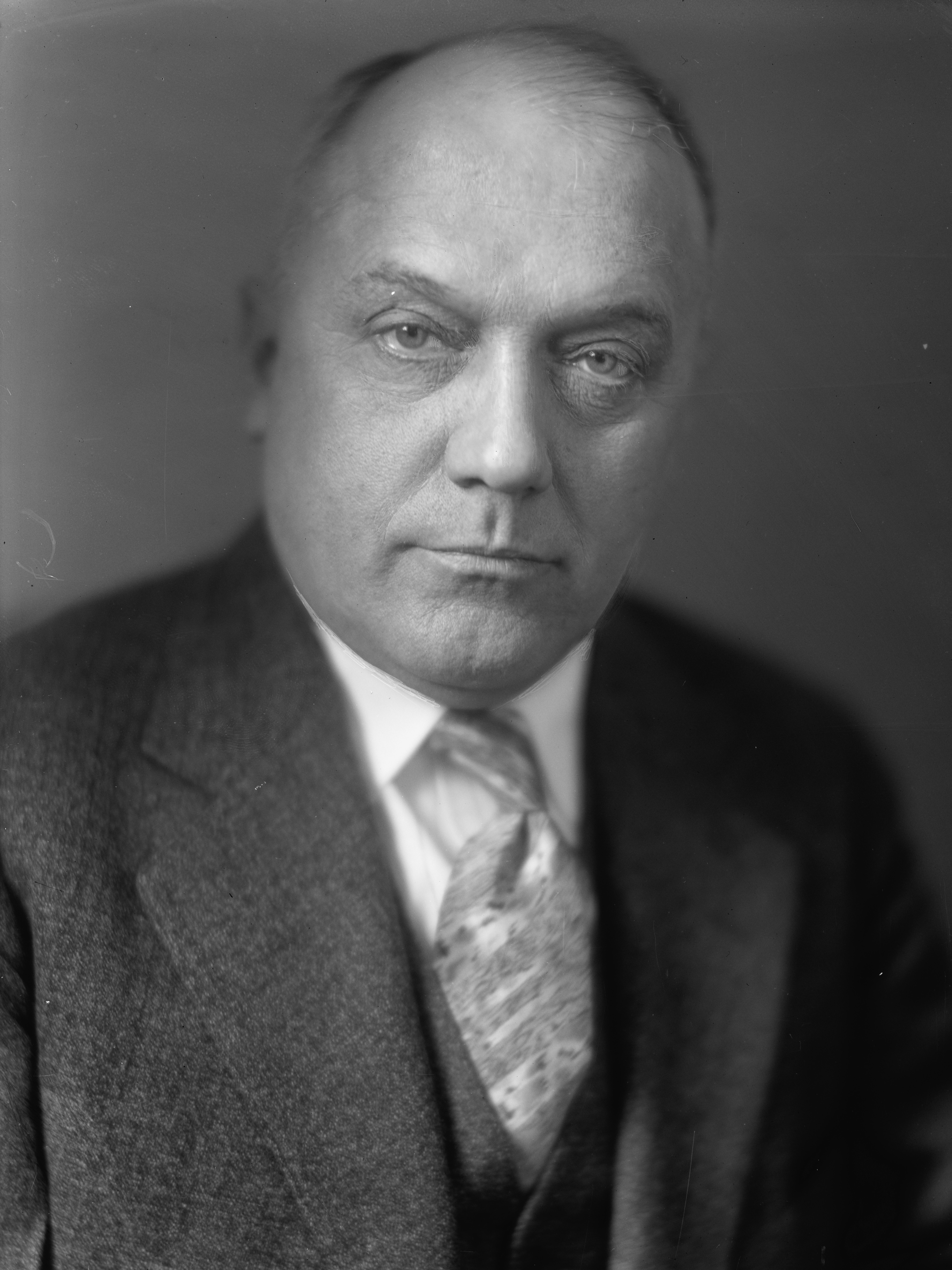
Nominee	Magnus Johnson	Paul J. Kvale	Henry M. Arens
Party	Farmer–Labor	Farmer–Labor	Farmer–Labor
Popular vote	388,616	380,444	361,724
Percentage	5.00%	4.90%	4.65%
Nominee	Ernest Lundeen	Theodore Christianson	Einar Hoidale
Party	Farmer–Labor	Republican	Democratic
Popular vote	350,455	337,110	321,949
Percentage	4.51%	4.34%	4.14%
Nominee	Ray P. Chase	Francis Shoemaker	Harold Knutson
Party	Republican	Farmer–Labor	Republican
Popular vote	321,102	317,109	313,221
Percentage	4.13%	4.08%	4.03%
U.S. Representatives before election
Victor Christgau (R)
Frank Clague (R)
August H. Andresen (R)
Melvin Maas (R)
William I. Nolan (R)
Harold Knutson (R)
Paul J. Kvale (F–L)
William Alvin Pittenger (R)
Conrad Selvig (R)
Godfrey G. Goodwin (R)
Elected U.S. Representatives
Henry M. Arens (F–L)
Einar Hoidale (D)
Ernest Lundeen (F–L)
Ray P. Chase (R)
Theodore Christianson (R)
Harold Knutson (R)
Paul J. Kvale (F–L)
Magnus Johnson (F–L)
Francis Shoemaker (F–L)

The 1932 United States House of Representatives election in Minnesota was held on November 8, 1932, to elect nine members of the U.S. House of Representatives from the state's at-large seats.

== Background ==
Minnesota's representation in the United States House of Representatives fell from ten to nine seats after the Reapportionment Act of 1929. The Minnesota Legislature, controlled by the Republican Party, passed legislation redistricting these seats in April 1931. However, Governor Floyd B. Olson, a member of the Minnesota Farmer–Labor Party, vetoed it on April 20, stating that it was a gerrymander. The 7th congressional district stretched over 175 miles across the state and Hennepin County was divided between three districts.

The legislature was unable to overturn Olson's veto. Proponents of the legislation argued that the Constitution of the United States gives redistricting power solely to the legislature and Olson, as governor, had no power over it. The Minnesota Secretary of State started accepting nominations from the new districts and rejected at-large nominations.

W. Yale Smiley filed a writ of mandamus to force the secretary of state to accept his at-large nomination. He was rejected and appealed to the Supreme Court of the United States. The Supreme Court ruled unanimously in Smiley's favor on April 11, 1932. Minnesota had to use an at-large district as the legislature was not set to convene until January 1933, and Olson refused to call a special session. Minnesota previously used an at-large seat during the 1912 election, which was won by James Manahan.

== Primary ==
88 candidates were on the primary ballots for the Democrats, Farmer–Laborers, and Republicans. This long ballot resulted in long lines at polling locations and slow counting. This was the first time in Minnesota history that women ran for seats in the U.S. House of Representatives, with Laura Emelia Naplin and Susie Stageberg seeking the Farmer–Labor nomination and Anna Dickie Olesen and Mary Brainerd seeking the Democratic nomination.

=== Farmer–Labor ===
Farmer–Labor vice chair Albert G. Bastis, state senator Lynn Thompson, and Andrew Olaf Devold reached an agreement with the Socialist Party of Minnesota. It agreed to not run candidates in all but one statewide race and endorsed the Farmer–Labor campaign under the condition that it would not do fusion with the Democrats.

=== Republican ===
Representative Frank Clague declined to seek reelection. Milo B. Price initially filed to run against Victor Christgau in the 1st congressional district.

Representatives Melvin Maas and Christgau, liberal Republicans who had conflicts with Herbert Hoover, announced that they would seek reelection, but not seek the endorsement of their district conventions. The Republican Party of Minnesota voted to endorse August H. Andresen, Harold Knutson, William Alvin Pittenger, Conrad Selvig, J.V. Weber, and Theodore Christianson at its state convention, but not Maas and Christgau.

==== Endorsements ====
August H. Andresen

Organizations

- Republican Party of Minnesota
Victor Christgau

Organizations

- Woman's Christian Temperance Union
Theodore Christianson

Organizations

- Republican Party of Minnesota
Harold Knutson

Organizations

- Republican Party of Minnesota
William Alvin Pittenger

Organizations

- Republican Party of Minnesota
Conrad Selvig

Organizations

- Republican Party of Minnesota
J.V. Weber

Organizations

- Republican Party of Minnesota

==== Results ====
Republican primary
Party	Candidate	Votes	%	±%
Republican	Theodore Christianson	139,680	8.08%	
Republican	Ray P. Chase	123,376	7.14%	
Republican	William I. Nolan (incumbent)	103,902	6.01%	
Republican	Joseph A. A. Burnquist	95,719	5.54%	
Republican	Harold Knutson (incumbent)	94,553	5.47%	
Republican	N. J. Holmberg	77,619	4.49%	
Republican	William Alvin Pittenger (incumbent)	76,665	4.43%	
Republican	Conrad Selvig (incumbent)	73,083	4.23%	
Republican	August H. Andresen (incumbent)	71,766	4.15%	
Republican	Henry Rines	70,203	4.06%	
Republican	Victor Christgau (incumbent)	68,583	3.97%	
Republican	Melvin Maas (incumbent)	68,121	3.94%	
Republican	Godfrey G. Goodwin (incumbent)	63,846	3.69%	
Republican	Elmer Adams	57,782	3.34%	
Republican	Milo B. Price	52,644	3.04%	
Republican	John H. Hougen	51,727	2.99%	
Republican	Charles A. Lund	47,618	2.75%	
Republican	Knute Knutson	44,684	2.58%	
Republican	J.V. Weber	43,168	2.50%	
Republican	Samuel A. Rask	39,121	2.26%	
Republican	Martin F. Falk	33,918	1.96%	
Republican	Louis P. Johnson	32,682	1.89%	
Republican	Hilding Alfred Swanson	32,046	1.85%	
Republican	E.F. Jacobson	30,666	1.77%	
Republican	Ed C. Cole	26,325	1.52%	
Republican	John W. Johnson	26,282	1.52%	
Republican	Orville Nelson	24,289	1.40%	
Republican	Charles J. Andre	24,040	1.39%	
Republican	Hans Yugve	22,283	1.29%	
Republican	George Reimers	17,691	1.02%	
Republican	Roy Dalfred Modeen	14,123	0.82%	
Republican	Kleve J. Flake	12,807	0.74%	
Total votes		1,728,976	100.00%	

=== Democratic ===
The Democratic Party faced internal division between the Catholic and conservative Al Smith supporters and Protestant and liberal Franklin D. Roosevelt supporters. The liberal faction supported electoral fusion with the Farmer–Laborers while the conservatives opposed it.

Einar Hoidale, Joseph Wolf, J. J. Farrell, Adolph Bremer, and Z. H. Austin led the liberal faction. John E. Regan, Ruth Haynes Carpenter, and Ray Moonan led the conservative faction.

Two state conventions were held. The conservatives held a rival convention on April 14. They opposed any fusion between the Democrats and Farmer–Laborers. This faction controlled all of the party's activities except for the delegates to the 1932 Democratic National Convention, which the liberal faction controlled.

== General ==
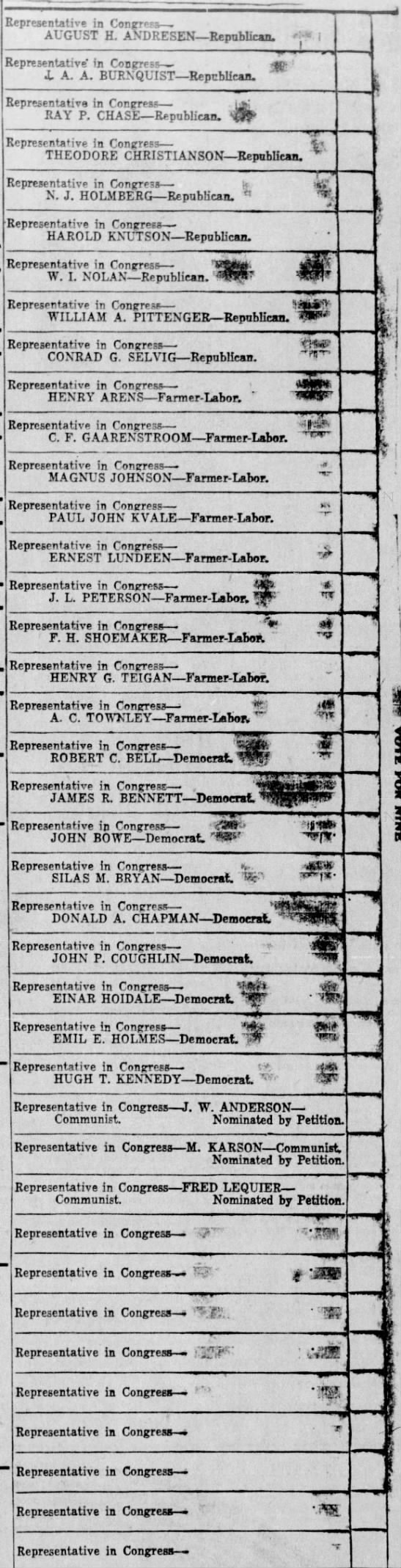
1932 Congressional Sample Ballot

Supporters of Christgau sought to draft him as a write-in candidate after losing in the Republican primary. He formally announced his write-in candidacy on September 28, and his supporters requested one million ballot stickers. He was accused of being a spoiler candidate and causing Republicans to lose.

Eight incumbents sought reelection, eight Republicans and one Farmer-Laborer. The Farmer-Laborer won reelection, but only one Republican did so. The Farmer-Labor Party won a majority of the seats and the top four recipients of vote were Farmer-Laborers.

Franklin D. Roosevelt won the state in the concurrent presidential election, the first Democrat to do so. Olson won reelection in the concurrent gubernatorial election with more votes than his party received in the U.S. House elections.

=== Endorsements ===
Victor Christgau

Individuals

- William Green, president of the American Federation of Labor

=== Results ===
1932 United States House of Representatives election in Minnesota
Party	Candidate	Votes	%	±%
Farmer–Labor	Magnus Johnson	388,616	5.00%	
Farmer–Labor	Paul J. Kvale (incumbent)	380,444	4.90%	
Farmer–Labor	Henry M. Arens	361,724	4.65%	
Farmer–Labor	Ernest Lundeen	350,455	4.51%	
Republican	Theodore Christianson	337,110	4.34%	
Democratic	Einar Hoidale	321,949	4.14%	
Republican	Ray P. Chase	321,102	4.13%	
Farmer–Labor	Francis Shoemaker	317,109	4.08%	
Republican	Harold Knutson (incumbent)	313,221	4.03%	
Republican	August H. Andresen (incumbent)	312,198	4.02%	
Republican	William I. Nolan (incumbent)	306,266	3.94%	
Republican	Conrad Selvig (incumbent)	304,846	3.92%	
Republican	Joseph A. A. Burnquist	302,356	3.89%	
Farmer–Labor	J. L. Peterson	298,331	3.84%	
Farmer–Labor	Henry Teigan	291,837	3.75%	
Farmer–Labor	C.F. Gaarenstroom	291,687	3.75%	
Republican	William Alvin Pittenger (incumbent)	291,478	3.75%	
Republican	N. J. Holmberg	287,381	3.70%	
Farmer–Labor	Arthur C. Townley	261,120	3.36%	
Democratic	Robert C. Bell	237,881	3.06%	
Democratic	John P. Coughlin	214,462	2.76%	
Democratic	Silas M. Bryan	207,419	2.67%	
Democratic	Emil E. Holmes	205,673	2.65%	
Democratic	James R. Bennett	198,421	2.55%	
Democratic	Donald A. Chapman	190,530	2.45%	
Democratic	Hugh T. Kennedy	186,466	2.40%	
Democratic	John Bowe	184,587	2.37%	
Write-In	Victor Christgau (incumbent)	82,826	1.07%	
Communist	J.W. Anderson	16,299	0.21%	
Communist	M. Karson	9,573	0.12%	
Communist	Fred Lequier	8,927	0.11%	
Write-In	Melvin Maas (incumbent)	784	0.01%	
Total votes		7,783,078	100.00%	

== Works cited ==
- Gieske, Millard (1979). Minnesota Farmer-Laborism: The Third Party Alternative. University of Minnesota Press. ISBN 0816608903.
- Moore, John; Preimesberger, Jon; Tarr, David, eds. (2001). Congressional Quarterly's Guide to U.S. Elections. Congressional Quarterly. ISBN 1-56802-602-1.
- Shumate, Roger (1933). "Minnesota's Congressional Election at Large". American Political Science Review. 27 (1). American Political Science Association: 58–63. doi:10.2307/1947345. JSTOR 1947345.
- Primary Election Returns of Election Held June 20th, 1932 (PDF). Minnesota Legislature. 1933.
