= Louis P. Johnson =

American politician (1876–1954)

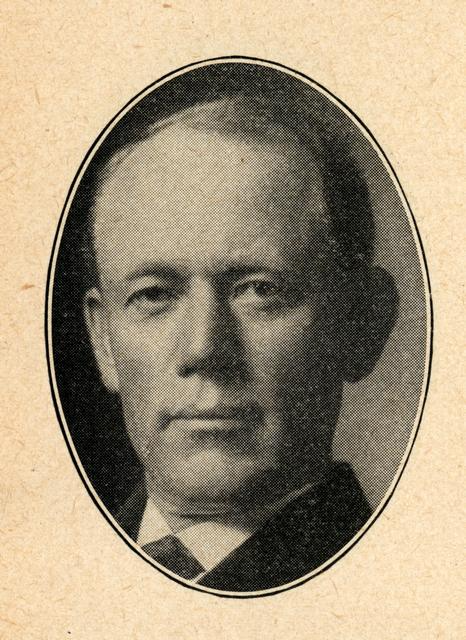

Member of the Minnesota Senate from the 12th district
- In office January 2, 1923 – January 5, 1931
- Preceded by: Floyd Lindsley
- Succeeded by: J.V. Weber

Personal details
- Born: June 30, 1876 Marshalltown, Iowa, U.S.
- Died: June 8, 1954 (aged 77)
- Party: Republican
- Spouse: Alice
- Children: 4
- Education: Lake Forest College

Louis P. Johnson (June 30, 1876 – June 8, 1954) was an American politician who served in the Minnesota Senate from 1923 to 1931. He was a member of the Republican Party.

== Early life ==
Johnson was born on a farm in Marshalltown, Iowa, on June 30, 1876, and his family moved to Lincoln County, Minnesota, in 1890. He married Alice, with whom he had four children.

Johnson graduated from Lake Forest College with a legal degree and was admitted to the Illinois State Bar Association in 1903, and Minnesota State Bar Association in 1905. He served as president of the Minnesota State Bar Association. He practiced law in Ivanhoe from 1903 to 1932, Mankato from 1932 to 1943, and Marshall from 1942 to his retirement in 1951.

Johnson served as the Lincoln County attorney from 1910 to 1918. He unsuccessfully ran to be a delegate for Albert B. Cummins from Minnesota's 2nd congressional district during the 1916 Republican primary.

== Career ==
=== State Senate ===
Johnson ran for a seat in the Minnesota Senate from the 12th district in the 1922 election. He placed first in the top-two primary, which eliminated incumbent senator Floyd Lindsley. He defeated George Gurley in the election. He narrowly defeated Charles F. Norwood in the 1926 election, in which a recount was conducted, after spending $307. He lost reelection to J.V. Weber in 1930.

During Johnson's tenure in the state senate he served on the Agriculture, Civil Administration, Finance, Game and Fish, and Judiciary committees. He chaired the Temperance and Elections committees. Johnson was a county delegate for Frank O. Lowden during the 1928 presidential campaign.

In 1927, Johnson opposed launching an investigation into allegations that Thomas D. Schall used corruption in his 1924 senatorial campaign. He was a member of the five member committee that investigated Schall. The committee unanimously supported a report ruling in favor of Schall. In 1929, Johnson made a motion to expel Senator Ambrose Leo Lennon after Lennon was convicted of violating prohibition laws, but it failed.

=== Congressional campaigns and later life ===
Johnson sought the Republican nomination in the 1932 U.S. House of Representatives election, but lost in the primary. He was the first person to file for the primary. In 1934, he defeated Paul Freidrich Dehnel for the Republican nomination in the 2nd congressional district, but placed third behind Democratic nominee Elmer Ryan and incumbent Minnesota Farmer–Labor U.S. Representative Henry M. Arens in the election. He sought the Republican nomination in the 1936 election, but lost in the primary to Christian J. Laurisch. He sought the Republican nomination in 1938, but lost in the primary to Joseph P. O'Hara. He considered running as an independent in the 1940 election, but declined to do so.

Johnson was speculated as a possible candidate for the 1928 U.S. Senate election and for lieutenant governor or governor in the 1930 election. He ran as the Republican nominee for mayor of Mankato in 1935, but lost to Frank J. Mahowald. He supported Franklin D. Roosevelt during the 1944 presidential election. He died on June 8, 1954.

== Electoral history ==
1922 Minnesota Senate 12th district election
Primary election
Party	Candidate	Votes	%
Nonpartisan	Louis P. Johnson	3,279	38.07%
Nonpartisan	George P. Gurley	2,903	33.70%
Nonpartisan	Charles F. Norwood	1,659	19.26%
Nonpartisan	Floyd Lindsley (incumbent)	773	8.97%
Total votes		8,614	100.00%
General election
Nonpartisan	Louis P. Johnson	6,152	56.95%
Nonpartisan	George P. Gurley	4,650	43.05%
Total votes		10,802	100.00%

1926 Minnesota Senate 12th district election
Party	Candidate	Votes	%
Nonpartisan	Louis P. Johnson (incumbent)	5,225	50.17%
Nonpartisan	Charles F. Norwood	5,190	49.83%
Total votes		10,415	100.00%

1930 Minnesota Senate 12th district election
Party	Candidate	Votes	%
Nonpartisan	J.V. Weber	7,102	58.89%
Nonpartisan	Louis P. Johnson (incumbent)	4,957	41.11%
Total votes		12,059	100.00%

1932 United States House of Representatives in Minnesota Republican primary
Party	Candidate	Votes	%
Republican	Theodore Christianson	139,680	8.08%
Republican	Ray P. Chase	123,376	7.14%
Republican	William I. Nolan (incumbent)	103,902	6.01%
Republican	Joseph A. A. Burnquist	95,719	5.54%
Republican	Harold Knutson (incumbent)	94,553	5.47%
Republican	N. J. Holmberg	77,619	4.49%
Republican	William Alvin Pittenger (incumbent)	76,665	4.43%
Republican	Conrad Selvig (incumbent)	73,083	4.23%
Republican	August H. Andresen (incumbent)	71,766	4.15%
Republican	Henry Rines	70,203	4.06%
Republican	Victor Christgau (incumbent)	68,583	3.97%
Republican	Melvin Maas (incumbent)	68,121	3.94%
Republican	Godfrey G. Goodwin (incumbent)	63,846	3.69%
Republican	Elmer Adams	57,782	3.34%
Republican	Milo B. Price	52,644	3.04%
Republican	John H. Hougen	51,727	2.99%
Republican	Charles A. Lund	47,618	2.75%
Republican	Knute Knutson	44,684	2.58%
Republican	J.V. Weber	43,168	2.50%
Republican	Samuel A. Rask	39,121	2.26%
Republican	Martin F. Falk	33,918	1.96%
Republican	L.P. Johnson	32,682	1.89%
Republican	Hilding Alfred Swanson	32,046	1.85%
Republican	E.F. Jacobson	30,666	1.77%
Republican	Ed C. Cole	26,325	1.52%
Republican	John W. Johnson	26,282	1.52%
Republican	Orville Nelson	24,289	1.40%
Republican	Charles J. Andre	24,040	1.39%
Republican	Hans Yugve	22,283	1.29%
Republican	George Reimers	17,691	1.02%
Republican	Roy Dalfred Modeen	14,123	0.82%
Republican	Kleve J. Flake	12,807	0.74%
Total votes		1,728,976	100.00%

1934 United States House of Representatives in Minnesota 2nd congressional district election
Party	Candidate	Votes	%
Republican	Louis P. Johnson	12,350	68.90%
Republican	Paul Freidrich Dehnel	5,575	31.10%
Total votes		17,925	100.00%
General election
Democratic	Elmer Ryan	43,677	37.23%
Farmer–Labor	Henry M. Arens (incumbent)	37,663	32.11%
Republican	Louis P. Johnson	35,968	30.66%
Total votes		117,308	100.00%

1936 United States House of Representatives in Minnesota 2nd congressional district Republican primary
Party	Candidate	Votes	%
Republican	Christian J. Laurisch	5,449	26.45%
Republican	Louis P. Johnson	4,482	21.75%
Republican	Joseph P. O'Hara	4,150	20.14%
Republican	F.J. Nenno	3,357	16.29%
Republican	Arch D. Campbell	2,305	11.19%
Republican	Paul F. Dehnel	861	4.18%
Total votes		20,604	100.00%

1938 United States House of Representatives in Minnesota 2nd congressional district Republican primary
Party	Candidate	Votes	%
Republican	Joseph P. O'Hara	15,967	51.36%
Republican	Louis P. Johnson	15,122	48.64%
Total votes		31,089	100.00%

== Works cited ==
- Moore, John; Preimesberger, Jon; Tarr, David, eds. (2001). Congressional Quarterly's Guide to U.S. Elections. Congressional Quarterly. ISBN 1-56802-602-1.
- Legislative Manual of the State of Minnesota Compiled for the Legislature of 1931 (PDF). Minnesota Legislature. 1933.
- Primary Election Returns of Election Held June 20th, 1932 (PDF). Minnesota Legislature. 1933.
- Primary Election Returns of Election Held June 18th, 1934 (PDF). Minnesota Legislature. 1935.
- Primary Election Returns of Election Held June 15th, 1936 (PDF). Minnesota Legislature. 1937.
- Primary Election Returns of Election Held June 20th, 1938 (PDF). Minnesota Legislature. 1939.
