= Elmer Ryan =

American politician

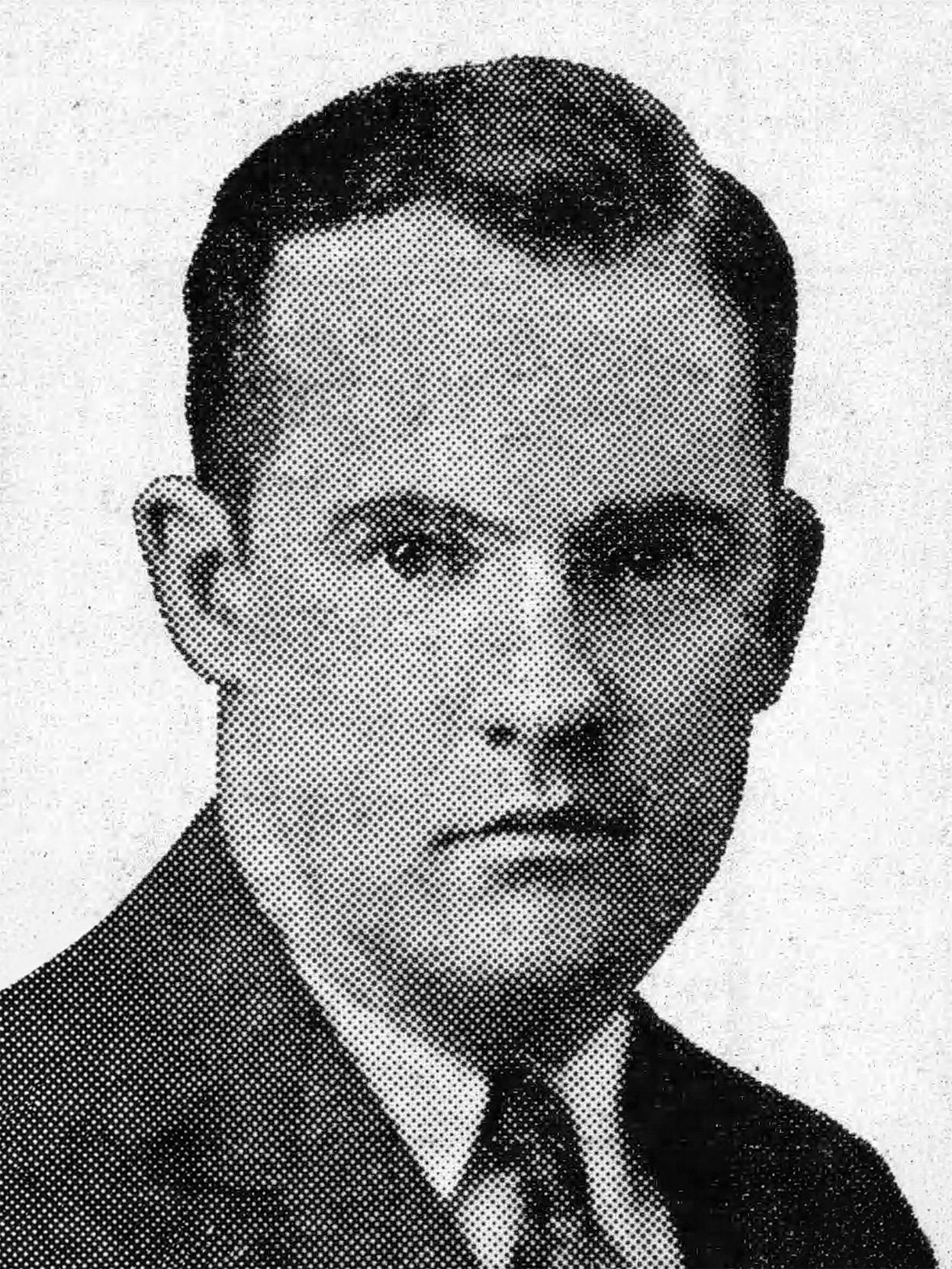
- Ryan in 1938

Member of the U.S. House of Representatives from Minnesota's 2nd district
- In office January 3, 1935 – January 3, 1941
- Preceded by: None (new seat)
- Succeeded by: Joseph P. O'Hara

Personal details
- Born: May 26, 1907 Tipton, Iowa, U.S.
- Died: February 1, 1958 (aged 50) Rosemount, Minnesota, U.S.
- Party: Democratic
- Spouse: Elenore Ford (m. 1932; died 1938) Marjorie Fuller (m. 1939)
- Children: 6

Elmer James Ryan (May 26, 1907 – February 1, 1958) was a United States representative from Minnesota.

== Early life and education ==
He was born in Rosemount, Dakota County, Minnesota, May 26, 1907. He attended the public schools, was graduated from the University of Minnesota Law School at Minneapolis in 1929, was admitted to the bar the same year and commenced practice in South St. Paul, Minnesota with Harold Stassen.

== Career ==
He was the city attorney of South St. Paul from 1933 to 1934.

He was delegate to the Democratic National Conventions in 1936 and 1940, and was elected as a Democrat to the 74th (defeating Henry Arens), 75th, and 76th Congresses (January 3, 1935 – January 3, 1941). He was an unsuccessful candidate for reelection in 1940 to the 77th Congress.

He resumed the practice of law, then entered active duty in the United States Army on June 23, 1942, as a lieutenant in the Selective Service. He was promoted to captain and transferred to the Judge Advocate General’s department, later promoted to major and was discharged on October 1, 1945. He again resumed the practice of law in South St. Paul

He died in an automobile accident on Wisconsin Highway 35, five miles north of Somerset, Wisconsin, February 1, 1958; he was interred in St. Joseph's Cemetery (Rosemount, Minnesota).

He had been married to Elenore Ford (daughter of Joseph Moravec and Cristine Kriz Moravec), who predeceased him, and they had two children, Elmer James Ryan and Jacque Ryan. Having lost his first wife in the birth of their second child, he later married Marjorie Fuller Ryan, with whom he had 4 sons, John Fuller Ryan, Geoffrey Fuller Ryan, Jeremy deMarsh Ryan, and Joseph deMarsh Ryan.

U.S. House of Representatives
Preceded by At large on a General ticket: Henry M. Arens, Ray P. Chase, Theodore Christianson, Einar Hoidale, Magnus Johnson, Harold Knutson, Paul John Kvale, Ernest Lundeen, Francis Shoemaker	U.S. Representative from Minnesota's 2nd congressional district 1935–1941	Succeeded by Joseph P. O'Hara
