= Conrad Selvig =

American politician (1877–1953)

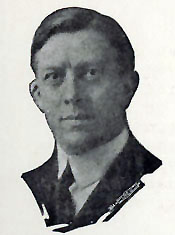

Member of the U.S. House of Representatives from Minnesota's 9th district
- In office March 4, 1927 – March 3, 1933
- Preceded by: Knud Wefald
- Succeeded by: District inactive

Personal details
- Born: October 11, 1877 Rushford, Minnesota, U.S.
- Died: August 2, 1953 (aged 75) Los Angeles, California, U.S.
- Resting place: Oakdale Cemetery, Crookston, Minnesota, U.S.
- Party: Republican

Conrad George Selvig (October 11, 1877 – August 2, 1953) was a Republican member of the United States House of Representatives.

== Biography ==
Conrad George Selvig was born in Rushford, Minnesota. He was the son of Gunder C Selvig (1842–1935) and Guri Maria Hagnestad Selvig (1845–1882), immigrants from Stavanger, Norway. His father worked for the Chicago, Milwaukee, and St. Paul Railroad. Conrad Selvig fought in the Spanish–American War as a member of the 12th Minnesota Volunteer Infantry. He graduated from Rushford High School (1895) and the University of Minnesota (1908). He worked as an educator and educational administrator for various school districts in Fillmore County, Minnesota and Crookston, Minnesota during his lifetime. In 1910, Selvig was appointed as Superintendent of the Northwest School of Agriculture in Crookston, Minnesota where he served for 17 years. He also served as president of the Minnesota Education Association (1908–1909) and the Northwestern Minnesota Education Association (1921–1922).

Selvig was a U.S. representative from Minnesota's 9th congressional district. He served in the 70th, 71st, and 72nd congresses, March 4, 1927 – March 3, 1933. He died in 1953 in Los Angeles, California and was interred in Oakdale Cemetery in Crookston, Minnesota.

== Other sources ==
- United States Congress. "Conrad Selvig (id: S000236)". Biographical Directory of the United States Congress.

U.S. House of Representatives
Preceded by Knud Wefald	Member of the U.S. House of Representatives from Minnesota's 9th congressional district March 4, 1927 – March 3, 1933	Succeeded by At large on a General ticket: Henry M. Arens, Ray P. Chase, Theodore Christianson, Einar Hoidale, Magnus Johnson, Harold Knutson, Paul John Kvale, Ernest Lundeen, Francis Shoemaker
