= Melvin Maas =

American politician and United States Marine Corps general

Melvin Joseph Maas
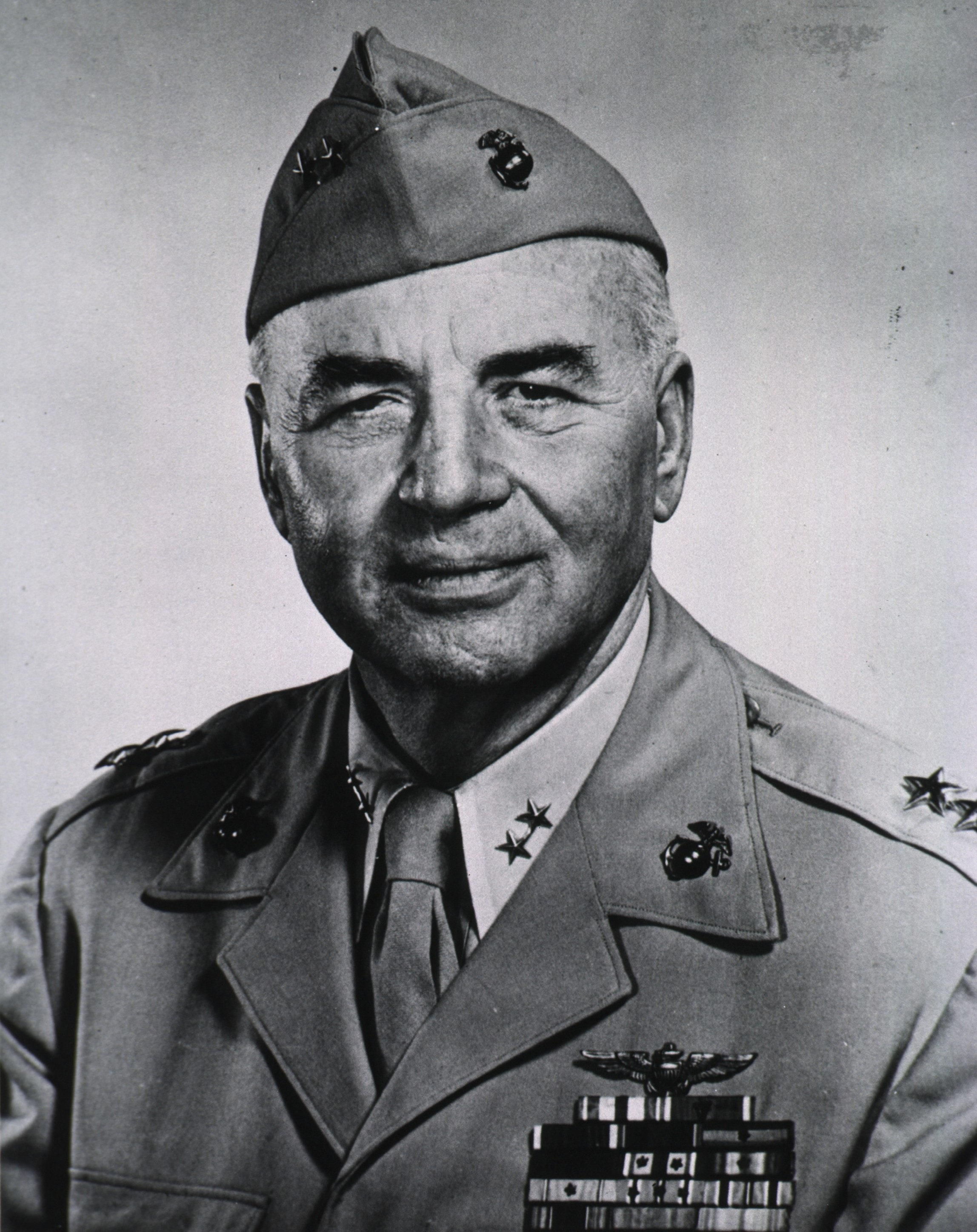
- Major General Melvin J. Maas, USMCR
- Born: May 14, 1898; Duluth, Minnesota, U.S.
- Died: April 13, 1964 (aged 65); Bethesda, Maryland, U.S.
- Burial place: Arlington National Cemetery
- Relatives: LTC Patricia Bennett, USMC (daughter)
- Military career
- Allegiance: United States of America
- Branch: United States Marine Corps
- Service years: 1917–1925, 1941-1952
- Rank: Major General
- Service number: 0-4104
- Commands: Awasa Air Base
- Conflicts: World War I World War II: Solomon Islands campaign; New Guinea campaign; Battle of Okinawa
- Awards: Silver Star; Legion of Merit; Purple Heart

Member of the U.S. House of Representatives from Minnesota's 4th district
- In office March 4, 1927 – March 3, 1933
- Preceded by: Oscar Keller
- Succeeded by: District abolished
- In office January 3, 1935 – January 3, 1945
- Preceded by: District established
- Succeeded by: Frank Starkey

Melvin Joseph Maas (May 14, 1898 – April 13, 1964) was a U.S. representative from Minnesota and decorated major general of the United States Marine Corps Reserve during World War II.

== Early years ==
Melvin Joseph Maas was born in Duluth, Minnesota, on May 14, 1898. He moved with his parents to St. Paul, Minnesota, in 1898. Educated in public schools, he enlisted in the U.S. Marine Corps on April 6, 1917, as a private. He underwent flight training and was designated a Naval aviator in the Marine Corps. He served briefly in Haiti and, during World War I, flew reconnaissance missions over the Atlantic Ocean while stationed in the Azores.

== Political career ==
After the war, Maas served with the Marine Corps until 1925, when he received a Marine Corps commission and left active service, subsequently transferring to the Marine Corps Reserve. During that time, he also finished his studies at St. Thomas College in St. Paul and graduated in 1919. Maas later attended the University of Minnesota in Minneapolis and subsequently joined his brothers in the insurance business.

During Prohibition, Maas became involved in the anti-Prohibition platform, calling for the modification of Prohibition to allow beer and wine drinking.

He subsequently ran for Congress in 1926 and defeated incumbent Oscar Keller. He became the youngest member of Congress at age twenty-eight on November 2, 1926. Maas was subsequently elected as a Republican to the 70th, 71st, and 72nd Congresses (March 4, 1927 – March 3, 1933). He ran unsuccessfully for renomination in 1932.

=== A Gunman in the House Gallery ===
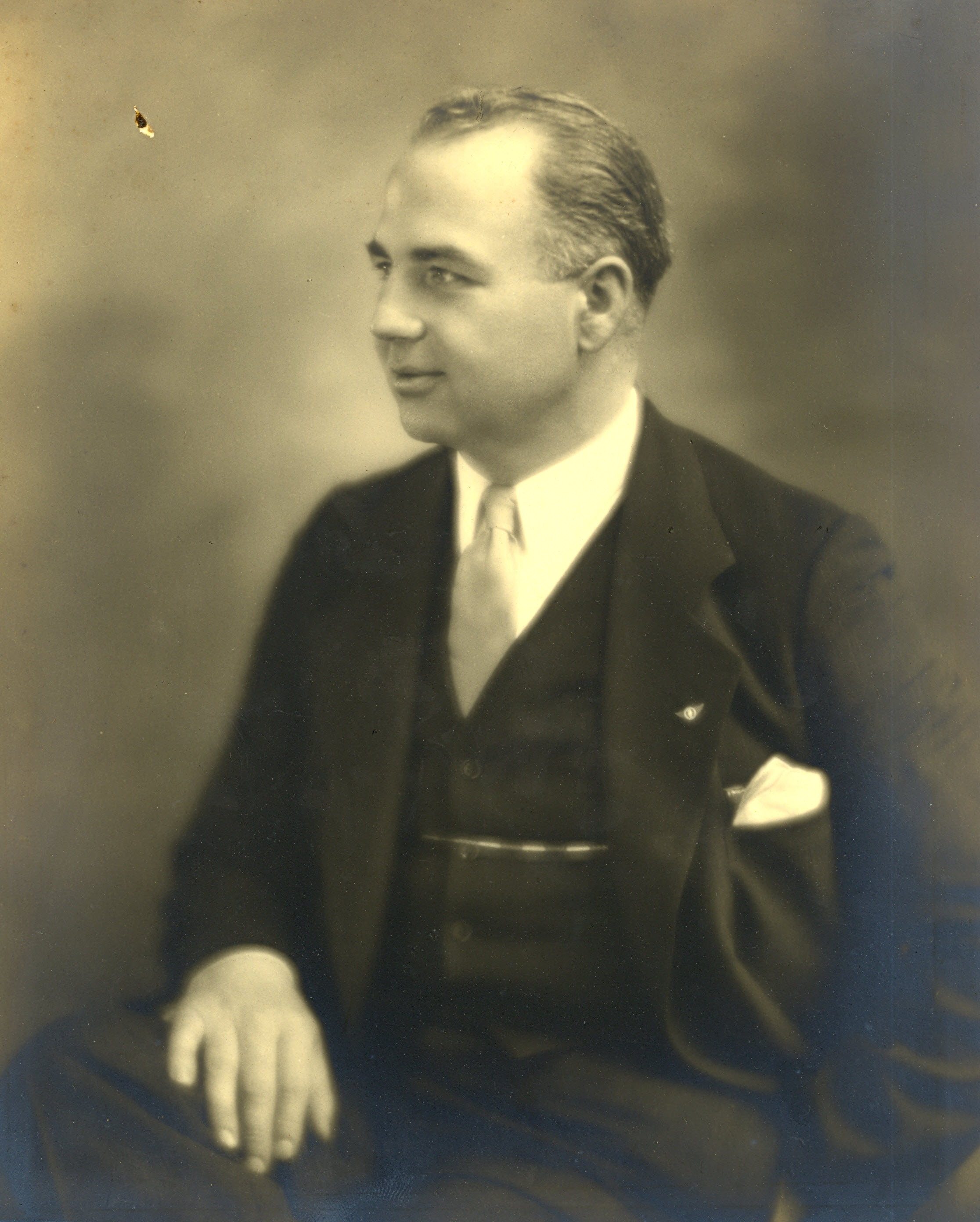
Maas as a Member of the U.S. House of Representatives

On December 13, 1932, a 25-year-old department store clerk, Marlin Kemmerer, from Allentown, Pennsylvania, pulled a gun in the House visitors' gallery and demanded to address the House regarding the nation's economic depression.

As members fled the chamber, Maas stood his ground and shouted to the man that no one was allowed to speak in the House while carrying a weapon and demanded that he throw it down. The man did so, was promptly arrested, and escorted from the House Chamber by police. For this act of courage, Maas received the Carnegie Medal.

Maas was re-elected to the 74th, 75th, 76th, 77th, and 78th Congresses (January 3, 1935 – January 3, 1945). During the 1930s, Maas served as Commander of the Reserve Marine Squadron in Minneapolis, Minnesota.

As a Marine Corps Reservist, Mass maintained proficiency as an Aviator at NRAB Minneapolis, flying with VO-6MR. On 24 September 1938, FF-2, BuNo 9365 was damaged beyond economical repair during a regularly scheduled training flight. With Col. Melvin J. Maas at the controls, the aircraft suffered strike damage after hitting a bump on the runway during takeoff from NRAB Minneapolis. The aircraft became airborne with insufficient flying speed and settled back to the ground with the left wheel collapsing. The right wheel also collapsed, and the left wingtip dug into the ground, causing the aircraft to nose up to a nearly vertical orientation before settling upright. Maas received minor cuts and bruises while passenger, Pvt. S. Jaroseak, Jr. was unhurt. The aircraft suffered major damage to the engine and cowling and was stricken as a result.

== World War II ==
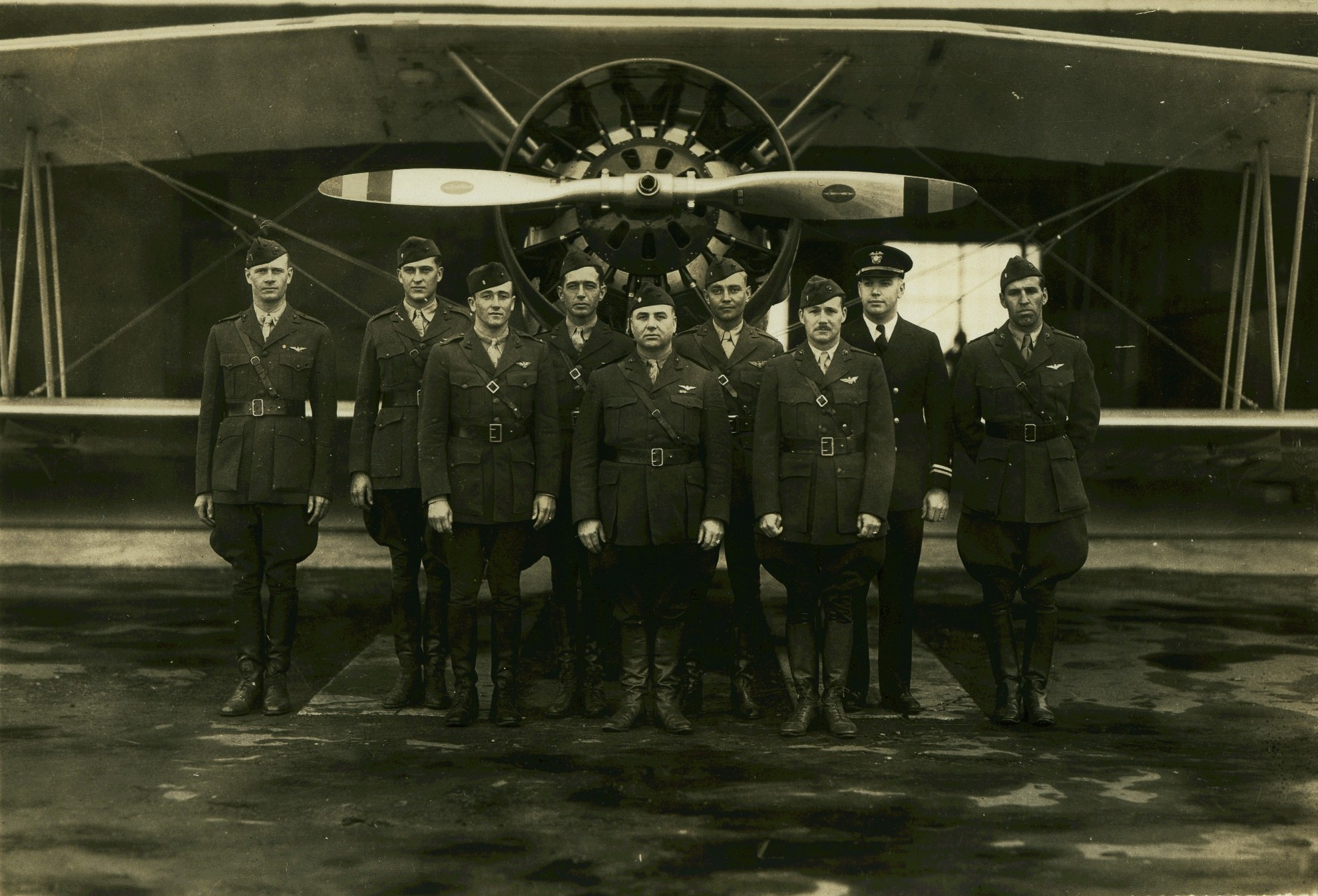
USMCR Squadron, Minneapolis, Minnesota, Melvin J. Maas in the center, c. 1931

During World War II, Maas was recalled to active service as a Colonel and assigned to the staff of Admiral William Halsey Jr. in the summer of 1941. He was later transferred to the staff of Vice Admiral Frank J. Fletcher, commander of Task Force 17. Maas later participated in the Solomon Islands campaign with that unit.

He was later transferred to the staff of the South West Pacific Area Commander, General Douglas MacArthur, where he was appointed Marine Corps observer. Maas served under MacArthur in Australia and later participated in the New Guinea campaign.

During the final phase of the Battle of Milne Bay at the beginning of September 1942, Maas volunteered as an observer and auxiliary gunner on a bomber plane for a reconnaissance mission. During the eight-hour flight, he helped disable an enemy airdrome and participated in dropping food and supplies to an isolated US Army outpost. For his efforts during the mission, Maas was decorated by the army with the Silver Star on September 3, 1942.

Maas continued to serve in the South Pacific until the fall of 1942, when he was ordered back to the United States for further duty in Congress. He was an unsuccessful candidate for reelection in 1944 to the 79th Congress and returned to active duty with the Marine Corps. He later participated in the Battle of Okinawa and was appointed commander of Awasa Air Base in May 1945. In this capacity, Maas was decorated with the Legion of Merit with Combat "V" for his efforts as base commander. He was subsequently wounded by an enemy bomb in the face. This caused permanent damage to his optic nerve that later led to his total blindness.

== Postwar career ==
Maas was a special advisor to the House Naval Affairs Committee in 1946. From 1947 to 1951, he was assistant to the chairman of the board of the Sperry Corporation in New York City. He retired from the Marine Corps on August 1, 1952, at the rank of major general.

In 1949, he became a member of the President's Committee on Employment of the Physically Handicapped; he served as chairman from 1954 to 1964. He had been stricken with total blindness in August 1951.

Maas was a resident of Chevy Chase, Maryland, until his death in Bethesda, Maryland, on April 13, 1964. He is buried in Arlington National Cemetery.

== Decorations ==
Here is the ribbon bar of Major General Melvin J. Maas:

Naval Aviator Badge
1st Row	Silver Star		Legion of Merit with Combat "V"	
2nd Row	Purple Heart	Navy Presidential Unit Citation with one star	Reserve Special Commendation Ribbon	Reserve Good Conduct Medal with two stars
3rd Row	Haitian Campaign Medal	World War I Victory Medal with aviation clasp	American Defense Service Medal with Base Clasp	Asiatic-Pacific Campaign Medal with three service stars
4th Row	American Campaign Medal	World War II Victory Medal	Marine Corps Reserve Ribbon	Armed Forces Reserve Medal

== Papers ==
Correspondence, reports, photographs, diaries, and professional papers are available for research use.

U.S. House of Representatives
Preceded by Oscar Keller	U.S. Representative from Minnesota's 4th congressional district March 4, 1927 – March 3, 1933	Succeeded by At large on a General ticket: Henry M. Arens, Ray P. Chase, Theodore Christianson, Einar Hoidale, Magnus Johnson, Harold Knutson, Paul John Kvale, Ernest Lundeen, Francis Shoemaker
Preceded by At large on a General ticket: Henry M. Arens, Ray P. Chase, Theodore Christianson, Einar Hoidale, Magnus Johnson, Harold Knutson, Paul John Kvale, Ernest Lundeen, Francis Shoemaker	U.S. Representative from Minnesota's 4th congressional district January 3, 1935 – January 3, 1945	Succeeded by Frank Starkey
