= August H. Andresen =

American politician

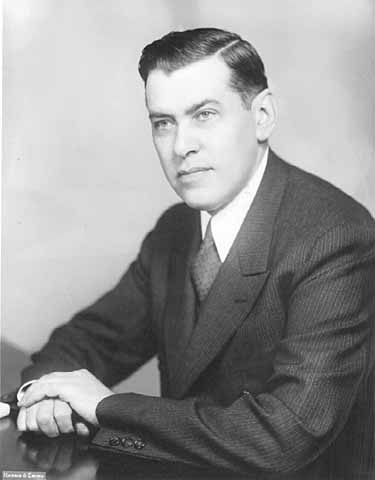
- Official portrait of Andresen; 1936

Member of the U.S. House of Representatives from Minnesota's 1st district
- In office January 3, 1935 – January 14, 1958
- Preceded by: District inactive
- Succeeded by: Al Quie

Member of the U.S. House of Representatives from Minnesota's 3rd district
- In office March 4, 1925 – March 3, 1933
- Preceded by: Charles Russell Davis
- Succeeded by: District inactive

Personal details
- Born: October 11, 1890 Newark, Illinois, U.S.
- Died: January 14, 1958 (aged 67) Bethesda, Maryland, U.S.
- Resting place: Oakwood Cemetery, Red Wing, Minnesota, U.S.
- Party: Republican

August Herman Andresen (October 11, 1890 – January 14, 1958) was an American lawyer and politician from Minnesota. He served in the U.S. Congress as a Republican for thirty-one years.

== Background ==
August Herman Andresen was born in Newark, Illinois, to Reverend Ole and Anna Andresen. He graduated from St. Olaf College in 1912 and William Mitchell College of Law (then the St. Paul College of Law) in 1914.

== Career ==
Andresen was first elected to Congress in 1925, serving the third district from 1925 to 1933, in the 69th, 70th, 71st, and 72nd congresses, and the first district from 1935 to 1958, in the 74th, 75th, 76th, 77th, 78th, 79th, 80th, 81st, 82nd, 83rd, 84th, and 85th congresses.

In 1947-8, he served on the Herter Committee.

By 1948, Andresen was the ranking member of the House Agriculture Committee. In 1952, Andresen had been one of President Dwight D. Eisenhower's finalists for Secretary of Agriculture, but Andresen declined to give up his seat. Andresen voted in favor of the Civil Rights Act of 1957.

== Personal life and death ==
In 1914 he married Julia Lien.

August H. Andresen died age 67 on January 14, 1958. He is buried in Oakwood Cemetery in Red Wing, Minnesota.

== See also ==
- List of members of the United States Congress who died in office (1950–1999)

U.S. House of Representatives
Preceded by Charles Russell Davis	U.S. Representative from Minnesota's 3rd congressional district 1925 – 1933	Succeeded by At large on a General ticket: Henry M. Arens, Ray P. Chase, Theodore Christianson, Einar Hoidale, Magnus Johnson, Harold Knutson, Paul John Kvale, Ernest Lundeen, Francis Shoemaker
Preceded by At large on a General ticket: Henry M. Arens, Ray P. Chase, Theodore Christianson, Einar Hoidale, Magnus Johnson, Harold Knutson, Paul John Kvale, Ernest Lundeen, Francis Shoemaker	U.S. Representative from Minnesota's 1st congressional district 1935 – 1958	Succeeded by Al Quie
