= 1934 United States Senate election in Minnesota =

- November 6, 1934
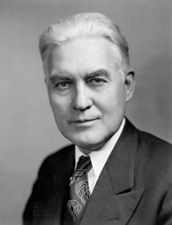

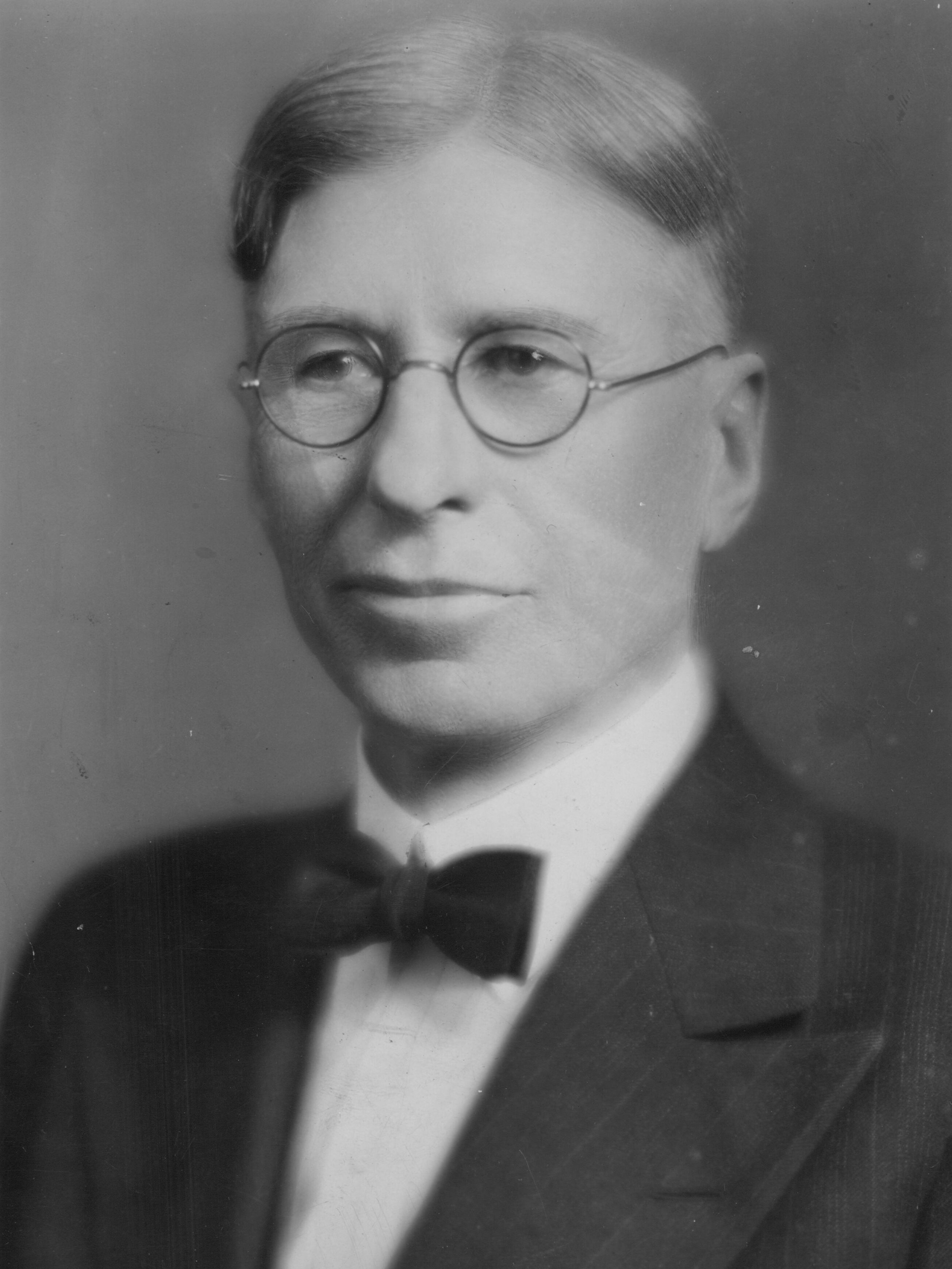

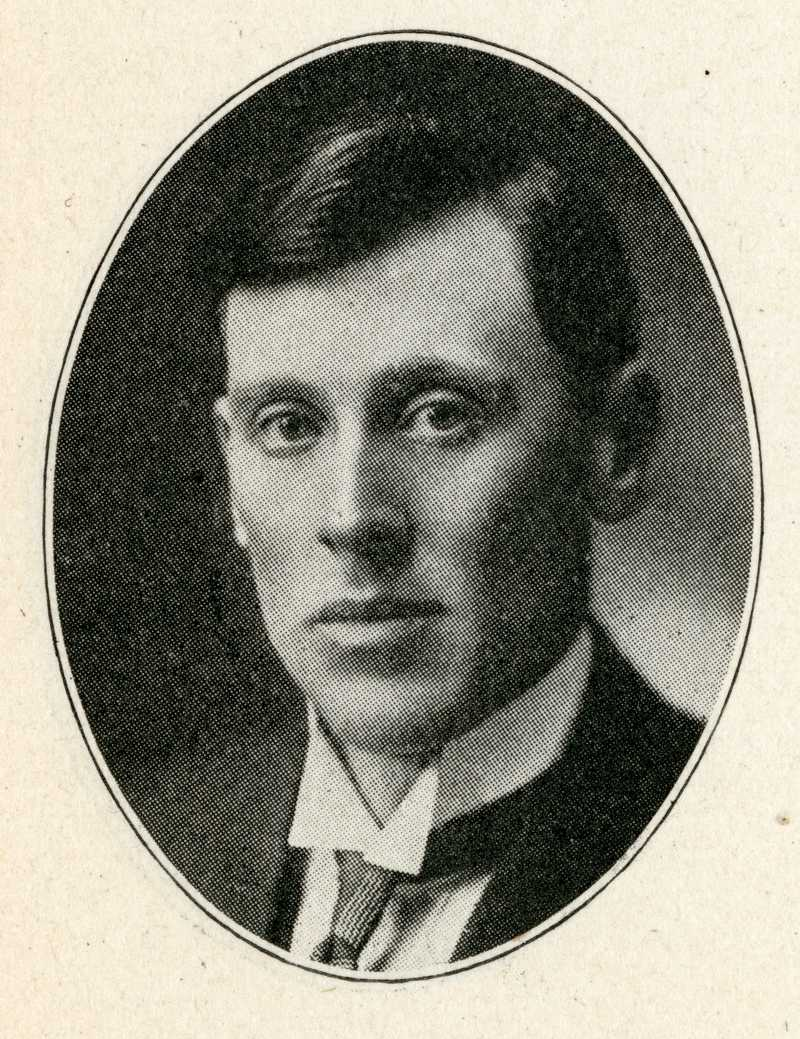
Nominee	Henrik Shipstead	Einar Hoidale	N. J. Holmberg
Party	Farmer–Labor	Democratic	Republican
Popular vote	503,379	294,757	200,083
Percentage	49.87%	29.20%	19.82%
County results
Shipstead
30–40%
40–50%
50–60%
60–70%
70–80%
Hoidale
30–40%
40–50%
50–60%
Holmberg
30–40%
U.S. senator before election
Henrik Shipstead
Farmer–Labor
Elected U.S. Senator
Henrik Shipstead
Farmer–Labor

The 1934 United States Senate election in Minnesota took place on November 6, 1934. Incumbent Farmer–Labor U.S. Senator Henrik Shipstead defeated former State Senator Nathaniel J. Holmberg of the Republican Party of Minnesota and U.S. Representative Einar Hoidale of the Minnesota Democratic Party to win a third term.

== Democratic primary ==
=== Candidates ===
==== Declared ====
- Einar Hoidale, U.S. Representative since 1933, Minneapolis attorney, former state Commissioner of Agriculture, Dairy and Food, former prosecuting attorney of Brown County (1900–1906), former judge advocate of the state militia (1900–1908), Democratic candidate for Minnesota's 5th Congressional District in 1910 and 1912, Democratic nominee for the 5th CD in 1929, Democratic nominee for the U.S. Senate in 1930
- Lewis Lohmann, St. Paul attorney, former state American Legion commander

=== Results ===
Democratic primary election results
Party	Candidate	Votes	%
Democratic	Einar Hoidale	169,651	71.37%
Democratic	Lewis Lohmann	68,066	28.63%
Total votes		237,717	100.00%

== Farmer–Labor primary ==
=== Candidates ===
==== Declared ====
- Henrik Shipstead, Incumbent U.S. Senator since 1923
- Francis H. Shoemaker, U.S. Representative since 1933, independent candidate for Minnesota's 8th Congressional District in 1934, resident of Red Wing, former newspaper editor and publisher

=== Results ===
Farmer–Labor primary election results
Party	Candidate	Votes	%
Farmer–Labor	Henrik Shipstead (Incumbent)	198,151	73.57%
Farmer–Labor	Francis H. Shoemaker	71,172	26.43%
Total votes		269,323	100.00%

== Republican primary ==
=== Candidates ===
==== Declared ====
- Tom Davis, Minneapolis attorney, former publisher, former Marshall County Attorney, former mayor of Marshall (1910–1913), former state Representative from the 13th House District (1917–1919), Farmer-Labor nominee for Attorney General in 1918, Farmer-Labor candidate for governor in 1924 and 1926
- N. J. Holmberg, former state senator from the 23rd District (1915–1919) and state representative from the 22nd House District (1907–1915), farmer from Renville, former state Commissioner of Agriculture (1919–1931), candidate for governor in 1930, nominee for an at-large U.S. House seat in 1932

=== Results ===
Republican primary election results
Party	Candidate	Votes	%
Republican	N. J. Holmberg	85,534	54.68%
Republican	Tom Davis	70,879	45.32%
Total votes		156,413	100.00%

== General election ==
=== Candidates ===
==== Communist ====
- Alfred Tiala, resident of Waterville, national secretary of the United Farmers' League, nominated by petition

==== Socialist ====
- Morris Kaplan, businessman from Bemidji, former mayor of Bemidji, Public Ownership nominee for Minnesota's 8th Congressional District in 1912, nominated by petition

=== Results ===
General election results
Party	Candidate	Votes	%
Farmer–Labor	Henrik Shipstead (Incumbent)	503,379	49.87%
Democratic	Einar Hoidale	294,757	29.20%
Republican	N. J. Holmberg	200,083	19.82%
Communist	Alfred Tiala	5,620	0.56%
Socialist	Morris Kaplan	5,616	0.56%
Total votes		1,009,455	100.00%
Majority		208,622	20.67%
Farmer–Labor hold			

== See also ==
- United States Senate elections, 1934
