= Laura Emelia Naplin =

American politician (1893–1985)

Member of the Minnesota State Senate from the 65th district
- In office 1927 – 1934

Personal details
- Born: February 14, 1893
- Died: 1985 (aged 91–92) Oakland, California
- Party: Farmer–Labor Party
- Occupation: Politician

Laura Emelia Naplin (née Johnson; February 14, 1893 – 1985) was an American politician who served as a member of the Minnesota State Senate from 1927 to 1934.

== Biography ==
Naplin was born on February 14, 1893, to Mr. and Mrs. A. C. McMullen. She worked as a teacher in Thief River Falls for nine years. Naplin was first elected to the Minnesota State Senate in a special election after her husband, Oscar Albert Naplin, died while in office. She was the first woman to serve in the state Senate. She was subsequently reelected in 1930, but did not run in the 1934 election. In 1940, she unsuccessfully ran for a seat on the United States Senate. After her defeat, she moved to California, where she lived until her death in 1985.
