= H. Carl Andersen =

American politician (1897–1978)

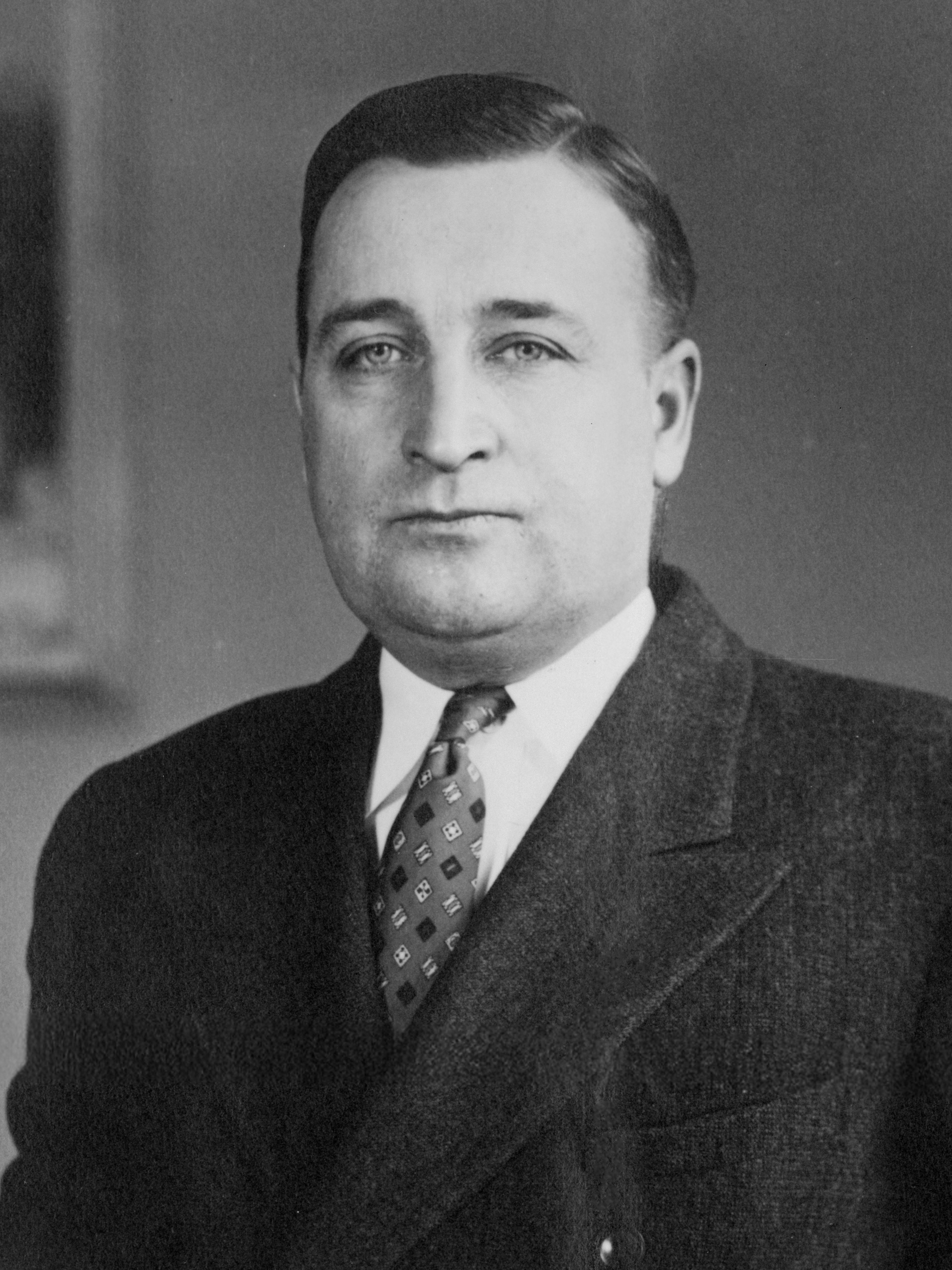

Member of the U.S. House of Representatives from Minnesota's 7th district
- In office January 3, 1939 – January 3, 1963
- Preceded by: Paul John Kvale
- Succeeded by: Alec G. Olson (redistricting)

Member of the Minnesota House of Representatives from the 12th District
- In office January 8, 1935 – January 4, 1937

Personal details
- Born: Herman Carl Andersen; January 27, 1897 Newcastle, Washington, US
- Died: July 26, 1978 (aged 81) Falls Church, Virginia, US
- Party: Republican

Herman Carl Andersen (January 27, 1897 – July 26, 1978) was a U.S. representative from Minnesota.

== Background ==
Herman Carl Andersen was born in Newcastle, Washington. He was the son of Charles Carl Andersen (1858–1940?) and Lorena Nielson (1868–1946). Charles C. Andersen had emigrated from Denmark to the United States in the late 1870s. The family moved to a farm near Tyler, Minnesota in 1901. Andersen's father returned to mining and became superintendent of a large coal mine owned by Northern Pacific Railway at Red Lodge, Montana, where Andersen graduated from high school in 1913. He attended the University of Washington and later the U.S. Naval Academy. While aboard the battleship USS Wyoming (BB-32) in 1917, a gun blast partially impaired his hearing and he was unable to qualify for further service.

== Career ==
Andersen engaged in cattle raising and agricultural pursuits 1919 – 1925 and as a civil engineer 1925 – 1930. From 1926 to 1928 he was employed in the Muscle Shoals, Alabama. He resumed agricultural pursuits near Tyler, Minnesota, 1930 – 1938. He served as member of the Minnesota House of Representatives for one term from 1935 to 1937. He was elected as a Republican to the 76th, 77th, 78th, 79th, 80th, 81st, 82nd, 83rd, 84th, 85th, 86th and 87th congresses from 1939 to 1963. Andersen voted in favor of the Civil Rights Acts of 1957 and 1960, but voted present on the 24th Amendment to the U.S. Constitution.

In the 1962 election, his district was eliminated as part of redistricting. He also faced backlash from the Republican party related to a business deal with fraudster Billie Sol Estes. He lost the Republican primary election to Robert J. Odegard (who in turn lost to Democrat Alec G. Olson in the general election) and did not return to politics.

== Later years ==
After leaving politics, Andersen retired to Falls Church, Virginia where he ran a small business and managed his farming interests in Minnesota. He died in 1978. He was cremated and his ashes interred in Danebod Lutheran Cemetery in Tyler, Minnesota.

== See also ==
- Minnesota's congressional delegations

U.S. House of Representatives
Preceded by Paul John Kvale	U.S. Representative from Minnesota's 7th congressional district 1939 – 1963	Succeeded by Odin Langen
