= Francis Shoemaker =

American politician (1889–1958)

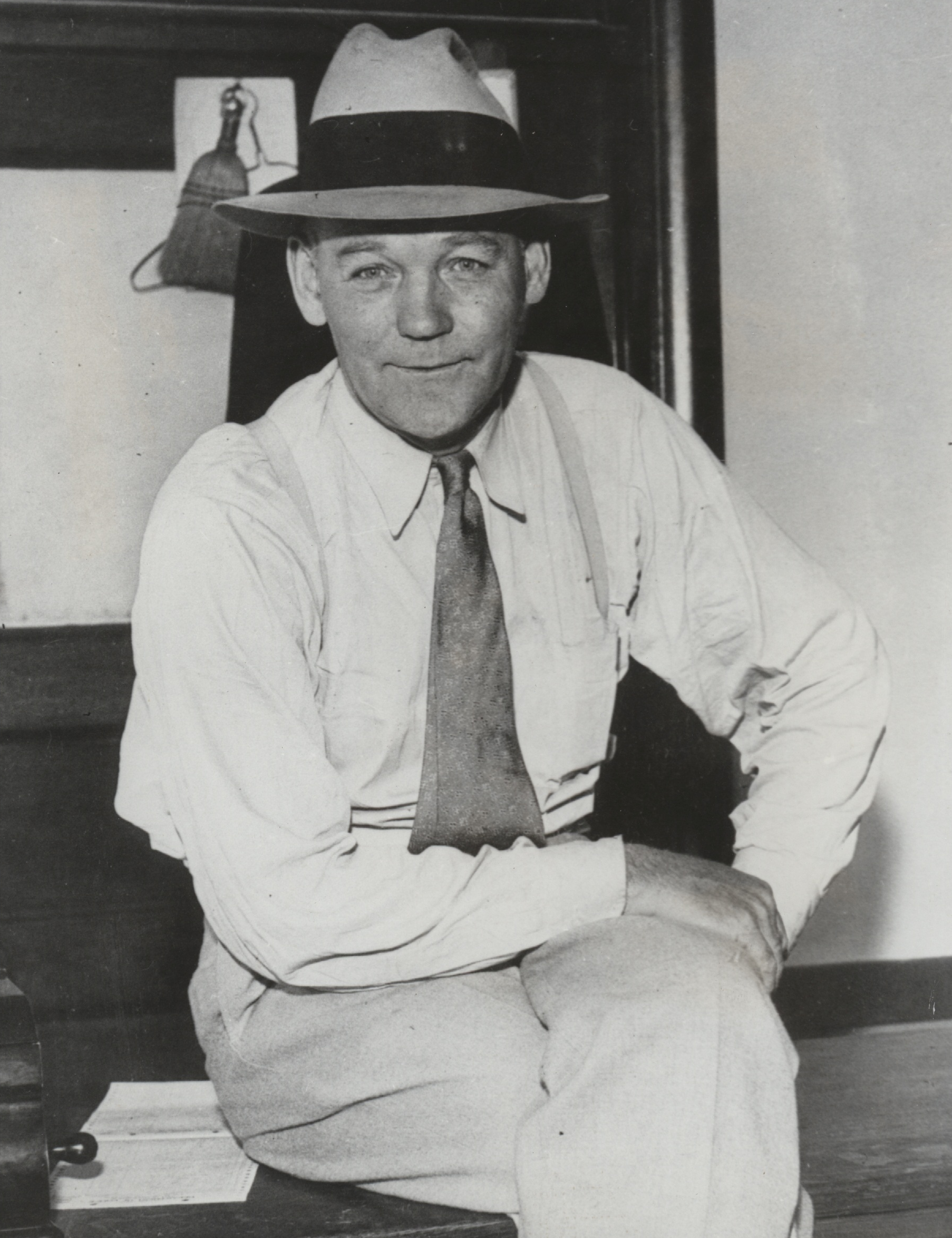
- Shoemaker in 1934

Member of the U.S. House of Representatives from Minnesota's at-large district
- In office March 4, 1933 – January 3, 1935
- Preceded by: District established
- Succeeded by: District abolished

Personal details
- Born: Francis Henry Shoemaker; April 25, 1889 Flora Township, Minnesota, U.S.
- Died: July 24, 1958 (aged 69) Minneapolis, Minnesota, U.S.
- Party: Farmer–Labor
- Other political affiliations: Nonpartisan League; Progressive
- Spouse: Lydgia Schneider (m. 1912; div. 1934)

Francis Henry Shoemaker (April 25, 1889 – July 24, 1958) was a U.S. representative from Minnesota.

== Early life ==
Shoemaker was born on a farm in Flora Township, Renville County, Minnesota, and was self-educated with his mother’s assistance. He engaged in agricultural pursuits and worked for many farm and labor organizations. He was a charter member and organizer of the Minnesota Farmer-Labor Party.

In 1920, while Shoemaker was an organizer for the Nonpartisan League, he was criticized by Harry Milford, the pastor of his church. Shoemaker had claimed that he was drafted despite not being physically fit to enter the army and having a dependent wife, being the only married man in the area to be so. Shoemaker said that he would not appeal the decision, but would gain retribution after returning. Milford stated that other married men were drafted, Shoemaker was deemed physically fit, and had filed an appeal to the draft board.

== Career ==
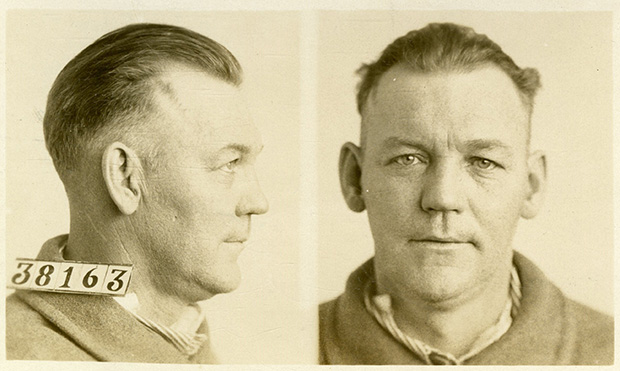
Shoemaker's Leavenworth Penitentiary mugshot, 1931

In 1924 he assisted in organizing the Federated Farmer-Labor Party at Chicago in 1924. Shoemaker was nominated for Vice President of the United States, but declined to run. He served as editor and publisher of the People’s Voice, Green Bay Farmer, and Progressive Farmer newspapers in Green Bay, Wisconsin, from 1921 to 1927, and of the Organized Farmer newspaper in Red Wing, Minnesota in 1928. In 1931 he served nine months at Leavenworth Penitentiary after being convicted for a federal charge of sending defamatory material through the mail and for violation of his probation.

Shoemaker was elected as a Farmer-Laborite to the 73rd congress. A House vote was held to determine whether or not to seat him and he was permitted retain his seat with 230 votes in his favor against 75 votes. During his tenure Shoemaker filed an impeachment resolution against United States District Judge Joseph W. Molyneaux which amounted to little. He was not a candidate for renomination in 1934 to the 74th congress, but was an unsuccessful candidate for nomination for Minnesota's Senate seat, but lost in the primary to incumbent Henrik Shipstead.

While a sitting member of Congress, he was arrested outside of his House office by two detectives, serving a warrant for assaulting a taxi driver.

== Later life ==
After twenty two years of marriage Shoemaker's wife, Lydgia Schneider, filed for divorce in 1934, due to him openly committing adultery and threatening her. In 1940 Shoemaker was sent to jail for 90 days after assaulting a neighbor and being accused of throwing hot water into his former wife's face. Later he filed to run in the Farmer-Labor primary for Minnesota's seventh congressional district, but came in last place with 11% of the vote.

He then became an unsuccessful Independent candidate for reelection to the 74th congress. After an unsuccessful election campaign in 1942 to the 78th congress, he resumed agricultural pursuits near North Redwood, Minnesota. He died at University of Minnesota Hospitals in Minneapolis on July 24, 1958, and was buried in Zion Cemetery in Flora Township, Renville County, Minnesota.

== Electoral history ==
Francis Shoemaker electoral history

1920 Wisconsin 8th Congressional District Republican primary
Party	Candidate	Votes	%	±%
Republican	Edward E. Browne (incumbent)	16,129	51.05%	
Republican	Michael G. Eberlein	10,836	34.30%	
Republican	Francis Shoemaker	4,620	14.62%	
Republican	Write-ins	11	0.04%	
Total votes		'31,596'	'100.00%'	

1930 Minnesota 3rd Congressional District election
Party	Candidate	Votes	%	±%
Republican	August H. Andresen (incumbent)	35,704	48.05%	−10.79%
Farmer–Labor	Francis Shoemaker	21,118	28.42%	+10.78%
Democratic	Joseph J. Moriarity	17,485	23.53%	+1.30%
Total votes		'74,307'	'100.00%'	

1932 Minnesota at-large Congressional District Farmer-Labor primary
Party	Candidate	Votes	%	±%
Farmer–Labor	Magnus Johnson	93,832	8.37%	
Farmer–Labor	Ernest Lundeen	77,412	6.90%	
Farmer–Labor	Paul John Kvale (incumbent)	72,366	6.45%	
Farmer–Labor	Henry M. Arens	69,777	6.22%	
Farmer–Labor	Arthur C. Townley	50,583	4.51%	
Farmer–Labor	C. F. Gaarenstroom	45,252	4.04%	
Farmer–Labor	J. L. Peterson	39,475	3.52%	
Farmer–Labor	Francis Shoemaker	37,658	3.36%	
Farmer–Labor	Henry Teigan	37,451	3.34%	
Farmer–Labor	Victor E. Lawson	34,437	3.07%	
Farmer–Labor	Erling Swenson	33,764	3.01%	
Farmer–Labor	Ralph O. Van Lear	32,935	2.94%	
Farmer–Labor	James Bede	32,613	2.91%	
Farmer–Labor	Lynn Thompson	30,672	2.74%	
Farmer–Labor	John Knutsen	29,436	2.63%	
Farmer–Labor	Howard Y. Williams	29,130	2.60%	
Farmer–Labor	Susie W. Stageberg	27,989	2.50%	
Farmer–Labor	Andrew Olaf Devold	27,949	2.49%	
Farmer–Labor	Julius J. Reiter	26,984	2.41%	
Farmer–Labor	Mathias Wagner	26,175	2.33%	
Farmer–Labor	Albert G. Bastis	24,397	2.18%	
Farmer–Labor	Rich T. Buckler	23,506	2.10%	
Farmer–Labor	A. H. Hendrickson	22,738	2.03%	
Farmer–Labor	John S. Crosby	22,320	1.99%	
Farmer–Labor	Laura E. Naplin	22,240	1.98%	
Farmer–Labor	Emil L. Regnier	22,115	1.97%	
Farmer–Labor	Russell C. Riley	19,002	1.69%	
Farmer–Labor	John G. Alexander	18,353	1.64%	
Farmer–Labor	J. V. Free	13,594	1.21%	
Farmer–Labor	C. J. Oiseth	11,461	1.02%	
Farmer–Labor	Albert C. Bosel	11,145	0.99%	
Farmer–Labor	Edward Trombley	10,651	0.95%	
Farmer–Labor	J. S. Konkel	10,237	0.91%	
Farmer–Labor	Curtis H. Windsor	9,837	0.88%	
Total votes		'1,121,505'	'100.00%'	

1934 Minnesota Senate Farmer-Labor primary
Party	Candidate	Votes	%	±%
Farmer–Labor	Henrik Shipstead (incumbent)	198,151	73.57%	
Farmer–Labor	Francis Shoemaker	71,172	26.43%	
Total votes		'269,323'	'100.00%'	

1934 Minnesota 8th Congressional District election
Party	Candidate	Votes	%	±%
Republican	William Alvin Pittenger	39,513	35.7%	
Independent	Francis Shoemaker (incumbent)	25,386	23.0%	
Farmer–Labor	A. L. Winterquist	25,024	22.6%	
Democratic	Jerry A. Harri	18,707	16.9%	
Independent	Thomas Foley	1,969	1.8%	
Total votes		'110,599'	'100.00%'	

1936 Minnesota 8th Congressional District Farmer-Labor primary
Party	Candidate	Votes	%	±%
Farmer–Labor	John Bernard	17,772	53.08%	
Farmer–Labor	Francis Shoemaker	15,713	46.93%	
Total votes		'33,485'	'100.00%'	

1940 Minnesota 7th Congressional District Farmer-Labor primary
Party	Candidate	Votes	%	±%
Farmer–Labor	Harold L. Peterson	5,211	49.59%	
Farmer–Labor	Paul John Kvale	4,051	38.55%	
Farmer–Labor	Francis Shoemaker	1,246	11.86%	
Total votes		'10,508'	'100.00%'	

1942 Minnesota 7th Congressional District election
Party	Candidate	Votes	%	±%
Republican	Herman Carl Andersen (incumbent)	46,570	54.79%	+4.10%
Democratic	Theodor S. Slen	21,192	24.93%	+8.18%
Farmer–Labor	Francis Shoemaker	17,241	20.28%	−12.27%
Total votes		'85,003'	'100.00%'	

1946 Minnesota 7th Congressional District Republican primary
Party	Candidate	Votes	%	±%
Republican	Herman Carl Andersen (incumbent)	31,849	79.20%	
Republican	Francis Shoemaker	8,367	20.81%	
Total votes		'40,216'	'100.00%'	

== See also ==
- List of federal political scandals in the United States

== Sources ==
- United States Congress. "Francis Shoemaker (id: S000374)". Biographical Directory of the United States Congress.

U.S. House of Representatives
Preceded by General ticket Adopted	U.S. Representative from Minnesota; General Ticket Seat Nine; 1933 – 1935	Succeeded by General ticket Abolished
