= Western Guard =

The Western Guard
- Type: Weekly newspaper
- Format: Broadsheet
- Editor: Adam Conroy
- Headquarters: Main Street; Madison, Minnesota 56256 United States
- Circulation: 2,100 Weekly
- Website: https://www.thewesternguardnews.com/

The Western Guard is a newspaper serving Madison and Lac qui Parle County in western Minnesota. It is published once a week on Wednesdays and has 2,100 subscribers.
