= Samuel A. Rask =

American politician (1874–1959)

Samuel Albert Rask (April 15, 1874 – October 3, 1959) was an American businessman and politician.

Rask was born on a farm in Caledonia, Houston County, Minnesota. He served as a corporal, in the Minnesota Voluntary Infantry, 13th Regiment, Company F in the Minnesota National Guard during the Spanish-American War. Rask moved to Blooming Prairie, Minnesota in Steele County, Minnesota, in 1899, with his wife and family. He was involved in the banking business and was the president of the 1st National Bank of Blooming Prairie. Rask served in the Minnesota Senate from 1917 to 1922. He died in Hudson, Wisconsin and was buried in the Fort Snelling National Cemetery.
