= Hilding Alfred Swanson =

American politician (1885–1964)

Hilding Alfred Swanson (June 30, 1885 – March 29, 1964) was an American politician and lawyer.

Swanson was born in Sweden and he emigrated with his parents to the United States and eventually settled in Brainerd, Minnesota in 1890. He went to the Brainerd public schools. Swanson received his bachelor's degrees from Valparaiso University in 1908 and 1900 and his law degree from Yale Law School in 1912. Swanson was admitted to the Minnesota bar. He served in the United States Marine Corps during World War I. Swanson lived in Brainerd, Minnesota with his wife and family and he practices law in Brainerd, Minnesota. Swanson served in the Minnesota House of Representatives in 1917 and 1918 and in the Minnesota Senate from 1919 to 1922.
