= Charles A. Lund =

American politician (1878–1959)

Charles A. Lund (October 14, 1878 – January 22, 1959) was an American lawyer and politician.

== Biography ==
Lund was born in Hudson, St. Croix County, Wisconsin and he moved to Vining, Otter Tail County, Minnesota with his parents at a young age. He went to the Vining Public Schools and graduated from Concordia College in 1896. He received his law degree from St. Paul College of Law (now William Mitchell College of Law), in 1904, and was admitted to the Minnesota bar. Lund involved with banking, law, and farming. He served as Mayor of Vining, Minnesota and on the Vining School Board. Lund served in the Minnesota Senate from 1923 to 1930. He died in Vining, Minnesota. The funeral and burial was in Vining, Minnesota.
