= N. J. Holmberg =

American politician

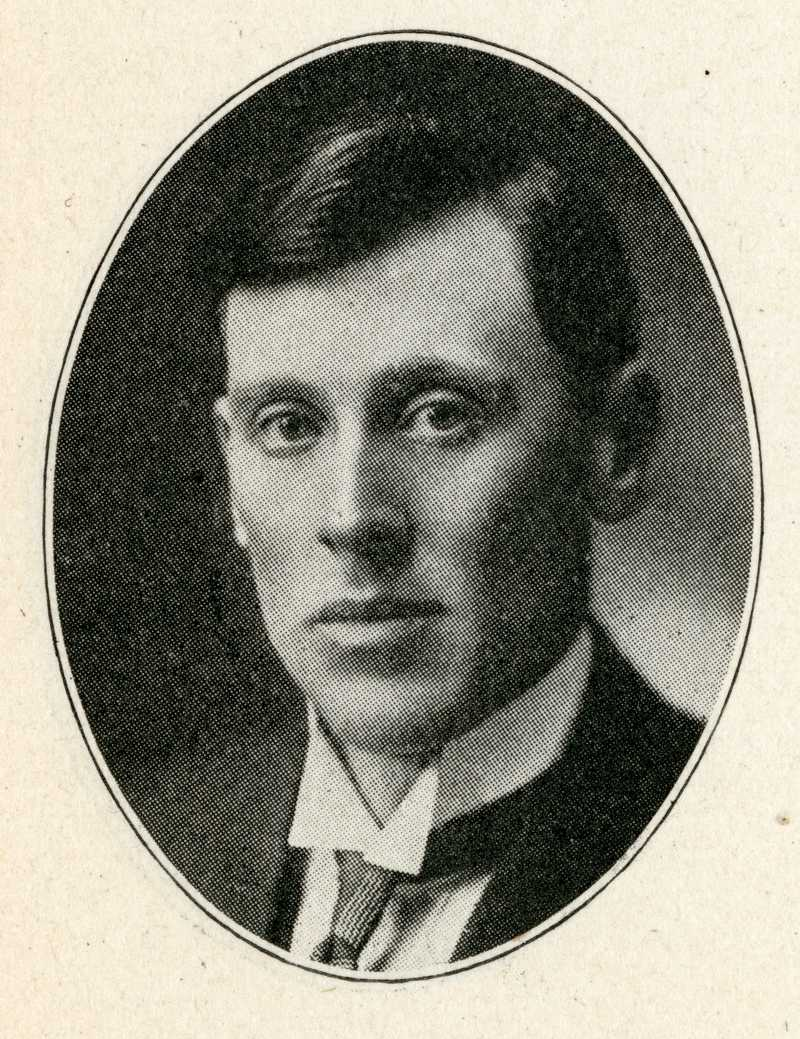
N. J. Holmberg

Nathaniel John Holmberg (July 24, 1878 – June 13, 1951) was an American politician and farmer.

Holmberg was born in a log cabin in Sacred Heart Township near Renville, Renville County, Minnesota and was educated in the Renville elementary public schools and the Renville High School. In 1909, Holmberg graduated from the University of Minnesota School of Agriculture. He lived in Renville, Minnesota with his wife and family and was a farmer. Holmberg served as the Sacred Heart Township supervisor and on the Reville School Board. He served in the Minnesota House of Representatives from 1907 to 1914 and in the Minnesota Senate from 1915 to 1918. Homberg was a Republican. He served on the Minnesota Railroad and Warehouse Commission and as the commissioner of the Minnesota Department of Agriculture. Holmberg died at the Saint Paul City Hall, in Saint Paul, Minnesota, from a heart attack while speaking at a committee meeting.

Party political offices
| Preceded by Arthur E. Nelson | Republican nominee for U.S. Senator from Minnesota (Class 1); 1934 | Succeeded by Henrik Shipstead |
