= Einar Hoidale =

American politician

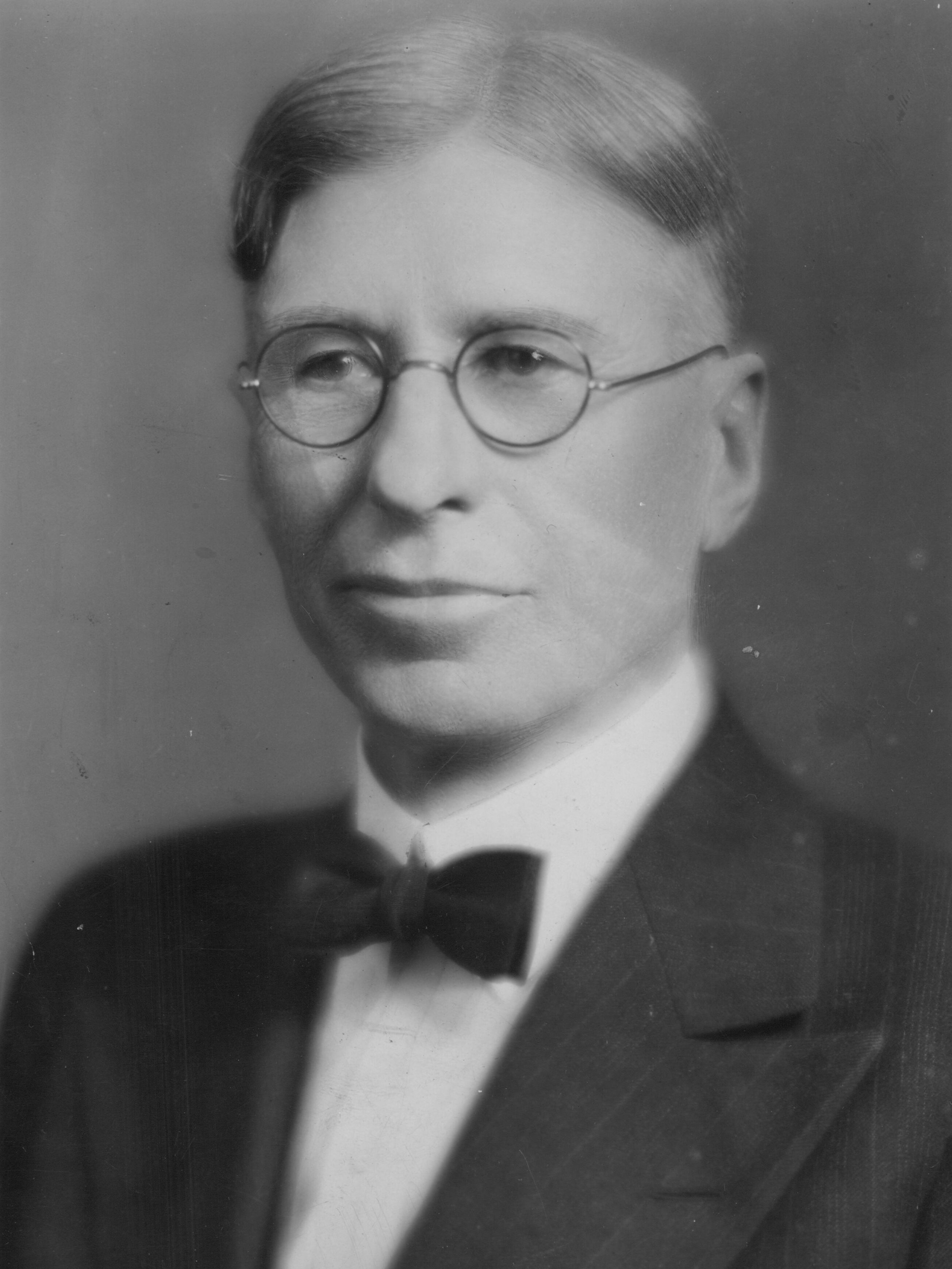
- Hoidale in 1929

Member of the U.S. House of Representatives from Minnesota's at-large district
- In office March 4, 1933 – January 3, 1935
- Preceded by: District established
- Succeeded by: District abolished

Personal details
- Born: Einar Hoidale; August 17, 1870 Tromsø, Troms, Norway
- Died: December 5, 1952 (aged 82) St. Petersburg, Florida, U.S.
- Party: Democratic

Einar Hoidale (August 17, 1870 – December 5, 1952) was an American lawyer, newspaper editor and elected official. He served as a member of the United States House of Representatives during the 1930s.

== Biography ==
Einar Hoidale was born at Tromsø in Troms, Norway. He was the son of Andrew Hoidale and Dorthea (Lund) Hoidale. He immigrated to the United States with his family at the age of seven. From 1890, he served as editor of the Western Guard newspaper in Madison, Minnesota. He graduated from the University of Minnesota Law School in 1898. He was admitted to the State of Minnesota bar the same year. He commenced practice in New Ulm, Minnesota with Henry Northrup Somsen (1875–1955). He subsequently served as prosecuting attorney for Brown County, Minnesota from 1900 to 1906. From 1900 to 1908, he also served a judge advocate for the Minnesota State Militia.

He was the Democratic Party candidate for the United States Senate from Minnesota in 1930. He was elected at-large to the United States House of Representatives and served in the 73rd Congress from 1933 to 1935. He lost a subsequent election after being nominated again for the U.S. Senate. In both of his Senate campaigns, Hoidale was involved in competitive 3-way races with Republican Party and Farmer Labor Party candidates, and came in second place both times. In 1930, he was barely defeated by Republican incumbent Thomas Schall, ahead of former Congressman and future senator Ernest Lundeen of the Farmer Labor Party. In 1934, he lost to Farmer Labor incumbent Henrik Shipstead.

He died in St. Petersburg, Florida and was buried at Lakewood Cemetery in Minneapolis, Minnesota.

== Other sources ==
- United States Congress. "Einar Hoidale (id: H000706)". Biographical Directory of the United States Congress.

Party political offices
Preceded by John J. Farrell	Democratic nominee for U.S. Senator from Minnesota (Class 2); 1930	Vacant Title next held by Patrick J. Delaney
Vacant Title last held by Anna Dickie Olesen	Democratic nominee for U.S. Senator from Minnesota (Class 1); 1934	Succeeded by John E. Regan
U.S. House of Representatives
Preceded by General Ticket Established	U.S. Representative from Minnesota; General Ticket Seat Four; 1933 – 1935	Succeeded by General Ticket Abolished
