= Paul J. Kvale =

American politician

Paul John Kvale
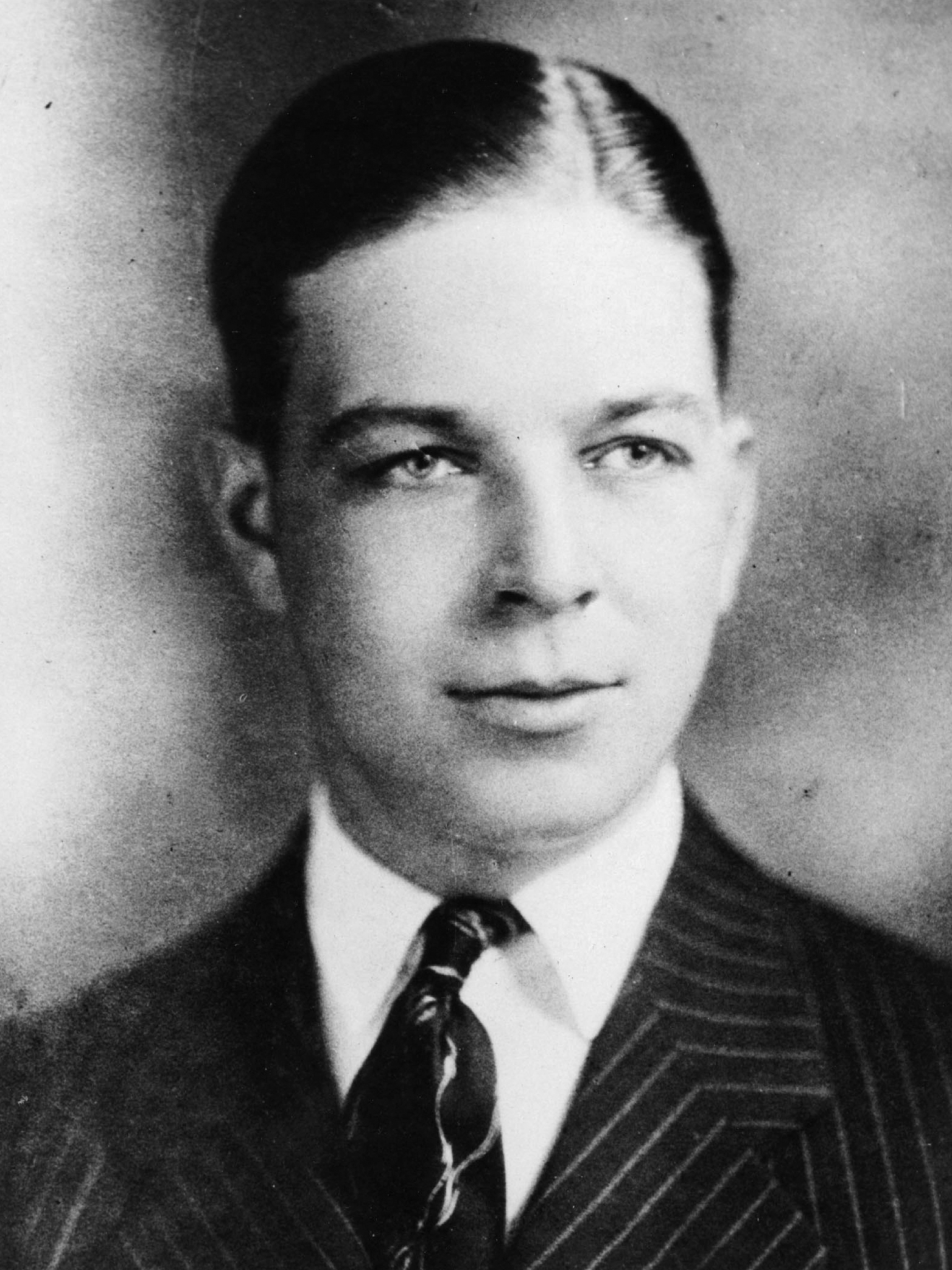
- Kvale in 1929

Member of the U.S. House of Representatives from Minnesota
- In office October 16, 1929 – January 3, 1939
- Preceded by: Ole J. Kvale
- Succeeded by: Herman C. Andersen
- Constituency: 7th district (1929–1933); At-large district (1933–1935); 7th district (1935–1939)

Personal details
- Born: March 27, 1896 Orfordville, Wisconsin, US
- Died: June 14, 1960 (aged 64) Minneapolis, Minnesota, US
- Resting place: Protestant Cemetery, Benson, Minnesota
- Party: Farmer-Labor
- Parent: Ole J. Kvale
- Education: University of Minnesota; Luther College

Military service
- Allegiance: United States
- Branch/service: United States Army
- Years of service: 1917-1919
- Rank: Sergeant
- Battles/wars: World War I

Paul John Kvale (/kwɒli/; March 27, 1896 – June 14, 1960) was a U.S. representative from Minnesota.

== Early life ==
Kvale who was born in Orfordville, Wisconsin as the son of Ole J. Kvale. He attended the Orfordville school and the University of Illinois. In 1917, he moved to Benson, Minnesota with his parents. Kvale graduated from Luther College in Decorah, Iowa, in 1917 and served in the United States Army during the First World War as a sergeant in a machine gun corps, from September 7, 1917, to August 4, 1919.

After the war, he became a student at the University of Minnesota at Minneapolis in 1919 and 1920, after which he returned to and engaged as editor of the Swift County News in 1920 and 1921. In 1921, he became staff editor of the Minneapolis Tribune.

== Political career ==
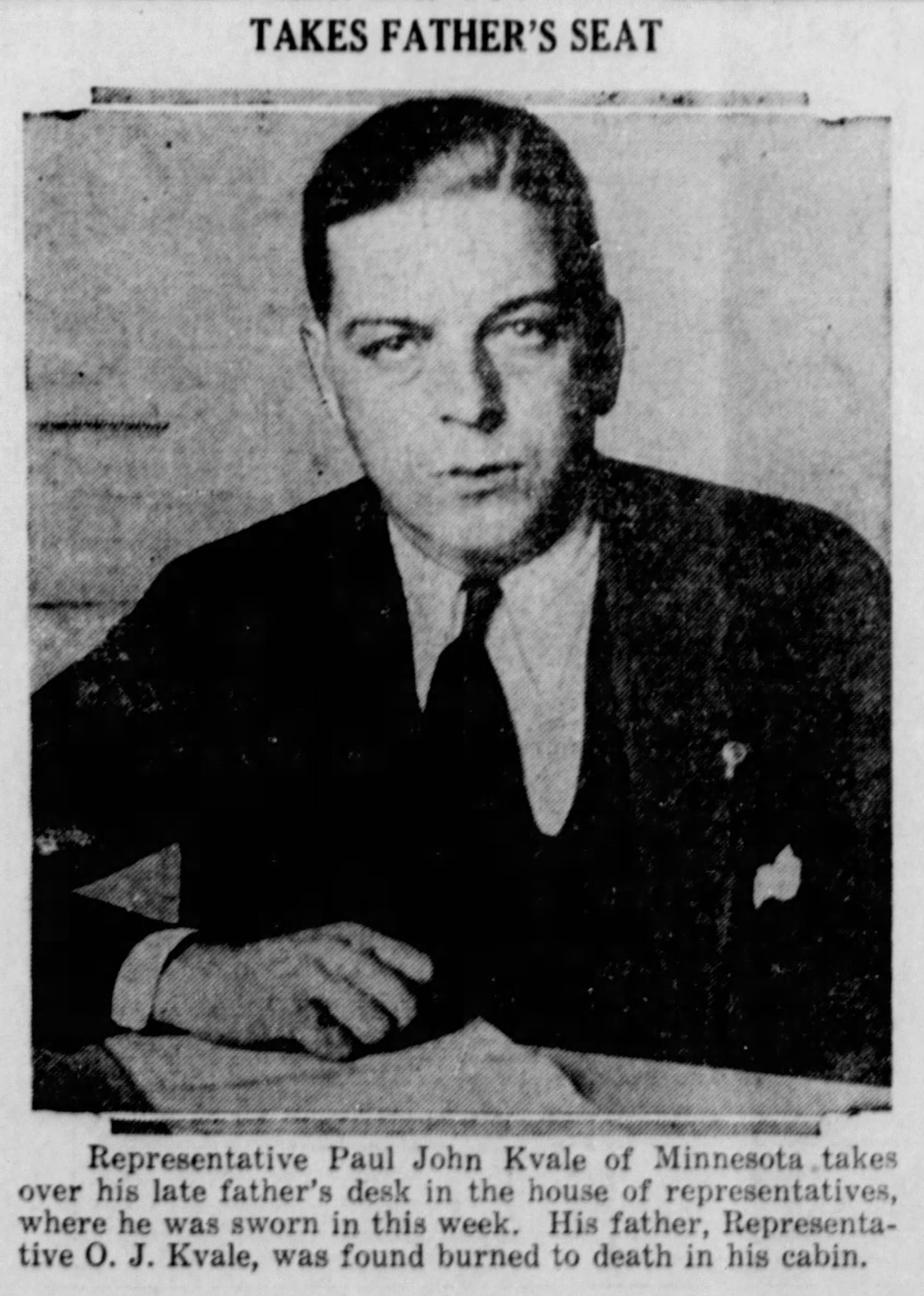
Kvale on the front page of the Brainerd Daily Dispatch after being sworn in, 1929

From 1922 to 1929, Kvale served as secretary to his father, who was a member of the United States Congress. After his father's death, he was elected as a Farmer-Labor candidate to the 71st congress to fill the vacancy. Kvale was re-elected to the 72nd, 73rd, 74th, and 75th congresses, and served from October 16, 1929, to January 3, 1939. His run for reelection in 1938 to the 76th congress was unsuccessful.

On June 14, 1960, Kvale died in Minneapolis, Minnesota. He was interred at the Protestant Cemetery in Swift County, Minnesota. Asked how to say his name, Kvale told The Literary Digest: "Pronounced qually, rhymes with golly."

U.S. House of Representatives
Preceded by Ole J. Kvale	U.S. Representative from Minnesota's 7th congressional district 1929 – 1933	Succeeded by General ticket adopted
Preceded by General ticket adopted	U.S. Representative from Minnesota's at-large congressional district (General ticket, seat seven); 1933 – 1935	Succeeded by General ticket abolished
Preceded by General ticket abolished	U.S. Representative from Minnesota's 7th congressional district 1935 – 1939	Succeeded by Herman Carl Andersen
