= Henry M. Arens =

American politician (1873–1963)

Henry Martin Arens
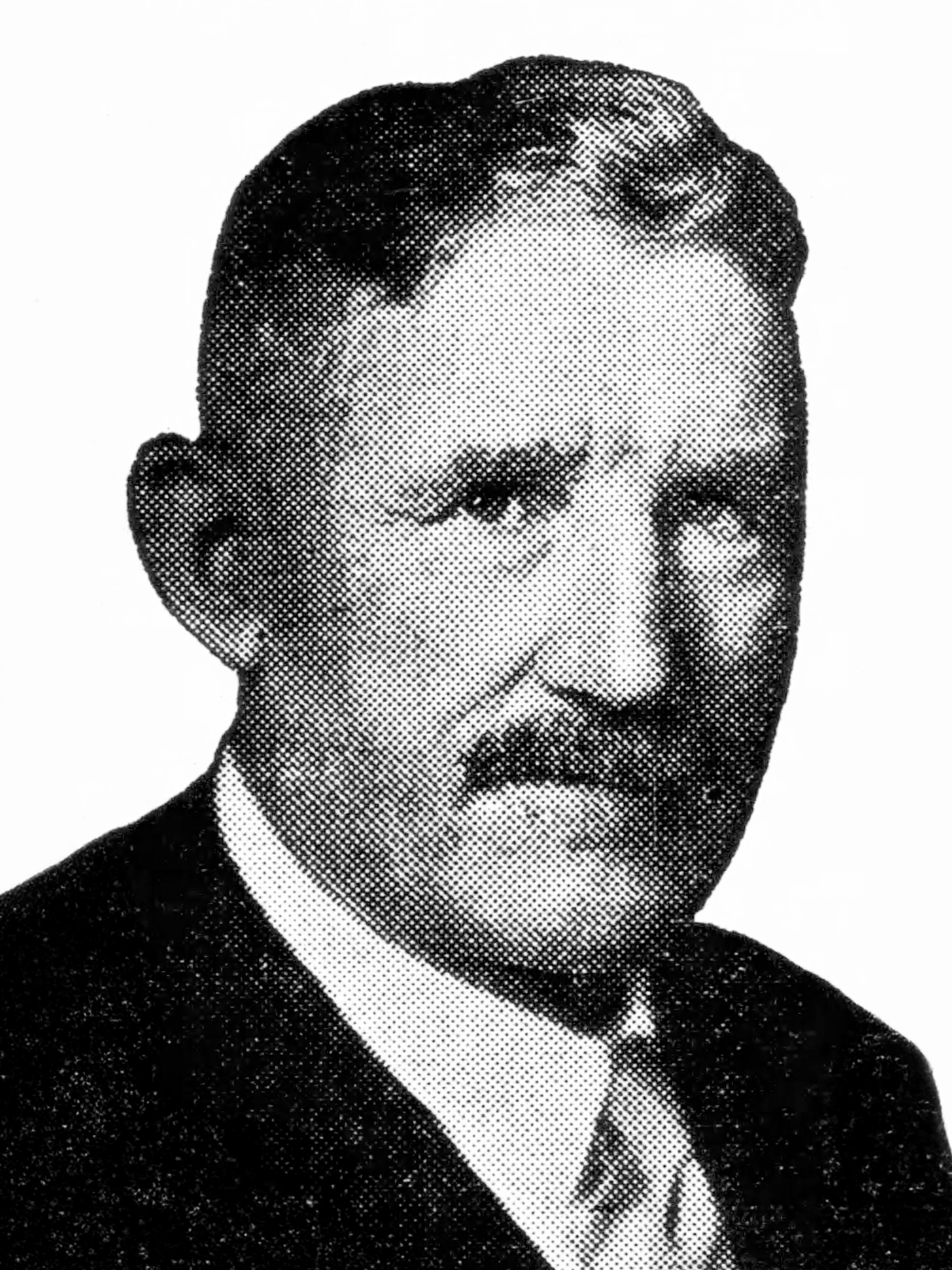
- Arens in 1934

26th Lieutenant Governor of Minnesota
- In office January 6, 1931 – January 3, 1933
- Governor: Floyd B. Olson
- Preceded by: Charles Edward Adams
- Succeeded by: Konrad K. Solberg

Member of the U.S. House of Representatives from Minnesota's at-large district
- In office March 4, 1933 – January 3, 1935
- Preceded by: General ticket adopted
- Succeeded by: General ticket abolished

Member of the Minnesota Senate from the 21st district
- In office January 1, 1923 – January 4, 1931
- Preceded by: William John Kuntz
- Succeeded by: Patrick W. Morrison

Member of the Minnesota House of Representatives from the 21st district
- In office January 6, 1919 – December 31, 1922
- Preceded by: Andy Donovan
- Succeeded by: William Geister

Personal details
- Born: November 21, 1873 Bausenrode, Westphalia, Kingdom of Prussia
- Died: October 6, 1963 (aged 89) Jordan, Minnesota, U.S.
- Party: Farmer Labor
- Profession: Farmer

Henry Martin Arens (November 21, 1873 – October 6, 1963) was a German-American farmer and politician from Minnesota who served in several public offices, including as lieutenant governor and U.S. representative.

== Early life ==
Arens was born as Heinrich Martin Arens in Bausenrode near Fretter in the Kingdom of Prussia, today part of the municipality of Finnentrop, Westphalia, Germany. He migrated to the United States in November 1889 and was a farmer near Jordan, Minnesota.

== Political career ==
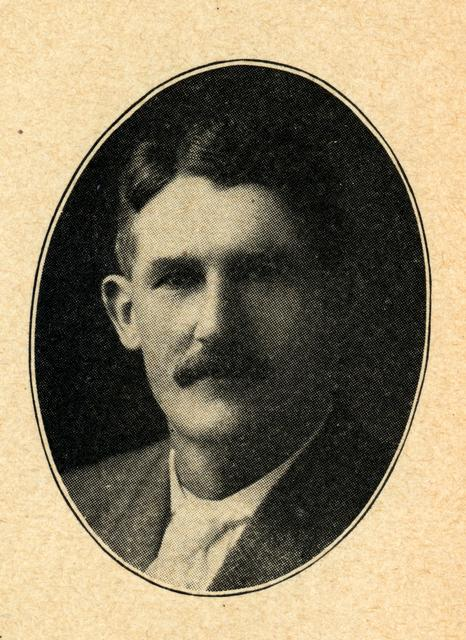
Arens's official State House portrait, 1919

His first public office was as a member of the board of aldermen for Jordan from 1905 to 1913. He was a member of the Minnesota House of Representatives from 1919 to 1922 and in the state senate from 1923 to 1930.

In 1930, he was elected the 26th Lieutenant Governor of Minnesota and served one two-year term. In 1932 he was elected to the 73rd congress as a member of the Minnesota Farmer-Labor Party. (In 1932, all of Minnesota's representatives were elected at large.) He served only one term, from March 4, 1933, to January 3, 1935, the start of the 20th Amendment. He was defeated for re-election in 1934 by Elmer Ryan, after which he commented that he was convinced "that politics is not worthwhile and that never again will I ask favors of the electorate." In 1936 he attempted to retake his seat and was again defeated by Ryan.

Party political offices
Preceded by Thomas J. Meighen	Farmer–Labor nominee for Lieutenant Governor of Minnesota; 1930	Succeeded by Konrad K. Solberg
Political offices
Preceded by Charles Edward Adams	Lieutenant Governor of Minnesota; 1931 – 1933	Succeeded by Konrad K. Solberg
U.S. House of Representatives
Preceded by General Ticket Established	U.S. Representative from Minnesota; General Ticket Seat One; March 4, 1933 – January 3, 1935	Succeeded by General Ticket Abolished
