= Harold Knutson =

American politician and journalist

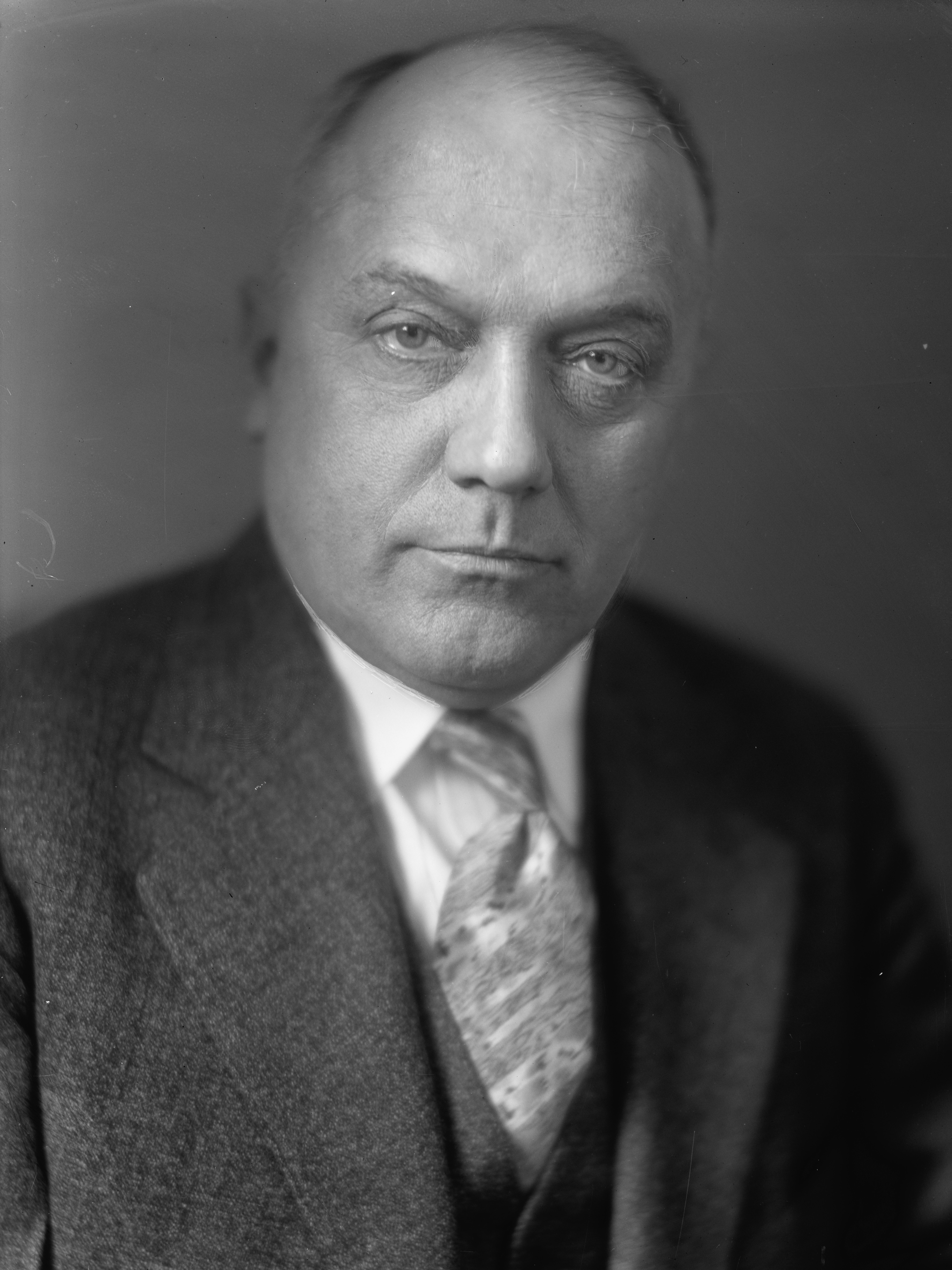

House Majority Whip
- In office March 3, 1919 – March 3, 1923
- Speaker: Frederick H. Gillett
- Preceded by: Thomas Montgomery Bell
- Succeeded by: Albert Henry Vestal

Member of the U.S. House of Representatives from Minnesota
- In office March 4, 1917 – January 3, 1949
- Preceded by: Charles August Lindbergh
- Succeeded by: Fred Marshall
- Constituency: 6th district (1917–1933); At-large district (1933–1935); 6th district (1935–1949)

Personal details
- Born: Harold Knutson; October 20, 1880 Skien, United Kingdoms of Sweden and Norway
- Died: August 21, 1953 (aged 72) Wadena, Minnesota, U.S.
- Party: Republican

Harold Knutson (October 20, 1880 – August 21, 1953) was an American politician and journalist who represented Minnesota in the United States House of Representatives from 1917 to 1949 as a member of the Republican Party. From 1919 to 1923 he was the Republican majority whip.

== Early life ==
Knutson was born in Skien, in Telemark county, United Kingdoms of Sweden and Norway. At the age of 6 he and his family moved to the United States. They initially settled in Chicago, Illinois, but later moved to Sherburne County, Minnesota.

== Journalist career ==
Knutson became the editor for the St. Cloud Daily Journal-Press. Later, he was president of the Northern Minnesota Editorial Association.

== U.S. House of Representatives ==
From 1917 to 1949 he served as a Republican Party Congressman in the 65th, 66th, 67th, 68th, 69th, 70th, 71st, 72nd, 73rd, 74th, 75th, 76th, 77th, 78th, 79th, and 80th congresses. On April 5, 1917, he voted against declaring war on Germany. He served as the majority whip from 1919 to 1923. From 1947 to 1949 he headed the House Ways and Means Committee. Knutson was a leading isolationist. He was known for being overtly sympathetic to Nazi Germany, and even after the attack on Pearl Harbor, gave an address that was condemned as "defeatist." Nazi Germany described him as "an asset" for the Nazi cause in their own documents.

== Later life ==
Knutson was defeated for re-election in 1948 and returned to editing, which he continued to do until his death in Wadena, Minnesota in 1953.

== Personal life ==
Knutson was a Lutheran. Camp Knutson (Cross Lake, Minnesota) is an accepting and nurturing camp environment for children with special needs. The camp was donated in 1953 by Minnesota Congressman Harold Knutson to be used as a summer retreat for "neglected, unfortunate, deprived and handicapped children." For over 50 years, thousands of children have taken part in the summer programs offered at Camp Knutson. Over the years, others who have been touched by Harold Knutson's vision continue to support, sustain and improve Camp Knutson for the future.

Knutson was a member of the Freemasons, the Benevolent and Protective Order of Elks, and the Independent Order of Odd Fellows.

== Legacy ==
Knutson Dam on the Mississippi River at Cass Lake is named after him.

== Additional Resources ==
- The Papers of Harold Knutson are available for research use at the Minnesota Historical Society.

U.S. House of Representatives
Preceded by Charles Lindbergh	Member of the U.S. House of Representatives from Minnesota's 6th congressional district 1917–1933	Succeeded by N/A
Preceded by N/A	Member of the U.S. House of Representatives from Minnesota's at-large congressional district 1933–1935	Succeeded by N/A
Preceded by N/A	Member of the U.S. House of Representatives from Minnesota's 6th congressional district 1935–1949	Succeeded by Fred Marshall
Party political offices
Preceded by Thomas Montgomery Bell (D-GA) (No majority (Democratic) whip 1915–1919; Bell was whip 1913–1915)	House Majority Whip; 1919–1923	Succeeded by Albert Henry Vestal (R-IN)
Preceded by Charles Mann Hamilton (NY)	House Republican Whip; 1919–1923	Succeeded by Albert Henry Vestal (IN)

- United States Congress. "Harold Knutson (id: K000301)". Biographical Directory of the United States Congress.
