= List of United States representatives from Minnesota =

The following is an alphabetical list of United States representatives from the state of Minnesota. For chronological tables of members of both houses of the United States Congress from the state (through the present day), see Minnesota's congressional delegations.

== Current members ==
Updated January 3, 2025.

- 1st district: Brad Finstad (R) (since 2022)
- 2nd district: Angie Craig (D) (since 2019)
- 3rd district: Kelly Morrison (D) (since 2025)
- 4th district: Betty McCollum (D) (since 2001)
- 5th district: Ilhan Omar (D) (since 2019)
- 6th district: Tom Emmer (R) (since 2015)
- 7th district: Michelle Fischbach (R) (since 2021)
- 8th district: Pete Stauber (R) (since 2019)

== List of representatives ==
| Representative | Party | District | Years | District home | Electoral history |
|---|---|---|---|---|---|
| Cyrus Aldrich | Republican | At-large | March 4, 1859 – March 3, 1863 | Minneapolis | Elected in 1859. Retired to run for U.S. senator. |
| John G. Alexander | Republican | 3rd | January 3, 1939 – January 3, 1941 | Redwood Falls | Elected in 1938. Lost renomination to Gale. |
| Herman Carl Andersen | Republican | 7th | January 3, 1939 – January 3, 1963 | Tyler | Elected in 1938. Redistricted to the 6th district and lost renomination to Robert J. Odegard. |
| Sydney Anderson | Republican | 1st | March 4, 1911 – March 3, 1925 | Lanesboro | Elected in 1910. Retired. |
| August H. Andresen | Republican | 3rd | March 4, 1925 – March 3, 1933 | Northfield | Elected in 1924. Redistricted to the at-large district and lost re-election to nine others. (Note: Arens, Chase, Christianson, Hoidale, Johnson, Knutson, P. Kvale, Lundeen, Shoemaker) |
| August H. Andresen | Republican | 1st | January 3, 1935 – January 14, 1958 | Northfield | Elected in 1934. Died. |
| Henry M. Arens | Farmer–Labor | At-large | March 4, 1933 – January 3, 1935 | Jordan | Elected in 1932. Redistricted to the 2nd district and lost re-election to Ryan. |
| John T. Averill | Republican | 2nd | March 4, 1871 – March 3, 1873 | Lake City | Elected in 1870. Redistricted to the 3rd district. |
| John T. Averill | Republican | 3rd | March 4, 1873 – March 3, 1875 | Lake City | Redistricted from the 2nd district and re-elected in 1872. Retired. |
| Michele Bachmann | Republican | 6th | January 3, 2007 – January 3, 2015 | Stillwater | Elected in 2006. Retired. |
| Melvin Baldwin | Democratic | 6th | March 4, 1893 – March 3, 1895 | Duluth | Elected in 1892. Lost re-election to Towne. |
| James Bede | Republican | 8th | March 4, 1903 – March 3, 1909 | Duluth | Elected in 1902. Lost renomination to Miller. |
| Robert Bergland | Democratic–Farmer–Labor | 7th | January 3, 1971 – January 22, 1977 | Roseau | Elected in 1970. Resigned to become U.S. Secretary of Agriculture |
| John Bernard | Farmer–Labor | 8th | January 3, 1937 – January 3, 1939 | Eveleth | Elected in 1936. Lost re-election to Pittenger. |
| John Blatnik | Democratic–Farmer–Labor | 8th | January 3, 1947 – December 31, 1974 | Chisholm | Elected in 1946. Retired and resigned early. |
| Haldor Boen | Populist | 7th | March 4, 1893 – March 3, 1895 | Fergus Falls | Elected in 1892. Lost re-election to Eddy. |
| Rich T. Buckler | Farmer–Labor | 9th | January 3, 1935 – January 3, 1943 | Andover | Re-elected in 1934. Retired. |
| Clarence Buckman | Republican | 6th | March 4, 1903 – March 3, 1907 | Little Falls | Elected in 1902. Lost renomination to Lindbergh. |
| William Leighton Carss | Farmer–Labor | 8th | March 4, 1919 – March 3, 1921 | Proctor | Elected in 1918. Lost re-election to Larson as a Democrat. |
| William Leighton Carss | Farmer–Labor | 8th | March 4, 1925 – March 3, 1929 | Proctor | Elected in 1924. Lost re-election to Pittenger. |
| James Castle | Democratic | 4th | March 4, 1891 – March 3, 1893 | Stillwater | Elected in 1890. Lost re-election to Kiefer. |
| James M. Cavanaugh | Democratic | 1st | May 11, 1858 – March 3, 1859 | Chatfield | Elected in 1857. Lost re-election to Windom. |
| Ray P. Chase | Republican | At-large | March 4, 1933 – January 3, 1935 | Anoka | Elected in 1932. Redistricted to the 5th district and lost renomination to Christianson. |
| Victor Christgau | Republican | 1st | March 4, 1929 – March 3, 1933 | Dexter | Elected in 1928. Redistricted to the at-large district, lost renomination and lost re-election as an independent. |
| Theodore Christianson | Republican | At-large | March 4, 1933 – January 3, 1935 | Lac qui Parle | Elected in 1932. Redistricted to the 5th district. |
| Theodore Christianson | Republican | 5th | January 3, 1935 – January 3, 1937 | Lac qui Parle | Redistricted from the at-large district and re-elected in 1934. Retired to run for U.S. senator. |
| Frank Clague | Republican | 2nd | March 4, 1921 – March 3, 1933 | Lamberton | Elected in 1920. Retired. |
| Solomon Comstock | Republican | 5th | March 4, 1889 – March 3, 1891 | Moorhead | Elected in 1888. Lost re-election to Halvorson. |
| Angie Craig | Democratic–Farmer–Labor | 2nd | January 3, 2019 – present | Eagan | Elected in 2018. Incumbent. |
| Chip Cravaack | Republican | 8th | January 3, 2011 – January 3, 2013 | Lindstrom | Elected in 2010. Lost re-election to R. Nolan. |
| Charles Russell Davis | Republican | 3rd | March 4, 1903 – March 3, 1925 | St. Peter | Elected in 1902. Lost renomination to Andresen. |
| Edward Devitt | Republican | 4th | January 3, 1947 – January 3, 1949 | Saint Paul | Elected in 1946. Lost re-election to McCarthy. |
| Ignatius L. Donnelly | Republican | 2nd | March 4, 1863 – March 3, 1869 | St. Paul | Elected in 1862. Lost re-election to E. Wilson. |
| Mark H. Dunnell | Republican | 1st | March 4, 1871 – March 3, 1883 | Owatonna | Elected in 1870. Retired to run for U.S. senator. |
| Mark H. Dunnell | Republican | 1st | March 4, 1889 – March 3, 1891 | Owatonna | Elected in 1888. Lost re-election to Harries. |
| Frank Eddy | Republican | 7th | March 4, 1895 – March 3, 1903 | Glenwood | Elected in 1894. Retired. |
| Keith Ellison | Democratic–Farmer–Labor | 5th | January 3, 2007 – January 3, 2019 | Minneapolis | Elected in 2006. Retired to run for Attorney General of Minnesota. |
| Franklin Ellsworth | Republican | 2nd | March 4, 1915 – March 3, 1921 | St. James | Elected in 1914. Retired to run for governor. |
| Arlen Erdahl | Republican | 1st | January 3, 1979 – January 3, 1983 | Blue Earth | Elected in 1978. Lost renomination to T. Hagedorn. |
| Tom Emmer | Republican | 6th | January 3, 2015 – present | Delano | Elected in 2014. Incumbent. |
| Brad Finstad | Republican | 1st | August 9, 2022 – present | New Ulm | Elected to finish Hagedorn's term Incumbent. |
| Michelle Fischbach | Republican | 7th | January 3, 2021 – present | Regal | Elected in 2020; Incumbent. |
| Loren Fletcher | Republican | 5th | March 4, 1893 – March 3, 1903 | Minneapolis | Elected in 1892. Lost re-election to Lind. |
| Loren Fletcher | Republican | 5th | March 4, 1905 – March 3, 1907 | Minneapolis | Elected in 1904. Retired. |
| Donald M. Fraser | Democratic–Farmer–Labor | 5th | January 3, 1963 – January 3, 1979 | Minneapolis | Elected in 1962. Retired to run for U.S. senator. |
| Bill Frenzel | Republican | 3rd | January 3, 1971 – January 3, 1991 | Saint Paul | Elected in 1970. Retired. |
| Allen J. Furlow | Republican | 1st | March 4, 1925 – March 3, 1929 | Rochester | Elected in 1924. Lost renomination to Christgau. |
| Richard Pillsbury Gale | Republican | 3rd | January 3, 1941 – January 3, 1945 | Minneapolis | Elected in 1940. Lost re-election to Gallagher. |
| William Gallagher | Democratic–Farmer–Labor | 3rd | January 3, 1945 – August 13, 1946 | Rochester | Elected in 1944. Died. |
| John Gilfillan | Republican | 4th | March 4, 1885 – March 3, 1887 | Minneapolis | Elected in 1884. Lost re-election to E. Rice. |
| Godfrey G. Goodwin | Republican | 10th | March 4, 1925 – February 16, 1933 | Cambridge | Elected in 1924. Redistricted to the at-large district, lost renomination and died before next term began. |
| Rod Grams | Republican | 6th | January 3, 1993 – January 3, 1995 | Princeton | Elected in 1992. Retired to run for U.S. senator. |
| Gil Gutknecht | Republican | 1st | January 3, 1995 – January 3, 2007 | Rochester | Elected in 1994. Lost re-election to Walz. |
| Jim Hagedorn | Republican | 1st | January 3, 2019 – February 17, 2022 | Blue Earth | Elected in 2018. Died. |
| Tom Hagedorn | Republican | 2nd | January 3, 1975 – January 3, 1983 | Truman | Elected in 1974. Redistricted to the 1st district and lost re-election to Penny. |
| Harold Hagen | Farmer–Labor | 9th | January 3, 1943 – January 3, 1945 | Crookston | Elected in 1942. Switched parties. |
| Harold Hagen | Republican | 9th | January 3, 1945 – January 3, 1955 | Crookston | Re-elected in 1944 as a Republican. Lost re-election to C. Knutson. |
| Darwin Hall | Republican | 3rd | March 4, 1889 – March 3, 1891 | Benson | Elected in 1888. Lost re-election to O. Hall. |
| Osee M. Hall | Democratic | 3rd | March 4, 1891 – March 3, 1895 | Red Wing | Elected in 1890. Lost re-election to Heatwole. |
| Kittel Halvorson | Populist | 5th | March 4, 1891 – March 3, 1893 | Belgrade | Elected in 1890. Lost re-election to Fletcher. |
| Winfield Scott Hammond | Democratic | 2nd | March 4, 1907 – January 6, 1915 | St. James | Elected in 1906. Retired to run for governor and resigned when elected. |
| William H. Harries | Democratic | 1st | March 4, 1891 – March 3, 1893 | Caledonia | Elected in 1890. Lost re-election to Tawney. |
| Joel Heatwole | Republican | 3rd | March 4, 1895 – March 3, 1903 | Northfield | Elected in 1894. Retired. |
| Einar Hoidale | Democratic | At-large | March 4, 1933 – January 3, 1935 | New Ulm | Elected in 1932. Retired to run for U.S. senator. |
| Dewey Johnson | Farmer–Labor | 5th | January 3, 1937 – January 3, 1939 | Minneapolis | Elected in 1936. Lost re-election to Youngdahl. |
| Magnus Johnson | Farmer–Labor | At-large | March 4, 1933 – January 3, 1935 | Dassel | Elected in 1932. Redistricted to the 6th district and lost re-election to H. Knutson. |
| Walter Judd | Republican | 5th | January 3, 1943 – January 3, 1963 | Minneapolis | Elected in 1942. Lost re-election to Fraser. |
| Joseph Karth | Democratic–Farmer–Labor | 4th | January 3, 1959 – January 3, 1977 | Saint Paul | Elected in 1958. Retired. |
| Oscar Keller | Republican | 4th | July 1, 1919 – March 3, 1927 | Saint Paul | Elected to finish Van Dyke's term. Lost renomination to Maas. |
| Mark Kennedy | Republican | 2nd | January 3, 2001 – January 3, 2003 | Watertown | Elected in 2000. Redistricted to the 6th district. |
| Mark Kennedy | Republican | 6th | January 3, 2003 – January 3, 2007 | Watertown | Redistricted from the 2nd district and re-elected in 2002. Retired to run for U.S. senator. |
| Andrew Kiefer | Republican | 4th | March 4, 1893 – March 3, 1897 | Saint Paul | Elected in 1892. Retired. |
| William S. King | Republican | 3rd | March 4, 1875 – March 3, 1877 | Minneapolis | Elected in 1874. Retired. |
| William W. Kingsbury | Democratic | Territory | March 4, 1857 – May 11, 1858 | Duluth | Elected in 1856. Retired when district eliminated. |
| John Kline | Republican | 2nd | January 3, 2003 – January 3, 2017 | Lakeville | Elected in 2002. Retired. |
| Coya Knutson | Democratic–Farmer–Labor | 9th | January 3, 1955 – January 3, 1959 | Oklee | Elected in 1954. Lost re-election to Langen. |
| Harold Knutson | Republican | 6th | March 4, 1917 – March 3, 1933 | Wadena | Elected in 1916. Redistricted to the At-large district. |
| Harold Knutson | Republican | At-large | March 4, 1933 – January 3, 1935 | Wadena | Redistricted from the 6th district and re-elected in 1932. Redistricted to the 6th district. |
| Harold Knutson | Republican | 6th | January 3, 1935 – January 3, 1949 | Wadena | Redistricted from the at-large district and re-elected in 1934. Lost re-election to Marshall. |
| Ole J. Kvale | Farmer–Labor | 7th | March 4, 1923 – September 11, 1929 | Benson | Elected in 1922. Died. |
| Paul John Kvale | Farmer–Labor | 7th | October 16, 1929 – March 4, 1933 | Benson | Elected to finish his father's term. Redistricted to the at-large district. |
| Paul John Kvale | Farmer–Labor | At-large | March 4, 1933 – January 3, 1935 | Benson | Redistricted from the 7th district and re-elected in 1932. Redistricted to the 7th district. |
| Paul John Kvale | Farmer–Labor | 7th | January 3, 1935 – January 3, 1939 | Benson | Redistricted from the at-large district and re-elected in 1934. Lost re-election to Andersen. |
| Odin Langen | Republican | 9th | January 3, 1959 – January 3, 1963 | Kennedy | Elected in 1958. Redistricted to the 7th district. |
| Odin Langen | Republican | 7th | January 3, 1963 – January 3, 1971 | Kennedy | Redistricted from the 9th district and re-elected in 1962. Lost re-election to Bergland. |
| Oscar Larson | Republican | 8th | March 4, 1921 – March 3, 1925 | Duluth | Elected in 1920. Retired. |
| Jason Lewis | Republican | 2nd | January 3, 2017 – January 3, 2019 | Burnsville | Elected in 2016. Lost re-election to Craig. |
| John Lind | Republican | 2nd | March 4, 1887 – March 3, 1893 | New Ulm | Elected in 1886. Retired. |
| John Lind | Democratic | 5th | March 4, 1903 – March 3, 1905 | New Ulm | Elected in 1902. Retired. |
| Charles August Lindbergh | Republican | 6th | March 4, 1907 – March 3, 1917 | Morrison County | Elected in 1906. Retired to run for U.S. senator. |
| Ernest Lundeen | Republican | 5th | March 4, 1917 – March 3, 1919 | Northfield | Elected in 1916. Lost renomination to Newton. |
| Ernest Lundeen | Republican | At-large | March 4, 1933 – January 3, 1935 | Northfield | Elected in 1932. Redistricted to the 3rd district. |
| Ernest Lundeen | Republican | 3rd | January 3, 1935 – January 3, 1937 | Northfield | Redistricted from the at-large district and re-elected in 1934. Retired to run for U.S. senator. |
| Bill Luther | Democratic–Farmer–Labor | 6th | January 3, 1995 – January 3, 2003 | Fergus Falls | Elected in 1994. Lost re-election to Kennedy. |
| Melvin Maas | Republican | 4th | March 4, 1927 – March 3, 1933 | Saint Paul | Elected in 1926. Redistricted to the at-large district and lost renomination. |
| Melvin Maas | Republican | 4th | January 3, 1935 – January 3, 1945 | Saint Paul | Elected in 1934. Lost re-election to Starkey. |
| John L. MacDonald | Democratic | 3rd | March 4, 1887 – March 3, 1889 | Shakopee | Elected in 1886. Lost re-election to D. Hall. |
| Clark MacGregor | Republican | 3rd | January 3, 1961 – January 3, 1971 | Minneapolis | Elected in 1960. Retired to run for U.S. senator. |
| George MacKinnon | Republican | 3rd | January 3, 1947 – January 3, 1949 | Minneapolis | Elected in 1946. Lost re-election to Wier. |
| James Manahan | Republican | At-large | March 4, 1913 – March 3, 1915 | Minneapolis | Elected in 1912. Retired. |
| Fred Marshall | Democratic–Farmer–Labor | 6th | January 3, 1949 – January 3, 1963 | Grove City | Elected in 1948. Retired. |
| Eugene McCarthy | Democratic–Farmer–Labor | 4th | January 3, 1949 – January 3, 1959 | St. Paul | Re-elected in 1946. Retired to run for U.S. senator. |
| James McCleary | Republican | 2nd | March 4, 1893 – March 3, 1907 | Mankato | Elected in 1892. Lost re-election to Hammond. |
| Betty McCollum | Democratic–Farmer–Labor | 4th | January 3, 2001 – present | St. Paul | Elected in 2000. Incumbent. |
| Clarence B. Miller | Republican | 8th | March 4, 1909 – March 3, 1919 | Duluth | Elected in 1908. Lost re-election to Carss. |
| David Minge | Democratic–Farmer–Labor | 2nd | January 3, 1993 – January 3, 2001 | Montevideo | Elected in 1992. Lost re-election to Kennedy. |
| Robert P. Morris | Republican | 6th | March 4, 1897 – March 3, 1903 | Duluth | Elected in 1896. Retired. |
| Kelly Morrison | Democratic–Farmer–Labor | 3rd | January 3, 2025 – present | Wayzata | Elected in 2024. Incumbent. |
| Ancher Nelsen | Republican | 2nd | January 3, 1959 – December 31, 1974 | Hutchinson | Elected in 1958. Retired and resigned early. |
| Knute Nelson | Republican | 5th | March 4, 1883 – March 3, 1889 | Alexandria | Elected in 1882. Retired. |
| Walter Newton | Republican | 5th | March 4, 1919 – June 30, 1929 | Minneapolis | Elected in 1918. Resigned to become Secretary to President Herbert Hoover. |
| Rick Nolan | Democratic–Farmer–Labor | 6th | January 3, 1975 – January 3, 1981 | Crosby | Elected in 1974. Retired. |
| Rick Nolan | Democratic–Farmer–Labor | 8th | January 3, 2013 - January 3, 2019 | Crosby | Elected in 2012. Retired to run for lt. governor. |
| William I. Nolan | Republican | 5th | June 17, 1929 – March 3, 1933 | Minneapolis | Elected to finish Newton's term. Redistricted to the at-large district and lost re-election to nine others. |
| Frank Nye | Republican | 5th | March 4, 1907 – March 3, 1913 | Minneapolis | Elected in 1906. Retired. |
| Jim Oberstar | Democratic–Farmer–Labor | 8th | January 3, 1975 – January 3, 2011 | Chisholm | Elected in 1974. Lost re-election to Cravaack. |
| Joseph P. O'Hara | Republican | 2nd | January 3, 1941 – January 3, 1959 | Glencoe | Elected in 1940. Retired. |
| Alec G. Olson | Democratic–Farmer–Labor | 6th | January 3, 1963 – January 3, 1967 | Willmar | Elected in 1962. Lost re-election to Zwach. |
| Ilhan Omar | Democratic–Farmer–Labor | 5th | January 3, 2019 – present | Minneapolis | Elected in 2018. Incumbent |
| Erik Paulsen | Republican | 3rd | January 3, 2009 – January 3, 2019 | Eden Prairie | Elected in 2008. Lost re-election to Phillips. |
| Tim Penny | Democratic–Farmer–Labor | 1st | January 3, 1983 – January 3, 1995 | Waseca | Elected in 1982. Retired. |
| Collin Peterson | Democratic–Farmer–Labor | 7th | January 3, 1991 – January 3, 2021 | Detroit Lakes | Elected in 1990. Lost re-election to Fischbach. |
| William Wallace Phelps | Democratic | 2nd | May 11, 1858 – March 3, 1859 | Red Wing | Elected in 1857. Retired. |
| Dean Phillips | Democratic–Farmer–Labor | 3rd | January 3, 2019 – January 3, 2025 | Deephaven | Elected in 2018. Retired to run for president. |
| William Alvin Pittenger | Republican | 8th | March 4, 1929 – March 3, 1933 | Duluth | Elected in 1928. Redistricted to the at-large district and lost re-election to nine others. |
| William Alvin Pittenger | Republican | 8th | January 3, 1935 – January 3, 1937 | Duluth | Elected in 1934. Lost re-election to Bernard. |
| William Alvin Pittenger | Republican | 8th | January 3, 1939 – January 3, 1947 | Duluth | Elected in 1938. Lost re-election to Blatnik. |
| Henry Poehler | Democratic | 2nd | March 4, 1877 – March 3, 1879 | Henderson | Elected in 1878. Lost re-election to Strait. |
| Al Quie | Republican | 1st | February 18, 1958 – January 3, 1979 | Dennison | Elected to finish Andresen's term. Retired to run for governor. |
| Jim Ramstad | Republican | 3rd | January 3, 1991 – January 3, 2009 | Wayzata | Elected in 1990. Retired. |
| Edmund Rice | Democratic | 4th | March 4, 1887 – March 3, 1889 | Saint Paul | Elected in 1886. Lost re-election to Snider. |
| Henry Mower Rice | Democratic | Territory | March 4, 1853 – March 3, 1857 | Minneapolis | Elected in 1852. Retired. |
| Elmer Ryan | Democratic | 2nd | January 3, 1935 – January 3, 1941 | South St. Paul | Elected in 1934. Lost re-election to O'Hara. |
| Martin Olav Sabo | Democratic–Farmer–Labor | 5th | January 3, 1979 – January 3, 2007 | Minneapolis | Elected in 1978. Retired. |
| Thomas D. Schall | Republican | 10th | March 4, 1915 – March 3, 1925 | Campbell | Elected in 1914. Retired to run for U.S. senator. |
| Conrad Selvig | Republican | 9th | March 4, 1927 – March 3, 1933 | Crookston | Elected in 1926. Redistricted to the at-large district and lost re-election to nine others. |
| Francis Shoemaker | Farmer–Labor | At-large | March 4, 1933 – January 3, 1935 | Red Wing | Elected in 1932. Redistricted to the 8th district and lost re-election as an independent. |
| Henry Hastings Sibley | Democratic | Territory | July 7, 1849 – March 3, 1853 | Mendota | Elected in 1849. Retired. |
| Gerry Sikorski | Democratic–Farmer–Labor | 6th | January 3, 1983 – January 3, 1993 | Stillwater | Elected in 1982. Lost re-election to Grams. |
| George Ross Smith | Republican | 5th | March 4, 1913 – March 3, 1917 | Minneapolis | Elected in 1912. Lost re-election to Lundeen. |
| Samuel Snider | Republican | 4th | March 4, 1889 – March 3, 1891 | Minneapolis | Elected in 1888. Lost re-election to Castle. |
| Arlan Stangeland | Republican | 7th | February 22, 1977 – January 3, 1991 | Barnesville | Elected to finish Bergland's term. Lost re-election to Peterson. |
| Frank Starkey | Democratic–Farmer–Labor | 4th | January 3, 1945 – January 3, 1947 | Saint Paul | Elected in 1944. Lost re-election to Devitt. |
| Pete Stauber | Republican | 8th | January 3, 2019 – present | Hermantown | Elected in 2018. Incumbent. |
| Halvor Steenerson | Republican | 9th | March 4, 1903 – March 3, 1923 | Crookston | Elected in 1902. Lost re-election to Wefald. |
| Frederick Stevens | Republican | 4th | March 4, 1897 – March 3, 1915 | Saint Paul | Elected in 1896. Lost re-election to Van Dyke. |
| Jacob H. Stewart | Republican | 3rd | March 4, 1877 – March 3, 1879 | Saint Paul | Elected in 1876. Retired. |
| Horace B. Strait | Republican | 2nd | March 4, 1873 – March 3, 1879 | Shakopee | Elected in 1872. Lost re-election to Poehler. |
| Horace B. Strait | Republican | 2nd | March 4, 1881 – March 3, 1883 | Shakopee | Elected in 1880. Redistricted to the 3rd district. |
| Horace B. Strait | Republican | 3rd | March 4, 1883 – March 3, 1887 | Shakopee | Redistricted from the 2nd district and re-elected in 1882. Lost re-election to MacDonald. |
| James Albertus Tawney | Republican | 1st | March 4, 1893 – March 3, 1911 | Winona | Elected in 1892. Lost renomination to Anderson. |
| Henry Teigan | Farmer–Labor | 3rd | January 3, 1937 – January 3, 1939 | Minneapolis | Elected in 1936. Lost re-election to Alexander. |
| Charles A. Towne | Republican | 6th | March 4, 1895 – March 3, 1897 | Duluth | Elected in 1894. Lost re-election to Morris as an independent. |
| Carl Van Dyke | Democratic | 4th | March 4, 1915 – May 20, 1919 | Saint Paul | Elected in 1914. Died. |
| Bruce Vento | Democratic–Farmer–Labor | 4th | January 3, 1977 – October 10, 2000 | Saint Paul | Elected in 1976. Died. |
| Andrew Volstead | Republican | 7th | March 4, 1903 – March 3, 1923 | Granite Falls | Elected in 1902. Lost re-election to O. Kvale. |
| James Wakefield | Republican | 2nd | March 4, 1883 – March 3, 1887 | Winnebago City | Elected in 1882. Retired. |
| Tim Walz | Democratic–Farmer–Labor | 1st | January 3, 2007 – January 3, 2019 | Mankato | Elected in 2006. Retired to run for governor. |
| William D. Washburn | Republican | 3rd | March 4, 1879 – March 3, 1883 | Minneapolis | Elected in 1878. Redistricted to the 4th district. |
| William D. Washburn | Republican | 4th | March 4, 1883 – March 3, 1885 | Minneapolis | Redistricted from the 3rd district and re-elected in 1882. Lost renomination to Gilfillan. |
| Vin Weber | Republican | 6th | January 3, 1981 – January 3, 1983 | St. Cloud | Elected in 1980. Redistricted to the 2nd district. |
| Vin Weber | Republican | 2nd | January 3, 1983 – January 3, 1993 | St. Cloud | Redistricted from the 6th district and re-elected in 1982. Retired. |
| Knud Wefald | Farmer–Labor | 9th | March 4, 1923 – March 3, 1927 | Hawley | Elected in 1922. Lost re-election to Selvig. |
| Milo White | Republican | 1st | March 4, 1883 – March 3, 1887 | Chatfield | Elected in 1882. Retired. |
| Roy Wier | Democratic–Farmer–Labor | 3rd | January 3, 1949 – January 3, 1961 | Minneapolis | Elected in 1948. Lost re-election to MacGregor. |
| Thomas Wilson | Democratic | 1st | March 4, 1887 – March 3, 1889 | Winona | Elected in 1886. Lost re-election to Dunnell. |
| Eugene McLanahan Wilson | Democratic | 2nd | March 4, 1869 – March 3, 1871 | Winona | Elected in 1868. Lost re-election to Averill. |
| Morton S. Wilkinson | Republican | 1st | March 4, 1869 – March 3, 1871 | Mankato | Elected in 1868. Lost renomination to Dunnell. |
| William Windom | Republican | At-large | March 4, 1859 – March 3, 1863 | Winona | Elected in 1859. Redistricted to the 1st district. |
| William Windom | Republican | 1st | March 4, 1863 – March 3, 1869 | Winona | Redistricted from the at-large district and re-elected in 1862. Retired. |
| Oscar Youngdahl | Republican | 5th | January 3, 1939 – January 3, 1943 | Minneapolis | Elected in 1938. Lost renomination to Judd. |
| John M. Zwach | Republican | 6th | January 3, 1967 – January 3, 1975 | Lucan | Elected in 1966. Retired. |

== See also ==
- List of United States senators from Minnesota
- Minnesota's congressional delegations
- Minnesota's congressional districts
