= Minnesota's congressional delegations =

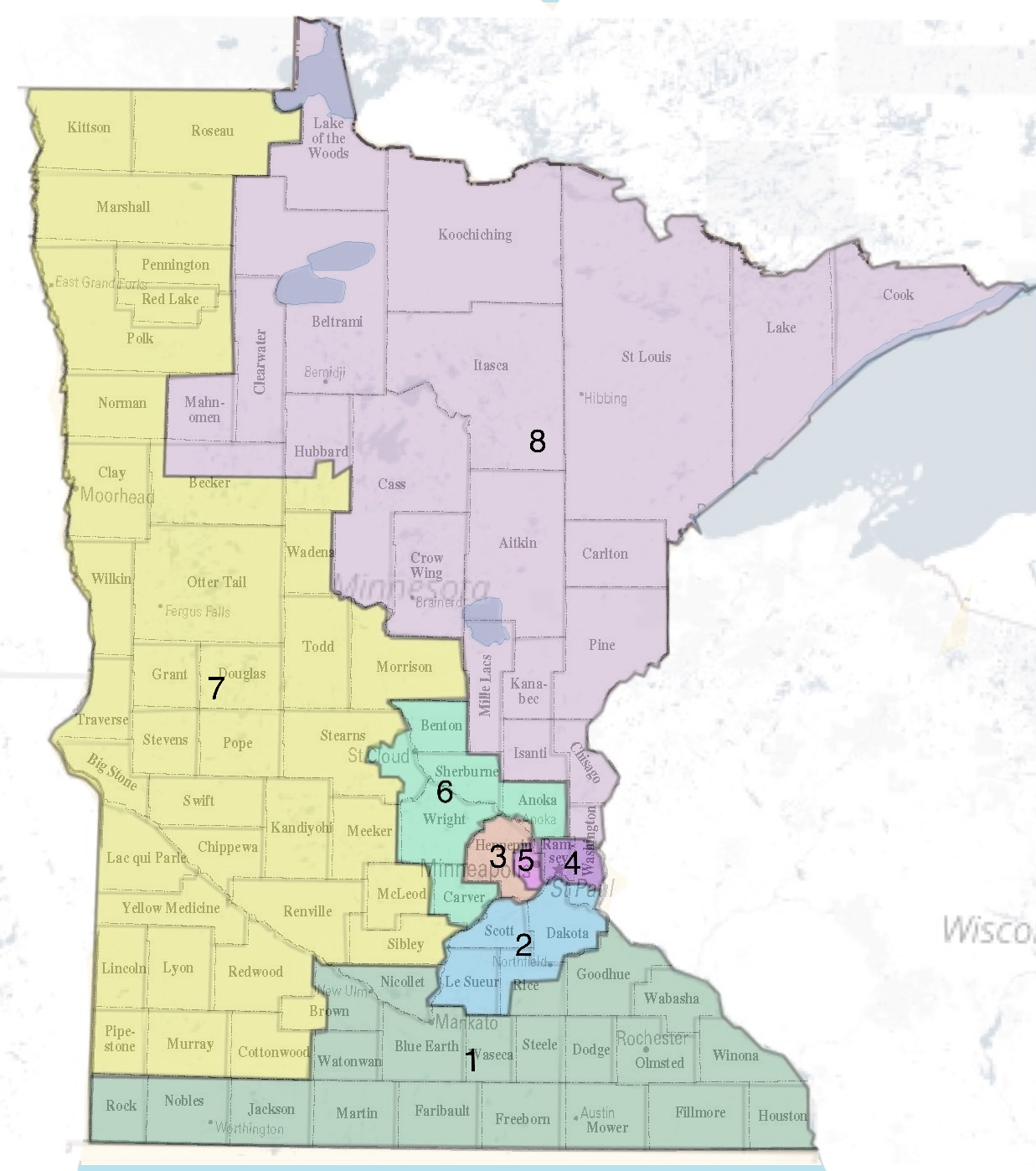

Minnesota's congressional districts since 2023

These are tables of congressional delegations from Minnesota to the United States House of Representatives and the United States Senate.

The current dean of the Minnesota delegation is Representative Betty McCollum (MN-4), having served in the House since 2001.

== U.S. House of Representatives ==
=== Current members ===
The House delegation has 8 members, including 4 Democrats and 4 Republicans.

Current U.S. representatives from Minnesota
District	Member (Residence)	Party	Incumbent since	CPVI (2025)	District map
1st	Brad Finstad (New Ulm)	Republican	August 12, 2022	R+6	
2nd	Angie Craig (Prior Lake)	Democratic (DFL)	January 3, 2019	D+3	
3rd	Kelly Morrison (Wayzata)	Democratic (DFL)	January 3, 2025	D+11	
4th	Betty McCollum (Saint Paul)	Democratic (DFL)	January 3, 2001	D+18	
5th	Ilhan Omar (Minneapolis)	Democratic (DFL)	January 3, 2019	D+32	
6th	Tom Emmer (Delano)	Republican	January 3, 2015	R+10	
7th	Michelle Fischbach (Regal)	Republican	January 3, 2021	R+18	
8th	Pete Stauber (Hermantown)	Republican	January 3, 2019	R+7	

=== List of representatives ===
==== Delegates from Minnesota Territory ====
Congress	Delegate
31st (1849–1850)	Henry Hastings Sibley (D)
32nd (1851–1852)	Henry Hastings Sibley (D)
33rd (1853–1854)	Henry M. Rice (D)
34th (1855–1856)	Henry M. Rice (D)
35th (1857–1858)	William W. Kingsbury (D)

==== 1858–1883 ====
Congress	Statewide at-large on a general ticket		
Congress	1st seat	2nd seat	
35th (1857–1859)	James M. Cavanaugh (D)	William Wallace Phelps (D)	
36th (1859–1861)	William Windom (R)	Cyrus Aldrich (R)	
37th (1861–1863)	William Windom (R)	Cyrus Aldrich (R)	
Congress	District		
Congress	1st	2nd	3rd
38th (1863–1865)	William Windom (R)	Ignatius L. Donnelly (R)	3rd
39th (1865–1867)	William Windom (R)	Ignatius L. Donnelly (R)	3rd
40th (1867–1869)	William Windom (R)	Ignatius L. Donnelly (R)	3rd
41st (1869–1871)	Morton S. Wilkinson (R)	Eugene McLanahan Wilson (D)	3rd
42nd (1871–1873)	Mark H. Dunnell (R)	John T. Averill (R)	3rd
43rd (1873–1875)	Mark H. Dunnell (R)	Horace B. Strait (R)	John T. Averill (R)
44th (1875–1877)	Mark H. Dunnell (R)	Horace B. Strait (R)	William S. King (R)
45th (1877–1879)	Mark H. Dunnell (R)	Horace B. Strait (R)	Jacob H. Stewart (R)
46th (1879–1881)	Mark H. Dunnell (R)	Henry Poehler (D)	William D. Washburn (R)
47th (1881–1883)	Mark H. Dunnell (R)	Horace B. Strait (R)	William D. Washburn (R)

===== 1883–1903 =====
	District						
	1st	2nd	3rd	4th	5th	6th	7th
48th (1883–1885)	Milo White (R)	James Wakefield (R)	Horace B. Strait (R)	William D. Washburn (R)	Knute Nelson (R)	6th	7th
49th (1885–1887)	Milo White (R)	James Wakefield (R)	Horace B. Strait (R)	John Gilfillan (R)	Knute Nelson (R)	6th	7th
50th (1887–1889)	Thomas Wilson (D)	John Lind (R)	John L. MacDonald (D)	Edmund Rice (D)	Knute Nelson (R)	6th	7th
51st (1889–1891)	Mark H. Dunnell (R)	John Lind (R)	Darwin Hall (R)	Samuel Snider (R)	Solomon Comstock (R)	6th	7th
52nd (1891–1893)	William H. Harries (D)	John Lind (R)	Osee M. Hall (D)	James Castle (D)	Kittel Halvorson (Pop)	6th	7th
53rd (1893–1895)	James A. Tawney (R)	James McCleary (R)	Osee M. Hall (D)	Andrew Kiefer (R)	Loren Fletcher (R)	Melvin Baldwin (D)	Haldor Boen (Pop)
54th (1895–1897)	James A. Tawney (R)	James McCleary (R)	Joel Heatwole (R)	Andrew Kiefer (R)	Loren Fletcher (R)	Charles A. Towne (R)	Frank Eddy (R)
55th (1897–1899)	James A. Tawney (R)	James McCleary (R)	Joel Heatwole (R)	Frederick Stevens (R)	Loren Fletcher (R)	Page Morris (R)	Frank Eddy (R)
56th (1899–1901)	James A. Tawney (R)	James McCleary (R)	Joel Heatwole (R)	Frederick Stevens (R)	Loren Fletcher (R)	Page Morris (R)	Frank Eddy (R)
57th (1901–1903)	James A. Tawney (R)	James McCleary (R)	Joel Heatwole (R)	Frederick Stevens (R)	Loren Fletcher (R)	Page Morris (R)	Frank Eddy (R)

===== 1903–1933 =====
	District									
	1st	2nd	3rd	4th	5th	6th	7th	8th	9th	10th
58th (1903–1905)	James A. Tawney (R)	James; McCleary (R)	Charles Russell; Davis (R)	Frederick; Stevens (R)	John Lind (D)	Clarence; Buckman (R)	Andrew; Volstead (R)	J. Adam; Bede (R)	Halvor; Steenerson (R)	10th
59th (1905–1907)	James A. Tawney (R)	James; McCleary (R)	Charles Russell; Davis (R)	Frederick; Stevens (R)	Loren Fletcher (R)	Clarence; Buckman (R)	Andrew; Volstead (R)	J. Adam; Bede (R)	Halvor; Steenerson (R)	10th
60th (1907–1909)	James A. Tawney (R)	Winfield Scott; Hammond (D)	Charles Russell; Davis (R)	Frederick; Stevens (R)	Frank Nye (R)	Charles August; Lindbergh (R)	Andrew; Volstead (R)	J. Adam; Bede (R)	Halvor; Steenerson (R)	10th
61st (1909–1911)	James A. Tawney (R)	Winfield Scott; Hammond (D)	Charles Russell; Davis (R)	Frederick; Stevens (R)	Frank Nye (R)	Charles August; Lindbergh (R)	Andrew; Volstead (R)	Clarence B. Miller (R)	Halvor; Steenerson (R)	10th
62nd (1911–1913)	Sydney; Anderson (R)	Winfield Scott; Hammond (D)	Charles Russell; Davis (R)	Frederick; Stevens (R)	Frank Nye (R)	Charles August; Lindbergh (R)	Andrew; Volstead (R)	Clarence B. Miller (R)	Halvor; Steenerson (R)	10th
63rd (1913–1915)	Sydney; Anderson (R)	Winfield Scott; Hammond (D)	Charles Russell; Davis (R)	Frederick; Stevens (R)	George Ross; Smith (R)	Charles August; Lindbergh (R)	Andrew; Volstead (R)	Clarence B. Miller (R)	Halvor; Steenerson (R)	At-large: James Manahan (R)
64th (1915–1917)	Sydney; Anderson (R)	Franklin; Ellsworth (R)	Charles Russell; Davis (R)	Carl; Van Dyke (D)	George Ross; Smith (R)	Charles August; Lindbergh (R)	Andrew; Volstead (R)	Clarence B. Miller (R)	Halvor; Steenerson (R)	Thomas D. Schall (P)
65th (1917–1919)	Sydney; Anderson (R)	Franklin; Ellsworth (R)	Charles Russell; Davis (R)	Carl; Van Dyke (D)	Ernest Lundeen (R)	Harold; Knutson (R)	Andrew; Volstead (R)	Clarence B. Miller (R)	Halvor; Steenerson (R)	Thomas D. Schall (R)
66th (1919–1921)	Sydney; Anderson (R)	Franklin; Ellsworth (R)	Charles Russell; Davis (R)	Carl; Van Dyke (D)	Walter; Newton (R)	Harold; Knutson (R)	Andrew; Volstead (R)	William L. Carss (FL)	Halvor; Steenerson (R)	Thomas D. Schall (R)
66th (1919–1921)	Sydney; Anderson (R)	Franklin; Ellsworth (R)	Charles Russell; Davis (R)	Oscar; Keller (R)	Walter; Newton (R)	Harold; Knutson (R)	Andrew; Volstead (R)	William L. Carss (FL)	Halvor; Steenerson (R)	Thomas D. Schall (R)
67th (1921–1923)	Sydney; Anderson (R)	Frank; Clague (R)	Charles Russell; Davis (R)	Oscar; Keller (R)	Walter; Newton (R)	Harold; Knutson (R)	Andrew; Volstead (R)	Oscar; Larson (R)	Halvor; Steenerson (R)	Thomas D. Schall (R)
68th (1923–1925)	Sydney; Anderson (R)	Frank; Clague (R)	Charles Russell; Davis (R)	Oscar; Keller (R)	Walter; Newton (R)	Harold; Knutson (R)	Ole J. Kvale (FL)	Oscar; Larson (R)	Knud Wefald (FL)	Thomas D. Schall (R)
69th (1925–1927)	Allen J. Furlow (R)	Frank; Clague (R)	August H. Andresen (R)	Oscar; Keller (R)	Walter; Newton (R)	Harold; Knutson (R)	Ole J. Kvale (FL)	William L. Carss (FL)	Knud Wefald (FL)	Godfrey G. Goodwin (R)
70th (1927–1929)	Allen J. Furlow (R)	Frank; Clague (R)	August H. Andresen (R)	Melvin Maas (R)	Walter; Newton (R)	Harold; Knutson (R)	Ole J. Kvale (FL)	William L. Carss (FL)	Conrad; Selvig (R)	Godfrey G. Goodwin (R)
71st (1929–1931)	Victor; Christgau (R)	Frank; Clague (R)	August H. Andresen (R)	Melvin Maas (R)	Walter; Newton (R)	Harold; Knutson (R)	Ole J. Kvale (FL)	William Alvin; Pittenger (R)	Conrad; Selvig (R)	Godfrey G. Goodwin (R)
71st (1929–1931)	Victor; Christgau (R)	Frank; Clague (R)	August H. Andresen (R)	Melvin Maas (R)	William I. Nolan (R)	Harold; Knutson (R)	Paul J. Kvale (FL)	William Alvin; Pittenger (R)	Conrad; Selvig (R)	Godfrey G. Goodwin (R)
72nd (1931–1933)	Victor; Christgau (R)	Frank; Clague (R)	August H. Andresen (R)	Melvin Maas (R)	William I. Nolan (R)	Harold; Knutson (R)	Paul J. Kvale (FL)	William Alvin; Pittenger (R)	Conrad; Selvig (R)	Godfrey G. Goodwin (R)

===== 1933–present =====
	At-large statewide on a general ticket								
	1st seat	2nd seat	3rd seat	4th seat	5th seat	6th seat	7th seat	8th seat	9th seat
73rd (1933–1935)	Henry M. Arens (FL)	Einar Hoidale (D)	Ernest Lundeen (FL)	Ray P. Chase (R)	Theodore; Christianson (R)	Harold; Knutson (R)	Paul J. Kvale (FL)	Magnus; Johnson (FL)	Francis; Shoemaker (FL)
	District								
	1st	2nd	3rd	4th	5th	6th	7th	8th	9th
74th (1935–1937)	August H. Andresen (R)	Elmer Ryan (D)	Ernest Lundeen (FL)	Melvin Maas (R)	Theodore; Christianson (R)	Harold; Knutson (R)	Paul J. Kvale (FL)	William A. Pittenger (R)	Rich T. Buckler (FL)
75th (1937–1939)	August H. Andresen (R)	Elmer Ryan (D)	Henry Teigan (FL)	Melvin Maas (R)	Dewey Johnson (FL)	Harold; Knutson (R)	Paul J. Kvale (FL)	John Bernard (FL)	Rich T. Buckler (FL)
76th (1939–1941)	August H. Andresen (R)	Elmer Ryan (D)	John G. Alexander (R)	Melvin Maas (R)	Oscar Youngdahl (R)	Harold; Knutson (R)	H. Carl; Andersen (R)	William A. Pittenger (R)	Rich T. Buckler (FL)
77th (1941–1943)	August H. Andresen (R)	Joseph P. O'Hara (R)	Richard P. Gale (R)	Melvin Maas (R)	Oscar Youngdahl (R)	Harold; Knutson (R)	H. Carl; Andersen (R)	William A. Pittenger (R)	Rich T. Buckler (FL)
78th (1943–1945)	August H. Andresen (R)	Joseph P. O'Hara (R)	Richard P. Gale (R)	Melvin Maas (R)	Walter; Judd (R)	Harold; Knutson (R)	H. Carl; Andersen (R)	William A. Pittenger (R)	Harold Hagen (FL)
79th (1945–1947)	August H. Andresen (R)	Joseph P. O'Hara (R)	William Gallagher (DFL)	Frank Starkey (DFL)	Walter; Judd (R)	Harold; Knutson (R)	H. Carl; Andersen (R)	William A. Pittenger (R)	Harold; Hagen (R)
80th (1947–1949)	August H. Andresen (R)	Joseph P. O'Hara (R)	George MacKinnon (R)	Edward Devitt (R)	Walter; Judd (R)	Harold; Knutson (R)	H. Carl; Andersen (R)	John; Blatnik (DFL)	Harold; Hagen (R)
81st (1949–1951)	August H. Andresen (R)	Joseph P. O'Hara (R)	Roy Wier (DFL)	Eugene; McCarthy (DFL)	Walter; Judd (R)	Fred; Marshall (DFL)	H. Carl; Andersen (R)	John; Blatnik (DFL)	Harold; Hagen (R)
82nd (1951–1953)	August H. Andresen (R)	Joseph P. O'Hara (R)	Roy Wier (DFL)	Eugene; McCarthy (DFL)	Walter; Judd (R)	Fred; Marshall (DFL)	H. Carl; Andersen (R)	John; Blatnik (DFL)	Harold; Hagen (R)
83rd (1953–1955)	August H. Andresen (R)	Joseph P. O'Hara (R)	Roy Wier (DFL)	Eugene; McCarthy (DFL)	Walter; Judd (R)	Fred; Marshall (DFL)	H. Carl; Andersen (R)	John; Blatnik (DFL)	Harold; Hagen (R)
84th (1955–1957)	August H. Andresen (R)	Joseph P. O'Hara (R)	Roy Wier (DFL)	Eugene; McCarthy (DFL)	Walter; Judd (R)	Fred; Marshall (DFL)	H. Carl; Andersen (R)	John; Blatnik (DFL)	Coya; Knutson (DFL)
85th (1957–1959)	August H. Andresen (R)	Joseph P. O'Hara (R)	Roy Wier (DFL)	Eugene; McCarthy (DFL)	Walter; Judd (R)	Fred; Marshall (DFL)	H. Carl; Andersen (R)	John; Blatnik (DFL)	Coya; Knutson (DFL)
85th (1957–1959)	Al Quie (R)	Joseph P. O'Hara (R)	Roy Wier (DFL)	Eugene; McCarthy (DFL)	Walter; Judd (R)	Fred; Marshall (DFL)	H. Carl; Andersen (R)	John; Blatnik (DFL)	Coya; Knutson (DFL)
86th (1959–1961)	Al Quie (R)	Ancher; Nelsen (R)	Roy Wier (DFL)	Joseph; Karth (DFL)	Walter; Judd (R)	Fred; Marshall (DFL)	H. Carl; Andersen (R)	John; Blatnik (DFL)	Odin; Langen (R)
87th (1961–1963)	Al Quie (R)	Ancher; Nelsen (R)	Clark; McGregor (R)	Joseph; Karth (DFL)	Walter; Judd (R)	Fred; Marshall (DFL)	H. Carl; Andersen (R)	John; Blatnik (DFL)	Odin; Langen (R)
88th (1963–1965)	Al Quie (R)	Ancher; Nelsen (R)	Clark; McGregor (R)	Joseph; Karth (DFL)	Donald M. Fraser (DFL)	Alec G. Olson (DFL)	Odin Langen (R)	John; Blatnik (DFL)	
89th (1965–1967)	Al Quie (R)	Ancher; Nelsen (R)	Clark; McGregor (R)	Joseph; Karth (DFL)	Donald M. Fraser (DFL)	Alec G. Olson (DFL)	Odin Langen (R)	John; Blatnik (DFL)	
90th (1967–1969)	Al Quie (R)	Ancher; Nelsen (R)	Clark; McGregor (R)	Joseph; Karth (DFL)	Donald M. Fraser (DFL)	John M. Zwach (R)	Odin Langen (R)	John; Blatnik (DFL)	
91st (1969–1971)	Al Quie (R)	Ancher; Nelsen (R)	Clark; McGregor (R)	Joseph; Karth (DFL)	Donald M. Fraser (DFL)	John M. Zwach (R)	Odin Langen (R)	John; Blatnik (DFL)	
92nd (1971–1973)	Al Quie (R)	Ancher; Nelsen (R)	Bill; Frenzel (R)	Joseph; Karth (DFL)	Donald M. Fraser (DFL)	John M. Zwach (R)	Bob; Bergland (DFL)	John; Blatnik (DFL)	
93rd (1973–1975)	Al Quie (R)	Ancher; Nelsen (R)	Bill; Frenzel (R)	Joseph; Karth (DFL)	Donald M. Fraser (DFL)	John M. Zwach (R)	Bob; Bergland (DFL)	John; Blatnik (DFL)	
94th (1975–1977)	Al Quie (R)	Tom; Hagedorn (I-R)	Bill; Frenzel (R)	Joseph; Karth (DFL)	Donald M. Fraser (DFL)	Rick Nolan (DFL)	Bob; Bergland (DFL)	Jim; Oberstar (DFL)	
95th (1977–1979)	Al Quie (R)	Tom; Hagedorn (I-R)	Bill; Frenzel (R)	Bruce; Vento (DFL)	Donald M. Fraser (DFL)	Rick Nolan (DFL)	Bob; Bergland (DFL)	Jim; Oberstar (DFL)	
95th (1977–1979)	Al Quie (R)	Tom; Hagedorn (I-R)	Bill; Frenzel (R)	Bruce; Vento (DFL)	Donald M. Fraser (DFL)	Rick Nolan (DFL)	Arlan; Stangeland (I-R)	Jim; Oberstar (DFL)	
96th (1979–1981)	Arlen; Erdahl (I-R)	Tom; Hagedorn (I-R)	Bill; Frenzel (R)	Bruce; Vento (DFL)	Martin Olav; Sabo (DFL)	Rick Nolan (DFL)	Arlan; Stangeland (I-R)	Jim; Oberstar (DFL)	
97th (1981–1983)	Arlen; Erdahl (I-R)	Tom; Hagedorn (I-R)	Bill; Frenzel (R)	Bruce; Vento (DFL)	Martin Olav; Sabo (DFL)	Vin Weber (I-R)	Arlan; Stangeland (I-R)	Jim; Oberstar (DFL)	
98th (1983–1985)	Tim; Penny (DFL)	Vin Weber (I-R)	Bill; Frenzel (R)	Bruce; Vento (DFL)	Martin Olav; Sabo (DFL)	Gerry; Sikorski (DFL)	Arlan; Stangeland (I-R)	Jim; Oberstar (DFL)	
99th (1985–1987)	Tim; Penny (DFL)	Vin Weber (I-R)	Bill; Frenzel (R)	Bruce; Vento (DFL)	Martin Olav; Sabo (DFL)	Gerry; Sikorski (DFL)	Arlan; Stangeland (I-R)	Jim; Oberstar (DFL)	
100th (1987–1989)	Tim; Penny (DFL)	Vin Weber (I-R)	Bill; Frenzel (R)	Bruce; Vento (DFL)	Martin Olav; Sabo (DFL)	Gerry; Sikorski (DFL)	Arlan; Stangeland (I-R)	Jim; Oberstar (DFL)	
101st (1989–1991)	Tim; Penny (DFL)	Vin Weber (I-R)	Bill; Frenzel (R)	Bruce; Vento (DFL)	Martin Olav; Sabo (DFL)	Gerry; Sikorski (DFL)	Arlan; Stangeland (I-R)	Jim; Oberstar (DFL)	
102nd (1991–1993)	Tim; Penny (DFL)	Vin Weber (I-R)	Jim; Ramstad (R)	Bruce; Vento (DFL)	Martin Olav; Sabo (DFL)	Gerry; Sikorski (DFL)	Collin; Peterson (DFL)	Jim; Oberstar (DFL)	
103rd (1993–1995)	Tim; Penny (DFL)	David; Minge (DFL)	Jim; Ramstad (R)	Bruce; Vento (DFL)	Martin Olav; Sabo (DFL)	Rod Grams (I-R)	Collin; Peterson (DFL)	Jim; Oberstar (DFL)	
104th (1995–1997)	Gil Gutknecht (R)	David; Minge (DFL)	Jim; Ramstad (R)	Bruce; Vento (DFL)	Martin Olav; Sabo (DFL)	Bill Luther (DFL)	Collin; Peterson (DFL)	Jim; Oberstar (DFL)	
105th (1997–1999)	Gil Gutknecht (R)	David; Minge (DFL)	Jim; Ramstad (R)	Bruce; Vento (DFL)	Martin Olav; Sabo (DFL)	Bill Luther (DFL)	Collin; Peterson (DFL)	Jim; Oberstar (DFL)	
106th (1999–2001)	Gil Gutknecht (R)	David; Minge (DFL)	Jim; Ramstad (R)	Bruce; Vento (DFL)	Martin Olav; Sabo (DFL)	Bill Luther (DFL)	Collin; Peterson (DFL)	Jim; Oberstar (DFL)	
107th (2001–2003)	Gil Gutknecht (R)	Mark Kennedy (R)	Jim; Ramstad (R)	Betty; McCollum (DFL)	Martin Olav; Sabo (DFL)	Bill Luther (DFL)	Collin; Peterson (DFL)	Jim; Oberstar (DFL)	
108th (2003–2005)	Gil Gutknecht (R)	John; Kline (R)	Jim; Ramstad (R)	Betty; McCollum (DFL)	Martin Olav; Sabo (DFL)	Mark; Kennedy (R)	Collin; Peterson (DFL)	Jim; Oberstar (DFL)	
109th (2005–2007)	Gil Gutknecht (R)	John; Kline (R)	Jim; Ramstad (R)	Betty; McCollum (DFL)	Martin Olav; Sabo (DFL)	Mark; Kennedy (R)	Collin; Peterson (DFL)	Jim; Oberstar (DFL)	
110th (2007–2009)	Tim Walz (DFL)	John; Kline (R)	Jim; Ramstad (R)	Betty; McCollum (DFL)	Keith; Ellison (DFL)	Michele; Bachmann (R)	Collin; Peterson (DFL)	Jim; Oberstar (DFL)	
111th (2009–2011)	Tim Walz (DFL)	John; Kline (R)	Erik Paulsen (R)	Betty; McCollum (DFL)	Keith; Ellison (DFL)	Michele; Bachmann (R)	Collin; Peterson (DFL)	Jim; Oberstar (DFL)	
112th (2011–2013)	Tim Walz (DFL)	John; Kline (R)	Erik Paulsen (R)	Betty; McCollum (DFL)	Keith; Ellison (DFL)	Michele; Bachmann (R)	Collin; Peterson (DFL)	Chip Cravaack (R)	
113th (2013–2015)	Tim Walz (DFL)	John; Kline (R)	Erik Paulsen (R)	Betty; McCollum (DFL)	Keith; Ellison (DFL)	Michele; Bachmann (R)	Collin; Peterson (DFL)	Rick; Nolan (DFL)	
114th (2015–2017)	Tim Walz (DFL)	John; Kline (R)	Erik Paulsen (R)	Betty; McCollum (DFL)	Keith; Ellison (DFL)	Tom; Emmer (R)	Collin; Peterson (DFL)	Rick; Nolan (DFL)	
115th (2017–2019)	Tim Walz (DFL)	Jason Lewis (R)	Erik Paulsen (R)	Betty; McCollum (DFL)	Keith; Ellison (DFL)	Tom; Emmer (R)	Collin; Peterson (DFL)	Rick; Nolan (DFL)	
116th (2019–2021)	Jim Hagedorn (R)	Angie; Craig (DFL)	Dean; Phillips (DFL)	Betty; McCollum (DFL)	Ilhan; Omar (DFL)	Tom; Emmer (R)	Collin; Peterson (DFL)	Pete; Stauber (R)	
117th (2021–2023)	Jim Hagedorn (R)	Angie; Craig (DFL)	Dean; Phillips (DFL)	Betty; McCollum (DFL)	Ilhan; Omar (DFL)	Tom; Emmer (R)	Michelle; Fishbach (R)	Pete; Stauber (R)	
117th (2021–2023)	Brad Finstad (R)	Angie; Craig (DFL)	Dean; Phillips (DFL)	Betty; McCollum (DFL)	Ilhan; Omar (DFL)	Tom; Emmer (R)	Michelle; Fishbach (R)	Pete; Stauber (R)	
118th (2023–2025)	Brad Finstad (R)	Angie; Craig (DFL)	Dean; Phillips (DFL)	Betty; McCollum (DFL)	Ilhan; Omar (DFL)	Tom; Emmer (R)	Michelle; Fishbach (R)	Pete; Stauber (R)	
119th (2025–2027)	Brad Finstad (R)	Angie; Craig (DFL)	Kelly; Morrison (DFL)	Betty; McCollum (DFL)	Ilhan; Omar (DFL)	Tom; Emmer (R)	Michelle; Fishbach (R)	Pete; Stauber (R)	
120th (2027–2029)	Jake; Johnson (DFL)	Matt; Little (DFL)	Kelly; Morrison (DFL)	Betty; McCollum (DFL)	Ilhan; Omar (DFL)	Tom; Emmer (R)	Michelle; Fishbach (R)	Pete; Stauber (R)	
Congress	1st	2nd	3rd	4th	5th	6th	7th	8th	
Congress	District								

== United States Senate ==
Current U.S. senators from Minnesota
Minnesota CPVI (2025): D+3	Class I senator	Class II senator
Minnesota CPVI (2025): D+3	Amy Klobuchar (Senior senator) (Minneapolis)	Tina Smith (Junior senator) (Minneapolis)
Party	Democratic	Democratic
Incumbent since	January 3, 2007	January 3, 2018

Class I	Congress	Class II
Henry M. Rice (D)	35th (1858–1859)	James Shields (D)
Henry M. Rice (D)	36th (1859–1861)	Morton S. Wilkinson (R)
Henry M. Rice (D)	37th (1861–1863)	Morton S. Wilkinson (R)
Alexander Ramsey (R)	38th (1863–1865)	Morton S. Wilkinson (R)
Alexander Ramsey (R)	39th (1865–1867)	Daniel Sheldon Norton (R)
Alexander Ramsey (R)	40th (1867–1869)	Daniel Sheldon Norton (R)
Alexander Ramsey (R)	41st (1869–1871)	Daniel Sheldon Norton (R)
Alexander Ramsey (R)	41st (1869–1871)	William Windom (R)
Alexander Ramsey (R)	41st (1869–1871)	Ozora P. Stearns (R)
Alexander Ramsey (R)	42nd (1871–1873)	William Windom (R)
Alexander Ramsey (R)	43rd (1873–1875)	William Windom (R)
Samuel J. R. McMillan (R)	44th (1875–1877)	William Windom (R)
Samuel J. R. McMillan (R)	45th (1877–1879)	William Windom (R)
Samuel J. R. McMillan (R)	46th (1879–1881)	William Windom (R)
Samuel J. R. McMillan (R)	47th (1881–1883)	Alonzo J. Edgerton (R)
Samuel J. R. McMillan (R)	47th (1881–1883)	William Windom (R)
Samuel J. R. McMillan (R)	48th (1883–1885)	Dwight M. Sabin (R)
Samuel J. R. McMillan (R)	49th (1885–1887)	Dwight M. Sabin (R)
Cushman K. Davis (R)	50th (1887–1889)	Dwight M. Sabin (R)
Cushman K. Davis (R)	51st (1889–1891)	William D. Washburn (R)
Cushman K. Davis (R)	52nd (1891–1893)	William D. Washburn (R)
Cushman K. Davis (R)	53rd (1893–1895)	William D. Washburn (R)
Cushman K. Davis (R)	54th (1895–1897)	Knute Nelson (R)
Cushman K. Davis (R)	55th (1897–1899)	Knute Nelson (R)
Cushman K. Davis (R)	56th (1899–1901)	Knute Nelson (R)
Charles A. Towne (D)	56th (1899–1901)	Knute Nelson (R)
Moses E. Clapp (R)	56th (1899–1901)	Knute Nelson (R)
Moses E. Clapp (R)	57th (1901–1903)	Knute Nelson (R)
Moses E. Clapp (R)	58th (1903–1905)	Knute Nelson (R)
Moses E. Clapp (R)	59th (1905–1907)	Knute Nelson (R)
Moses E. Clapp (R)	60th (1907–1909)	Knute Nelson (R)
Moses E. Clapp (R)	61st (1909–1911)	Knute Nelson (R)
Moses E. Clapp (R)	62nd (1911–1913)	Knute Nelson (R)
Moses E. Clapp (R)	63rd (1913–1915)	Knute Nelson (R)
Moses E. Clapp (R)	64th (1915–1917)	Knute Nelson (R)
Frank B. Kellogg (R)	65th (1917–1919)	Knute Nelson (R)
Frank B. Kellogg (R)	66th (1919–1921)	Knute Nelson (R)
Frank B. Kellogg (R)	67th (1921–1923)	Knute Nelson (R)
Henrik Shipstead (FL)	68th (1923–1925)	Knute Nelson (R)
Henrik Shipstead (FL)	68th (1923–1925)	Magnus Johnson (FL)
Henrik Shipstead (FL)	69th (1925–1927)	Thomas D. Schall (R)
Henrik Shipstead (FL)	70th (1927–1929)	Thomas D. Schall (R)
Henrik Shipstead (FL)	71st (1929–1931)	Thomas D. Schall (R)
Henrik Shipstead (FL)	72nd (1931–1933)	Thomas D. Schall (R)
Henrik Shipstead (FL)	73rd (1933–1935)	Thomas D. Schall (R)
Henrik Shipstead (FL)	74th (1935–1937)	Thomas D. Schall (R)
Henrik Shipstead (FL)	74th (1935–1937)	Elmer A. Benson (FL)
Henrik Shipstead (FL)	74th (1935–1937)	Guy V. Howard (R)
Henrik Shipstead (FL)	75th (1937–1939)	Ernest Lundeen (FL)
Henrik Shipstead (FL)	76th (1939–1941)	Ernest Lundeen (FL)
Henrik Shipstead (FL)	76th (1939–1941)	Joseph H. Ball (R)
Henrik Shipstead (R)	77th (1941–1943)	Joseph H. Ball (R)
Henrik Shipstead (R)	77th (1941–1943)	Arthur E. Nelson (R)
Henrik Shipstead (R)	78th (1943–1945)	Joseph H. Ball (R)
Henrik Shipstead (R)	79th (1945–1947)	Joseph H. Ball (R)
Edward J. Thye (R)	80th (1947–1949)	Joseph H. Ball (R)
Edward J. Thye (R)	81st (1949–1951)	Hubert Humphrey (DFL)
Edward J. Thye (R)	82nd (1951–1953)	Hubert Humphrey (DFL)
Edward J. Thye (R)	83rd (1953–1955)	Hubert Humphrey (DFL)
Edward J. Thye (R)	84th (1955–1957)	Hubert Humphrey (DFL)
Edward J. Thye (R)	85th (1957–1959)	Hubert Humphrey (DFL)
Eugene McCarthy (DFL)	86th (1959–1961)	Hubert Humphrey (DFL)
Eugene McCarthy (DFL)	87th (1961–1963)	Hubert Humphrey (DFL)
Eugene McCarthy (DFL)	88th (1963–1965)	Hubert Humphrey (DFL)
Eugene McCarthy (DFL)	88th (1963–1965)	Walter Mondale (DFL)
Eugene McCarthy (DFL)	89th (1965–1967)	Walter Mondale (DFL)
Eugene McCarthy (DFL)	90th (1967–1969)	Walter Mondale (DFL)
Eugene McCarthy (DFL)	91st (1969–1971)	Walter Mondale (DFL)
Hubert Humphrey (DFL)	92nd (1971–1973)	Walter Mondale (DFL)
Hubert Humphrey (DFL)	93rd (1973–1975)	Walter Mondale (DFL)
Hubert Humphrey (DFL)	94th (1975–1977)	Walter Mondale (DFL)
Hubert Humphrey (DFL)	94th (1975–1977)	Wendell R. Anderson (DFL)
Hubert Humphrey (DFL)	95th (1977–1979)	Wendell R. Anderson (DFL)
Muriel Humphrey (DFL)	95th (1977–1979)	Wendell R. Anderson (DFL)
David Durenberger (R)	95th (1977–1979)	Rudy Boschwitz (R)
David Durenberger (R)	96th (1979–1981)	Rudy Boschwitz (R)
David Durenberger (R)	97th (1981–1983)	Rudy Boschwitz (R)
David Durenberger (R)	98th (1983–1985)	Rudy Boschwitz (R)
David Durenberger (R)	99th (1985–1987)	Rudy Boschwitz (R)
David Durenberger (R)	100th (1987–1989)	Rudy Boschwitz (R)
David Durenberger (R)	101st (1989–1991)	Rudy Boschwitz (R)
David Durenberger (R)	102nd (1991–1993)	Paul Wellstone (DFL)
David Durenberger (R)	103rd (1993–1995)	Paul Wellstone (DFL)
Rod Grams (R)	104th (1995–1997)	Paul Wellstone (DFL)
Rod Grams (R)	105th (1997–1999)	Paul Wellstone (DFL)
Rod Grams (R)	106th (1999–2001)	Paul Wellstone (DFL)
Mark Dayton (DFL)	107th (2001–2003)	Paul Wellstone (DFL)
Mark Dayton (DFL)	107th (2001–2003)	Dean Barkley (IPM)
Mark Dayton (DFL)	108th (2003–2005)	Norm Coleman (R)
Mark Dayton (DFL)	109th (2005–2007)	Norm Coleman (R)
Amy Klobuchar (DFL)	110th (2007–2009)	Norm Coleman (R)
Amy Klobuchar (DFL)	111th (2009–2011)	Al Franken (DFL)
Amy Klobuchar (DFL)	112th (2011–2013)	Al Franken (DFL)
Amy Klobuchar (DFL)	113th (2013–2015)	Al Franken (DFL)
Amy Klobuchar (DFL)	114th (2015–2017)	Al Franken (DFL)
Amy Klobuchar (DFL)	115th (2017-2019)	Al Franken (DFL)
Amy Klobuchar (DFL)	115th (2017-2019)	Tina Smith (DFL)
Amy Klobuchar (DFL)	116th (2019–2021)	Tina Smith (DFL)
Amy Klobuchar (DFL)	117th (2021–2023)	Tina Smith (DFL)
Amy Klobuchar (DFL)	118th (2023–2025)	Tina Smith (DFL)
Amy Klobuchar (DFL)	119th (2025–2027)	Tina Smith (DFL)
TBA	120th (2027–2029)	Peggy Flanagan (DFL)

== Key ==
Democratic (D)
Democratic–Farmer–Labor (DFL)
Farmer–Labor (FL)
Independence (IPM)
Populist (Pop)
Republican (R)

== See also ==
- List of United States congressional districts
- Minnesota's congressional districts
- Political party strength in Minnesota
