= 1859 United States House of Representatives election in Minnesota =

Minnesota became a new state in 1858 having already elected its first two members at-large in October 1857 to finish the current term. The state then held elections to the next term October 4, 1859.

District	Incumbent			This race	
District	Member	Party	First elected	Results	Candidates
Minnesota at-large 2 seats on a general ticket	James M. Cavanaugh	Democratic	1857	Incumbent lost re-election. New member elected. Republican gain.	✓ Cyrus Aldrich (Republican) 27.54%; ✓ William Windom (Republican) 27.10%; James M. Cavanaugh (Democratic) 22.78%; Christopher C. Graham (Democratic) 22.58%
Minnesota at-large 2 seats on a general ticket	William Wallace Phelps	Democratic	1857	Unknown if incumbent retired or lost re-election. New member elected. Republican gain.	✓ Cyrus Aldrich (Republican) 27.54%; ✓ William Windom (Republican) 27.10%; James M. Cavanaugh (Democratic) 22.78%; Christopher C. Graham (Democratic) 22.58%

== See also ==
- 1858 and 1859 United States House of Representatives elections
- List of United States representatives from Minnesota
- 1858 United States Senate elections in Minnesota
