= USCGC Comanche =

The following ships of the United States Coast Guard have borne the name USCGC Comanche, named after the Native American tribe;

- USCGC Comanche, was the former USRC Windom/USCGC Windom from 13 December 1915 to 31 July 1930
- USCGC Comanche (WPG-76), a United States Coast Guard cutter in service from 1934 to 1947. Scuttled as an artificial reef in 1992
- USCGC Comanche (WMEC-202), medium endurance cutter formerly known as USS Wampanoag (ATA-202), acquired in 1959 and operated until 1980.
