= Samuel McLean (Montana politician) =

American politician (1826–1877)

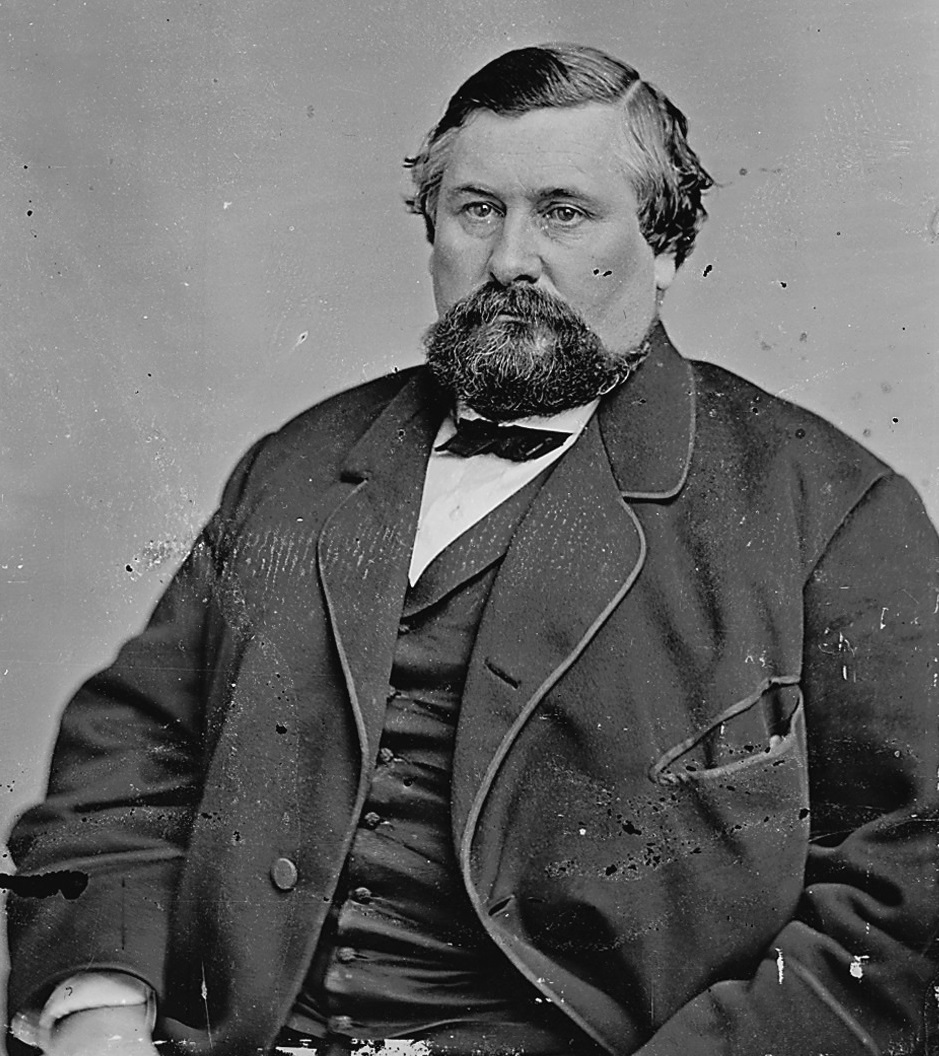
Samuel McLean, Delegate to the U.S. House of Representatives from Montana Territory

Samuel McLean (August 7, 1826 – July 16, 1877) was an American politician who represented Montana in the United States House of Representatives from 1865 to 1867.

McLean was born at Summit Hill, Pennsylvania. He attended the schools of Wyoming Valley and Lafayette College in Easton, Pennsylvania. He studied law with Andrew Horatio Reeder, was admitted to the bar in 1849 and commenced practice in Mauch Chunk, Pennsylvania in present-day Jim Thorpe, Pennsylvania.

McLean served as the prosecuting attorney of Carbon County, Pennsylvania, 1855–1860. He received an honorary Master of Arts degree from Lafayette in 1857.

He served as the attorney general of the provisional Territory of Jefferson (afterward Colorado) in 1860 and then moved to Bannack, Montana, in 1862. He served in the militia as commander of a regiment with the rank of colonel, and was wounded several times during skirmishes against American Indians.

When the Territory of Montana was formed, McLean was elected as a Democrat to the Thirty-eighth and Thirty-ninth Congresses and served from January 6, 1865, to March 3, 1867. He was not a candidate for renomination in 1866. After leaving Congress, he was the president of McLean Silver Mining Co.

McLean later moved to Virginia and settled on a plantation near Burkeville. He died in Burkeville, Virginia on July 16, 1877, and was buried in the churchyard of Burkeville's Presbyterian Church.

U.S. House of Representatives
Preceded by office created	Delegate to the U.S. House of Representatives from Montana Territory; January 6, 1865 - March 3, 1867	Succeeded by James M. Cavanaugh
