= Montana Territory's at-large congressional district =

Obsolete US congressional district

Coordinates: 47°N 110°W

- Obsolete district
- Created: 1864, as a non-voting delegate was granted by Congress
- Eliminated: 1889, as a result of statehood
- Years active: 1864–1889

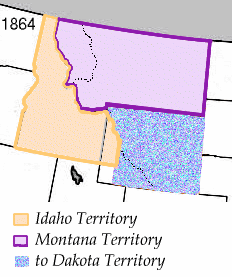
Montana Territory in 1864

Montana Territory's at-large congressional district is an obsolete congressional district that encompassed the area of the Montana Territory, which was split off from the Idaho Territory in 1864. After Montana's admission to the Union as the 41st state by act of Congress on November 8, 1889, this district was dissolved and replaced by Montana's at-large congressional district.

== List of delegates representing the district ==
On May 26, 1864, an act of Congress gave Montana Territory the authority to elect a congressional delegate, though the first delegate did not take his seat until 1865.

Delegate (District home)	Party	Years	Cong ress	Electoral history
Vacant		May 26, 1864 – January 6, 1865	38th	
Samuel McLean (Bannack)	Democratic	January 6, 1865 – March 3, 1867	38th 39th	Elected in 1864. Re-elected in 1865. Retired.
James M. Cavanaugh (Helena)	Democratic	March 4, 1867 – March 3, 1871	40th 41st	Elected in 1866. Re-elected in 1868. Lost renomination.
William H. Clagett (Deer Lodge)	Republican	March 4, 1871 – March 3, 1873	42nd	Elected in 1871. Lost re-election.
Martin Maginnis (Helena)	Democratic	March 4, 1873 – March 3, 1885	43rd 44th 45th 46th 47th 48th	Elected in 1872. Re-elected in 1874. Re-elected in 1876. Re-elected in 1878. Re-elected in 1880. Re-elected in 1882. Retired.
Joseph K. Toole (Helena)	Democratic	March 4, 1885 – March 3, 1889	49th 50th	Elected in 1884. Re-elected in 1886. Retired.
Thomas H. Carter (Helena)	Republican	March 4, 1889 – November 8, 1889	51st	Elected in 1888. Position eliminated upon statehood.
