= John Bernard (American politician) =

French-born American politician (1893–1983)

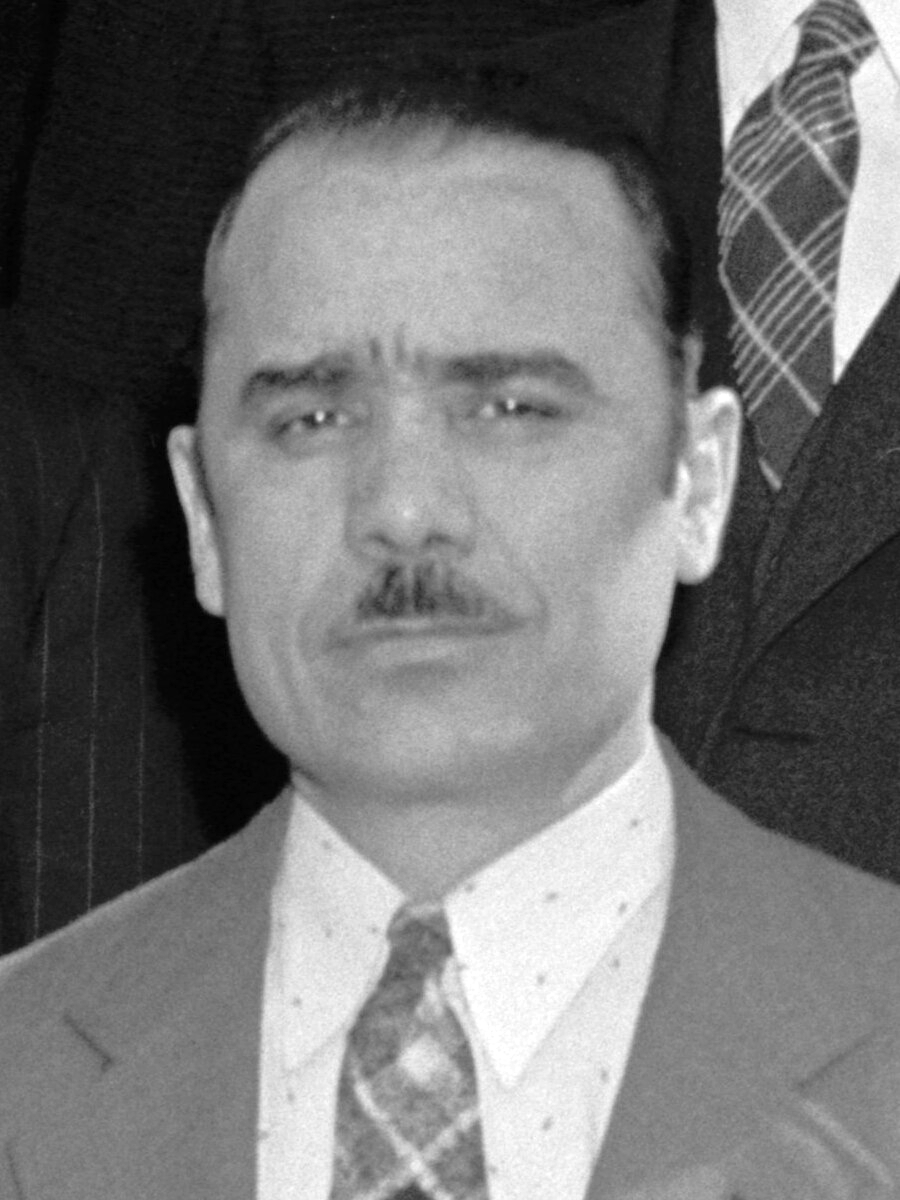
- Bernard in 1938

Member of the U.S. House of Representatives from Minnesota's 8th district
- In office January 3, 1937 – January 3, 1939
- Preceded by: William Pittenger
- Succeeded by: William Pittenger

Personal details
- Born: March 6, 1893 Bastia, Corsica, France
- Died: August 6, 1983 (aged 90) Long Beach, California, U.S.
- Party: Farmer–Labor; Communist
- Spouse: Josephine Dinois
- Children: Marie
- Profession: Miner, fireman, union organizer, politician

John Toussaint Bernard (March 6, 1893 – August 6, 1983) was a United States representative from Minnesota.

== Background ==
Bernard was born in 1893 in Bastia, Corsica, France. In 1907, he immigrated to the United States with his parents, who settled in Eveleth, Minnesota. He went to public schools in both France and in the U.S.

== Career ==
Bernard worked as an iron-ore miner at the Spruce Mine from 1910 to 1916 or 1917.

In 1916 or 1917, Bernard enlisted in the Army and served on the Mexican border. During World War I, he served as an Army Corporal in the 125th Field Artillery. He then became a civilian employee in the Army and Navy Intelligence from 1917 to 1919. He served fifteen months overseas.

After leaving the armed forces and returning home, Bernard found himself blacklisted on the Mesabi Iron Range because of earlier efforts to unionize workers. Instead, he became a city fireman from 1920 to 1936.

=== Politics and activism ===
Bernard served as a delegate to the Minnesota State Farmer-Labor Party conventions in 1936, 1938, and 1940. He was elected as a Farmer-Labor representative to the Seventy-Fifth U.S. Congress (January 3, 1937 - January 3, 1939).

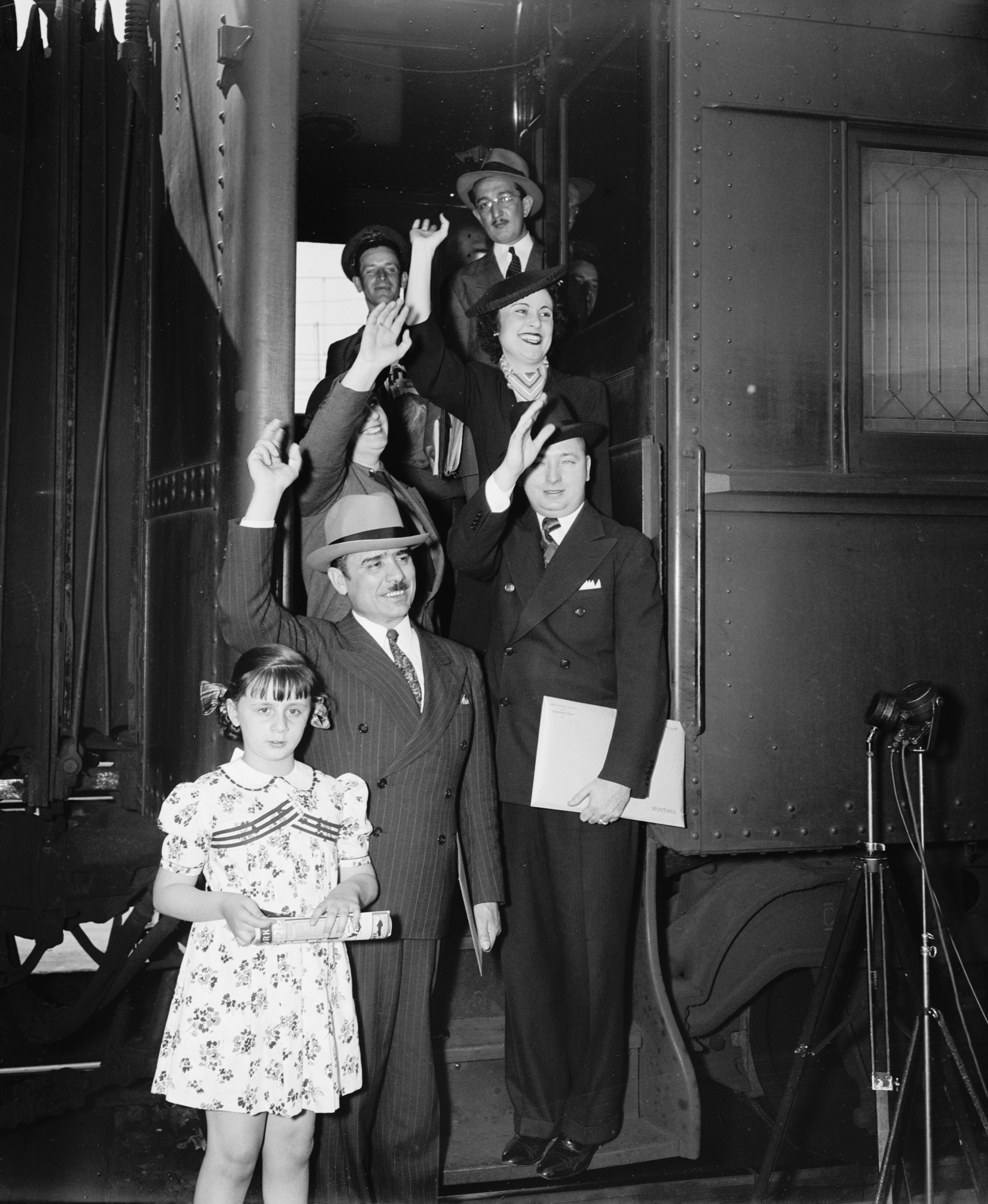
Representatives Bernard (left) and O'Connell (right) leave Union Station with their wives bound for Spain, May 7, 1938. The girl in front is Bernard's daughter.

He and Jerry J. O'Connell were the only two U.S. Congressmen who visited the Second Spanish Republic in October 1937 to support the Soviet-backed Republican faction, which was fighting against the German- and Italian-backed Nationalist faction during the Spanish Civil War.

He ran unsuccessfully for reelection in 1938 to the Seventy-Sixth Congress and again unsuccessfully for election in 1940 to the Seventy-Seventh Congress.

Bernard became engaged as a labor organizer, legislative director, and civil rights activist. He had started working with the Steel Workers Organizing Committee of the CIO in 1937 and continued to 1942. He also worked with the United Electrical, Radio, and Machine Workers of America from 1943 to 1954.

== Personal life and death ==
Bernard met Josephine Dinois while working for the Office of Naval Intelligence in France. They married in 1928 and had at least one child, Marie.

Bernard moved to Long Beach, Calif., where he lived until his death there on August 6, 1983.

== Communism ==
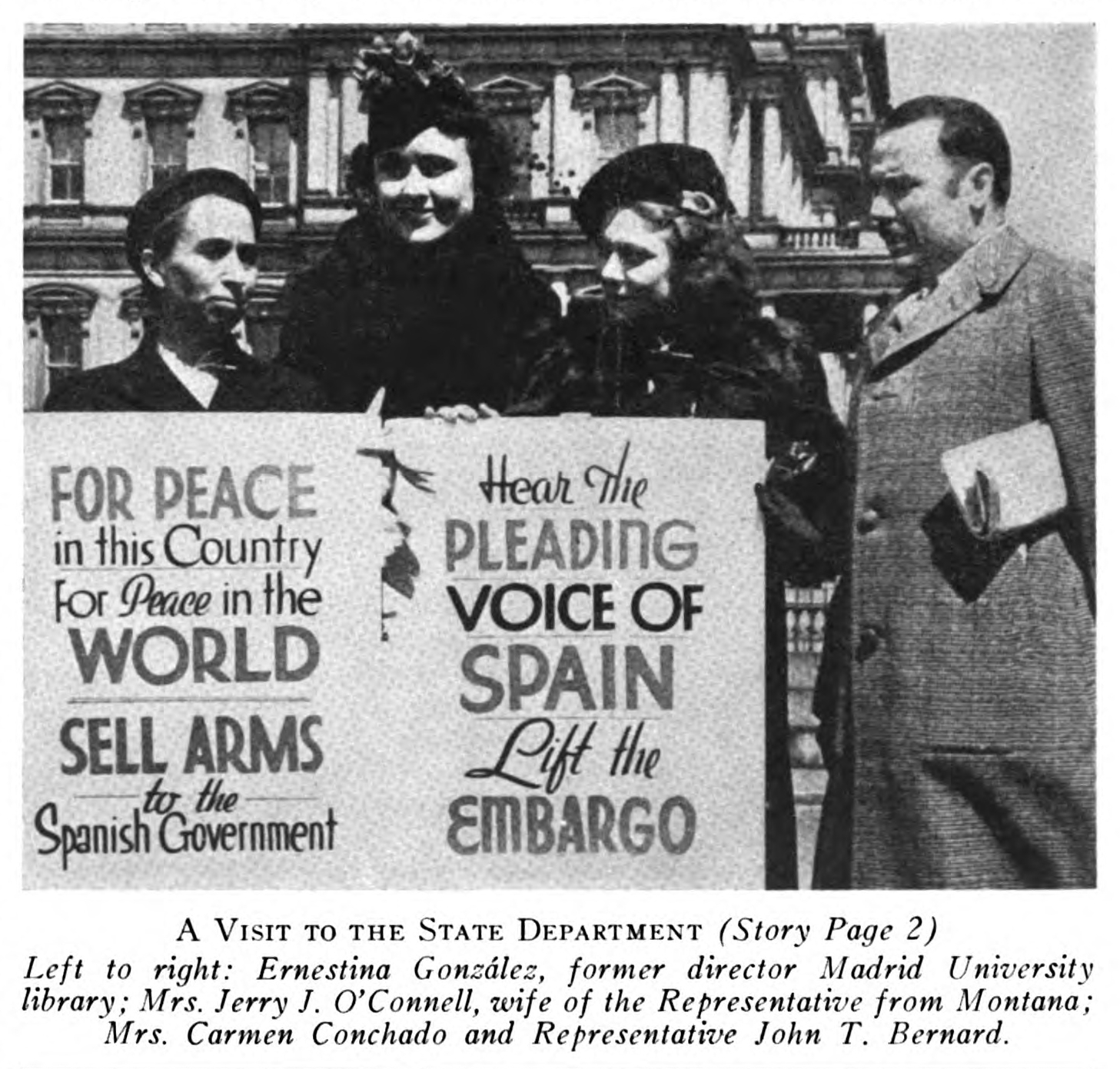
Bernard joins a delegation of Spanish-American women protesting the American embargo on Spain, April 5, 1938

Bernard's single congressional term is notable for his casting the sole vote against an arms embargo against Spain during the Spanish Civil War:

Minnesota Congressman John T. Bernard fought throughout his life for working people against strong opposition. His outspoken and uncompromising views led him, on his second day in office, to cast the single "no" vote in Congress against the Spanish arms embargo. Bernard's vote proved farsighted as the Spanish Civil War became, in many ways, a "dress rehearsal" for World War II.

Less known years later were his strong support for the Communist-backed Popular Front:

Bernard won election in the Farmer-Labor landslide of 1936 ... and quickly became the most enthusiastic and outspoken advocate of the Popular Front in Congress. Not even other Congressmen who sympathized with the Popular Front underlined their links to the Communist Party by inserting, as Bernard did, articles from the Communist Party's Daily Worker into the Congressional Record.

While in office (1937–1939), Bernard's personal secretary in Washington was Marion Bachrach, sister of John Abt, chief counsel of the Communist Party. Former Soviet GRU operative Whittaker Chambers named both Bacharach and Abt among others as members of the Ware Group (his first spy network) during his testimony under subpoena to HUAC on August 3, 1948. That testimony led to the Hiss Case during 1949 and Hiss' conviction in January 1950. Bernard also employed Herman Griffith on his congressional staff. Griffith was a leading Popular Front activist and self-announced CPUSA member.

In 1952, Bernard testified under subpoena before HUAC. For most questions, he asserted his Fifth Amendment privilege. He also asserted his loyalty to America and willingness to defend it.

In 1977, Bernard accepted membership in the Communist Party USA.

== See also ==
- Minnesota's congressional districts
- List of United States congressional districts
- List of Corsican people

U.S. House of Representatives
Preceded by William Pittenger	U.S. Representative from Minnesota's 8th congressional district 1937 – 1939	Succeeded by William Pittenger
