= USRC Windom =

U.S. Revenue cutter

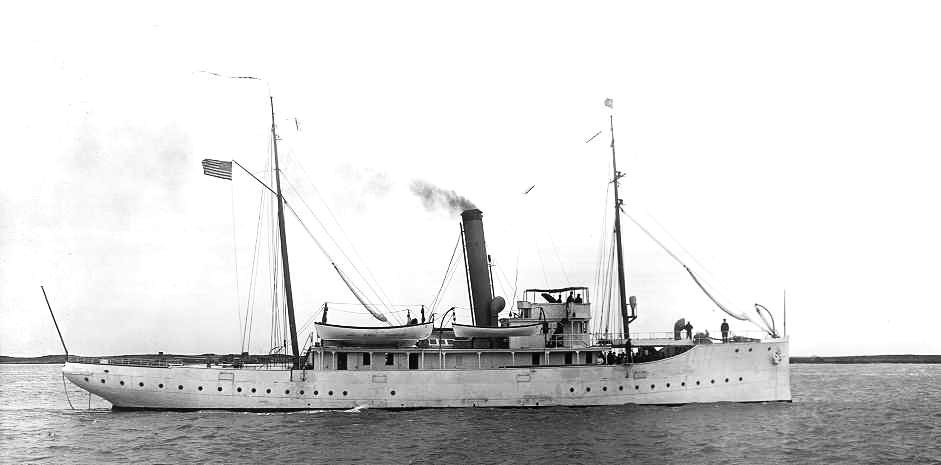

History

United States
- Name: USRC Windom
- Namesake: William Windom
- Builder: Iowa Iron Works, Dubuque, Iowa
- Cost: US$98,500
- Acquired: 11 May 1896
- Commissioned: 30 June 1896
- Decommissioned: 31 July 1930
- Renamed: Comanche, 13 December 1915
- Fate: Sold, 13 November 1930

General characteristics
- Type: Revenue cutter
- Displacement: 535 long tons (544 t)
- Length: 170 ft 8 in (52.02 m)
- Beam: 27 ft (8.2 m)
- Draft: 8 ft 3 in (2.51 m)
- Propulsion: 2 × 800 hp (597 kW) inverted cylinder, triple-expansion, direct acting steam engines, 2 shafts
- Speed: 15 knots (28 km/h; 17 mph)
- Complement: 5 officers, 44 enlisted (World War I)
- Armament: 1 × 3 in (76 mm) gun; 2 × 6-pounder guns

USRC Windom (later Comanche) was a revenue cutter of the United States Revenue Cutter Service and United States Coast Guard that served from 1896 to 1930. She was named for William Windom, the 33rd and 39th United States Secretary of the Treasury. She served during the Spanish–American War with the United States Navy. Windom was recommissioned as USCGC Comanche in 1915 and again served with the Navy as USS Comanche during World War I. (Note: During the time that the Coast Guard was under U.S. Navy control all cutters were prefixed with USS instead of USCGC.)

== Design and construction ==
Windom was constructed in 1896 at the Iowa Iron Works in Dubuque, Iowa and was accepted by the Treasury Department on 11 May 1896. Partially incomplete, she was moved from Dubuque—via Cairo, Illinois, and New Orleans, Louisiana—to the Revenue Cutter Service Depot near Baltimore, Maryland, where she was completed and placed in commission on 30 June 1896. Windom was the first cruising Revenue Service cutter to employ triple-expansion machinery and a fully watertight hull including transverse and longitudinal bulkheads.

== Service history ==
After an initial assignment on 20 October 1896 to Jacksonville, Florida, Windom was transferred to Baltimore on 21 November with an assignment making annual winter cruises of the fishing grounds between the Virginia Capes and Cape Hatteras. On 24 March 1898, she was ordered to cooperate with the U.S. Navy.

=== Spanish–American War ===
In March 1898, with war against Spain looming just over the horizon, President William McKinley began the process of preparing for the fight. On the 24th, he issued the executive order instructing the Revenue Cutter Service to cooperate with the Navy for the duration of the crisis. Two days later, she received orders to report at Norfolk, Virginia, and there she found herself on 25 April when Congress passed the resolution recognizing that a state of war existed between the United States and Spain.

Five days later, Windom departed Hampton Roads on her way to the blockade off Cuba. She stopped at Key West, Florida, for four days and arrived off the Cuban coast on 8 May. She patrolled the southern coast of Cuba near Cienfuegos until the 13th. During that time, she cut the Cienfuegos cable, the Spanish colonial government's only link with the outside world; and, on 12 May, she helped to cover the withdrawal of a Navy boat expedition. At a critical point in that action, the cutter closed the enemy shore and silenced the Spanish battery and briefly dispersed their infantry allowing the harassed boats to reach safety. The following day, she withdrew from the area to return to Key West. She again got underway for the combat zone on 27 May and took up station off Havana on the 28th. For the remainder of the Spanish–American War, Windom participated in the blockade of Havana, returning to Key West on two occasions, once during the last two weeks of June and again during the first week in August.

=== Return to the Revenue Cutter Service ===
The war with Spain ended on 13 August 1898 and Windom reverted to Treasury Department control on the 17th. She returned to Norfolk on 22 August and remained there until 3 October at which time she headed for New York City where she transferred most of her armament to USRC Gresham before resuming duty at Baltimore with the Revenue Cutter Service on October 13. From the fall of 1898 to the summer of 1906, Windom operated out of Baltimore, cruising the waters of the Chesapeake Bay and occasionally venturing out into the Atlantic in the vicinity of the Virginia Capes. On 13 July 1906, the cutter departed Baltimore to sail to her new base of operations at Galveston, Texas. She arrived there on 6 August and began duty patrolling the Gulf Coast of the United States.

On 1 August 1911, she left Galveston to return to Baltimore. She arrived on 1 September and was placed out of commission on the 12th. Her retirement, however, was only a brief one, for she returned to full commission on 1 November. She served at Washington, D.C., from mid-November 1911 until early May 1912. On 7 May, she headed back to the Gulf of Mexico where she assisted in flood relief at New Orleans. In June, Windom resumed her coastal patrols out of Galveston. She cruised the entire Gulf Coast from Texas to Key West over the next 18 months enforcing navigation laws and attending several regattas. After war broke out in Europe in August 1914, the cutter took on the added responsibility of enforcing America's neutrality laws.

In November 1914, Windom headed back to Baltimore to be decommissioned again. She arrived at the Revernue Service Depot on 3 December but made a short voyage to Washington before going out of service. She returned to the depot on 13 January 1915 and on the 15th she was placed out of commission. On 28 January 1915 the Revenue Cutter Service was renamed the United States Coast Guard and the prefix of all cutters were changed from USRC to USCGC. On 13 December 1915, near the end of a year of inactivity, Windom was renamed Comanche. Less than a month later, on 8 January 1916, the cutter went back into service under her new name. On 19 January, she departed the Chesapeake Bay area to return to her patrol area in the Gulf of Mexico. She arrived at Galveston on 2 February and resumed her former patrol routine.

=== World War I ===
The United States' declaration of war on the Central Powers once again brought the cutter under Navy Department control on 6 April 1917. Comanche continued to patrol the Gulf Coast even in naval service. Her second period of service with the Navy lasted over two years until 28 August 1919 at which time she was returned to the jurisdiction of the Treasury Department.

=== Return to the Coast Guard ===
Comanche continued her patrols of the gulf for another seven months and then headed for Key West where she was decommissioned on 17 April 1920 for repairs. Recommissioned in July, the ship relieved cutter Tallapoosa at Mobile and rejoined the Gulf Division. Serving successively at Mobile, Key West, and Galveston, she patrolled coastal waters constantly until June 1930. During that period, she left the Gulf of Mexico only once, in 1923, for repairs at Baltimore and Norfolk. On 2 June 1930, she was detached from the Gulf Division and was ordered back to the Coast Guard Yard at Baltimore.

=== Disposal ===
She arrived at the Coast Guard Yard on 1 July and was placed out of commission on 31 July 1930. She was sold to Weiss Motor Lines, of Baltimore, on 13 November 1930 for US$4,501.

== Notes ==
=== References ===
- "General Order No. 1" (PDF). U.S. Coast Guard Documents & Publications. U.S. Coast Guard Historian's Office.
- "Record of Movements, Vessels of the United States Coast Guard, 1790–December 31, 1933 (1989 reprint)" (PDF). U.S. Coast Guard Historian's Office. Archived from the original (PDF) on October 12, 2020.
- "Windom, 1896 (later Comanche)". www.history.uscg.mil. U.S. Coast Guard Historian's Office.
- Canney, Donald L. (1995). U.S. Coast Guard and Revenue Cutters, 1790–1935. Naval Institute Press, Annapolis, Maryland. ISBN 978-1-55750-101-1.
- Evans, Stephen H. (1949). The United States Coast Guard 1790–1915: A Definitive History. Naval Institute Press, Annapolis, Maryland. No ISBN
- King, Irving H. (1996). The Coast Guard Expands, 1865–1915: New Roles, New Frontiers. Naval Institute Press, Annapolis, Maryland. ISBN 978-1-55750-458-6.
- Larzelere, Alex (2003). The Coast Guard in World War I: An Untold Story. Naval Institute Press, Annapolis, Maryland. ISBN 978-1-55750-476-0.
