= William Alvin Pittenger =

American politician (1885–1951)

William A. Pittenger
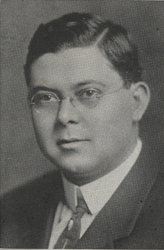

Member of the U.S. House of Representatives from Minnesota's 8th district
- In office March 4, 1929 – March 3, 1933
- In office January 3, 1935 – January 3, 1937
- In office January 3, 1939 – January 3, 1947

Member of the Minnesota House of Representatives
- In office 1917 to 1920

Personal details
- Born: William Alvin Pittenger; December 29, 1885 Crawfordsville, Indiana, U.S.
- Died: November 26, 1951 (aged 65) Duluth, Minnesota, U.S.
- Resting place: Forest Hill Cemetery
- Party: Republican

William Alvin Pittenger (December 29, 1885 – November 26, 1951) was a United States representative from Minnesota's 8th congressional district.

== Biography ==
He was born on a farm near Crawfordsville, Montgomery County, Indiana and attended rural schools. Pittenger graduated from Wabash College, Crawfordsville, Indiana, in 1909, and from Harvard Law School in 1912. He was admitted to the bar in 1912 and opened a law practice in Duluth, Minnesota.

=== State assembly ===
Pittenger served as a member of the Minnesota House of Representatives from 1917 to 1920.

=== Congress ===
He was elected as a Republican to the 71st and 72nd congresses, serving from March 4, 1929, until March 3, 1933. He ran unsuccessfully for reelection in 1932 and resumed his practice of law in Duluth, Minnesota. He was again elected to the 74th congress, in which he served from January 3, 1935, until January 3, 1937, but was defeated in his bid for reelection to the 75th Congress in 1936. He served again in the 76th, 77th, 78th, and 79th Congresses, from January 3, 1939, until January 3, 1947. In 1946 he lost his bid for re-election to the 80th Congress. He made one more attempt in 1950 to reclaim his old House seat, but was defeated 63% to 37%.

=== Retirement and death ===
After his retirement from politics, Pittenger again resumed the practice of law, and died in Duluth, Minnesota, on November 26, 1951. He is buried in Forest Hill Cemetery.

U.S. House of Representatives
Preceded by William Leighton Carss	U.S. Representative from Minnesota's 8th congressional district 1929–1933	Succeeded by General Ticket Adopted
Preceded by General Ticket Abolished	U.S. Representative from Minnesota's 8th congressional district 1935–1937	Succeeded by John Bernard
Preceded by John Bernard	U.S. Representative from Minnesota's 8th congressional district 1939–1947	Succeeded by John Blatnik
