= James Manahan =

American politician

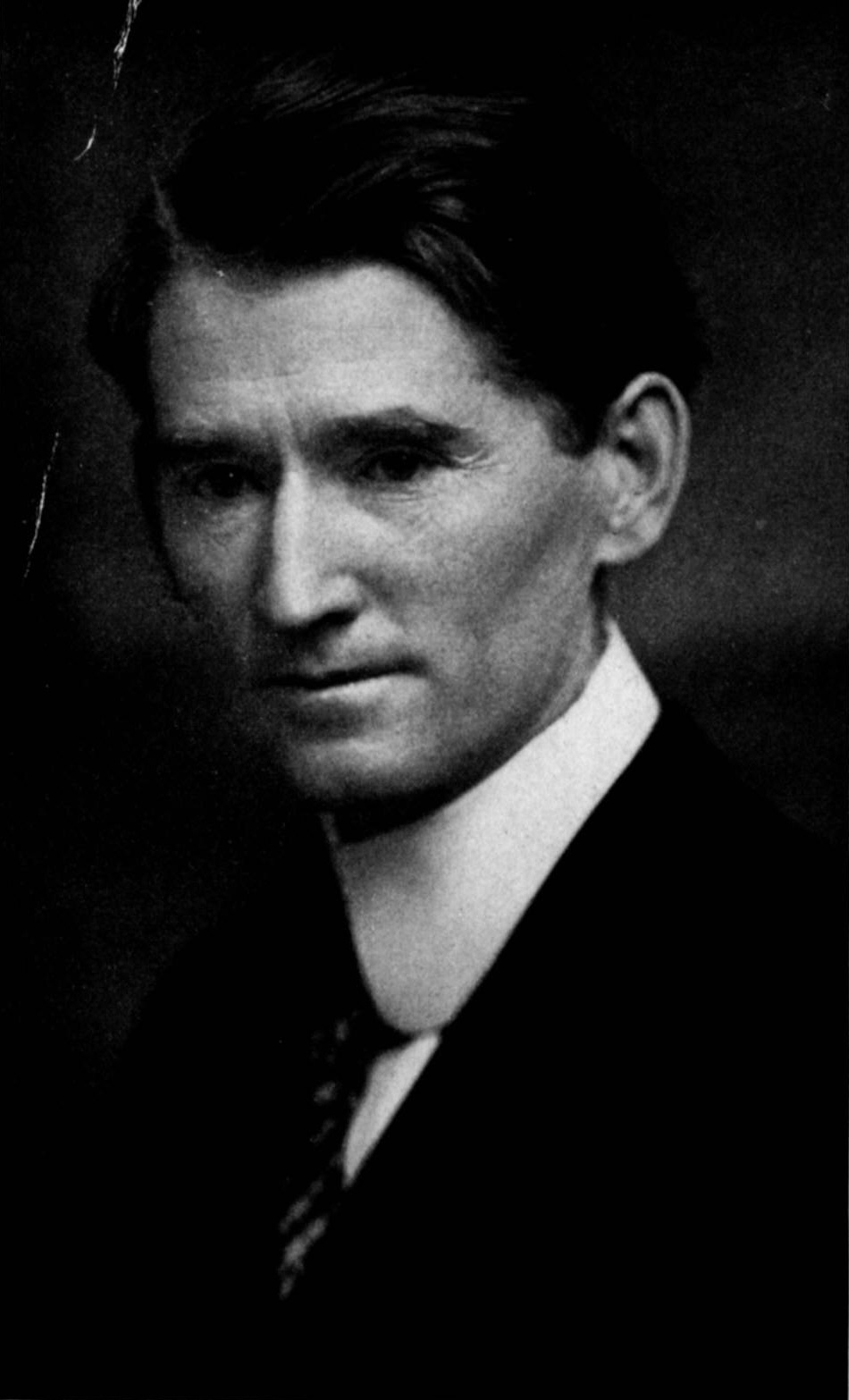
- Manahan in 1914. Frontispiece of his 1933 autobiography, Trials of a Lawyer

Member of the U.S. House of Representatives from Minnesota's at-large district
- In office March 4, 1913 – March 3, 1915
- Preceded by: District created
- Succeeded by: District abolished

Personal details
- Born: March 12, 1866 Fillmore County, Minnesota, U.S.
- Died: January 8, 1932 (aged 65) Saint Paul, Minnesota, U.S.
- Party: Republican
- Education: University of Minnesota Law School
- Profession: Attorney

James Manahan (March 12, 1866 – January 8, 1932) was a U.S. representative from Minnesota.

Manahan was born near Chatfield in Fillmore County, Minnesota, to Irish immigrant parents. He graduated from the Normal School of Winona, Minnesota, in 1886. For two years, he worked as a school teacher in Graceville. He later attended the University of Wisconsin Law School, and eventually earned his law degree from the University of Minnesota Law School in 1889. Having been admitted to the bar the same year, he began practicing law in St. Paul, later relocating his practice to Lincoln, Nebraska, in 1895. He moved back to Minneapolis in 1905, and practiced law there until 1912, when he was elected as a Republican to the Sixty-third Congress (March 4, 1913 – March 3, 1915). He declined to be a candidate for renomination in 1914, and resumed his law practice. He became involved with the Nonpartisan League and served as a legal advisor. He died in St. Paul in 1932.

U.S. House of Representatives
Preceded by District created	U.S. Representative elected at-large to represent the whole state 1913 – 1915	Succeeded by District eliminated
