= Daniel Sheldon Norton =

American politician

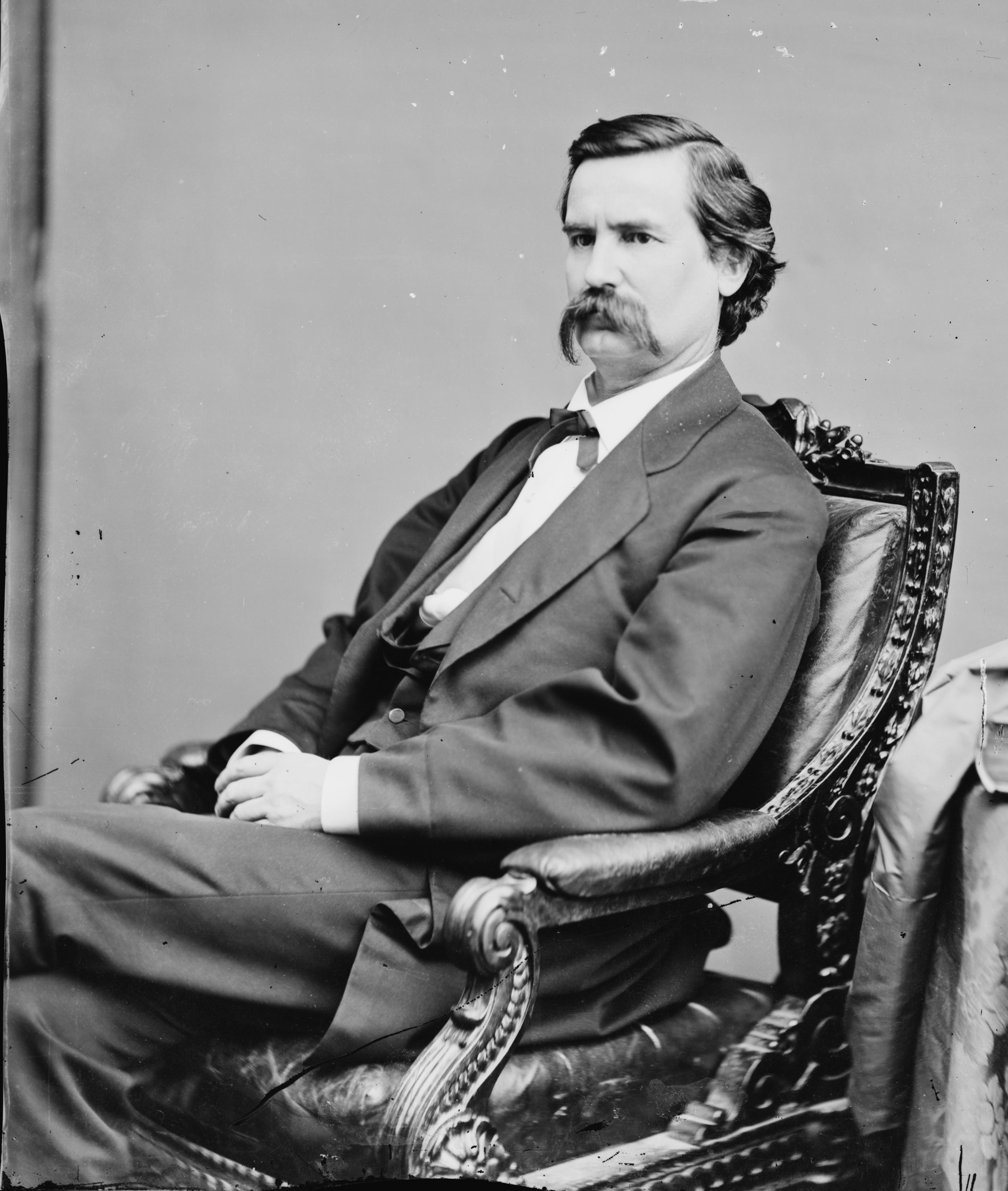

United States Senator from Minnesota
- In office March 4, 1865 – July 14, 1870
- Governor: Horace Austin
- Preceded by: Morton S. Wilkinson
- Succeeded by: William Windom

Minnesota State Senator from the 11th district
- In office January 5, 1864 – January 1, 1866
- In office January 8, 1861 – January 6, 1862
- In office December 2, 1857 – December 6, 1859

Personal details
- Born: April 12, 1829 Mount Vernon, Ohio, U.S.
- Died: July 14, 1870 (aged 41) Washington, D.C., U.S.
- Resting place: Green Mount Cemetery
- Party: Unionist, Republican
- Profession: Lawyer

Daniel Sheldon Norton (April 12, 1829 – July 14, 1870) was an American lawyer and politician who served in the Minnesota State Senate and as a U.S. senator from Minnesota.

== Life and career ==
Norton was born in Mount Vernon, Ohio to Daniel Sheldon and Sarah Sheldon (née Banning). He had a brother, Anthony Banning Norton, who also became a politician. He attended Kenyon College but left school to serve with the 2nd Ohio Volunteers in the Mexican–American War. After returning from the war he studied law under his brother-in-law Judge Rollin C. Hurd. For several years he moved to California and Nicaragua but he returned to Ohio in 1852 and was admitted to the bar shortly thereafter. He practiced law in Mount Vernon for several years before he moving to Minnesota Territory in 1855.

After initially living in St. Paul, Minnesota, Norton eventually settled in Winona, Minnesota. In 1857 Norton was elected to the Minnesota State Senate for its first legislative session. He was reelected in 1860 and 1863 serving four total terms in seven years. In 1865 the state legislature elected him to the US Senate where he served in the 39th and 40th congresses. Initially elected as a Unionist, Norton later aligned himself with the more moderate Republican faction in the senate. He supported President Andrew Johnson's stance on reconstruction and opposed his impeachment. This led to tension with the more radical Republicans of Minnesota who passed a resolution censuring Norton for his actions and calling for his resignation. Unlike most Republicans, he opposed the Fourteenth and Fifteenth Amendments to the United States Constitution.

Norton died while in office on July 14, 1870, having suffered for several weeks from tuberculosis. He was buried in Green Mount Cemetery.

== See also ==
- List of members of the United States Congress who died in office (1790–1899)

U.S. Senate
Preceded by Morton S. Wilkinson	U.S. senator (Class 2) from Minnesota; 1865–1870; Served alongside: Alexander Ramsey	Succeeded by William Windom
