= James McCleary (politician) =

American politician

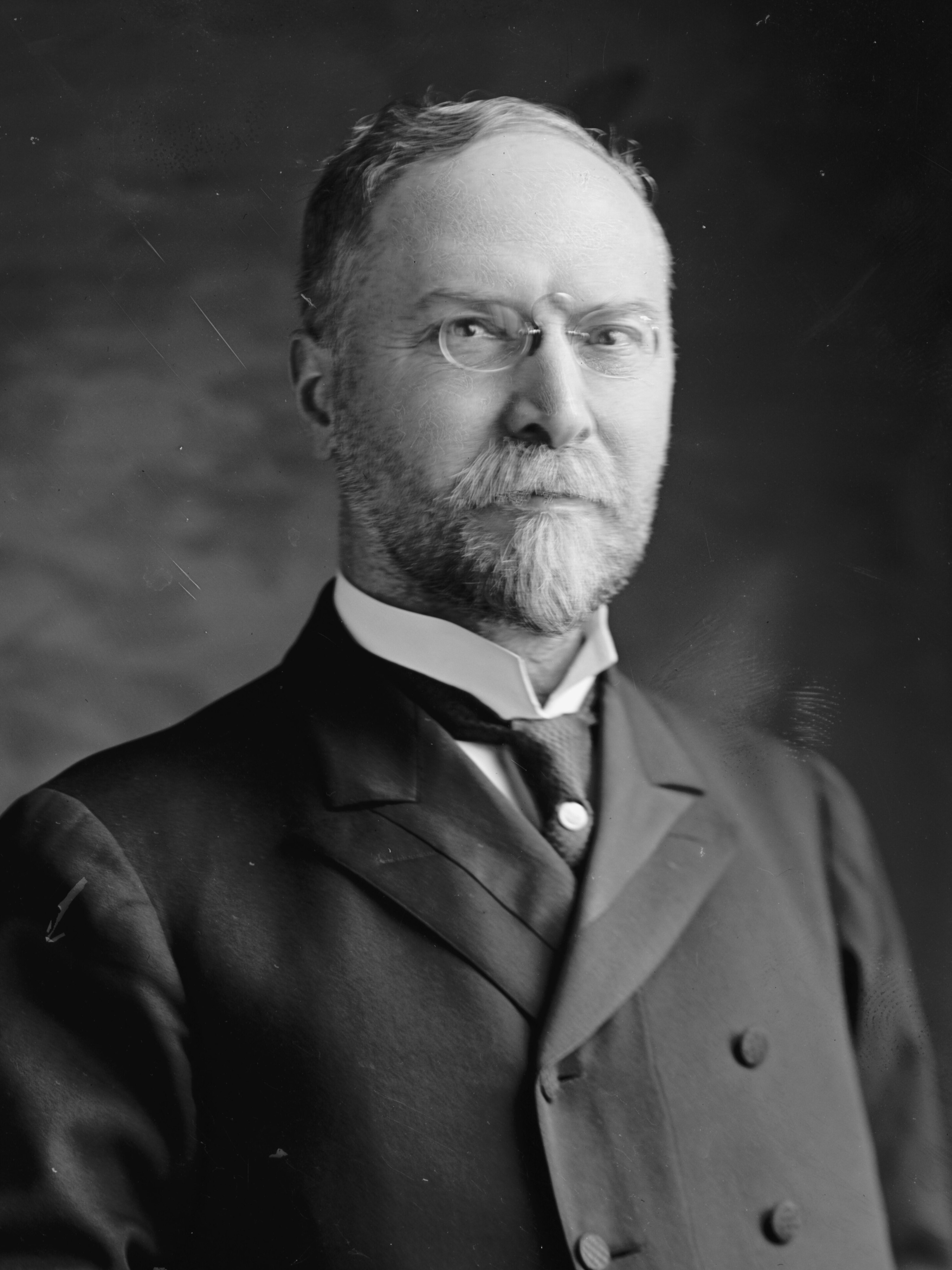

Member of the U.S. House of Representatives from Minnesota's 2nd district
- In office March 4, 1893 – March 3, 1907
- Preceded by: John Lind
- Succeeded by: Winfield Scott Hammond

Personal details
- Born: February 5, 1853 Ingersoll, Ontario, Canada
- Died: December 17, 1924 (aged 71)
- Party: Republican

James Thompson McCleary (February 5, 1853 – December 17, 1924) was an American politician who served as a United States representative from Minnesota. Born in Ingersoll, Ontario, Canada, he was educated at Ingersoll High School and McGill University (Montreal). He engaged as superintendent of the Pierce County, Wisconsin schools until 1881 when he resigned and moved to Minnesota and became State Institute conductor of Minnesota and professor in the normal school in Mankato, Minnesota. He was president of the Minnesota Educational Association in 1891.

McCleary was elected as a Republican to the 53rd, 54th, 55th, 56th, 57th, 58th, and 59th congresses, holding office from March 4, 1893, to March 3, 1907.

He was defeated for reelection in 1906 to the Sixtieth congress and was appointed Second Assistant Postmaster General during Theodore Roosevelt’s administration, holding that office from March 29, 1907, until his resignation on September 15, 1908.

He was secretary of the American Iron and Steel Institute in New York City from 1911 to 1920; he and moved to Maiden Rock, Pierce County, Wisconsin, and engaged in farming and thence to Mill Valley, California, and engaged in literary pursuits.

He returned to Maiden Rock in 1924 and that year died in La Crosse. Interment was in Lakewood Cemetery, Maiden Rock.

U.S. House of Representatives
Preceded by John Lind	U.S. Representative from Minnesota's 2nd congressional district 1893 – 1907	Succeeded by Winfield Scott Hammond
