= William Windom (politician) =

American politician (1827–1891)

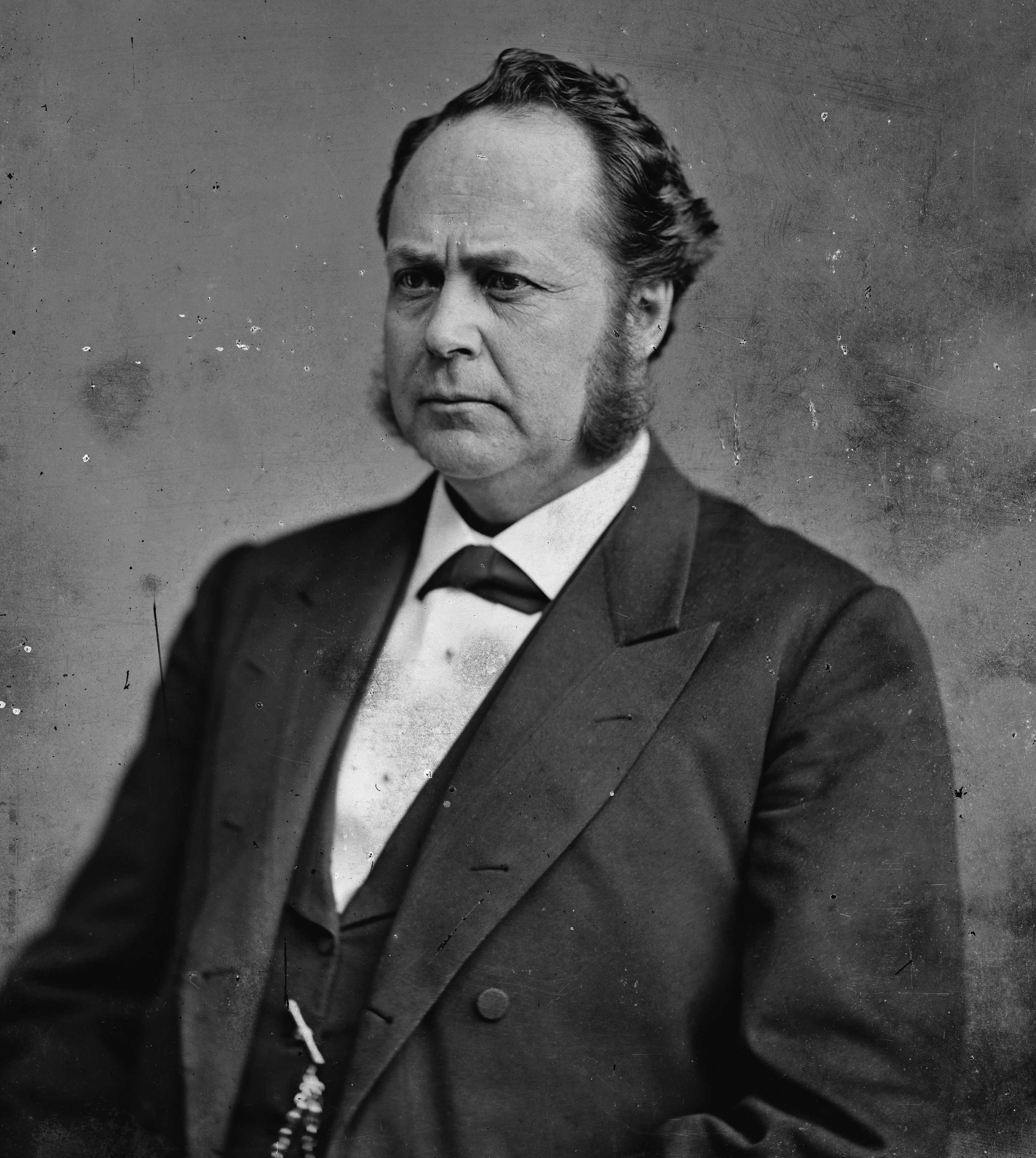
- Windom c. 1870–80

33rd and 39th United States Secretary of the Treasury
- In office March 7, 1889 – January 29, 1891
- President: Benjamin Harrison
- Preceded by: Charles S. Fairchild
- Succeeded by: Charles Foster
- In office March 8, 1881 – November 13, 1881
- President: James A. Garfield; Chester A. Arthur
- Preceded by: John Sherman
- Succeeded by: Charles J. Folger

United States Senator from Minnesota
- In office November 15, 1881 – March 3, 1883
- Preceded by: Alonzo J. Edgerton
- Succeeded by: Dwight M. Sabin
- In office March 4, 1871 – March 7, 1881
- Preceded by: Ozora P. Stearns
- Succeeded by: Alonzo J. Edgerton
- In office July 15, 1870 – January 22, 1871
- Appointed by: Horace Austin
- Preceded by: Daniel Norton
- Succeeded by: Ozora P. Stearns

Member of the U.S. House of Representatives from Minnesota
- In office March 4, 1859 – March 3, 1869
- Preceded by: James M. Cavanaugh
- Succeeded by: Morton S. Wilkinson
- Constituency: At-large (1859–63); 1st district (1863–69)

Personal details
- Born: May 10, 1827 Belmont County, Ohio, U.S.
- Died: January 29, 1891 (aged 63) New York City, New York, U.S.
- Resting place: Rock Creek Cemetery
- Party: Republican

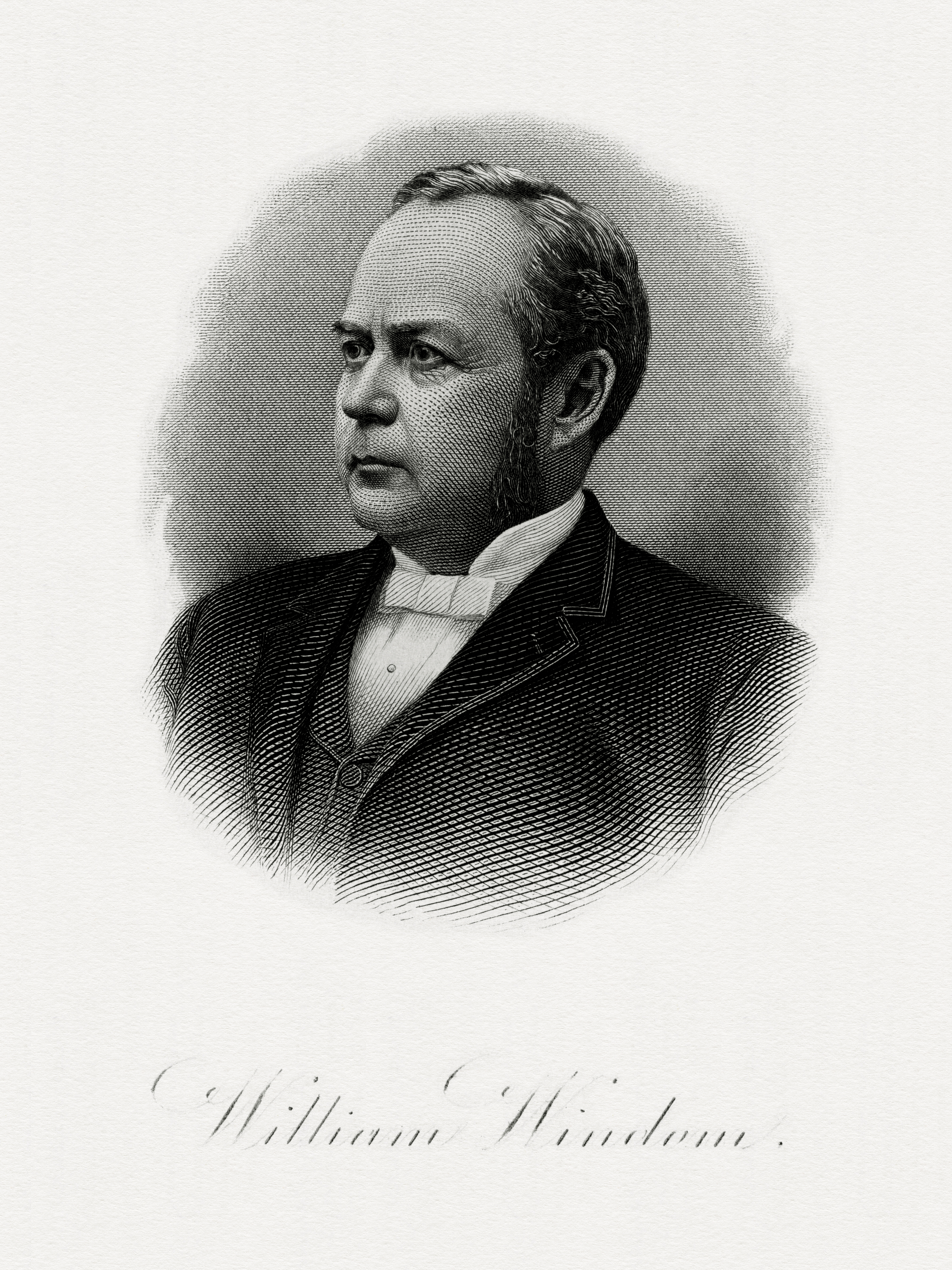
Bureau of Engraving and Printing portrait of Windom as Secretary of the Treasury

William Windom (May 10, 1827 – January 29, 1891) was an American politician from Minnesota. He served as U.S. Representative from 1859 to 1869, and as U.S. Senator from 1870 to January 1871, from March 1871 to March 1881, and from November 1881 to 1883. He also served two non-consecutive times as Secretary of the Treasury from March to November 1881, and from 1889 to 1891, under three Presidents. He was a Republican. He was the great-grandfather of actor William Windom, who was named for him.

== Early life ==
Windom was born in Belmont County, Ohio. He moved to Minnesota Territory in 1855 and settled in the town of Winona on the banks of the Mississippi River in southeastern Minnesota.

== Political career ==
Windom was elected U.S. Representative in 1859, filling one of Minnesota's two at-large seats. He was re-elected in 1861, again at-large. By 1862, Minnesota had established Congressional districts, and in that year he was re-elected from Minnesota's 1st congressional district; and also in 1864 and 1866. He was not a candidate in 1868.

Senator Daniel S. Norton died on July 14, 1870. On July 15, Governor Horace Austin appointed Windom to the resulting vacancy, to serve until the legislature elected a replacement. When the legislature met in January 1871, they elected Ozora P. Stearns to serve the last 41 days of the current term (January 22 – March 3), and elected Windom to serve the next full term, beginning March 4. Windom was re-elected in 1877, and served until March 7, 1881, when he resigned to become Secretary of the Treasury.

In the United States Senate, Windom was recognized as a strong advocate of railroad regulation. Indeed, in December 1872, he became the chairman of the Senate Select Committee on Transportation Routes to the Seaboard to investigate transportation practices. The select committee's report was submitted to the Senate on April 24, 1874, and was ordered to be printed the same day. The analytical report, among other conclusions and recommendations, recommended a Bureau of Commerce; it would have all the basic elements of the Interstate Commerce Commission, as created thirteen years later, in January 1887, and other follow-on. Almost 35 years later the Progressive Era Inland Waterways Commission, looking into similar issues and many new ones, would recognize the "Report of the Windom Select Committee" as the third epoch in the movement toward developing the inland waterways of the country.

In 1880, Windom sought the Republican nomination for President. But at the Republican National Convention, he received only 10 votes on the first ballot. The convention deadlocked, and after over 30 ballots began to consider choosing a "dark horse" candidate, such as Windom. But instead of Windom, they nominated James A. Garfield, who was subsequently elected president.

On March 7, 1881, Windom resigned from the Senate and was appointed Secretary of the Treasury by Garfield, taking office the next day.

Windom served as Treasury Secretary until November 13, when he resigned. On October 26, he was again elected Senator by the Minnesota Legislature, this time to fill the vacancy left by his own resignation. He re-assumed his Senate seat on November 15 and served until the end of his term on March 3, 1883. He sought re-election in 1882, but was defeated.

In 1883, he moved to New York City, where he practiced law until 1889. After President Benjamin Harrison was elected in 1888, he appointed Windom as Secretary of the Treasury. Taking office on March 8, 1889, Windom served as Treasury Secretary until his death on January 29, 1891. He died while giving a speech in the famous Delmonico's Steak House in New York City.

== Memorials ==
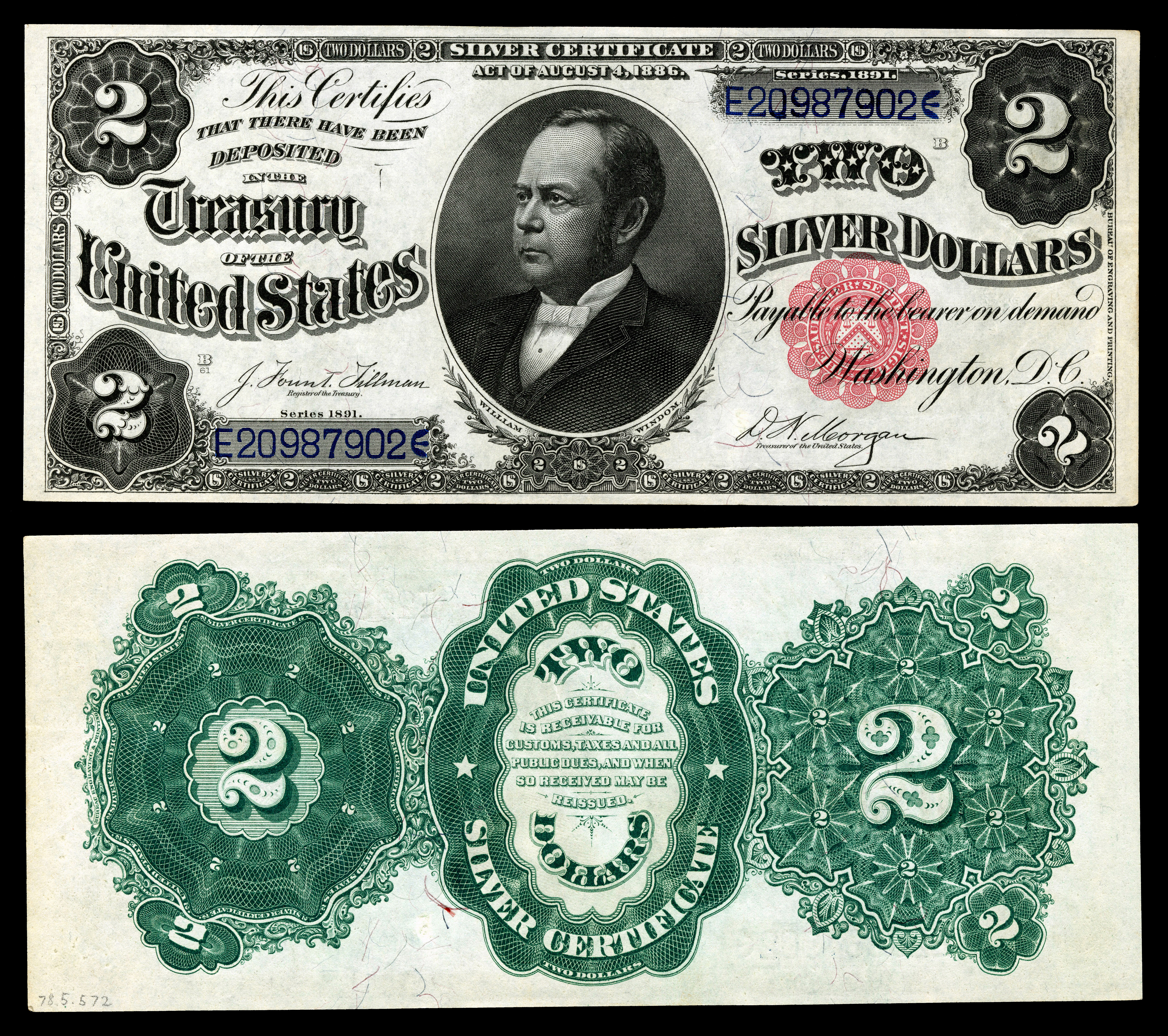
Windom appears on U.S. silver certificates

Windom's engraved portrait appeared on the $2.00 denomination of U.S. silver certificates from 1891 to 1896. The revenue cutter USS Windom was named for him, as was a World War II Liberty Ship.

The city of Windom in Cottonwood County, Minnesota is named for him.

Windom College in Montevideo, Minnesota is named for him.

Windom Park in Winona, Minnesota is named after him, as are Windom Northeast Park and Windom South Park in Minneapolis.

The Windom and Windom Park neighborhoods in Minneapolis are named after him.

William Windom is the namesake of Windom Peak, in Colorado.

U.S. House of Representatives
| Preceded by William Wallace Phelps and James M. Cavanaugh | Member of the U.S. House of Representatives from Minnesota's at-large congressional district March 3, 1859 – March 3, 1863; Served alongside: Cyrus Aldrich | Succeeded by District eliminated |
| Preceded by New district | Member of the U.S. House of Representatives from Minnesota's 1st congressional district March 3, 1863 – March 3, 1869 | Succeeded by Morton S. Wilkinson |
U.S. Senate
| Preceded by Daniel Norton | U.S. Senator (Class 2) from Minnesota; July 15, 1870 – January 22, 1871; Served alongside: Alexander Ramsey | Succeeded by Ozora P. Stearns |
| Preceded by Ozora P. Stearns | U.S. Senator (Class 2) from Minnesota; March 4, 1871 – March 7, 1881; Served alongside: Alexander Ramsey, Samuel J. R. McMillan | Succeeded by Alonzo J. Edgerton |
| Preceded by Lot M. Morrill | Chair of the Senate Appropriations Committee; 1876–1879 | Succeeded by Henry Davis |
Political offices
| Preceded by John Sherman | U.S. Secretary of the Treasury; 1881 | Succeeded by Charles J. Folger |
U.S. Senate
| Preceded by Alonzo J. Edgerton | U.S. Senator (Class 2) from Minnesota; November 15, 1881 – March 3, 1883; Served alongside: Samuel J. R. McMillan | Succeeded by Dwight M. Sabin |
| Preceded by George F. Edmunds | Chair of the Senate Foreign Relations Committee; 1881–1883 | Succeeded by John Miller |
Political offices
| Preceded by Charles S. Fairchild | U.S. Secretary of the Treasury; 1889–1891 | Succeeded by Charles Foster |
