= James M. Cavanaugh =

American lawyer and politician (1823–1879)

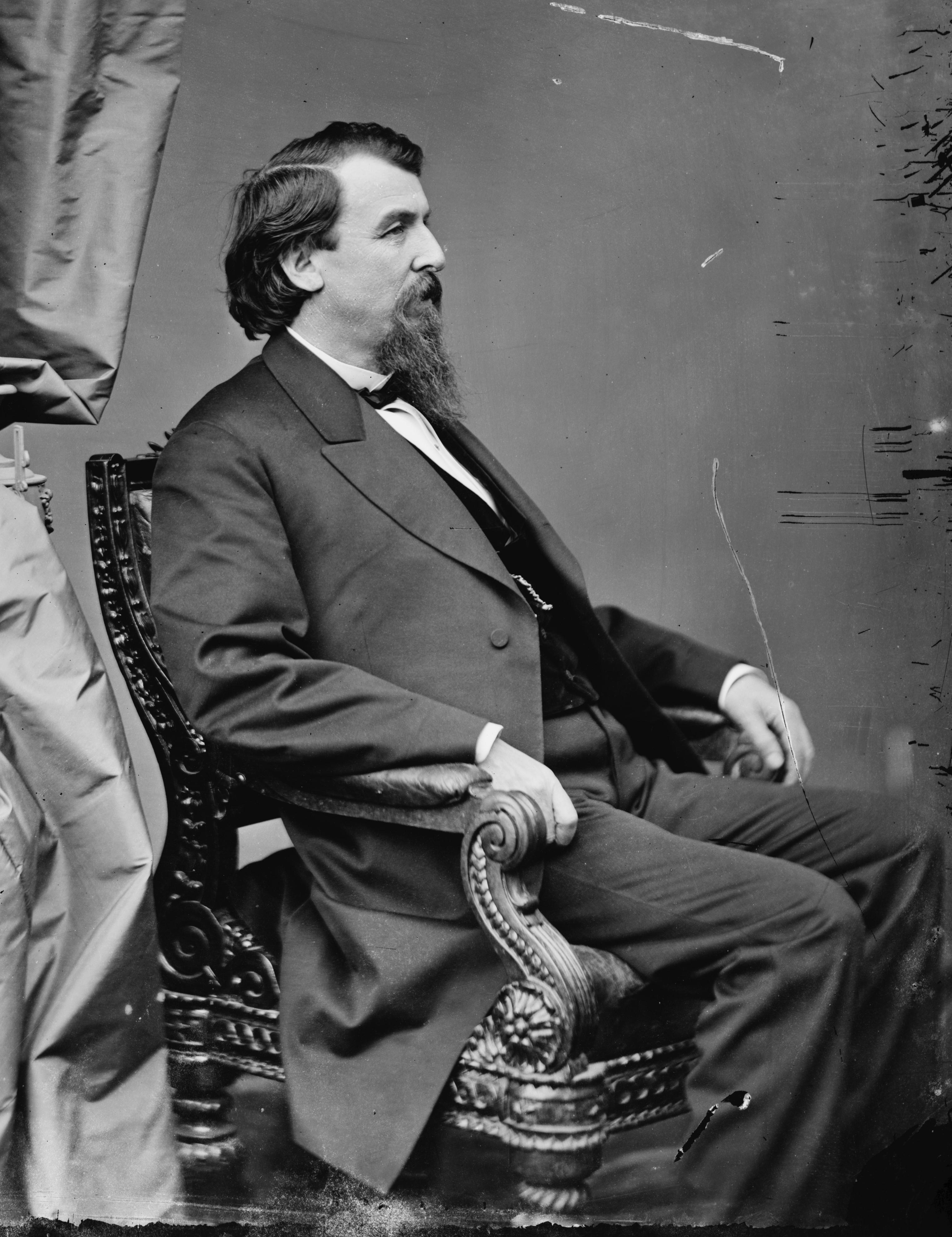
- Portrait of Cavanaugh, by Mathew Brady and Levin Corbin Handy

Member of the U.S. House of Representatives from Minnesota's at-large district
- In office May 11, 1858 – March 3, 1859 Serving with William Wallace Phelps
- Preceded by: Position established
- Succeeded by: William Windom

Member of the U.S. House of Representatives from Montana Territory's at-large district
- In office March 4, 1867 – March 3, 1871
- Preceded by: Samuel McLean
- Succeeded by: William H. Clagett

Personal details
- Born: James Michael Cavanaugh; July 4, 1823 Springfield, Massachusetts, US
- Died: October 30, 1879 (aged 56) Leadville, Colorado, US
- Resting place: Green-Wood Cemetery, Brooklyn, New York City
- Party: Democratic
- Occupation: Lawyer, politician

James Michael Cavanaugh (July 4, 1823 – October 30, 1879) was an American lawyer and politician. A Democrat, he served in the United States House of Representatives from Minnesota and a delegate from the Territory of Montana.

== Biography ==
Cavanaugh was born on July 4, 1823, in Springfield, Massachusetts. Educated at local schools, he worked for newspapers. He later studied law, and was admitted to the bar in 1854, beginning his practice in Davenport, Iowa. In 1854 or spring 1856, he moved to Chatfield, Minnesota, and continued the practice of law. In 1856, he was chosen to manage a land grant in Chatfield.

A Democrat, Cavanaugh and William Wallace Phelps were elected to the United States House of Representatives from its at-large district, as part of the first legislature following Minnesota's admittance as a state. On May 28, 1868, he stated within the House of Representatives "I like an Indian better dead than living. I have never in my life seen a good Indian – and I have seen thousands – except when I have seen a dead Indian"; similar statements were also ascribed to American Indian Wars officer Philip Sheridan, which he denied making. Cavanaugh was known for his speaking ability. He served from May 11, 1858, to March 3, 1859. He lost his re-election in 1858.

In 1861, Cavanaugh moved to the Colorado Territory, and continued practicing law, as well as mining. He was a member of the Colorado Constitutional Convention of 1865. In 1865, he moved to the Montana Territory, again serving in the House of Representatives, from its at-large district. He served from March 4, 1867, to March 3, 1871, having lost his re-election in 1870. He later moved to New York City and practiced law, returning to Colorado in 1879. He settled in Leadville, where he died on October 30, 1879. He was buried in Green-Wood Cemetery, in Brooklyn.

== Notes ==
U.S. House of Representatives
Preceded by New state	Member of the U.S. House of Representatives from Minnesota's at-large congressional district May 11, 1858 – March 3, 1859; Served alongside: William Wallace Phelps	Succeeded by Cyrus Aldrich and William Windom
Preceded by Samuel McLean	Delegate to the U.S. House of Representatives from Montana Territory; March 4, 1867 – March 3, 1871	Succeeded by William H. Clagett
