= William Wallace Phelps =

American politician (1826–1873)

- From 1859's McClees' Gallery of Photographic Portraits of the Senators, Representatives & Delegates of the Thirty-Fifth Congress

Member of the U.S. House of Representatives from Minnesota's at-large district
- In office May 11, 1858 – March 3, 1859 Serving with James M. Cavanaugh
- Preceded by: District created
- Succeeded by: Cyrus Aldrich; William Windom

Personal details
- Born: June 1, 1826 Oakland County, Michigan Territory, U.S.
- Died: August 3, 1873 (aged 47) Spring Lake, Michigan, U.S.
- Resting place: Oakwood Cemetery, Red Wing, Minnesota, U.S.
- Party: Democratic
- Education: University of Michigan
- Profession: Politician, lawyer

Military service
- Allegiance: United States of America
- Branch/service: Union Army
- Years of service: 1862–1863
- Rank: Captain
- Unit: Company D, 10th Minnesota Infantry Regiment
- Battles/wars: American Civil War; Dakota War of 1862

William Wallace Phelps (June 1, 1826 – August 3, 1873) was a United States congressman from Minnesota. He was born in Oakland County, Michigan Territory on June 1, 1826. He attended the country schools and graduated from the University of Michigan at Ann Arbor in 1846, where he was a founding member of the Chi Psi fraternity. He studied law and was admitted to the bar in 1848 and began a practice. (Register of the United States land office at Red Wing, Goodhue County, Minnesota).

Upon the admission of Minnesota as a state into the Union, he was elected as a Democrat to the 35th congress, and served from May 11, 1858, to March 3, 1859. After leaving congress, he resumed his practice in Red Wing. Phelps died in Spring Lake, Ottawa County, Michigan, on August 3, 1873. He was buried in Oakwood Cemetery, Red Wing.

U.S. House of Representatives
Preceded by New state	Member of the U.S. House of Representatives from Minnesota's at-large congressional district May 11, 1858 – March 3, 1859; Served alongside: James M. Cavanaugh	Succeeded by Cyrus Aldrich and William Windom
