= Cyrus Aldrich =

American politician (1808–1871)

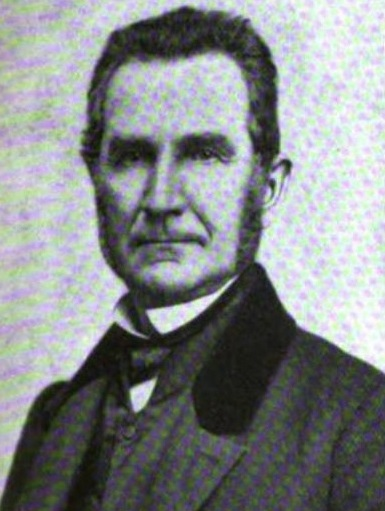
- Aldrich in an 1899 publication

Personal details
- Born: June 18, 1808 Smithfield, Rhode Island, U.S.
- Died: October 5, 1871 (aged 63) Minneapolis, Minnesota, U.S.
- Resting place: Lakewood Cemetery
- Party: Republican
- Spouse: Clara A. Heaton (m. 1845)
- Children: 4

Cyrus Aldrich (June 18, 1808 – October 5, 1871) was an American politician who served as a U.S. representative from Minnesota.

== Early life ==
Cyrus Aldrich was born on June 18, 1808, in Smithfield, Rhode Island. He attended common schools.

== Career ==
Aldrich worked as a sailor, boatman, farmer, contractor on public works, and mail contractor, before moving to Illinois and settling in Alton in 1837. In Alton, he was member of the Illinois House of Representatives from 1845 to 1847. He served as register of deeds of Jo Daviess County from 1847 to 1849.

Aldrich moved to Minneapolis, Minnesota, in 1855 and engaged in the lumber business, and was elected as a Republican to the Thirty-sixth and Thirty-seventh congresses (March 4, 1859 – March 3, 1863) where he was chairman of the Committee on Indian Affairs (Thirty-seventh Congress). Aldrich was not a candidate for renomination in 1862; unsuccessful candidate for election in 1863 to the United States Senate. He became a member of the Minnesota House of Representatives in 1865 and he was elected chairman of the board of supervisors of the town of Minneapolis in 1865. He was appointed by President Abraham Lincoln in 1863 as one of the commissioners to examine claims for indemnity of those who had suffered from the Dakota War of 1862. He was postmaster of Minneapolis from September 11, 1867, to April 15, 1871, when a successor was appointed.

== Personal life ==
Aldrich married Clara A. Heaton in 1845. The best man was Elihu B. Washburne. They had three daughters and one son, Henry C.

Aldrich died on October 5, 1871, in Minneapolis. He was buried in Lakewood Cemetery.

== Legacy ==
Aldrich is the namesake of the city of Aldrich, Minnesota.

U.S. House of Representatives
Preceded by William Wallace Phelps and James M. Cavanaugh	Member of the U.S. House of Representatives from Minnesota's at-large congressional district March 3, 1859 – March 3, 1863; Served alongside: William Windom	Succeeded by District eliminated
