= Minnesota's at-large congressional district =

Former US congressional district

- Obsolete district
- Created: 1857; 1910; 1930
- Eliminated: 1863; 1935
- Years active: 1857–1863; 1913–1915; 1933–1935

During the 35th through 37th Congresses, Minnesota elected its two members of the United States House of Representatives at-large statewide on a general ticket. Minnesota then elected a member (considered the 10th seat) to an at-large seat 1913–1915, with the remaining nine representatives elected in districts. Minnesota elected all its members at large for the 73rd Congress, ending the practice two years later.

== List of members representing the district ==
=== 1858–1863: two seats ===
Cong ress	Seat A			Seat B		
Cong ress	Member	Party	Electoral history	Member	Party	Electoral history
35th (May 11, 1858 – 1859)	James M. Cavanaugh (Chatfield)	Democratic	Elected in 1857. Lost re-election.	William Wallace Phelps (Red Wing)	Democratic	Elected in 1857. Retired.
36th (1859 – 1861)	William Windom (Winona)	Republican	Elected in 1859. Re-elected in 1860. Redistricted to the 1st district.	Cyrus Aldrich (Minneapolis)	Republican	Elected in 1859. Re-elected in 1860. Retired to run for U.S. senator.
37th (1861 – 1863)	William Windom (Winona)	Republican	Elected in 1859. Re-elected in 1860. Redistricted to the 1st district.	Cyrus Aldrich (Minneapolis)	Republican	Elected in 1859. Re-elected in 1860. Retired to run for U.S. senator.

=== 1913–1915: one seat ===
Elected statewide as the 10th representative

Cong ress	Member	Party	Electoral history
63rd (1913 – 1915)	James Manahan (Minneapolis)	Republican	Elected in 1912. Retired.

=== 1933–1935: nine seats ===
Elected statewide at-large.

Years	Cong ress	Seat one			Seat two			Seat three			Seat four			Seat five			Seat six			Seat seven			Seat eight			Seat nine		
Years	Cong ress	Member	Party	Electoral history	Member	Party	Electoral history	Member	Party	Electoral history	Member	Party	Electoral history	Member	Party	Electoral history	Member	Party	Electoral history	Member	Party	Electoral history	Member	Party	Electoral history	Member	Party	Electoral history
March 4, 1933 – January 3, 1935	73rd	Henry M. Arens (Jordan)	Farmer–Labor	Elected in 1932. Redistricted to the 2nd district and lost re-election.	Ray P. Chase (Anoka)	Republican	Elected in 1932. Redistricted to the 5th district and lost renomination.	Theodore Christianson (Minneapolis)	Republican	Elected in 1932. Redistricted to the 5th district.	Einar Hoidale (Minneapolis)	Democratic	Elected in 1932. Retired to run for U.S. senator.	Magnus Johnson (Kimball)	Farmer–Labor	Elected in 1932. Redistricted to the 6th district and lost re-election.	Harold Knutson (St. Cloud)	Republican	Elected in 1932. Redistricted to the 6th district.	Paul John Kvale (Benson)	Farmer–Labor	Elected in 1932. Redistricted to the 7th district.	Ernest Lundeen (Minneapolis)	Farmer–Labor	Elected in 1932. Redistricted to the 3rd district.	Francis Shoemaker (Red Wing)	Farmer–Labor	Elected in 1932. Redistricted to the 8th district and lost re-election as an Independent.
