= List of breweries in Minnesota =

Breweries in Minnesota produce a wide range of beers in different styles that are marketed locally, regionally, and nationally in the United States. Brewing companies vary widely in the volume and variety of beer produced, from small nanobreweries and microbreweries to massive multinational conglomerate macrobreweries.

In 2014, Minnesota's 109 brewing establishments (including breweries, brewpubs, importers, and company-owned packagers and wholesalers) employed 667 people directly, and more than 24,000 others in related jobs such as wholesaling and retailing. As of 2020, the number of craft breweries had grown to 217, and the craft brewing overall economic impact of $2.2 billion ranked 12th among U.S. states.

Including people directly employed in brewing, as well as those who supply Minnesota's breweries with everything from ingredients to machinery, the total business and personal tax revenue generated by Minnesota's breweries and related industries was more than $480 million. Consumer purchases of Minnesota's brewery products generated more than $177 million extra in tax revenue. In 2020, Minnesota ranked 13th among U.S. states in the number of craft breweries per capita, with 5.2 breweries per 100,000 adults.

== Breweries ==
To be included in this list, a brewery must be located in the U.S. state of Minnesota; it may produce their own beer, produce contract beers, or both. Breweries which are known to produce contract beer are noted, but this specification does not exclude non-contract brewing, nor does a lack of this specification exclude contract brewing.

Brewery	Location	Opened	Notes
10K Brewing	Anoka	2015	
14 Lakes Brewery	Crosslake	2017	
56 Brewing	Minneapolis	2015	
Aegir Brewing Company	Elk River	2018	
Alloy Brewing Company	Coon Rapids	2017	Closed July 2025
Angry Hog Brewery	Austin	2018	
Angry Inch Brewing	Lakeville	2016	
August Schell Brewing Company	New Ulm	1860	The second-oldest family-owned brewery in the U.S.
Back Channel Brewing Collective	Spring Park	2017	
Bad Habit Brewing Company	St. Joseph	2015	Expanded into the former St. Joseph city hall, 2019
Bad Weather Brewing	Saint Paul	2013	
Badger Hill Brewery	Shakopee	2014	
Bald Man Brewing	Eagan	2016	
Bank Brewing Company	Hendricks	2014	
Barrel Theory Beer Company	Saint Paul	2017	
Bauhaus Brew Labs	Minneapolis	2014	
Beaver Island Brewing Company	St. Cloud	2015	
Bemidji Brewing	Bemidji	2013	
Bent Paddle Brewing Company	Duluth	2013	
Big Wood Brewery	White Bear Lake	2009	Established in Vadnais Heights, MN in 2009, Taproom opened and Brewery relocated to Downtown White Bear Lake, MN in February 2014.
Birch's on the Lake Brewhouse	Long Lake	2015	
Black Stack Brewing	Saint Paul	2017	
Blacklist Artisan Ales	Duluth	2016	
Blue Wolf Brewing Company	Brooklyn Park	2018	
Boom Island Brewing Company	Minnetonka	2011	
Brau Bros. Brewing Company	Marshall	2006	
Broken Clock Brewing	Minneapolis	2017	
Brühaven Craft Company	Minneapolis	2024	Located in the former Lakes & Legends Brewing Company space in Loring Park, Minneapolis.
Burning Brothers	Saint Paul	2014	Gluten-free beer and gluten-free facility. Closed May 10, 2025.
Castle Danger Brewery	Two Harbors	2014	
Canal Park Brewing	Duluth	2011	
Chapel Brewing	Dundas	2017	
Copper Trail Brewing Company	Alexandria	2016	
Cuyuna Brewing Company	Crosby	2017	
Dangerous Man Brewing Company	Maple Lake	2013	Formerly located in Minneapolis.
Day Block Brewing Company	Minneapolis	2014	
Dual Citizen Brewing Company	St. Paul	2018	
Eastlake Craft Brewery	Minneapolis	2014	
ENKI Brewing Company	Victoria	2013	
Fair State Brewing Cooperative	Minneapolis	2014	
Fat Pants Brewing Company	Eden Prairie	2019	
Finnegans Brew Company	Minneapolis	2018	
Fitger's Brewing Company	Duluth	1997	
Forager Brewing Company	Rochester	2015	
Forbidden Barrel Brewing Company	Worthington	2019	
Forgotten Star Brewing Company	Fridley	2019	
Foxhole Brewhouse	Willmar	2015	
The Freehouse	Minneapolis	2014	
Fulton Beer	Minneapolis	2009	
Gambit Brewing Company	St. Paul	2023	
Giesenbrau Bier Company	New Prague	2017	
Grand Rounds Brewing Company	Rochester	2015	
Gravity Storm Brewery Cooperative	Austin	2018	
HammerHeart Brewing Company	Ely	2013	Located in Lino Lakes until brewery closed in 2022. Production resumed in 2024 in Ely.
Hayes Public House	Buffalo	2013	
Hoops Brewing	Duluth	2017	
Invictus Brewing Company	Blaine	2018	
Imminent Brewing	Northfield	2017	
Inbound BrewCo	Minneapolis	2016	
Indeed Brewing Company	Minneapolis	2012	
Insight Brewing	Minneapolis	2014	
Jack Pine Brewery	Baxter	2012	
Kinney Creek Brewery	Rochester	2012	
Lake Superior Brewing Company	Duluth	1994	Closed in 2019, but re-opened under new ownership in 2022.
Lakeville Brewing Company	Lakeville	2016	
Lift Bridge Brewing Company	Stillwater	2008	
LocAle Brewing Company	Mankato	2018	
Loony's Brew	Ranier	2017	
Lost Sanity Brewing	Madelia	2018	
LTS Brewing Company	Rochester	2015	
Lupulin Brewing	Big Lake	2015	
LynLake Brewery	Minneapolis	2014	Housed in the former Lyndale Theater
Mankato Brewery	Mankato	2012	
Mineral Springs Brewery	Owatonna	2019	Steele County's first brewery since prohibition!
Modist Brewing Company	Minneapolis	2016	
Montgomery Brewing Company	Montgomery	2014	
Nine Mile Brewing Company	Bloomington	2022	
The Nordic Brewing Company	Monticello	2018	
OMNI Brewing Company	Maple Grove	2015	
Outstate Brewing Company	Fergus Falls	2019	
Pantown Brewing Company	St. Cloud	2018	
Pig's Eye Brewing Company	Saint Paul	2002	
Portage Brewing Company	Walker	2017	
Pryes Brewing Company	Minneapolis	2017	
Reads Landing Brewery	Reads Landing	2011	
Revelation Ale Works	Hallock	2017	
Ripple Effect Brewing Company	Rogers	2024	
Rock Bottom Restaurant & Brewery	Minneapolis		
Roundhouse Brewery	Brainerd	2016	
Rustech Brewing Company	Monticello	2018	
Saint Paul Brewing	Saint Paul	2006	Located in the former Hamm's Brewery location. Formerly known as Flat Earth Brewing.
Sisyphus Brewing Company	Minneapolis	2014	
Sleepy Eye Brewing Company	Sleepy Eye	2019	
Spilled Grain Brewhouse	Annandale	2015	
Spiral Brewery	Hastings	2018	
Summit Brewing Company	Saint Paul	1986	
Surly Brewing Company	Minneapolis	2005	
Sylvan Brewing	Lanesboro	2020	
Take 16 Brewing Company	Luverne	2014	
Talking Waters Brewing Company	Montevideo	2016	
Tanzenwald Brewing Company	Northfield	2017	
Third Street Brewhouse	Cold Spring	1874	Located in the Cold Spring Brewery building. Renovated 2011.
Three Twenty Brewing Company	Pine City	2017	
Tilion Brewing Company	Cannon Falls	2018	
Town Hall Brewing	Minneapolis	1997	
Two Fathoms Brewing	Winona	2024	Former location of Island City Brewing.
Uncommon Loon Brewing Company	Chisago City	2018	Located in the former Chisago City Fire Hall and Community Center
Under Pressure Brewing	Golden Valley	2019	
Unmapped Brewing Company	Minnetonka	2017	
Utepils Brewing	Minneapolis	2017	
Venn Brewing Company	Minneapolis	2017	
Wabasha Brewing Company	Saint Paul	2016	Located in the old Yoerg brewery
Waconia Brewing Company	Waconia	2014	
Wicked Wort Brewing Company	Robbinsdale	2016	
Wooden Ship Brewing Company	Minneapolis	2021	

== See also ==
- Beer in the United States
- List of breweries in the United States
- List of microbreweries
