= Edward O. Hamlin =

American politician

Judge Edward Oscar Hamlin
- Born: June 12, 1828; Bethany, Pennsylvania
- Died: February 4, 1895 (aged 66); Honesdale, Pennsylvania
- Occupations: Attorney, Judge
- Years active: 1852-1885
- Political party: Democratic Party
- Spouse: Mary Eldred
- Parents: Ephraim Hamlin (father); Damaris F. Day (mother)

Edward Oscar Hamlin (June 12, 1828 – February 4, 1895) was an American politician active in Minnesota.

Hamlin was born in Bethany, Pennsylvania on June 12, 1828. His father was Judge Ephraim Warren Hamlin. He began practicing law in 1852. He moved to Minnesota in 1854, first moving to Sauk Rapids and worked as an attorney. He later moved to St. Cloud, Minnesota, and was elected as mayor there. In 1858, he was also the Fourth Judicial District Judge. In 1860, he was made a member of the University of Minnesota Board of Regents, a title he would hold until 1864.

In September 1861, Hamlin was nominated by the Democratic State Convention to run for Governor of Minnesota as the Democratic nominee that November. He lost to incumbent Republican Alexander Ramsey. Hamlin would then run to be on the Minnesota Supreme Court in 1864. That year, he was a delegate to the 1864 Democratic National Convention. He would not be elected to the Minnesota Supreme Court, but would run twice more, in 1869 and 1871, with less support each time. In 1873, he moved back to his home state of Pennsylvania.

Hamlin would continue to practice law in Wayne County until he retired in 1885 due to ill health.

== Personal life ==
Hamlin married Mary A. Eldred (1830-1868) in 1852. Her younger sister Lucinda Eldred was the wife of judge Ara Bartlett. Hamlin's second wife was Ella F. Strong (1847-1930). He had two sons, Frank E. Hamlin and Warren E. Hamlin.

Hamlin died on February 4, 1895 in Honesdale, Pennsylvania.

Party political offices
Preceded by George Loomis Becker	Democratic nominee for Governor of Minnesota; 1861	Succeeded by Henry T. Welles
