= Yoerg Brewing Company =

Defunct brewing company in Minnesota (1848–1956)

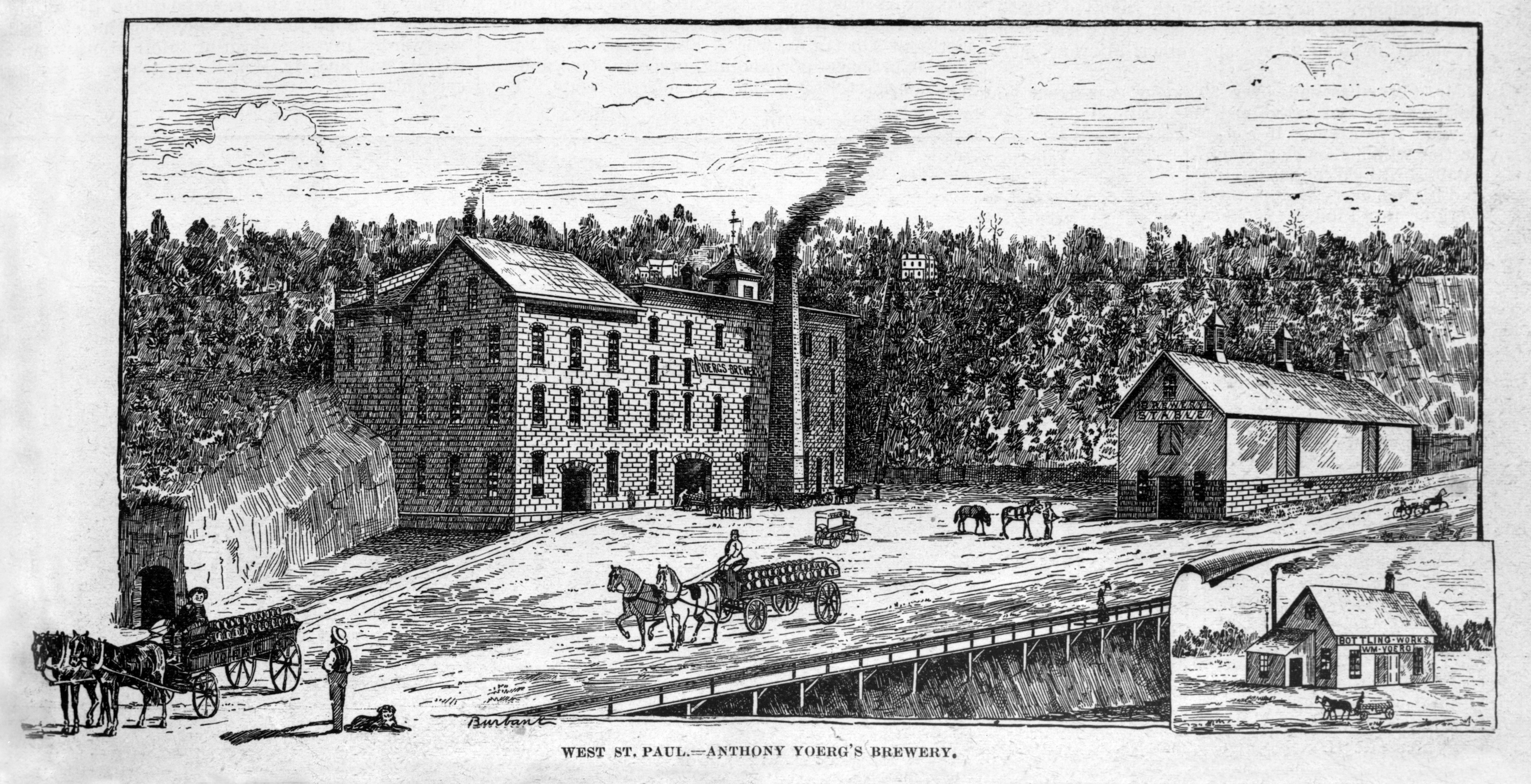
- Engraving of the Yoerg Brewery c. 1866
- Opened: 1848
- Closed: 1952
- Key people: Anthony Yoerg
- Owner: Anthony Yoerg
- Website: yoergbeer.com

The Yoerg Brewing Company (YBC), historically known as the Yoerg Brewery, was a brewing company in Saint Paul, Minnesota founded by German immigrant Anthony Yoerg. The Yoerg Brewing Company was the first brewery in Minnesota Territory founded in 1848.^{:16} The company survived prohibition in the United States before ceasing operations in 1952.^{:5}

== History ==
Anthony Yoerg (1816–1896) was a German-American immigrant born in Gundelfingen an der Donau on October 5, 1816.^{:16}^{:4} Yoerg emigrated to the United States in 1845 and originally settled in Pittsburgh, Pennsylvania before moving to Galena, Illinois and ultimately settling in Minnesota Territory by 1848 in Saint Paul.^{:16}

Around 1848 Yoerg created his own small brewing company along the Mississippi River.^{:16}^{:4} Yoerg's brewery is credited as the first brewery in Minnesota Territory and was the only brewery in the city until 1853.^{:4} Yoerg chose to erect his brewery along the east bank of the Mississippi River near the modern-day Irvine Park Historic District in order to excavate caves in the bluffs where he could lager his beer.^{:323}

In 1871, Yoerg's brewery expanded to the west side bluffs on Ohio Street in Saint Paul.^{:4} By 1881 Yoerg's brewery was processing 20,000 barrels of beer annually and by 1891, 35,000 barrels.^{:4} Yoerg's "cave aged beer", as it was eventually advertised, became a notable selling point due to Yoerg's unique lagering process.^{:3} During prohibition in the United States, Yoerg's brewery suffered in sales but stayed in business by producing soft drinks and low-alcohol beer.^{:5}

By 1941, the YBC had filed for bankruptcy, despite escaping its debts the company continued to decline, never again hitting its pre-prohibition sales. By 1952 flooding from the Mississippi River caused production to stagnate and decline further. The YBC officially closed by 1952 after three generations of family ownership.^{:5} A fire in 1958 destroyed the brewery building, which was located on Ohio Street near Isabel Street in Saint Paul.

== Revival ==
Beginning in 2016 Yoerg's beer was resurrected by Carol Minogue and Thomas Keim of Saint Paul. Minogue and Keim began a contract with the Octopi Brewing Company out of Waunakee, Wisconsin to reproduce Yoerg's beer. Minogue and Keim eventually leased property for the modern-day YBC at 378 Maria Avenue in Saint Paul's Dayton's Bluff neighborhood. YBC employees Barry Madore and Jason Pattit purchased the company from Minogue and Keim in 2026.

== Legacy ==
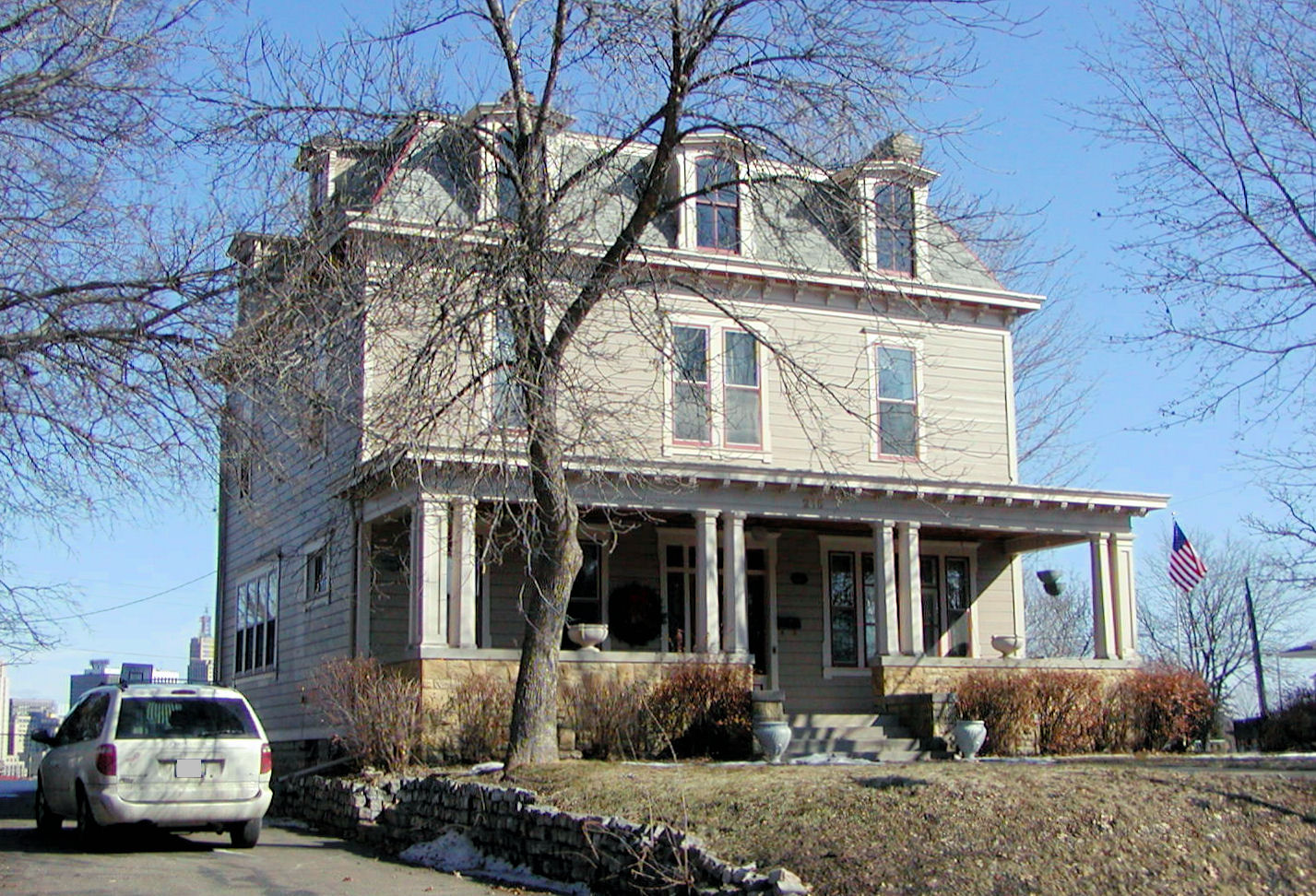
The Anthony Yoerg Sr. House located as 215 Isabel Street West in Saint Paul

Yoerg's home, the Anthony Yoerg Sr. House, located in Saint Paul's West Side neighborhood survives and is listed on the National Register of Historic Places for Ramsey County, Minnesota. The house is Second Empire style and was completed in 1875 by Monroe Sheire. The property was added to the National Register on May 29, 1989.
