= 1863 Minnesota gubernatorial election =

- November 3, 1863
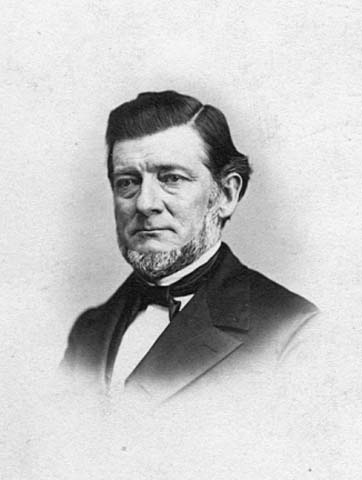

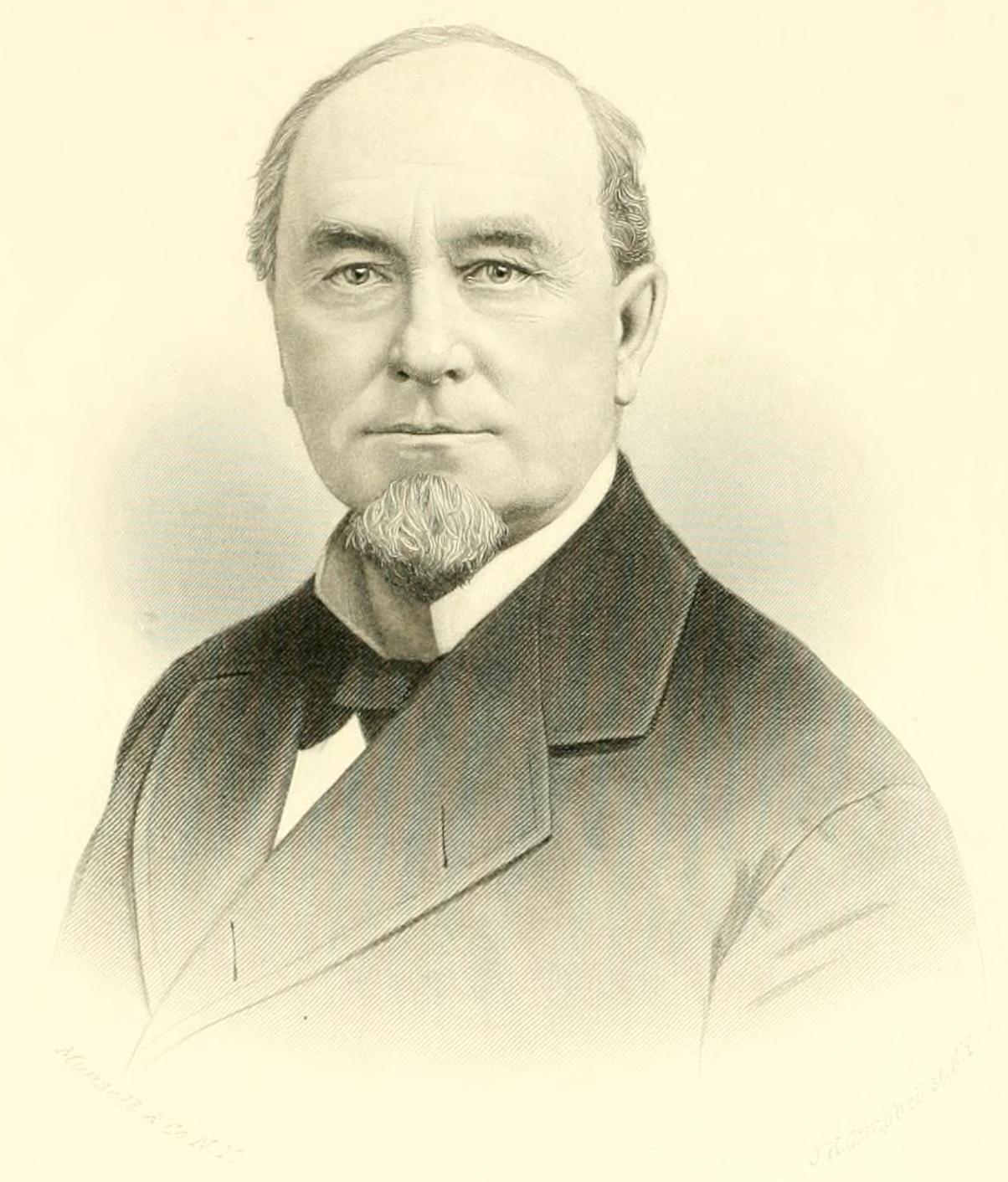
Nominee	Stephen Miller	Henry T. Welles
Party	National Union	Democratic
Popular vote	19,628	12,737
Percentage	60.65%	39.35%
Governor before election
Henry A. Swift
Republican
Elected Governor
Stephen Miller
National Union

The 1863 Minnesota gubernatorial election was held on November 3, 1863, to elect the governor of Minnesota. Incumbent governor Alexander Ramsey did not seek election, as he had been elected to the Senate that January. Due to the ongoing American Civil War, Minnesota Republicans nominated Stephen Miller on the Republican Union ticket. Miller would win the election. After Miller's victory, Governor Ramsey would resign, leaving Henry Adoniram Swift as governor between the election and inauguration of Stephen Miller.

== Candidates ==
- Stephen Miller, brigadier general (Republican Union)
- Henry T. Welles, former mayor of St. Anthony (Democrat)

== Campaigns ==
National Union nominations were made nearly unanimously. Incumbent governor Henry A. Swift was initially considering running for a term in his own right. He was the initial frontrunner, but withdrew, leaving Stephen Miller as the sole major candidate. Miller was already well known statewide. William Rainey Marshall considered running. State Senator from Hennepin County Rufus J. Baldwin was a minor candidate.

Henry M. Rice was considered a potential candidate by both parties, however he declined to align with either.

== Results ==
1863 Minnesota gubernatorial election
Party	Candidate	Votes	%
National Union	Stephen Miller	19,628	60.65
Democratic	Henry T. Welles	12,737	39.35
Total votes		32,367	100
National Union gain from Republican			
