= 1861 Minnesota gubernatorial election =

- October 8, 1861
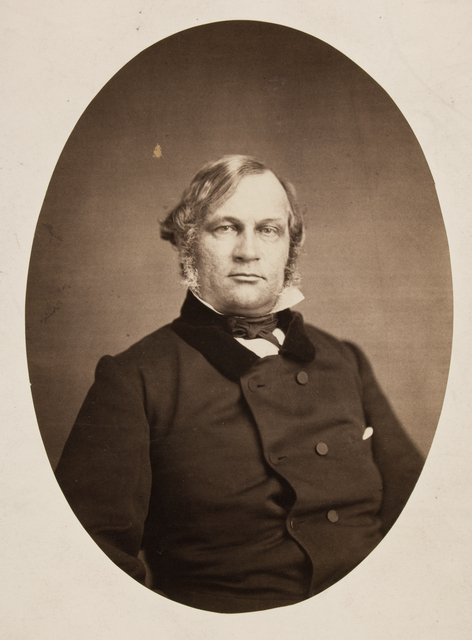

Nominee	Alexander Ramsey	Edward O. Hamlin
Party	Republican	Democratic
Popular vote	16,239	10,398
Percentage	60.80%	39.03%
Governor before election
Alexander Ramsey
Republican
Elected Governor
Alexander Ramsey
Republican

The 1861 Minnesota gubernatorial election took place on October 8, 1861. Republican incumbent governor Alexander Ramsey defeated Democratic mayor Edward O. Hamlin.

The Republicans unanimously renominated Ramsey. The Democratic State Convention met on September 12, 1861. Hamlin was nominated by acclamation.

== Candidates ==
- Alexander Ramsey, incumbent governor (Republican)
- Edward O. Hamlin, mayor of St. Cloud (Democratic)
- William Dike (People's Union) (withdrew)

== General election ==
=== Campaigns ===
These were the first state elections held during the American Civil War. In Minnesota and other Union states, some Republicans and War Democrats favored the suspension of party politics for the duration of the conflict. These groups held a nonpartisan state convention that nominated Republican William Dike for governor and Democrat Christopher Columbus Andrews for lieutenant governor on the People's Union ticket. Ramsey and other Minnesota Republicans strongly opposed the Union Party scheme, which they viewed as a Democratic strategy to recoup the party's lagging fortunes in the state. Dike withdrew from the race under pressure, clearing the way for a Republican landslide victory in the general election.

=== Results ===
Minnesota gubernatorial election, 1861
Party	Candidate	Votes	%
Republican	Alexander Ramsey (incumbent)	16,274	60.80
Democratic	Edward O. Hamlin	10,448	39.03
	Write-Ins	45	0.15
Total votes		26,767	100
Republican hold			

== Bibliography ==
- Blegen, Theodore (1975). Minnesota: A History of the State. Minneapolis: University of Minnesota Press.
- Dubin, Michael J. (2014). United States Gubernatorial Elections, 1861–1911: The Official Results by State and County. Jefferson, NC: McFarland and Company. ISBN 978-0-7864-5646-8.
