= Barrel Theory Beer Company =

Brewery in Minnesota, United States

- Location: 248 East 7th Street, St. Paul, Minnesota, United States
- Opened: 2017
- Website: barreltheory.com

Barrel Theory Beer Company is a microbrewery located in the Lowertown neighborhood of Saint Paul, Minnesota. It was founded by Brett Splinter, Timmy Johnson and Todd Tibesar. Splinter and Johnson had previously worked for Surly Brewing Company as the director of IT and as a brewer, respectively. The company's name is a reference to Liebig’s Law of the Minimum.

The brewery opened in a historic Lowertown commercial building in June 2017. In addition to a taproom and 10-barrel brewing facility, the building has a 4,000 square feet (370 m^{2}) limestone cellar being used for barrel aging. Given their limited production capacity, their beers are only available at the taproom or in limited local distribution.

Since opening, the brewery has received a number of accolades. It appeared on multiple local and national lists of best new breweries and won a "best new brewery" reader poll sponsored by USA Today. Reviews praise the quality and breadth of their beers with Thrillist noting "there's hardly a worst beer here" and local newspaper City Pages commending their "consistent, balanced approach to greatness".
