= Anthony Yoerg Sr. House =

Historic house in Minnesota, United States

- U.S. National Register of Historic Places
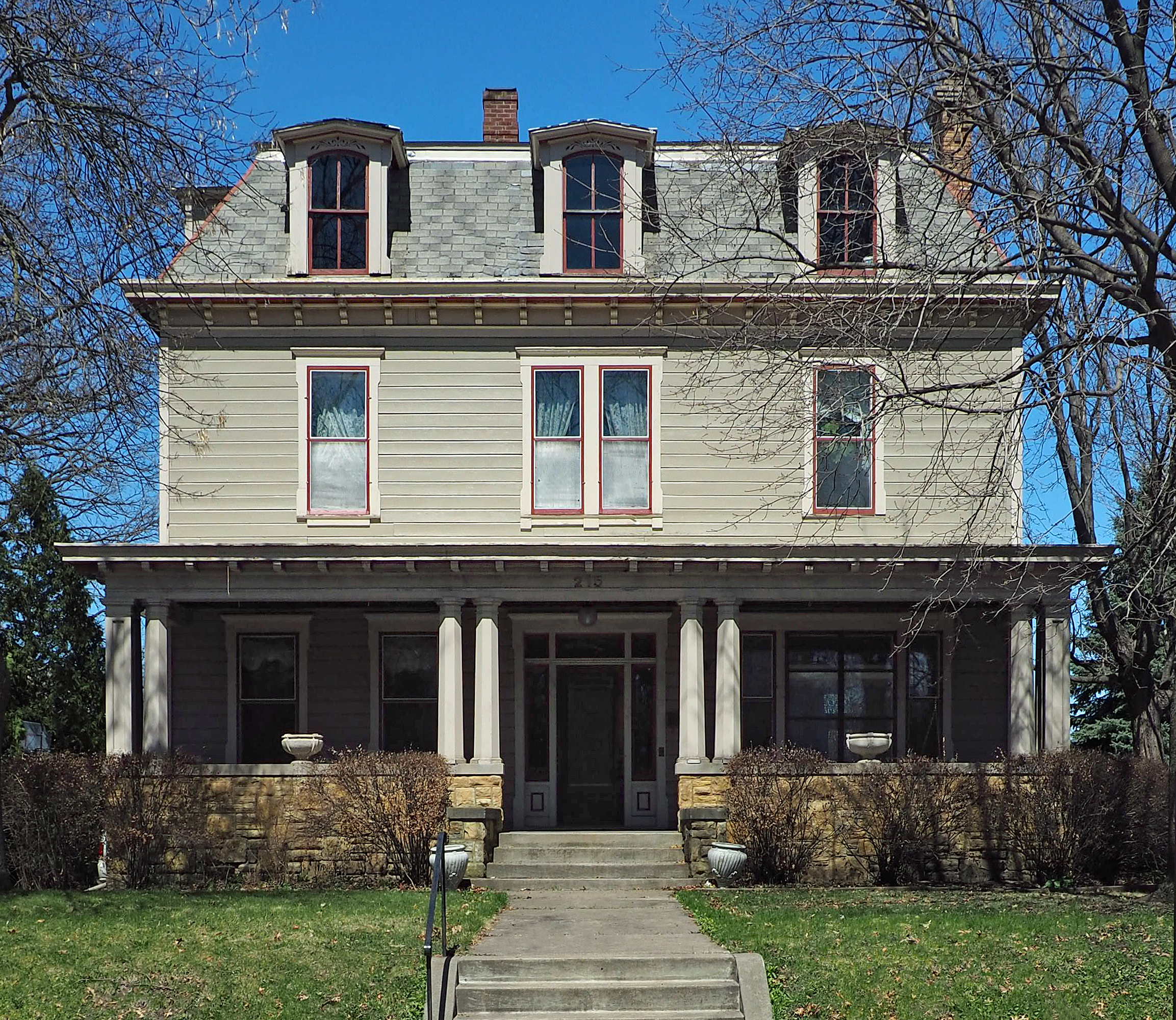
- The Anthony Yoerg Sr. House from the south

- Location within Minnesota Location within the United States
- Location: 215 Isabel Street West, Saint Paul, Minnesota
- Coordinates: 44°56′0″N 93°5′41″W
- Built: 1875
- Architect: Sheire, Monroe & Brother
- Architectural style: Second Empire
- NRHP reference No.: 89000442
- Added to NRHP: May 25, 1989

The Anthony Yoerg Sr. House is a historic house in Saint Paul, Minnesota, United States. It was the home of Anthony Yoerg (1816–1896), a Bavarian immigrant who constructed Minnesota's first brewery; the house is located high on the bluffs and the brewery was located just below the house on the lowlands in Saint Paul's West Side neighborhood. It is listed on the National Register of Historic Places.

The house was completed in 1875 by Monroe Sheire, and is one of the few surviving works by Sheire. One other surviving work is the Alexander Ramsey House, completed in 1872.
