= Henry T. Welles =

American lawyer

Henry Titus Welles
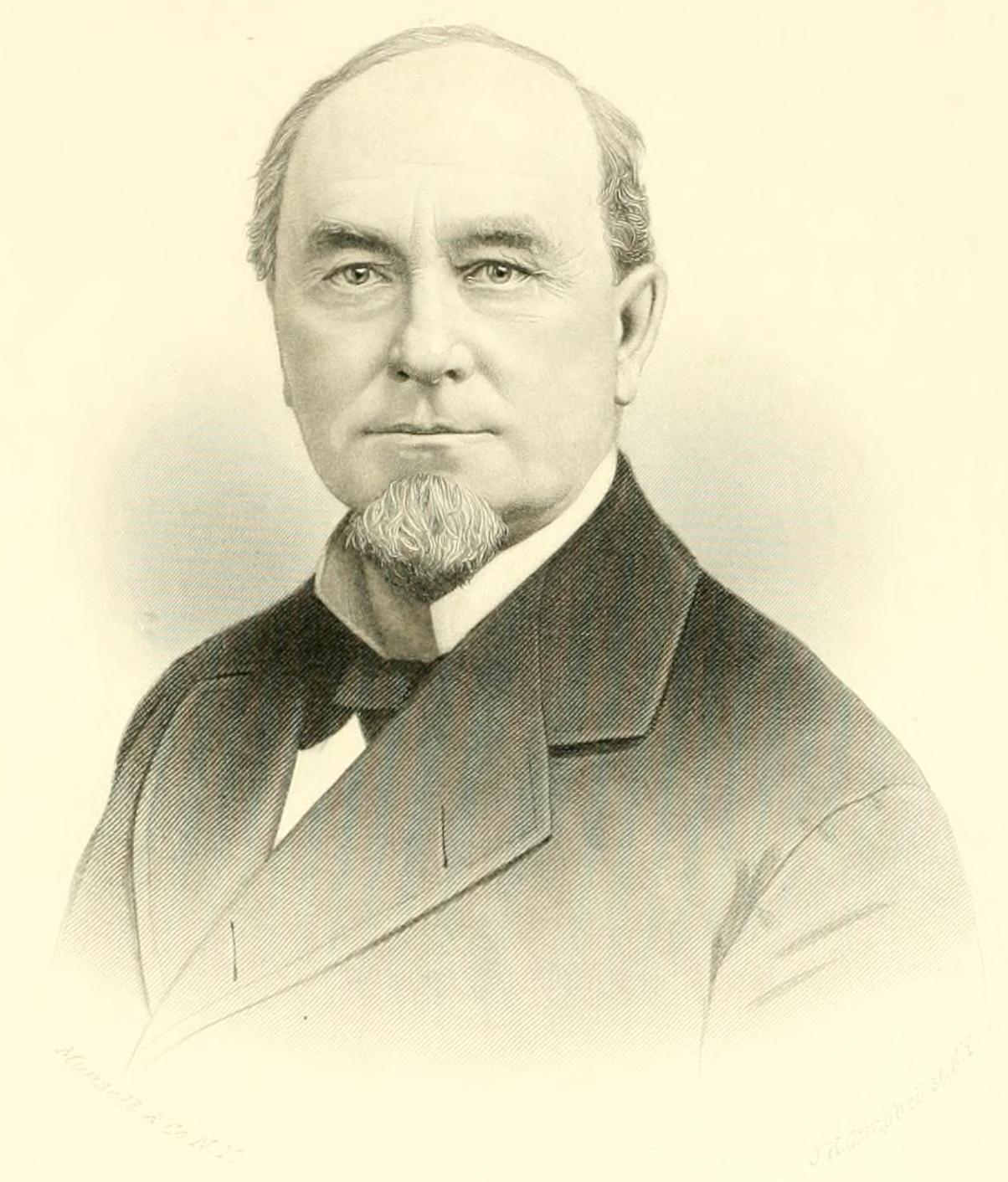
- Welles in 1893

Mayor of St. Anthony, Minnesota
- In office April 13, 1855 – April 9, 1856
- Succeeded by: Alvaren Allen

Personal details
- Born: April 3, 1821 Glastonbury, Connecticut, U.S.
- Died: March 4, 1898 (aged 76) Minneapolis, Minnesota, U.S.
- Resting place: Lakewood Cemetery
- Spouse: Jerusha Lord
- Occupation: Lawyer

Henry Titus Welles (April 3, 1821 – March 4, 1898) was a lawyer, businessman and Democratic politician who served as the first mayor of St. Anthony, Minnesota.

== Life and career ==
Welles was born in Glastonbury, Connecticut on April 3, 1821 to Jonathan and Jerusha Welles. He grew up working on the family's farm and later attended Trinity College, graduating in 1843. He went on to study law and was admitted to the bar in 1845. In 1850 he was elected to the Connecticut General Assembly.

In 1853 Welles moved west, arriving in St. Paul, Minnesota, that June. Shortly after arriving he visited St. Anthony Falls and became taken by the sight. He relocated to the young city of St. Anthony and went into the lumber business with Franklin Steele. In 1855 he was elected the first mayor of St. Anthony. In that same year he and Steele built the first major bridge crossing the Mississippi between what was then the two towns of St. Anthony and Minneapolis. In 1863 Welles was the Democratic nominee for governor but lost to Stephen Miller.

Welles was closely tied to various business interests in the Minneapolis area. He was involved in the organization of the Northwestern National Bank and the Farmers & Mechanics Savings Bank. He was also a strong advocate for the Minneapolis & Duluth and Minneapolis & St. Louis railroads. Outside of Minneapolis and St. Anthony Welles also owned significant real estate in the towns of St. Cloud, Minnesota, and Breckenridge, Minnesota, much of which he gave away. He also gave significant support to the Minnesota State Academies in Faribault, Minnesota, and various churches in Minneapolis.

Welles died in Minneapolis on March 4, 1898. He is buried in Lakewood Cemetery in Minneapolis.

Party political offices
Preceded by Edward O. Hamlin	Democratic nominee for Governor of Minnesota; 1863	Succeeded by Henry Mower Rice
