= Irvine Park Historic District =

Historic neighborhood in Saint Paul, Minnesota

- U.S. National Register of Historic Places
- U.S. Historic district
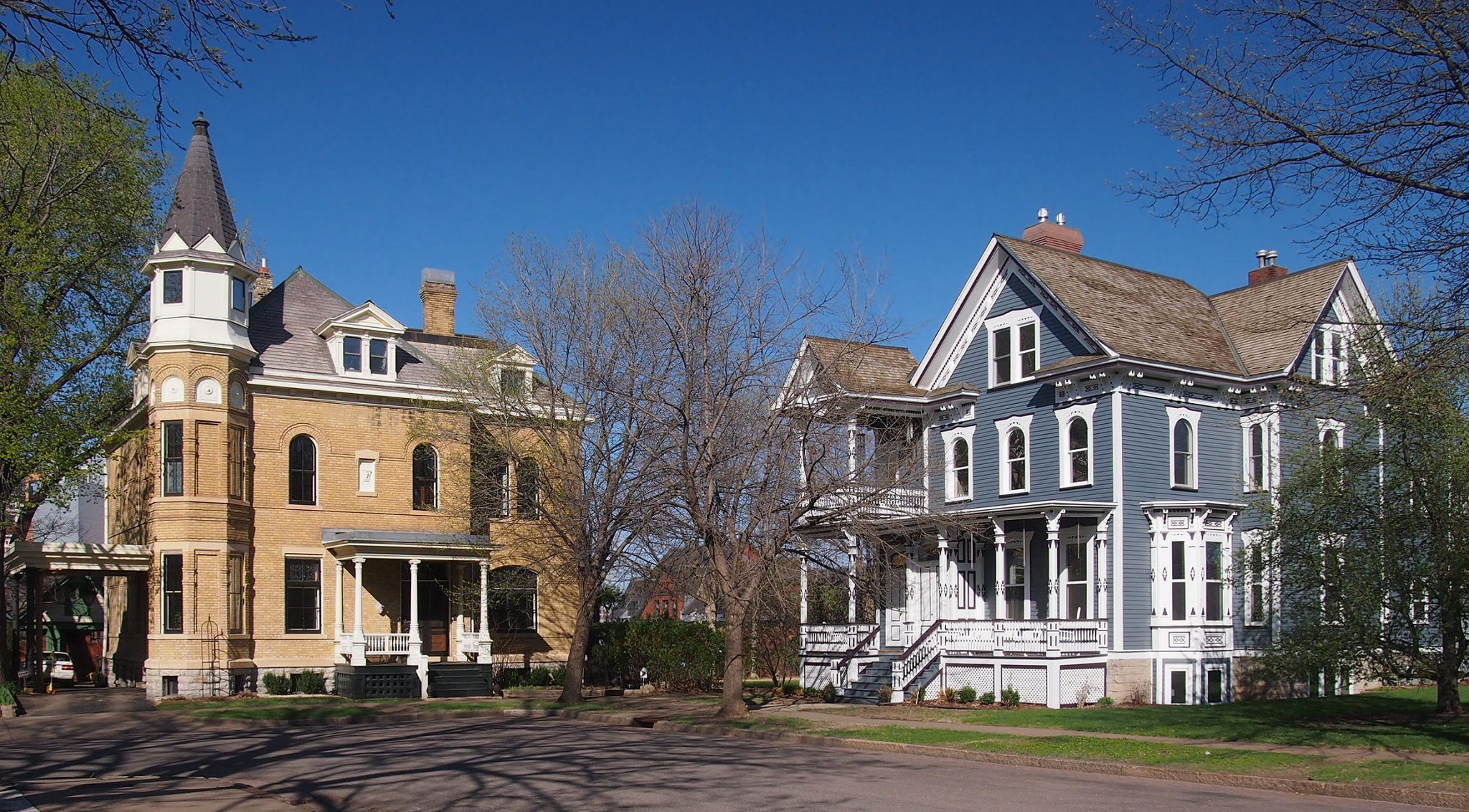
- The Ohage and McDonald Houses in Irvine Park

- Location within Minnesota Location within the United States
- Location: Roughly bounded by Elm Street, West 7th, Eagle Parkway, and Shepard Road; Saint Paul, Minnesota
- Coordinates: 44°56′27″N 93°6′10″W
- Built: 1849
- Architect: Multiple
- Architectural style: Greek Revival, Italianate, Queen Anne
- NRHP reference No.: 73000993
- Added to NRHP: November 27, 1973

Irvine Park is a neighborhood just west of downtown Saint Paul, Minnesota, United States, that contains a number of historic homes. The neighborhood was platted by John Irvine and Henry Mower Rice in 1849. At the center of the neighborhood is Irvine Park, a New England–style public square. The neighborhood is a district listed on the National Register of Historic Places and also designated by the city as a historic district.

The neighborhood suffered for much of the twentieth century. A report on housing from the 1930s characterized the area as being:

... in the less desirable rooming-house district; old homes, that at one time were mansions, but, over a period of years have been out-moded. Each successive tenant has been a little less able to pay adequate rent until the present occupants have commercialized the homes in one form or another.

In 1970, 96 percent of the neighborhood's houses were classified as substandard by the city. In the early 1970s the city planned to tear down the area and replace it with high-rise apartments for public housing. This plan was not implemented, however, and the neighborhood became a National Register Historic District in 1973. Irvine Park was named Saint Paul Heritage Preservation District in 1982.

== Houses in the district ==
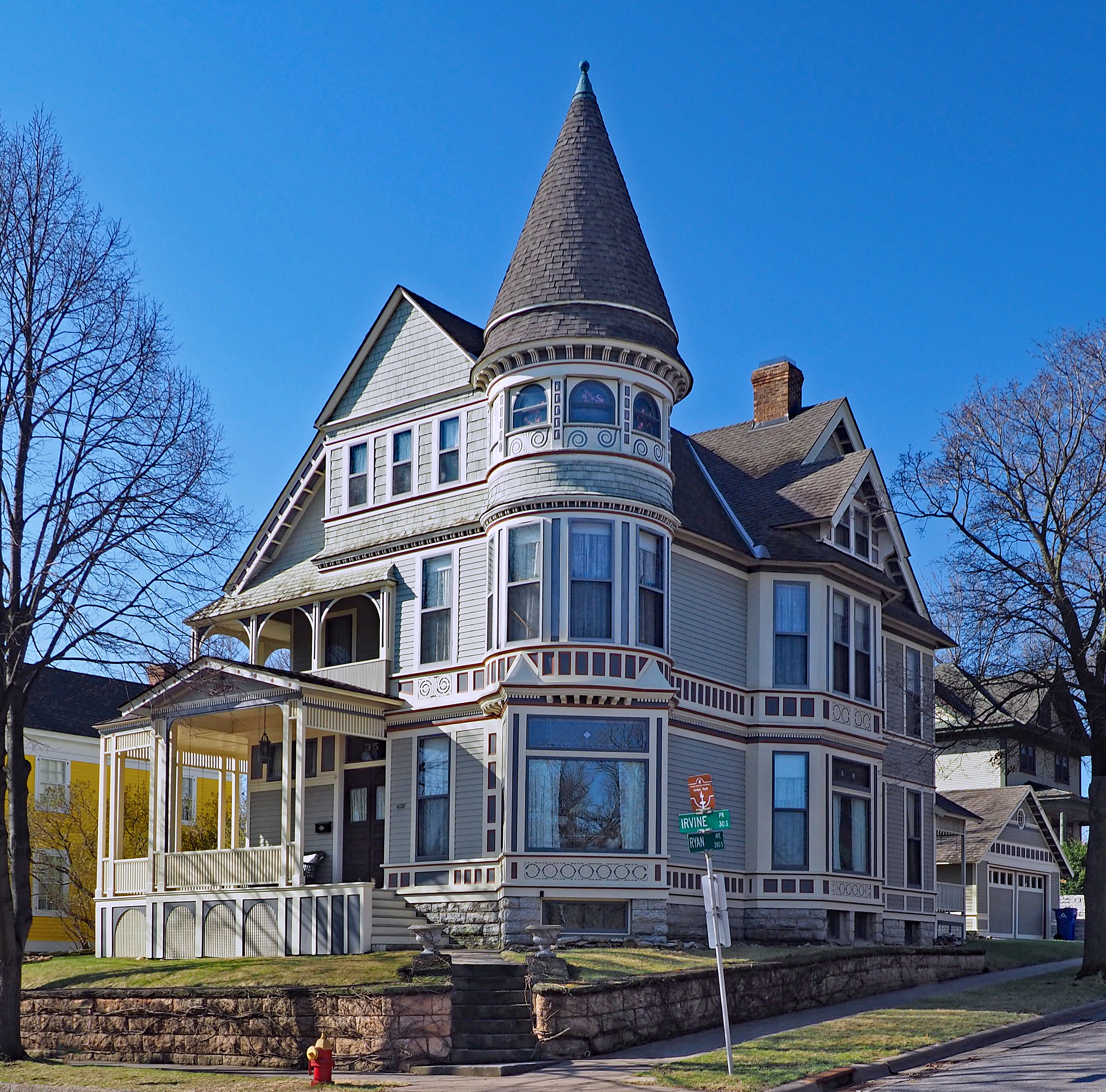

The Murray-Lanpher House was designed by Edward P. Bassford in 1886. Architectural critic Larry Millett writes, "This is probably what most people have in mind when they dream of a Queen Anne house."

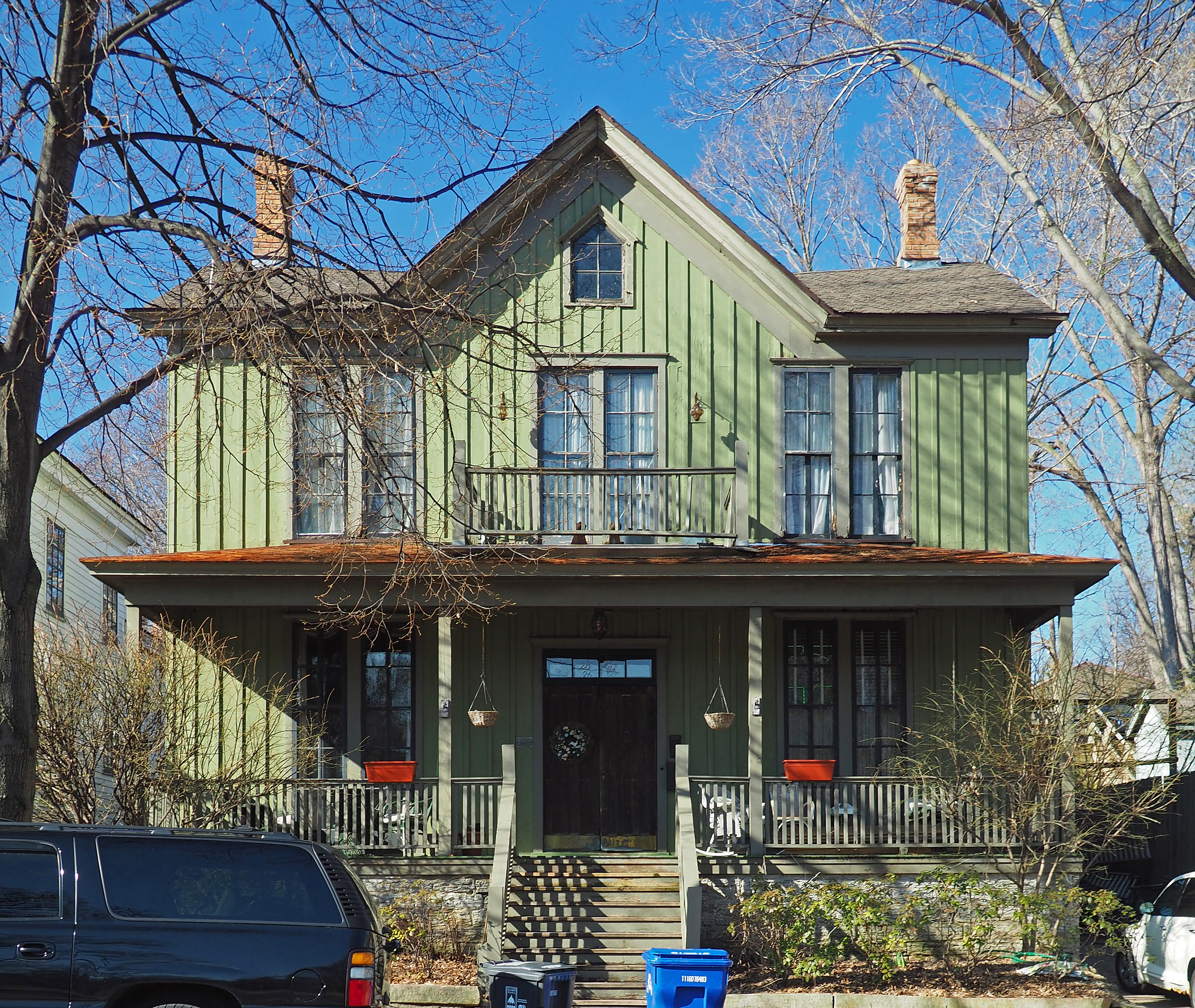

The Jay and Henry Knox House was built in 1860 by two brothers who were bankers. This is one of the few Carpenter Gothic houses in the Twin Cities. The vertical board and batten siding, a trademark of the style, was covered beneath stucco until its new owners began restoring the house in the 1970s.

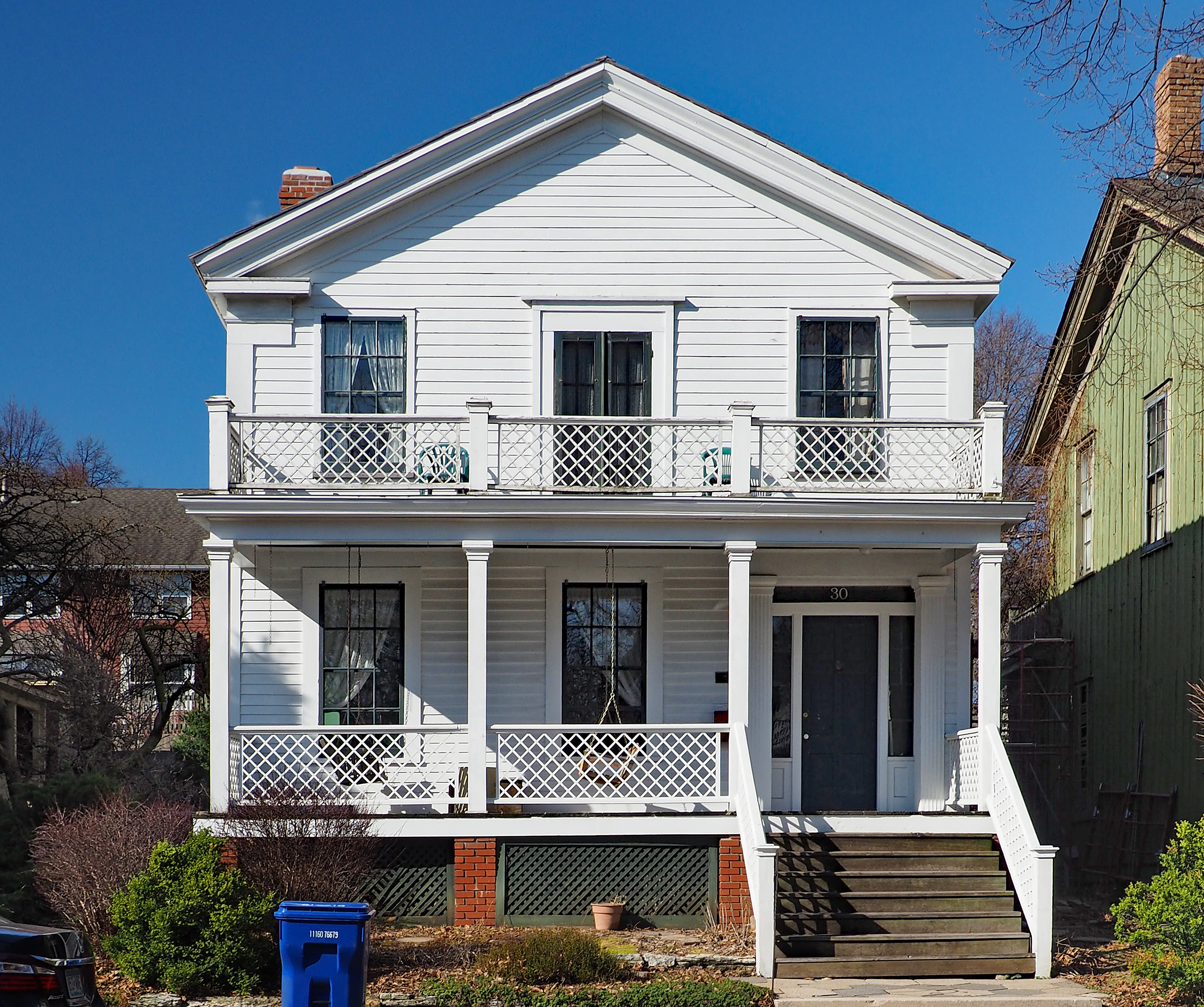

The Parker-Marshall House, a Greek Revival design, is the oldest house on the park, built in 1852. It was originally located where the Murray-Lanpher House is now, then was moved to an adjoining lot in 1883 and then moved to its current site in 1976.

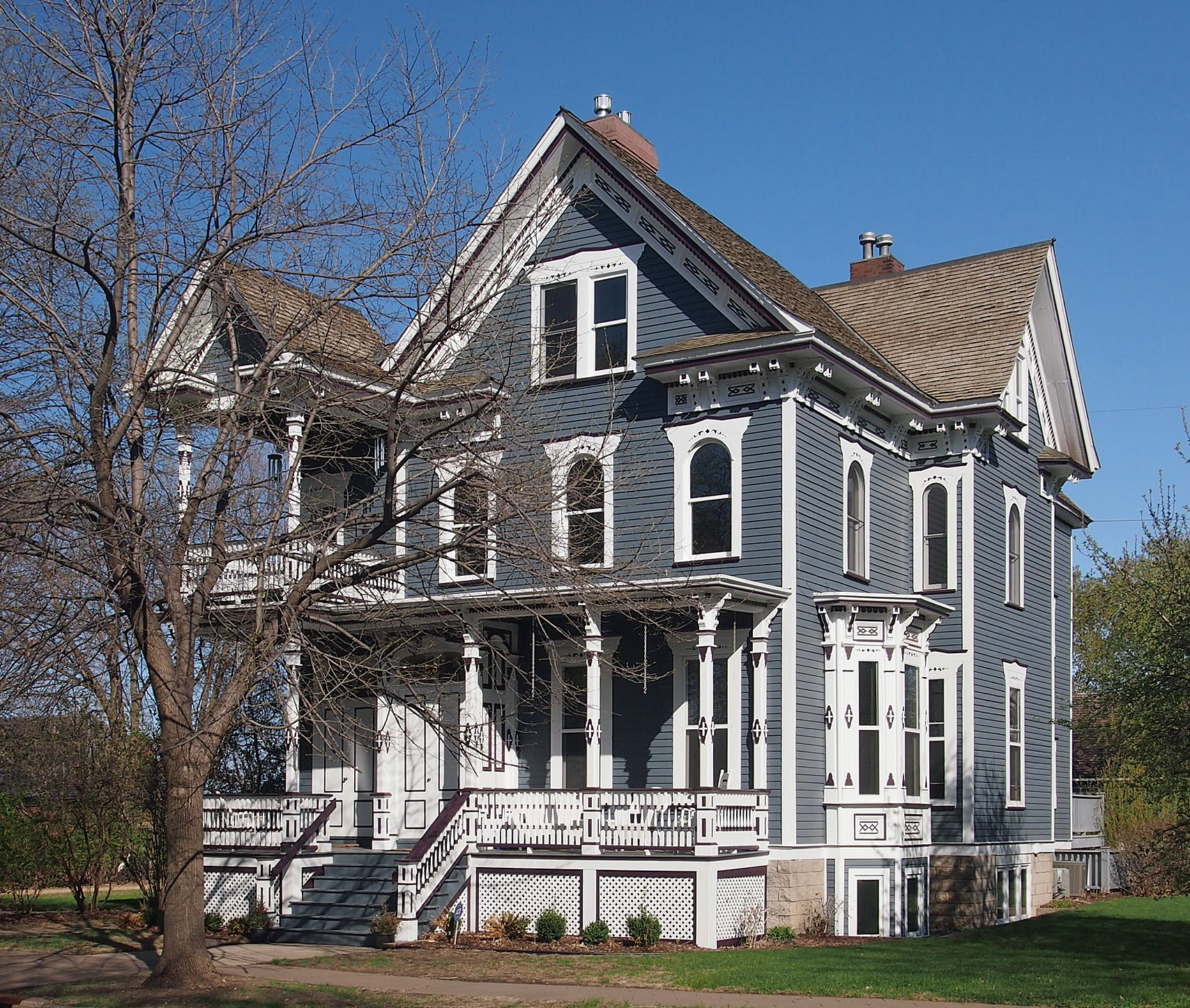

The John McDonald House is an Italianate design from 1873. It was moved from its original location on Smith Avenue in 1978. A local legend states that the house is the only house in St. Paul history to receive a parking ticket when the structure was parked in the street overnight in the process of moving it.

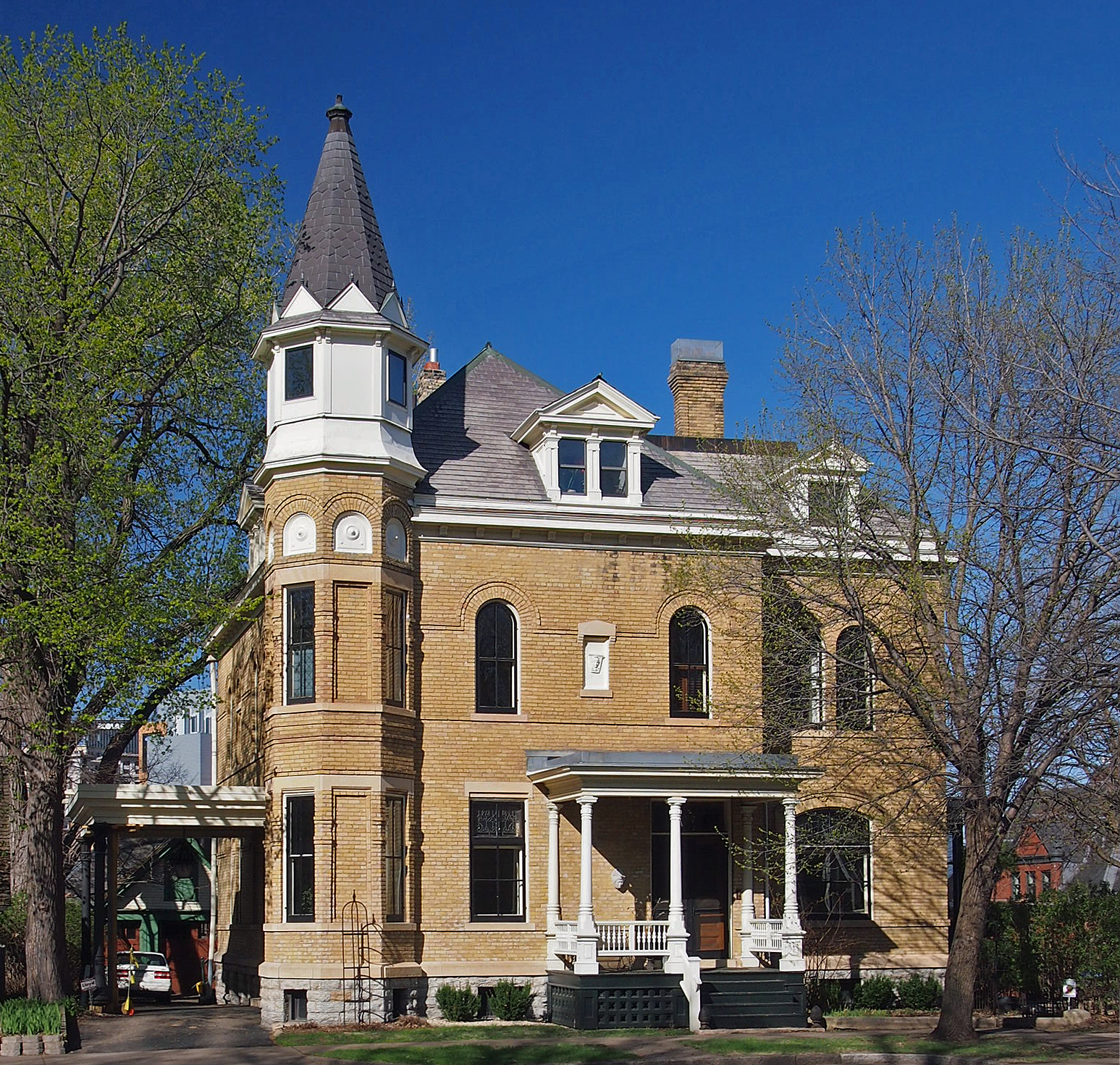

The Justus Ohage House is a Romanesque Revival design with Germanic features from 1889. The house was supposedly designed to resemble the childhood home of his wife Augusta from when she grew up in St. Louis, Missouri. Unfortunately, Augusta died at age 34 just a few weeks after the house was finished. Dr. Ohage raised the couple's five children and made several other accomplishments, such as establishing St. Paul's public health service, built public bathhouses, and opened the first city zoo at Harriet Island before donating the land to the city, and performed the first successful gall bladder operation in the United States in 1886.

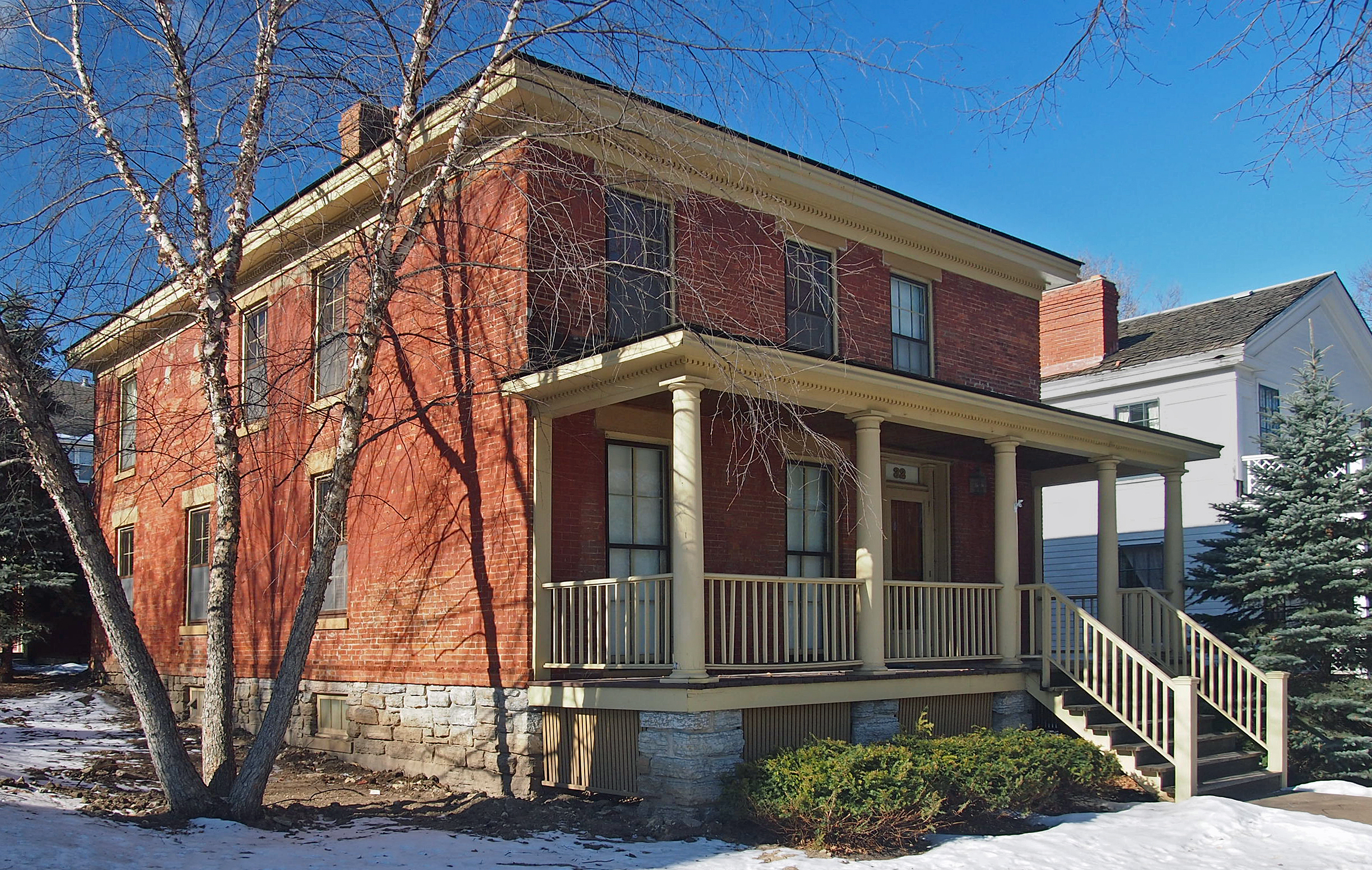

The Simpson-Wood House is a simple Federal Style house that was originally built in 1853, and located a block away on Sherman Street, before being moved to Irvine Park in 1978.

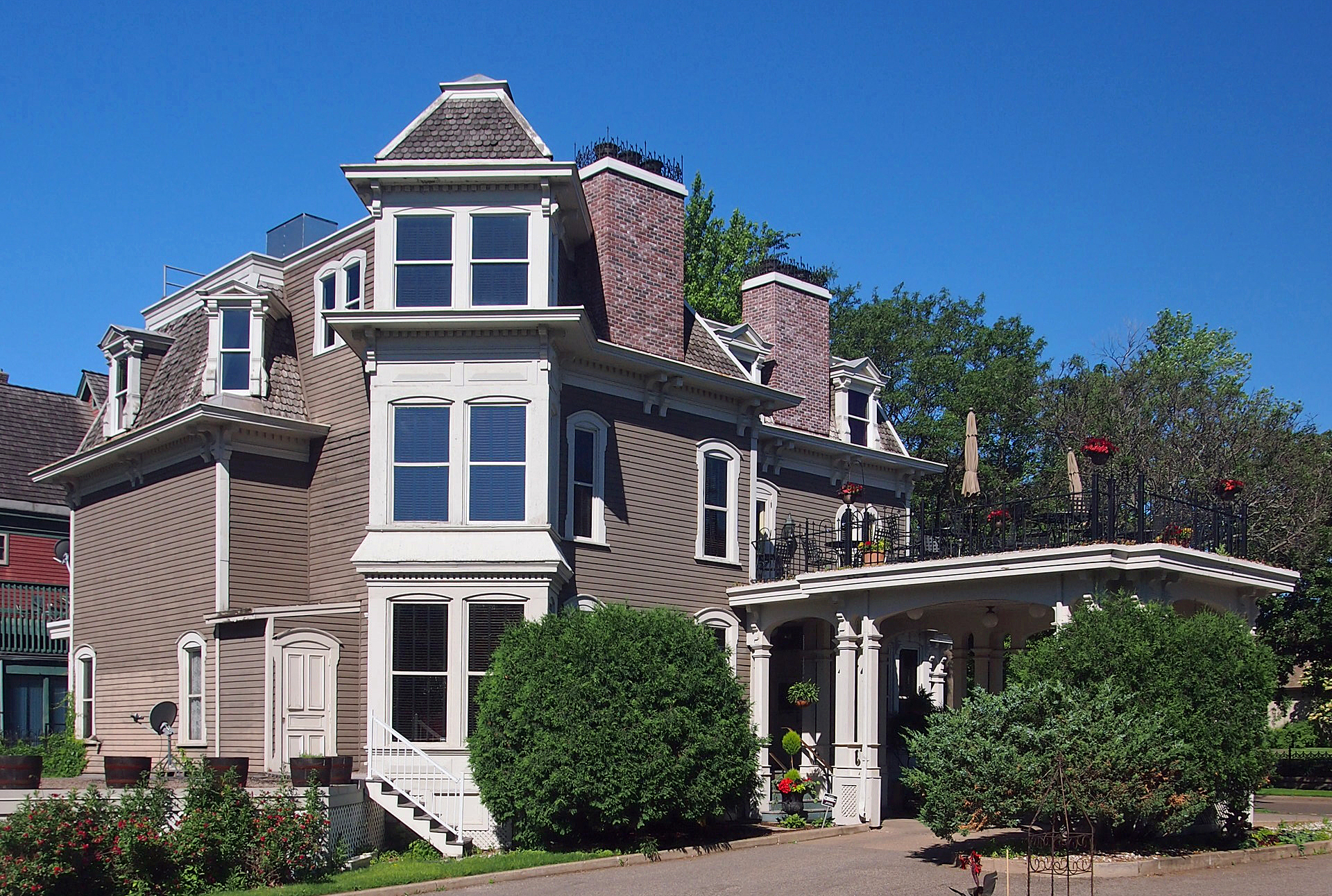

The Joseph Forepaugh House, now known as Forepaugh's Restaurant, was built by a dry goods dealer who supplied troops during the American Civil War and made enough money to retire at age 34. The house dates back to 1870.

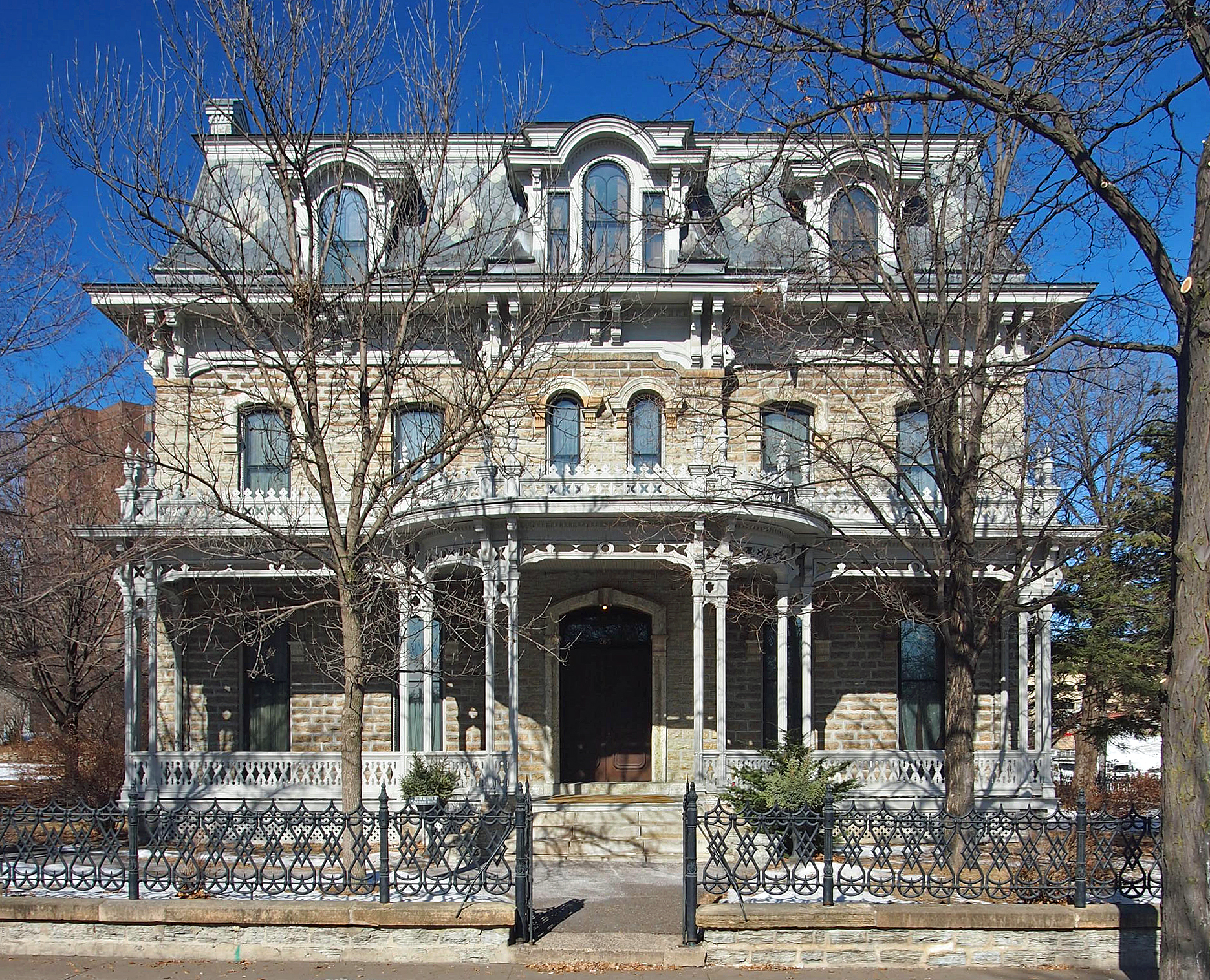

The Alexander Ramsey House is located across Exchange Street from the Irvine Park public square. It was the residence of Alexander Ramsey, the first governor of Minnesota Territory and the second governor of the state of Minnesota. The house was completed in 1872 in the French Second Empire style. It is now owned by the Minnesota Historical Society, which now operates it as a museum.

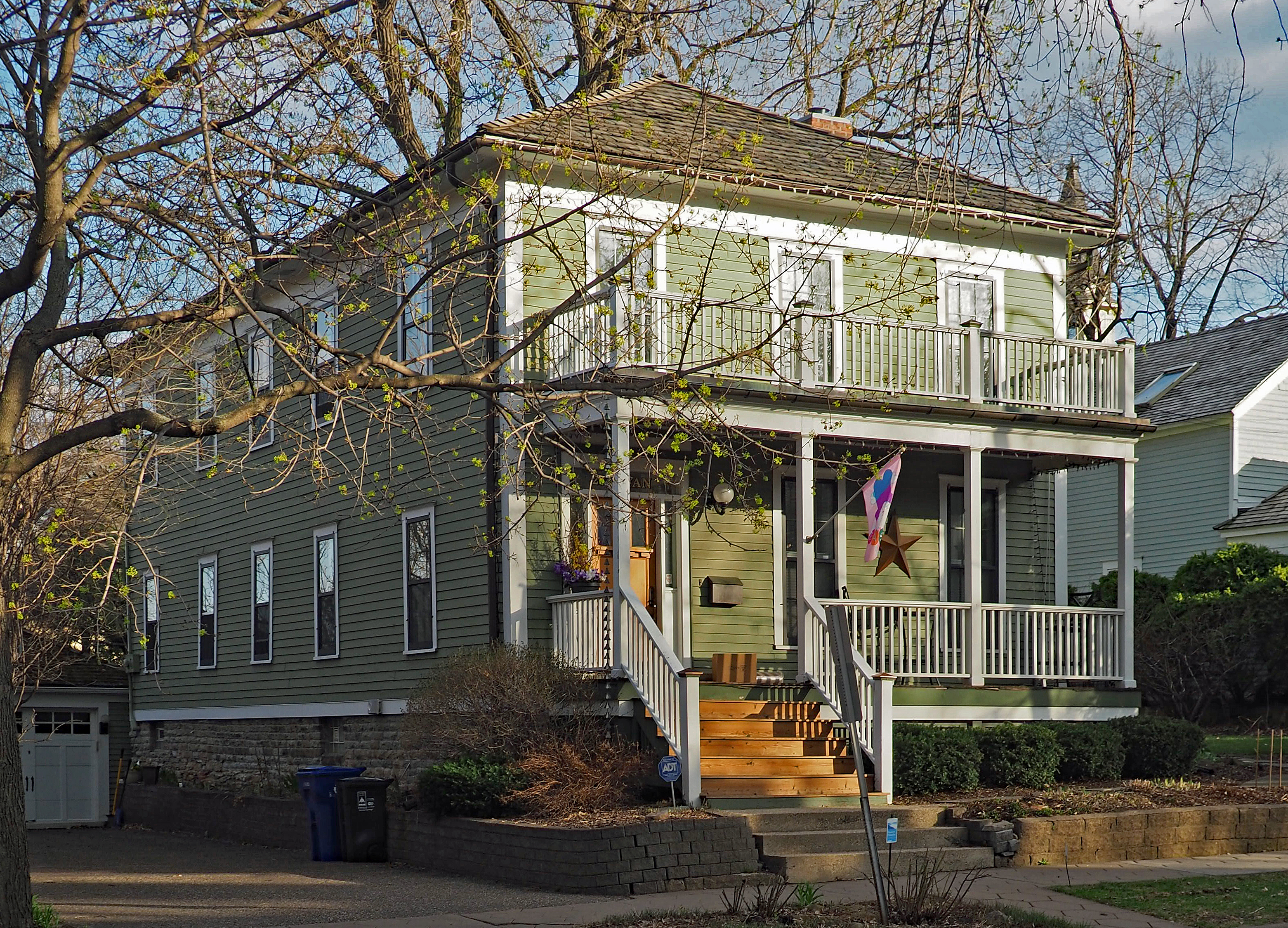

The Charles Symonds House was built in 1850 and is thought to be St. Paul's oldest house. It was built by Charles Symonds, a former sea captain, and originally located across the street and about a block to the east.

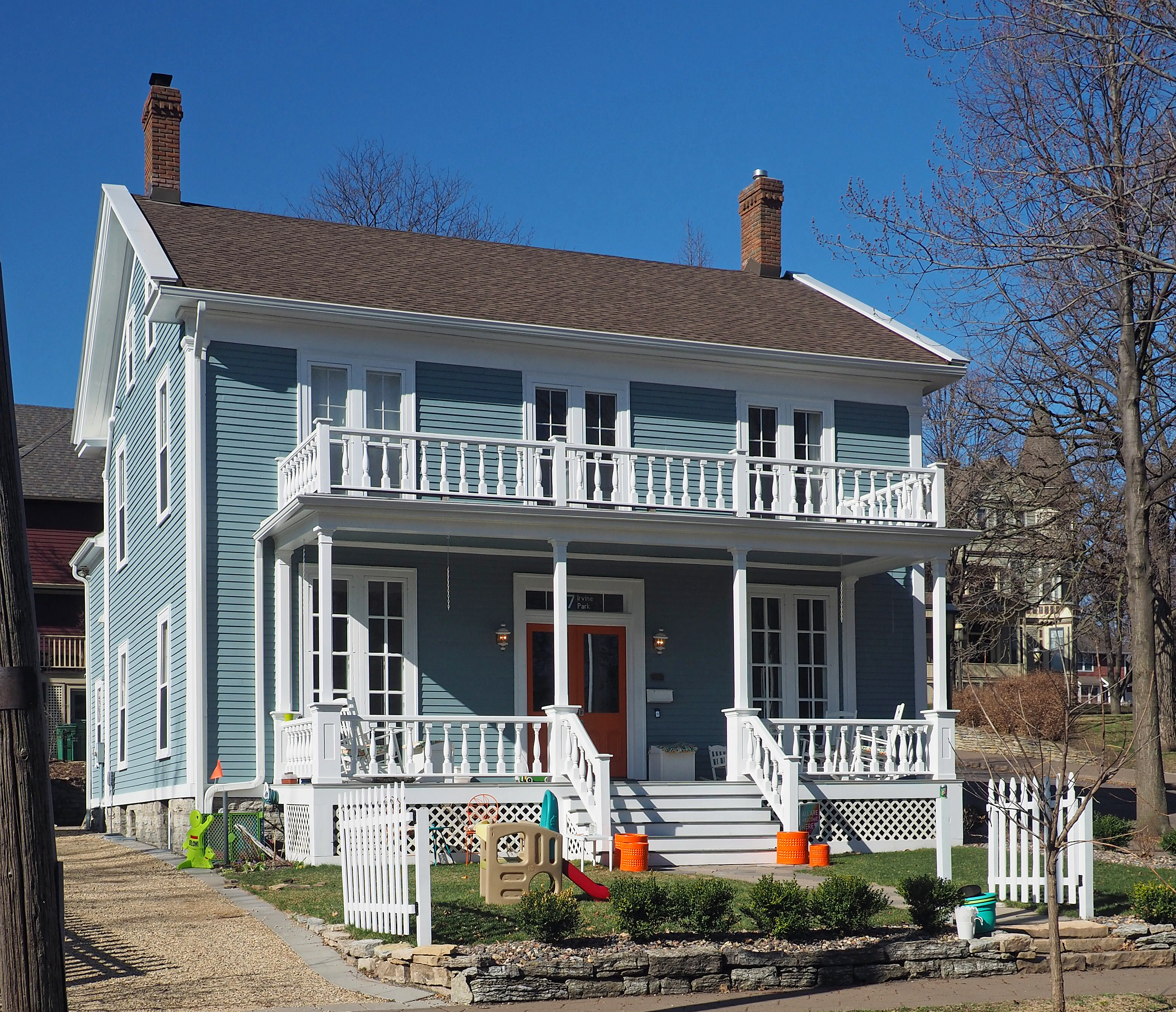

The William A. Spencer House at 47 Irvine Park was built 1856–1857 in a variant of pioneer Greek Revival architecture in which the roofline is parallel to the street. The two-story veranda is a later addition.
