= Stephen Miller (Minnesota politician) =

American politician (1816–1881)

Brigadier General Stephen Miller
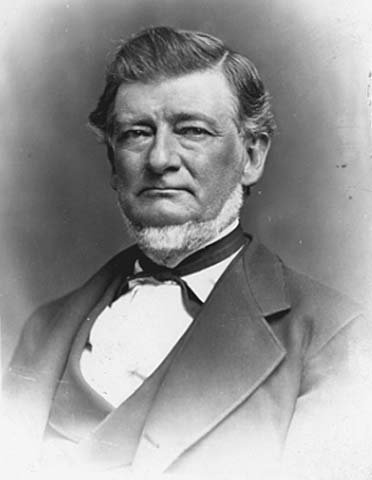
- Miller in 1866

4th Governor of Minnesota
- In office January 11, 1864 – January 8, 1866
- Lieutenant: Charles D. Sherwood
- Preceded by: Henry Adoniram Swift
- Succeeded by: William Rainey Marshall

Member of the Minnesota House of Representatives from District 38
- In office January 7, 1873 – January 5, 1874

Personal details
- Born: January 7, 1816 Carroll Township, Pennsylvania, US
- Died: August 18, 1881 (aged 65) Worthington, Minnesota, US
- Party: Republican
- Spouse: Margaret Funk
- Profession: Businessperson, real estate agent, attorney, soldier

Military service
- Allegiance: United States of America
- Branch/service: Union Army
- Years of service: April 2, 1861 - January 18, 1864
- Rank: Colonel, Brevet Brigadier General
- Unit: 1st Minnesota Infantry Regiment; 7th Minnesota Infantry Regiment
- Commands: 1st Minnesota Infantry Regiment, Lieutenant Colonel.; 7th Minnesota Infantry Regiment, Colonel.
- Battles/wars: American Civil War; First Battle of Bull Run; Battle of Ball's Bluff; Siege of Yorktown; Battle of Seven Pines; Battle of Savage's Station; Battle of Malvern Hill; Dakota War of 1862; Battle of Wood Lake; Sibley's Expedition Against the Sioux; Battle of Big Mound; Battle of Dead Buffalo Lake; Battle of Stony Lake

Stephen Miller (January 7, 1816 – August 18, 1881) was an American Republican politician. He was the first Civil War veteran to serve as Minnesota Governor. He was the fourth governor of Minnesota.

== Early years and business entrepreneur ==
Born in Carroll Township, Pennsylvania, Stephen Miller established a series of successful businesses. Frail health prompted the entrepreneur, of Pennsylvania Dutch heritage, to leave home at age 42 and follow his friend Alexander Ramsey to Minnesota, where the climate reportedly was more congenial. Miller established a mercantile business in St. Cloud and, within two years, had risen to prominence in the state Republican Party.

== Civil War soldier and leader ==
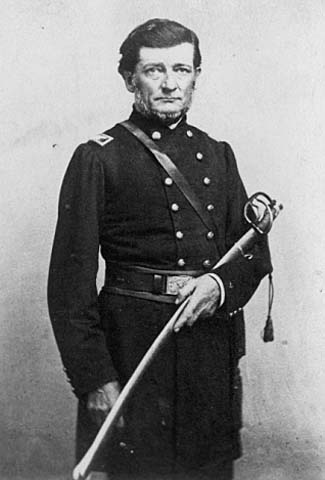
Stephen Miller in 1863

During the American Civil War, Miller, a middle-aged politician and businessman with no previous military experience, enlisted in the 1st Minnesota Infantry Regiment and was appointed as the Lieutenant Colonel of the regiment. Miller served with the 1st Minnesota in the Army of the Potomac from April, 1861 until August, 1862. In August 1862 during the Dakota War of 1862 Miller was promoted to the rank of Colonel and given command of the newly raised 7th Minnesota Infantry Regiment. Following the Dakota War Miller replaced Brig. Gen. Henry Hastings Sibley as the commander of Mankato's Camp Lincoln. There, 303 Dakota men were convicted of participating in the Dakota War of 1862, awaited their fate. Four months later, Miller supervised, by order of President Lincoln, the mass execution of 38 Dakotas condemned for their part in the war. On November 6, 1863 following his service with the 7th Minnesota Miller was promoted to the rank of Brigadier General. After his promotion to Brigadier General Miller resigned from service in the military and ran for Governor of Minnesota.

== Governor of Minnesota ==
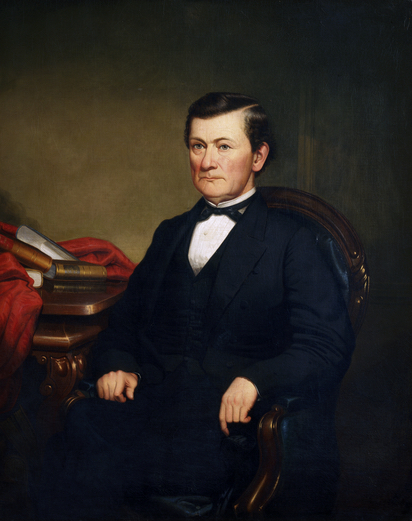
Miller's official portrait as Governor

Incumbent governor Henry A. Swift was initially considering running for a term in his own right, however withdrew, leaving Miller as the sole major candidate. Miller was already well known statewide for his loyalty to the Union, and was described by the Winona Republican Herald as "a man of energy, ability and honesty." In the 1863 Minnesota gubernatorial election, Miller won against Henry T. Welles. Prior to taking office, Miller also attempted to convince President Abraham Lincoln to approve the construction of a national hospital in Winona, however the proposal was denied on the basis that the city was not accessible by railroad in the winter.

At his inauguration, he stated his goals for his term were the creation of a bureau of education, investment in normal schools, the establishment of an immigration agency, and an increase in government workers' salaries.

His military career and Alexander Ramsey's support assured Miller of a gubernatorial victory in 1863. He was the 4th Governor of Minnesota, serving from January 11, 1864, to January 8, 1866. He was the first of several Civil War veterans to serve as Governor of Minnesota. Although lacking a college degree himself, he valued higher education and advocated generous appropriations to the University of Minnesota and to state normal schools, one of which evolved into St. Cloud State University. In his final address to the legislature, he strongly but unsuccessfully urged adoption of a black suffrage amendment to the state constitution.

== Later years and term as state representative ==
Miller chose not to run for re-election and was unemployed until 1871, when he became a railroad-company field agent in Windom. He served as a state representative from January 7, 1873, to January 5, 1874, representing then-District 38, which included all or portions of Cottonwood, Jackson, Murray, Nobles, Pipestone and Rock counties in the southwestern part of the state. During his term, he was chair of the House's Public Lands Committee. In 1876, he was a representative to the Electoral College. The one-time war hero and popular governor died alone, an impoverished widower, in Worthington in 1881.

Party political offices
Preceded by Alexander Ramsey	Republican nominee for Governor of Minnesota; 1863	Succeeded by William Rainey Marshall
Political offices
Preceded by Henry Adoniram Swift	Governor of Minnesota; 1864–1866	Succeeded by William Rainey Marshall
