= Ara Bartlett =

American judge

Ara Bartlett (1825 – 1883) was an American lawyer and judge who was the second Chief Justice of the Supreme Court of the Dakota Territory.

== Biography ==
Bartlett waa born in Bethany, Pennsylvania in 1825.

Bartlett moved to Kankakee, Illinois in 1853, the second lawyer to set up practice there. By 1858, he was serving as the police magistrate in Kankakee. He was elected judge of Kankakee County in 1861, serving until he was appointed an associate justice of the Dakota Territory Supreme Court by president Abraham Lincoln in June 1864. In 1865 he was appointed Chief Justice by Lincoln. After his term expired, Bartlett practiced law for a time and then moved to Kansas; in 1880 he was living in the town of Wellington.

Bartlett married Lucinda Jane Eldred (1832–1871) on December 8, 1856; she was the daughter of Nathanial Eldred, a prominent Pennsylvania judge and politician. Her sister Mary Eldred married judge and politician Edward O. Hamlin. Bartlett's daughter Mary Hamlin Bartlett (1858–1896) married Joseph Adams Smith, who became Paymaster General of the Navy and notable lecturer on naval history.

He died at Harper, Kansas on November 17, 1883.
