= Indeed Brewing Company =

Coordinates: 45.003566°N 93.251381°W

- Interactive map of Indeed Brewing Company
- Type: Private
- Location: 711 15th Avenue NE, Minneapolis, Minnesota, United States
- Opened: 2012
- Key people: Nathan Berndt, Thomas Whisenand, Rachel Anderson (founders)
- Annual production volume: 11,500 US beer barrels (13,500 hL)
- Employees: 50
- Distribution: MN, ND
- Website: indeedbrewing.com

Indeed Brewing Company is a microbrewery located in the Logan Park neighborhood of Northeast Minneapolis. It was founded in 2011 by friends Thomas Whisenand, Rachel Anderson, and Nathan Berndt.

In August 2012, Indeed's taproom officially opened to the public and it began distributing kegged beer to bars and restaurants. In October 2012 they began canning and distributing their two flagship beers, Day Tripper American Pale Ale and Midnight Ryder American Black Ale, to liquor stores throughout the Minneapolis-St. Paul area. Indeed was one of 13 breweries to open in Minnesota in 2012 after a legislative bill allowed the creation of taprooms for breweries to sell beer on-site. It was the first brewery in the state to open which planned to feature a taproom to sell on-site beer from the start of operations.

In November 2018, the brewery announced plans to expand to Milwaukee. A brewery and taproom in the city's Walker's Point neighborhood opened in September 2019.

== History and milestones ==
In July 2013, a $250,000 ($345,536 in 2025 dollars) expansion was announced with the aim of doubling the brewery's capacity to 6,400bbl per year. In August 2013, Indeed reported it was on track to brew over 6,000bbl by the end of 2013 and that its beers were now available in over 300 bars, restaurants and liquor stores throughout the Twin Cities metro area. The brewery further expanded its distribution to outstate Minnesota in 2014.

The brewery won a silver medal for their Mexican Honey Imperial Lager at the 2014 Great American Beer Festival. In late 2014 they also revealed the first of a series of wood-aged sour beers they had developed at a separate facility near their brewery.

Indeed expanded its offerings in 2020 creating Quincy's Corner in Northeastern Minneapolis (named after the intersection of Quincy St & 15th Avenue NE). This was an extension to their taproom that offered various sundries and vinyl collections for sale.
