= Big Wood Brewery =

Brewery and taproom in White Big Lake, Minnesota

- Type: Private
- Industry: Brewery
- Headquarters: White Bear Lake, Minnesota, United States
- Products: Craft beer
- Owners: Jason Medvec
- Website: bigwoodbrewery.com/Big_Wood_Brewery/Minnesota_Craft_Beer___www.bigwoodbrewery___HOME.html

Big Wood Brewery is a brewery and taproom located in White Bear Lake, Minnesota, in the Minneapolis-St. Paul area. The company began in some empty warehouse space in Vadnais Heights in 2009, before moving into their newly built brewery in 2012.

== History ==
In 2009, Steve Merila began to brew beer in some of the empty warehouse space which his wood flooring distribution business was not using. The original intent was to serve the beer at wood flooring seminars Merila held. Additionally, he began to offer beer to customers at his store. There was a bookshelf in his office which rotated out of the wall, revealing a small lounge with a couch and a bar. Jason Medvec joined Merila during Minnesota's "Winterfest" in February 2011. As the beer began to develop a following, it was decided to start their own brewery, called Big Wood Brewery due to their history in the wood flooring industry. Slightly later in 2011, they hired their first professional brewer, Ty McBee. Their first official beer was a stout, "Morning Wood", which won "best beer" at the regional Autumn Beer Review (which it won again in 2012). Their two biggest sellers are "Jack Savage" (an American Pale Ale) and "Bad Axe" (a seasonal Imperial IPA). Other beers include "Wicked Ex" (another IPA), Weissenheimer" (a wheat ale), and "Bark Bite" (IPA). In 2012 the brewery was named "#1 Minnesota Brewery at the St. Paul Summer Beer Fest. When they began looking for a location to expand their operations and move it out of the warehouse space, the decision was to move to White Bear Lake, where they would be the only local brewery. They selected a century old building in which to house their brewing operations, as well as open a taproom.

In 2013 Big Wood began to offer four of its products – Jack Savage, Morning Wood, Bark Bite, and Bad Axe - in 16 ounce aluminum cans, as a way to expand their market. The brewery moved from its warehouse location to its current address in White Bear Lake at the beginning of 2013. In February 2014, the brewery opened their taproom to the public, and along with dozens of other local breweries, they are part of a campaign by both Explore Minnesota (the Minnesota Department of Tourism) and the Minnesota Craft Brewers Guild to promote, "brewcations", which highlight tours of those breweries. The taproom was constructed using materials recovered from historic area buildings and barns, as well as from trees downed in storms. In 2016 the brewery began a "Taproom Series" of craft beers, where they release a previously taproom-only beer every three months, in both bottles and kegs. The premier offering in the series was "FINE!", an IPA.

In 2017, their "Chocolate Chip Cookie Beer" was selected as one of the craft beers to be served at the Minnesota State Fair. The brewery's beers and ales can be found in bars and liquor stores throughout Minnesota and eastern Wisconsin.
