= Alexander Ramsey House =

Historic house in Minnesota, United States

- U.S. National Register of Historic Places
- U.S. Historic district – Contributing property
- Minnesota State Register of Historic Places
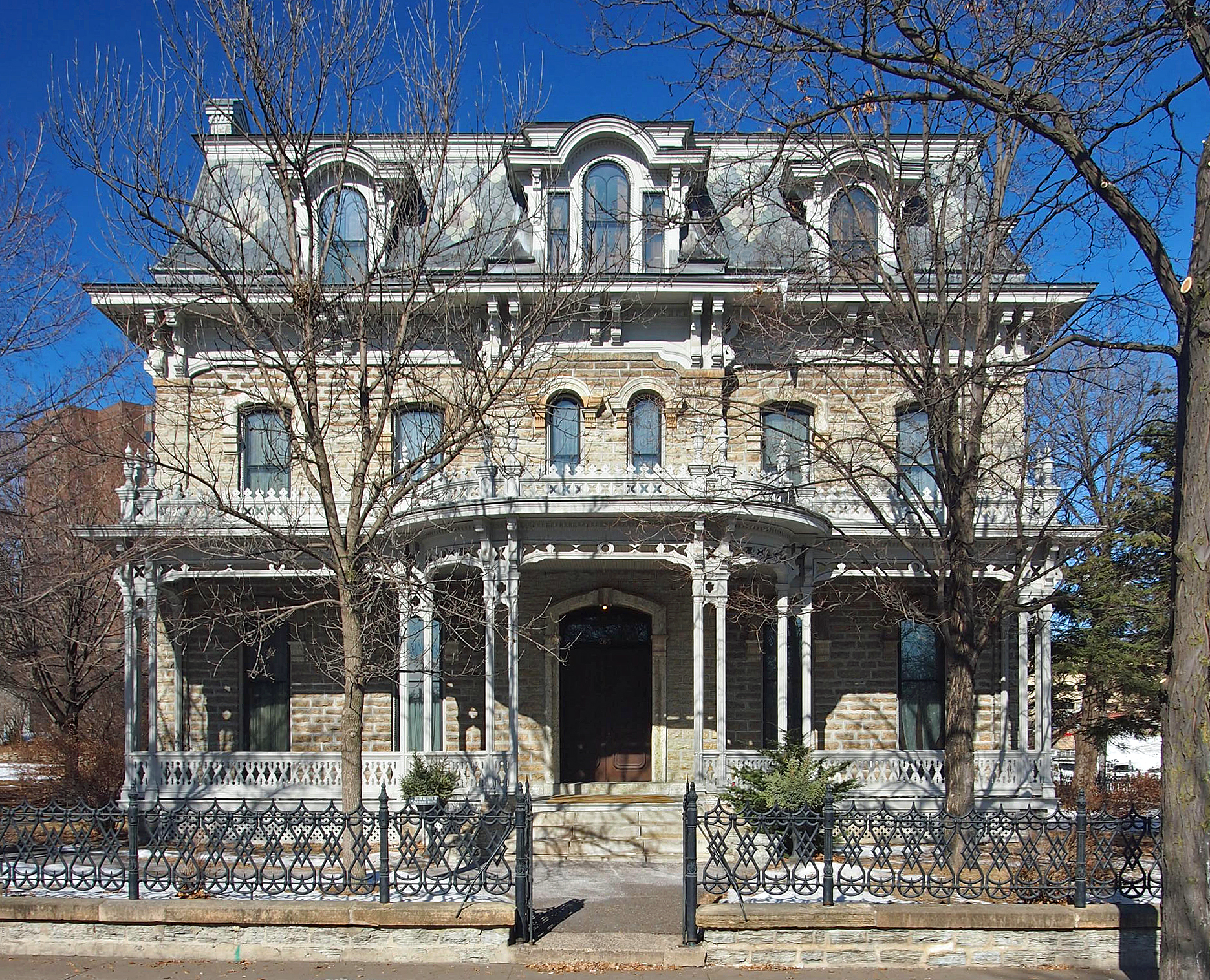
- The Alexander Ramsey House from the southeast

- Location within Minnesota Location within the United States
- Interactive map showing the location of Alexander Ramsey House
- Location: 265 Exchange Street South; Saint Paul, Minnesota
- Coordinates: 44°56′30″N 93°6′16″W
- Built: 1868
- Architect: Monroe Sheire, John Summers
- Architectural style: Second Empire
- Part of: Irvine Park Historic District (ID73000993)
- NRHP reference No.: 69000077
- Added to NRHP: November 25, 1969

The Alexander Ramsey House is a historic house museum in Saint Paul, Minnesota, United States; the former residence of Alexander Ramsey, who served as the first governor of Minnesota Territory and the second governor of the state of Minnesota. It was listed on the National Register of Historic Places in 1969. It is also a contributing property to the Irvine Park Historic District.

It is located at 265 Exchange Street South in the Irvine Park area, which was one of the first trendy neighborhoods in Minnesota. Designed by noted early Minnesota architect Monroe Sheire, the house is one of the nation's best-preserved Victorian homes, featuring carved walnut woodwork, marble fireplaces, crystal chandeliers, and many original furnishings.

The Ramsey family began building the house in 1868, including innovations like hot water radiators, gas lights and hot and cold running water, and when it was completed in 1872, the total cost of construction was nearly $41,000. To furnish the house, Ramsey's wife Anna filled two boxcars with fashionable and expensive Renaissance-revival furniture from the A.T. Stewart Company Store in New York to bring home to Minnesota.

The Ramseys' daughter Marion married Charles Furness in a lavish wedding in the parlor in 1875.

The 15-room house remained in the Ramsey family until the death of Alexander Ramsey's last surviving granddaughter Anita in 1964. The house and its contents were left to the Minnesota Historical Society, which now operates it as a museum with tours offered year-round. They offer special programs such as "A Victorian Christmas at the Ramsey House" in which the house is decorated for the holidays and visitors can discover how the Ramseys would have prepared for and celebrated Christmas. Tours show the dining table set with the family's china and crystal, with a Christmas tree decorated with the family's own ornaments.

== Gallery ==
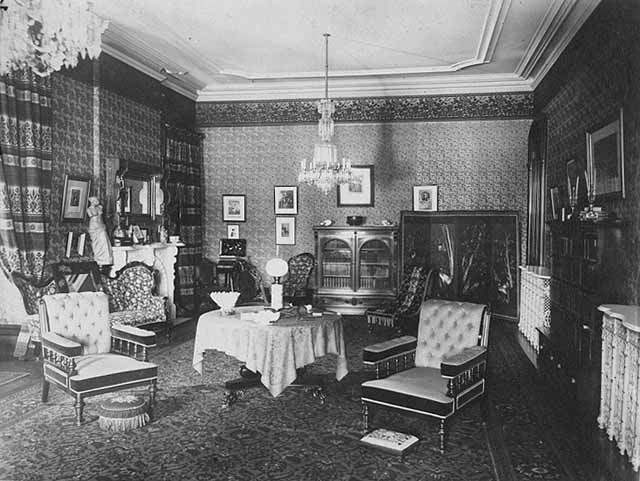
Ramsey House large parlor ca. 1884

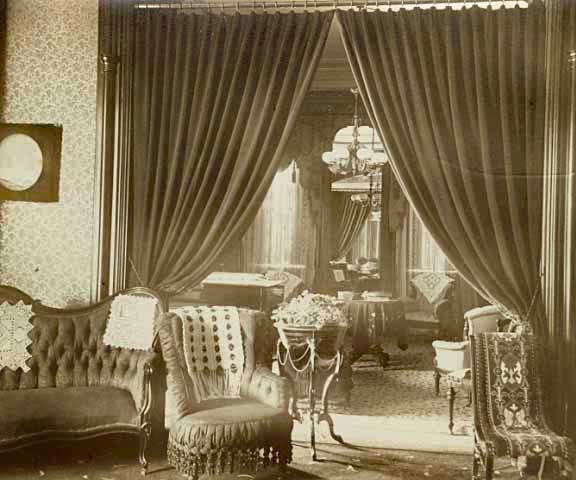
Ramsey House reception room ca. 1884
