= Henry Adoniram Swift =

American politician (1823–1869)

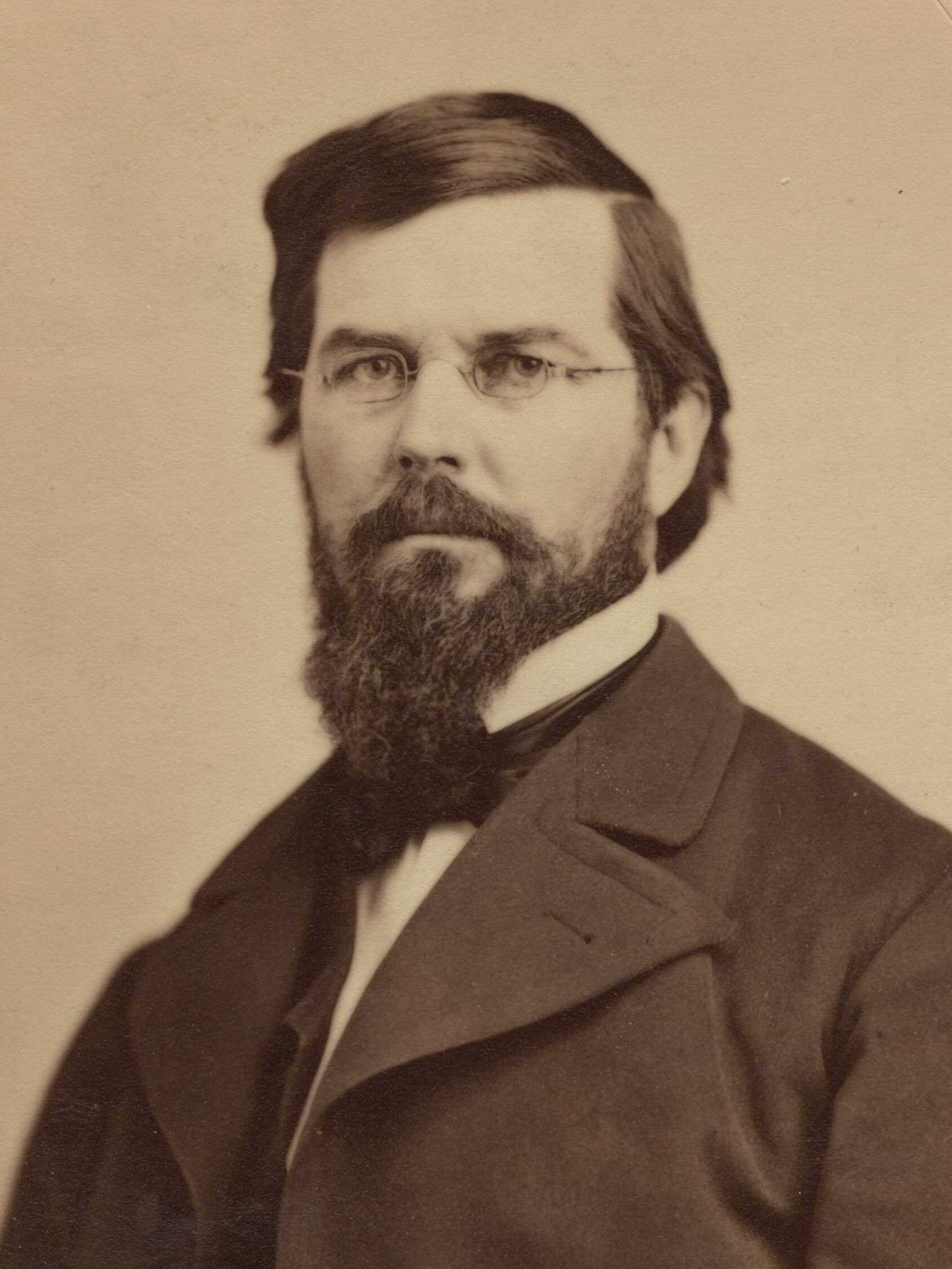

3rd Governor of Minnesota
- In office July 10, 1863 – January 11, 1864
- Lieutenant: Vacant
- Preceded by: Alexander Ramsey
- Succeeded by: Stephen Miller

3rd Lieutenant Governor of Minnesota
- In office March 4, 1863 – July 10, 1863
- Governor: Alexander Ramsey
- Preceded by: Ignatius L. Donnelly
- Succeeded by: Charles D. Sherwood

Member of the Minnesota Senate from the 19th district
- In office 1862-1865
- Preceded by: James W. Lynd
- Succeeded by: Charles T. Brown

Personal details
- Born: March 23, 1823 Ravenna, Ohio, U.S.
- Died: February 25, 1869 (aged 45) St. Peter, Minnesota, U.S.
- Party: Republican
- Spouse: Ruth Livingston
- Profession: lawyer, businessperson, abolitionist

Henry Adoniram Swift (March 23, 1823 – February 25, 1869) was an American politician who was the third governor of Minnesota following the resignation of Alexander Ramsey. He would hold the record of the shortest serving governor of Minnesota, serving for only 188 days, until his record was broken by Hjalmar Petersen in 1937. Swift was a Republican.

== Career ==
Described by peers as gentle, self-effacing, and ambivalent toward politics, Henry Swift was Minnesota's third governor for less than a year, completing the second term of Alexander Ramsey, who had been elected United States Senator. With little time or apparent inclination to effect major change, this un-elected governor concentrated on assuring the welfare of Civil War veterans.

After graduation with honors from Western Reserve College in his native Ohio, Swift tutored the children of a slave owner in Mississippi, an experience that reinforced his commitment to abolitionism. He returned to Ohio, earned a law degree, and began a career in business and government service.

He and his family journeyed to Minnesota in 1853, settling first in St. Paul then St. Peter. With his partners in the St. Peter Land Company, he campaigned, unsuccessfully, to relocate the state capital in their burgeoning Minnesota River town. Swift left his commercial enterprises in 1861 for a state senate seat that propelled him into the lieutenant governorship.

He served as governor from July 10, 1863 to January 11, 1864 after serving as the third Lieutenant Governor of Minnesota when Governor Alexander Ramsey resigned to enter the United States Congress. He served as governor between the resignation of Ramsey and the inauguration of Stephen Miller. While governor, Swift organized the recruitment of new troops for the Civil War. Swift initially intended on running for a term in his own right, but withdrew from the race. He chose to run for State Senate instead.

After being governor, Swift two more terms in the state senate. He was elected with a margin of only six votes. In 1865, he was a reluctant candidate for the U.S. Senate. "I shall be ten times happier with my family in St. Peter than as Senator at Washington," he declared characteristically upon learning he had lost the Republican senatorial nomination. Four years later, he succumbed to typhoid fever at age 45.

Swift County, Minnesota was named after him in 1870.

Political offices
Preceded by Ignatius L. Donnelly	Lieutenant Governor of Minnesota; 1863–1863	Succeeded by Charles D. Sherwood
Preceded by Alexander Ramsey	Governor of Minnesota; 1863–1864	Succeeded by Stephen Miller
