= Alexander Ramsey =

American politician (1815–1903)

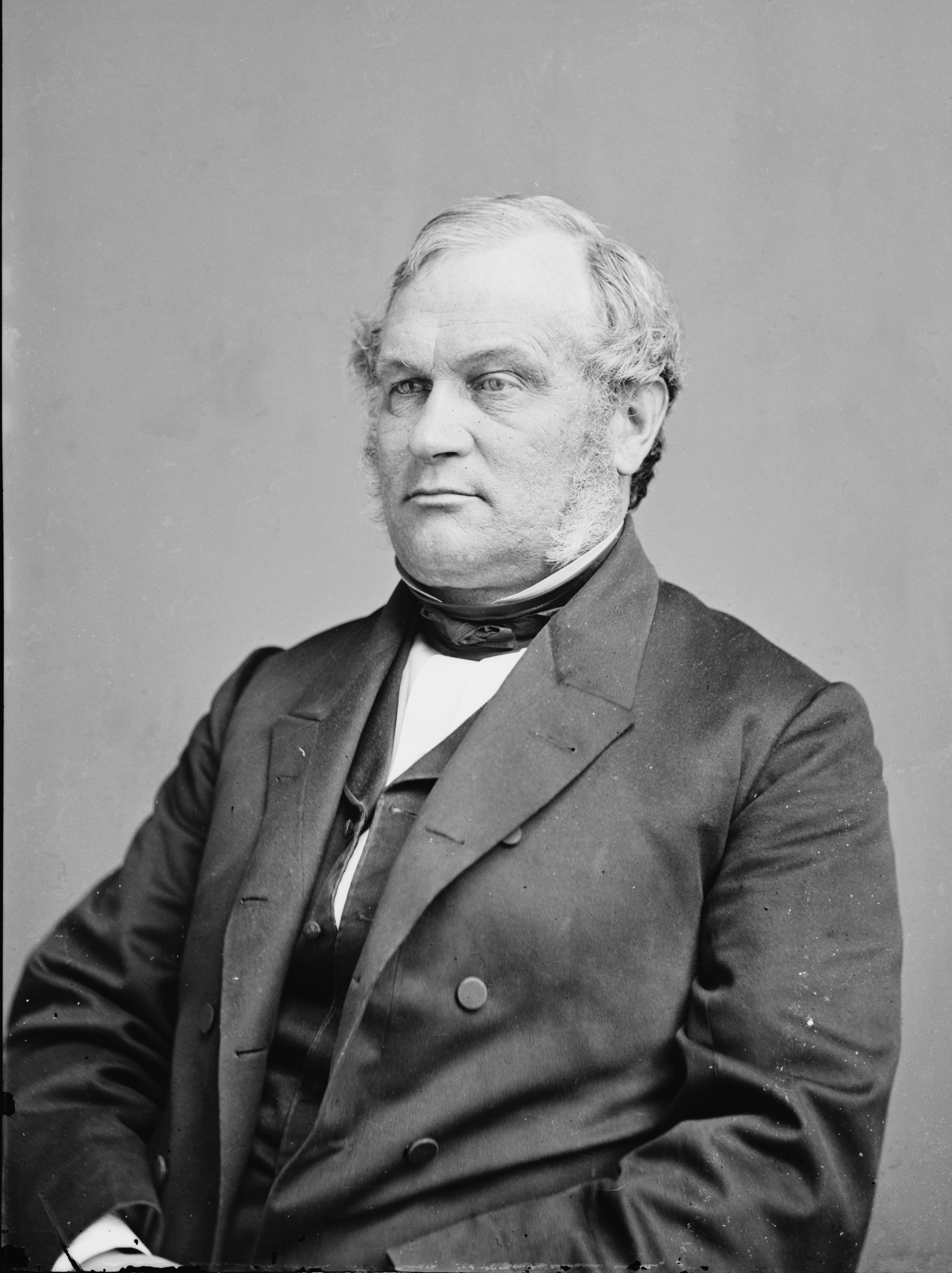
- Ramsey, 1855–1865

34th United States Secretary of War
- In office December 10, 1879 – March 5, 1881
- President: Rutherford B. Hayes
- Preceded by: George W. McCrary
- Succeeded by: Robert Lincoln

United States Senator from Minnesota
- In office March 4, 1863 – March 3, 1875
- Preceded by: Henry Rice
- Succeeded by: Samuel J. R. McMillan

2nd Governor of Minnesota
- In office January 2, 1860 – July 10, 1863
- Preceded by: Henry Sibley
- Succeeded by: Henry Swift

5th Mayor of Saint Paul
- In office 1855–1856
- Preceded by: David Olmsted
- Succeeded by: George Becker

1st Governor of Minnesota Territory
- In office June 1, 1849 – May 15, 1853
- Appointed by: Zachary Taylor
- Succeeded by: Willis A. Gorman

Member of the U.S. House of Representatives from Pennsylvania's 14th district
- In office March 4, 1843 – March 3, 1847
- Preceded by: James Irvin
- Succeeded by: George Eckert

Personal details
- Born: September 8, 1815 Hummelstown, Pennsylvania, U.S.
- Died: April 22, 1903 (aged 87) Saint Paul, Minnesota, U.S.
- Resting place: Oakland Cemetery, Saint Paul, Minnesota
- Party: Whig (before 1857); Republican (1857–1903)
- Spouse: Anna Jenks (m. 1844)
- Children: 3
- Education: Lafayette College; Dickinson School of Law

Alexander Ramsey (September 8, 1815 – April 22, 1903) was an American politician who was the first Minnesota Territorial governor and later a U.S. Senator. He served as a Whig and Republican in a variety of offices between the 1840s and the 1880s.

== Early years and family ==
Born in Hummelstown, Pennsylvania, on September 8, 1815, Ramsey was the eldest of five children born to Thomas Ramsey and Elizabeth Kelker (also Kölliker or Köllker). Ramsey was of Scottish and German ancestry. His father was a blacksmith who committed suicide, at age 42, when he went bankrupt in 1826 after signing for a note of a friend. Ramsey lived with his uncle in Harrisburg after his family split up to live with relatives. His brother Justus Cornelius Ramsey served in the Minnesota Territorial Legislature.

Ramsey first studied carpentry at Lafayette College but left during his third year. He studied law with Hamilton Alricks, and attended Judge John Reed's law school in Carlisle (now Penn State-Dickinson Law) in 1839. He was admitted to the Pennsylvania bar in 1839. In 1844, Ramsey married Anna Earl Jenks, daughter of Michael Hutchinson Jenks, and they had three children. Only one, Marion, survived past childhood.

== Career ==
Alexander Ramsey was elected from Pennsylvania as a Whig to the U.S. House of Representatives and served in the 28th and 29th congresses from March 4, 1843, to March 3, 1847. He served as the first Territorial governor of Minnesota from June 1, 1849, to May 15, 1853, as a member of the Whig Party. Upon his term's completion, he said he would not run for public office again, but in 1855, he was elected mayor of St. Paul, Minnesota. He served in that position for a one-year term. In 1857, Ramsey joined the newly formed Republican Party. When the Republican State Convention unanimously nominated him for governor of Minnesota on September 10, 1857, he was convinced to leave retirement and accepted the nomination. He lost the election to Henry Hastings Sibley by 240 votes.

=== Governor of Minnesota ===
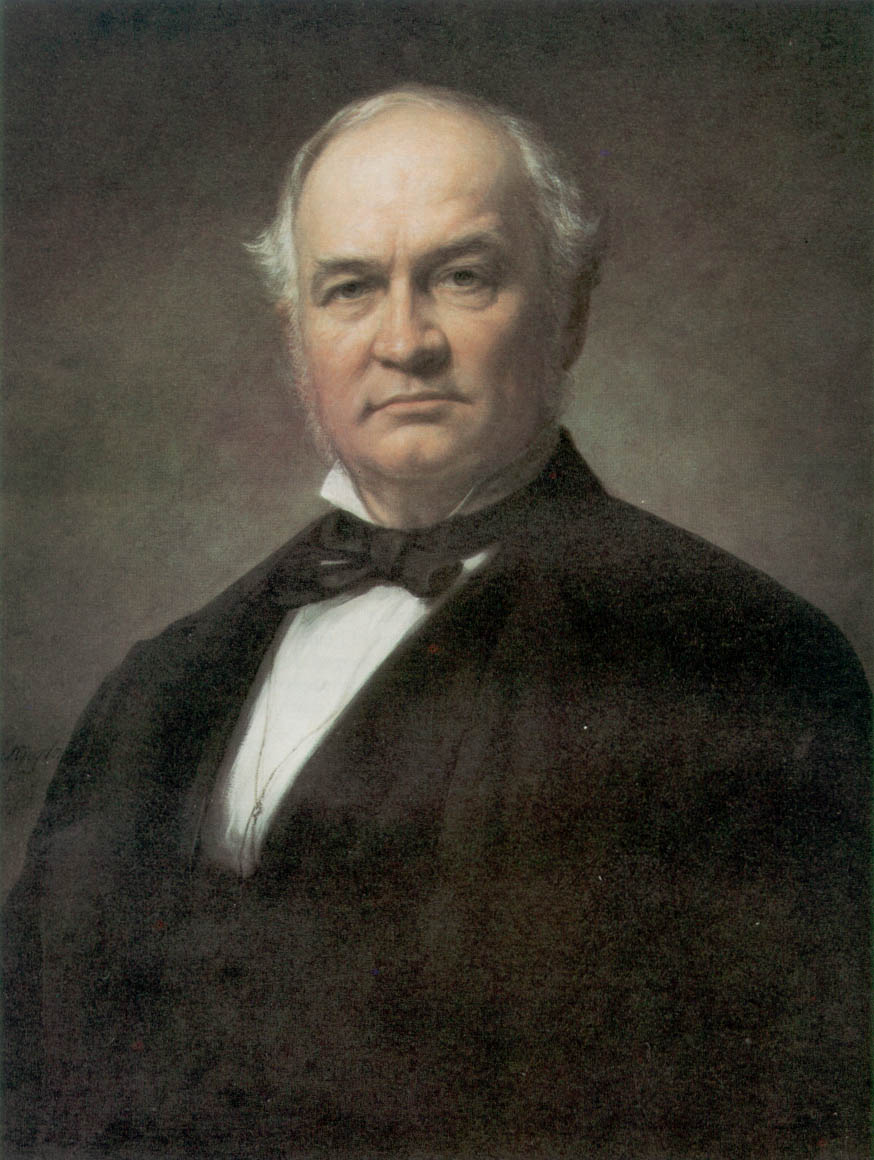
Portrait of Ramsey as Governor

Ramsey became the second governor of Minnesota after statehood in 1860, defeating George Loomis Becker in the 1859 election. He served from January 2, 1860, to July 10, 1863. Ramsey is credited as the first Union governor to commit troops during the American Civil War. He happened to be in Washington, D.C., when fighting broke out. When he heard about the attack on Fort Sumter he went to the White House and offered President Abraham Lincoln Minnesota's services. On April 17, 1861, Ramsey promised at least 1,000 Minnesotan men to the Union Army.

==== U.S.-Dakota War ====
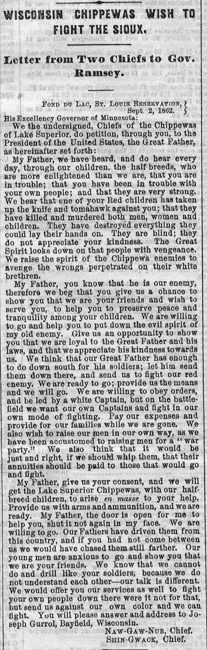
(Fond du Lac Band of Lake Superior Chippewa reservation archives)

Ramsey called for the killing or removal of the Mdewakanton and Wahpekute Dakota from Minnesota during the Dakota War of 1862. After pressing the Dakota to sell their land, he and other officials stole from the Dakota's annuities. In response, some Dakota attacked American settlements, resulting in the death of at least 800 civilian men, women and children and the displacement of thousands more. When the Fond du Lac band of Chippewa learned of the uprising they sent Ramsey a letter, dated September 6, 1862, to forward to Lincoln offering to fight the Sioux.

On September 9, Ramsey told the state legislature, "The Sioux Indians of Minnesota must be exterminated or driven forever beyond the borders of the State", which he justified by citing various outrages against the settlers and violations of their treaties. In the north the Chippewa/Ojibwe's Indian agent was stealing from them. Ramsey led a legislative commission to the Crow Wing agency to address its issues. There, 10 chiefs of the Leech Lake and Mississippi bands laid out their concerns and offered to fight the Sioux for the government. The commission liked their offer, and Ramsey invited the leaders of 22 bands of Ojibwe to St. Paul. They came on September 23, believing their offer had been accepted and waving the US flag. Ramsey told them that Major General Pope would not accept their service on the grounds that it would not be good public policy, but that they would be contacted if needed. In 1863, in response to continued raids on settlers, he authorized a bounty for the scalps of Dakota men.

In January 1863, Ramsey was elected to the US Senate. He remained governor until it was announced that Republican Stephen Miller had won the 1863 Minnesota gubernatorial election. Ramsey resigned the next day, leaving Lieutenant Governor Henry Adoniram Swift to serve as acting governor until Miller's inauguration.

=== Senator ===
Ramsey resigned as governor to become a US Senator, having been elected to that post in 1863 as a Republican. The election was contentious, taking multiple ballots for him to secure a majority. He was reelected in 1869 and held the office until March 3, 1875, serving in the 38th, 39th, 40th, 41st, 42nd, and 43rd congresses. He supported the Radical Republicans, who called for vigorous prosecution of the Civil War and a military reconstruction of the South.

On April 14, 1865, President Lincoln was assassinated. He died the next morning. Very few senior officials were in D.C. that morning, but Ramsey was, and he took part in transferring the presidency to Vice President Andrew Johnson. He later voted to impeach Johnson.

=== Later career ===
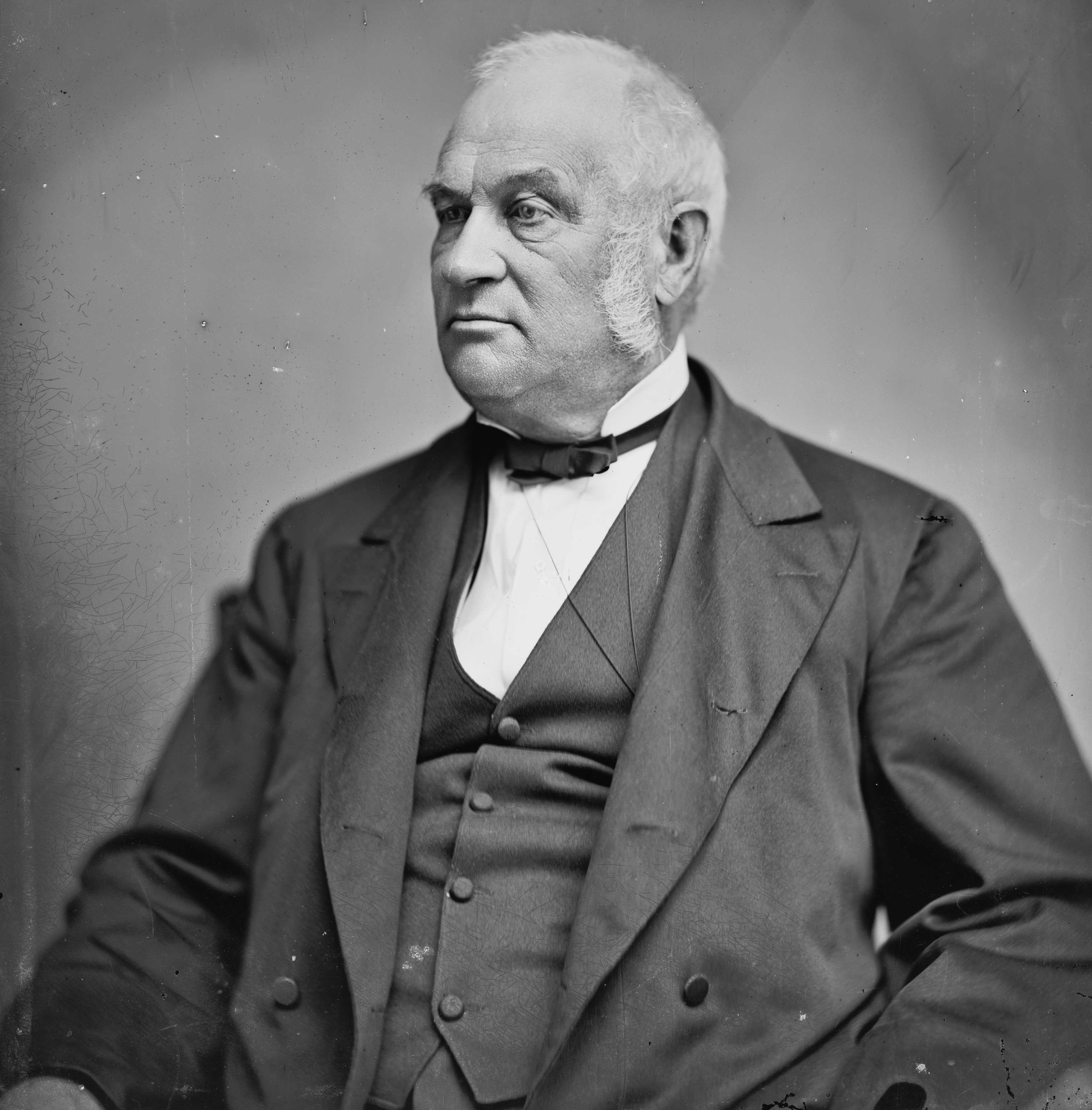
Ramsey as Secretary of War

Ramsey served as Secretary of War from 1879 to 1881, under President Rutherford B. Hayes. As War Secretary, he investigated the assault of a black West Point cadet, Johnson Whittaker. He worked to improve West Point's policies. He encouraged the army to pursue the Apache under Chief Victorio. He was one of the commissioners to govern Utah from 1882 to 1886 under the Edmunds Act. The act made it illegal for polygamists to vote or hold office. Ramsey and four others were defendants in the Supreme Court case Murphy v. Ramsey, 114 U.S. 15 (1885). The Supreme Court upheld the federal law that denied polygamists the right to vote.

In 1885, Ramsey escorted the son of Ojibwe Chief Hole in the Day to Washington D.C. as Minnesota's candidate to West Point. Also in 1885, he was elected as a 3rd Class (honorary) Companion of the Military Order of the Loyal Legion of the United States in recognition of his support for the Union during the American Civil War.

Ramsey died in St. Paul in 1903, aged 87.

== Legacy ==
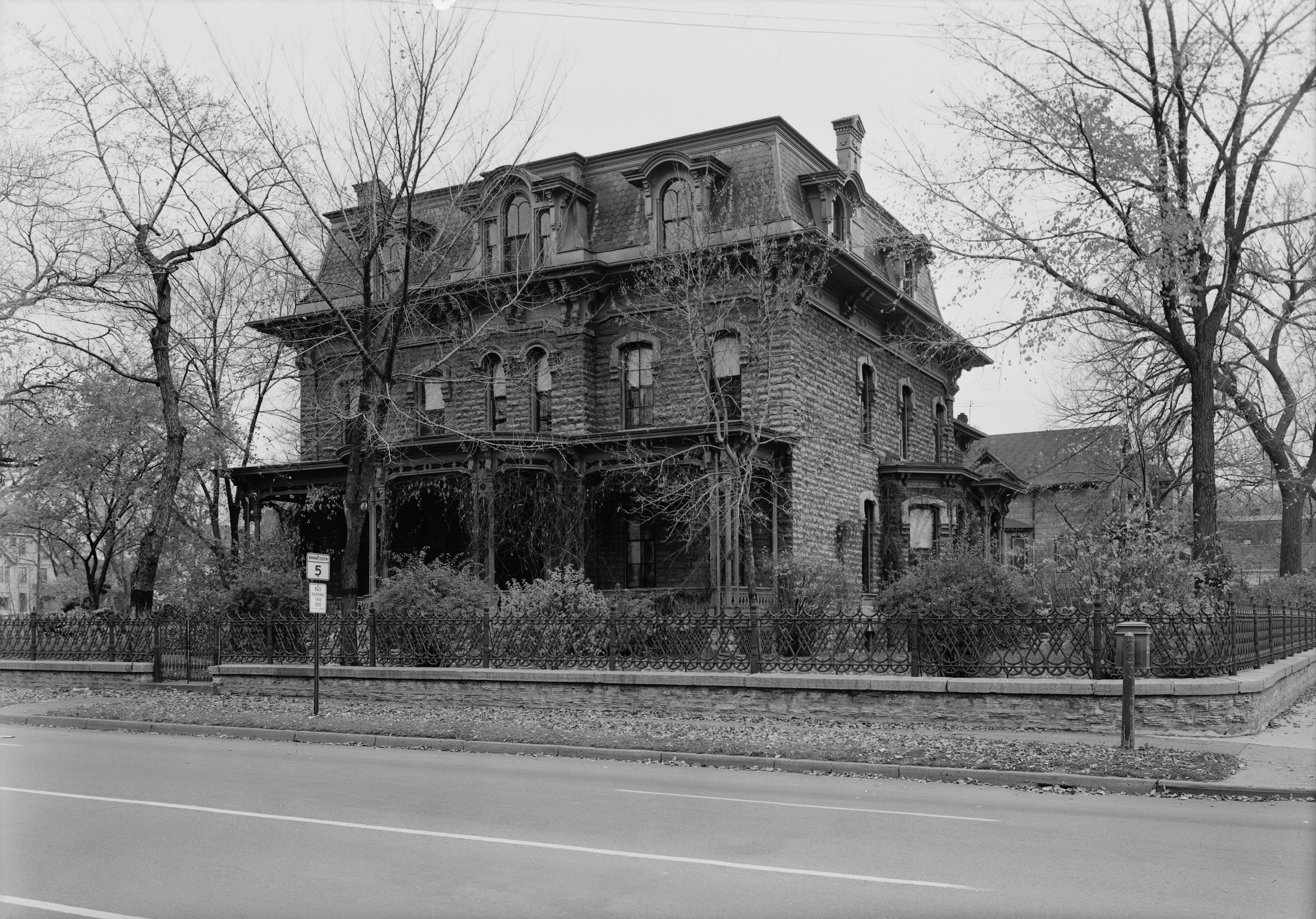
Ramsey's house in Saint Paul, Minnesota, 1960

The Minnesota Historical Society preserves his home, the Alexander Ramsey House, as a museum. It was added to the National Register of Historic Places in 1969. Counties, towns, parks, and schools named after Ramsey include:

- Ramsey County, Minnesota
- Ramsey County, North Dakota
- The city of Ramsey, Minnesota
- The city of Ramsey, Illinois
- Alexander Ramsey Park in Redwood Falls, Minnesota. Formerly a state park, it is Minnesota's largest municipal park. The adjacent street is Ramsey Street.
- Ramsey Park in Stillwater, Minnesota
- Hidden River Middle School in Saint Paul, Minnesota, was formerly named after him. During the 2021–2022 school year, the school was renamed after approval from the St. Paul School Board; staff and students had previously called for a name change in the spring of 2021.
- Alexander Ramsey Elementary School in Montevideo, Minnesota
- Justice Page Middle School in Minneapolis, Minnesota, was named after Ramsey when it was founded in 1932, first as Alexander Ramsey Junior High School and later Ramsey International Fine Arts Center. In the 2016–17 school year, a student-initiated effort to rename Ramsey Middle School resulted in naming the school after Alan Page, the first African-American Minnesota Supreme Court justice.
- Liberty Ship SS Alexander Ramsey, launched in 1942.
- Ramsey Street in Brownsville, Minnesota, Faribault, Minnesota, St. Paul, Minnesota, St. Peter, Minnesota, Mankato, Minnesota, and Caledonia, Minnesota.
- Ramsey Avenue in Litchfield, Minnesota, and Atwater, Minnesota.

U.S. House of Representatives
Preceded by James Irvin	Member of the U.S. House of Representatives from Pennsylvania's 14th congressional district 1843–1847	Succeeded by George Eckert
Political offices
New office	Governor of Minnesota; 1849–1853	Succeeded by Willis A. Gorman
Preceded by David Olmsted	Mayor of Saint Paul; 1855–1856	Succeeded by George Becker
Preceded by Henry Sibley	Governor of Minnesota; 1860–1863	Succeeded by Henry Swift
Preceded by George W. McCrary	United States Secretary of War; 1879–1881	Succeeded by Robert Lincoln
Party political offices
First	Republican nominee for Governor of Minnesota; 1857, 1859, 1861	Succeeded by Stephen Miller
U.S. Senate
Preceded by Henry Rice	U.S. Senator (Class 1) from Minnesota; 1863–1875; Served alongside: Morton S. Wilkinson, Daniel Norton, Ozora P. Stearns, William Windom	Succeeded by Samuel J. R. McMillan
