= Surly Brewing Company =

American brewery

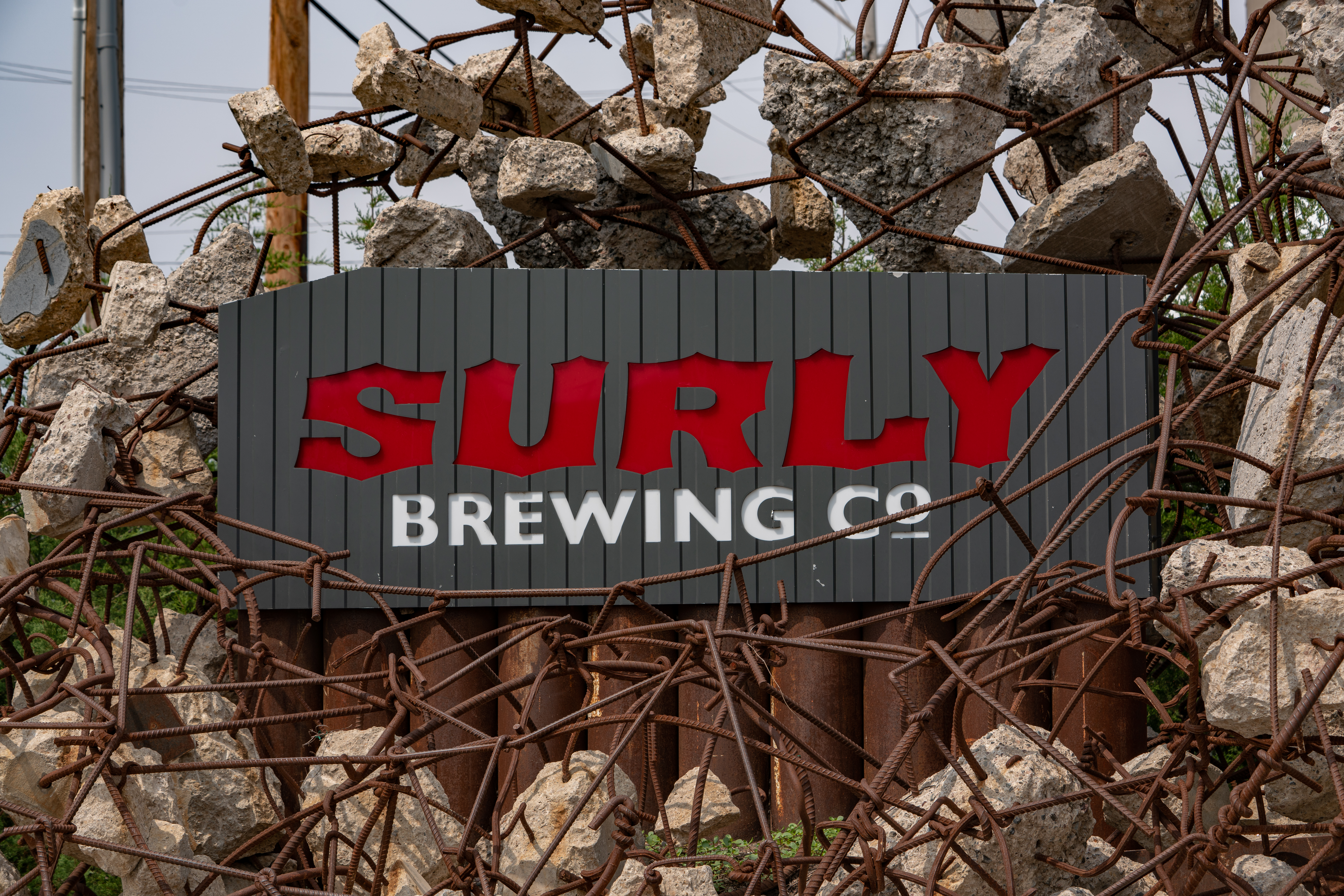
- Location: 520 Malcolm Ave SE. Minneapolis, MN 55414
- Opened: 2005
- Annual production volume: 47,757 US beer barrels (56,042 hL) in 2013.
- Owned by: Omar Ansari
- Website: surlybrewing.com

Active beers
Name	Type
Furious	India Pale Ale
Logic Bomb	Juicy Pale Ale
Hell	Lager
One Man Mosh Pit	Hazy IPA
Axe Man	India Pale Ale

Seasonal beers
Name	Type
Surly Lemonade	Lemonade Beer
Wet	Wet-Hop IPA
Abrasive	Double IPA

Other beers
Name	Type
Special Release beers
Darkness	Russian Imperial Stout
Smoke	Oak Aged Smoked Baltic Porter
Tea Bagged Furious	Dry Hopped Cask India Pale Ale
Tea Bagged Bender	Dry Hopped Cask Brown Ale
Pentagram	Wine Barrel-Aged Brett Dark Ale
One Time Release beers
Sausage Fest	Smoked Belgian
One	Imperial Lager
Two	Cranberry-Infused Dark Ale
Three	Braggot
Four	Milk / Sweet Stout
Five	Wine Barrel-Aged Brett Dark Ale
Syx	American Strong Ale
Seviin	Belgian Strong Dark Ale
Eight	American Oat Wine
Nein	Dunkelweizen
Ten	Old Ale
Eleven	Quadrupel

The Surly Brewing Company is an American craft brewery with facilities in Minneapolis and Brooklyn Center, Minnesota, and initially stood out for primarily canning beers, rather than bottling. Initially available only in and around the Minneapolis–Saint Paul metropolitan area, the company expanded distribution to include all of Minnesota and at least 12 states and several international markets. During the early 2010s, Surly experienced rapid growth, with production of 21,000 barrels in 2012, 28,000 barrels in 2013, and 47,757 barrels in 2015. Surly's brewing system in Brooklyn Center is a 30 beer barrel (BBL) Sprinkman, one of four identical systems produced by Sprinkman of Wisconsin. The Minneapolis location has a 100 barrel system. The beer hall in Minneapolis features many events including live music and trivia.

Despite sharing a similar name and being headquartered in the U.S. state of Minnesota, the brewing company and Surly Bikes are separate enterprises. An agreement between the two companies allows the bicycle manufacturer to display the single word "Surly" on its products.

== History ==
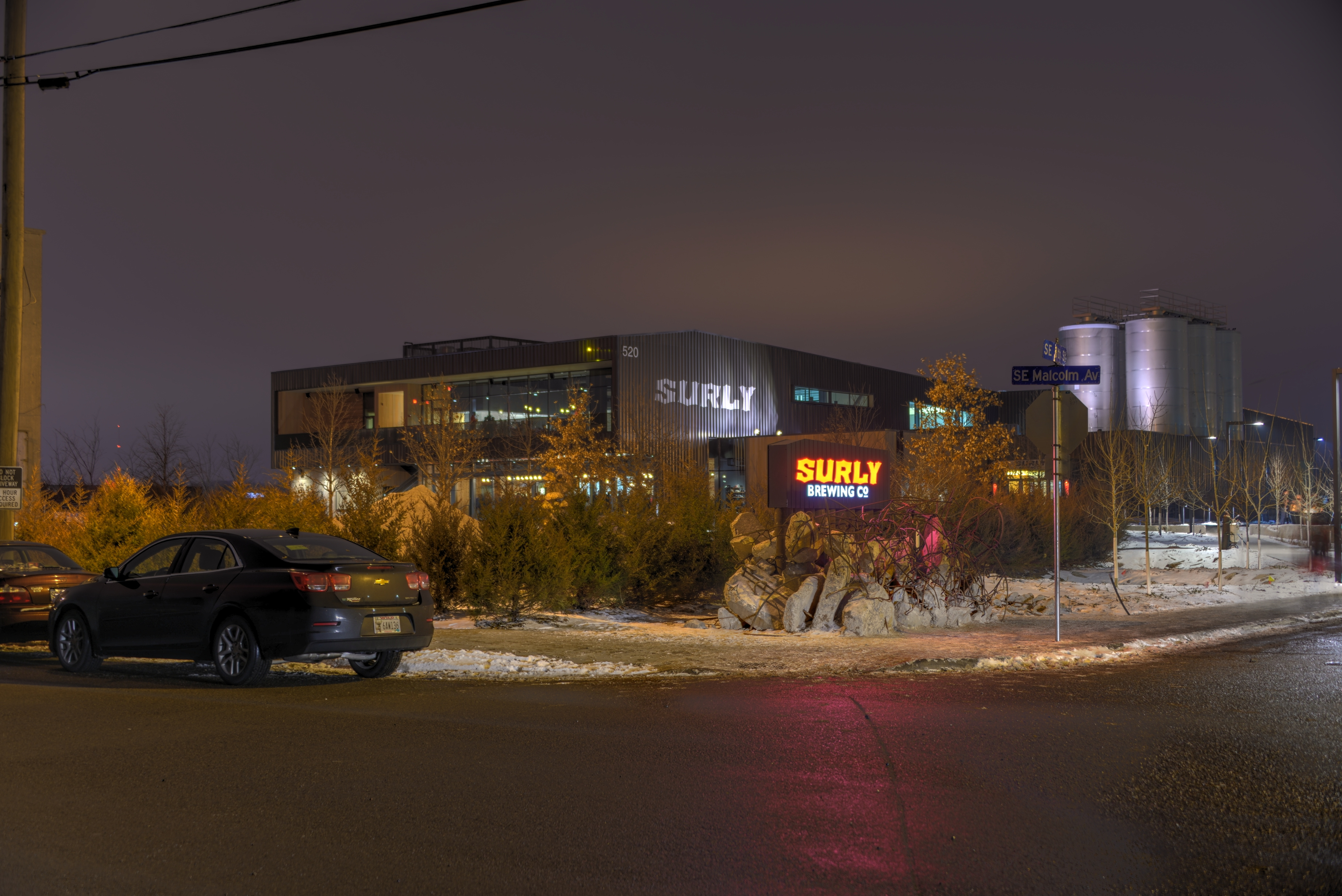
The Surly brewery event space in Minneapolis that closed temporarily in 2020.

Surly Brewing Co. founder Omar Ansari had been homebrewing since 1994. After apprenticing at New Holland Brewing Company in Michigan and enlisting Todd Haug of Minneapolis's Rock Bottom Brewery, Surly Brewing began brewing in Brooklyn Center.

In February 2011, Surly announced that it intended to open a restaurant and beer garden, which was expected to cost US$20 million. The new facility would also increase its brewing capacity to approximately 100,000 barrels. This type of installation was not in line with Minnesota's liquor laws, however. With the help of the Surly Nation, fans of the brewery's beer, some members of the Minnesota Legislature were convinced to propose changes in order to allow it. Minnesota's three-tier liquor sales system would not allow breweries to distribute their beer for retail sale and sell on the brewery's premises, as a brewpub does. After just a few months, changes to Minnesota's liquor laws that would allow Surly to sell beer for consumption at the proposed BrewPub, were passed in an omnibus liquor bill introduced by Rep. Jenifer Loon (R - Eden Prairie) and Sen. Linda Scheid (DFL - Brooklyn Park). Known as the "Surly Bill", this bill was signed into law by Governor Mark Dayton on 25 May 2011.

In 2012, Esquire magazine selected Surly Brewing Company's CynicAle 16 ounce as one of the "Best Canned Beers to Drink Now" in a February article.

Surly purchased an 8.3-acre (3.4 ha) plot of land in Prospect Park, Minneapolis for its $20 million brewery in April 2013. Surly secured $2 million in environmental mediation grants from Hennepin County to address more than a century's worth of accumulated industrial pollution at the site. Their new brewery and taproom opened in December 2014.

In 2016, Surly was featured on an episode of Diners, Drive-Ins and Dives, hosted by Guy Fieri.

In 2020, Surly announced it would layoff 150 employees and indefinitely close its 350-seat beer hall, pizzeria, events center, and retail store in Minneapolis. The company said the decision was a result of an employee contracting COVID-19 and declining revenue due to restrictions during the COVID-19 pandemic. The company said sales at its on-site location were down 82% from the prior year, and it was no longer profitable. However, the announcement of it came just days after employees announced their intention to unionize under Unite Here Local 17 that represents restaurant and hospitality workers. Some labor leaders felt the move by Surly was retaliatory and filed unfair labor practice charges. The vote to form a union failed by one vote in October 2020. It reopened in June of 2021.

In 2025, the company announced it would open its first out-of-state taproom and restaurant in Grand Forks, North Dakota, through a partnership with Short or Tall Eatery and Drink Hall. The new venue, situated near the University of North Dakota campus, will feature a 7,000-square-foot restaurant space with an outdoor patio and offer New Haven-style pizza.

== Distribution ==
For the first several years Surly was only available in the Minneapolis-St. Paul area due to limited supply. An initial expansion to Chicago was reversed in June 2010 to ensure they could reliably serve the brewery's home market. In November 2013, Surly re-entered the Chicago market, being offered at over one hundred different bars, restaurants, and liquor stores in the Chicago metropolitan area. This expansion included canned and kegged Surly Cynic, Hell, Bender, Overrated, and Coffee Bender, with some Chicago liquor stores carrying select Surly specialities when available. In early 2015 Surly expanded its distribution to include Iowa and also aimed to include Wisconsin by the end of the same year.

The brewery has since continued to grow the geographical area it serves. In May 2016, Surly launched distribution in North Dakota, South Dakota, and Nebraska, responding to longstanding demand from fans in those states. Initially, popular beers such as Furious, Hell, and Overrated were offered on draft, while a variety of other core products were made available in cans. Surly now distributes its beers in 13 states, primarily in the Midwest, including Minnesota, Wisconsin, Iowa, North Dakota, South Dakota, Illinois, Michigan, Missouri, Nebraska, Colorado, Kansas, Texas, and Arizona.

== See also ==
- Barrel-aged beer
