= 1890 Minnesota gubernatorial election =

- November 4, 1890
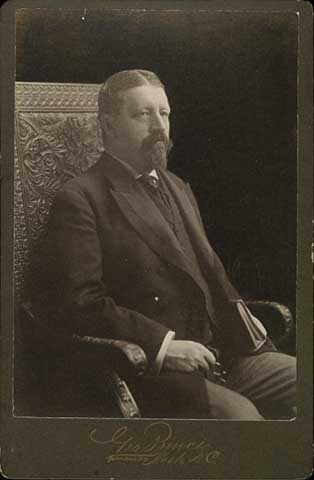

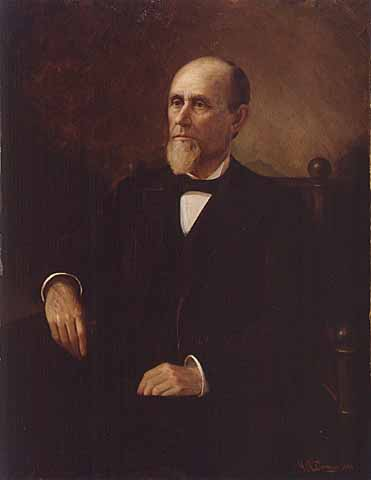

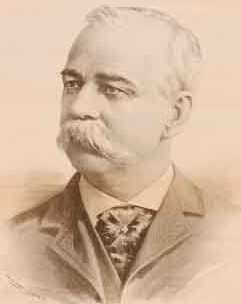
Nominee	William Rush Merriam	Thomas Wilson	Sidney M. Owen
Party	Republican	Democratic	Alliance
Popular vote	88,111	85,844	58,513
Percentage	36.58%	35.63%	24.29%
- County results Lee: 30−40% 40−50% 50−60% 60−70% 80−90% Wilson: 30−40% 40−50% 50–60% 60–70% 70−80% Owen: 30−40% 40−50% 50−60% 60−70% 70−80%
Governor before election
William Rush Merriam
Republican
Elected Governor
William Rush Merriam
Republican

The 1890 Minnesota gubernatorial election took place on November 4, 1890. Republican Party of Minnesota incumbent William Rush Merriam defeated Democratic Party of Minnesota challenger Thomas Wilson and Farmers' Alliance candidate Sidney M. Owen.

== Candidates ==
- Sidney M. Owen, newspaper editor (Farmer's Alliance)
- William Rush Merriam, incumbent (Republican)
- James P. Pinkham, minister (Prohibition)
- Thomas Wilson, representative from Minnesota's 1st congressional district (Democrat)

== Campaigns ==
The Farmer's Alliance, a powerful force in Minnesotan politics, voted to run their own candidates in the upcoming elections. This was due to being removed from the Democratic State convention in 1886, and being defeated in the primary in 1888. The Republicans had no interest in cooperating with the Alliance. After Knute Nelson showed no interest (he chose to run for the Republican nomination), Sidney M. Owen became the nominee. The Farmer's Alliance was the first major third-party showing in Minnesotan history, and would be far from the last.

The Republican Convention, held on July 24, 1890, saw three candidates in the primary: incumbent William R. Merriam, Knute Nelson, and William W. Braden. Merriam won in a landslide, with 350 votes to Nelson's 74 and Braden's 34. Merriam's victory speech made no note of the Democrats, instead focusing on the Farmer's Alliance as the main opponent. He spent much of his speech speaking about the accomplishments of the state under the Republican party (which in practice was nearly all of the state's history to that point). He stated, "The past history of the Republican Party is a guarantee for its future actions."

The Democratic Convention saw the collapse of progressive and left-wing factions of the party, largely abandoning it in favor of the Farmer's Alliance. Delegates from Kittson County, and some from Blue Earth County, voted for Owen to be the Democratic nominee. With little further enthusiasm for a progressive from the Democratic Party, conservative Thomas Wilson was nominated with no serious opposition. However, at the convention, Wilson found himself pitted against serious competitor Robert A. Smith, the mayor of Saint Paul, Minnesota. On the day of the convention—September 10, 1890—Wilson was nominated. Wilson's campaign was harmed by his continued ties to railroad corporations, as well as his anti-union rhetoric, causing the Democratic ticket to fair extremely poorly with the labor vote.

== Results ==
1890 gubernatorial election, Minnesota
Party	Candidate	Votes	%	±%
Republican	William Rush Merriam (incumbent)	88,111	36.58%	−14.77%
Democratic	Thomas Wilson	85,844	35.63%	−6.51%
Alliance	Sidney M. Owen	58,513	24.29%	n/a
Prohibition	James P. Pinkham	8,424	3.50%	−3.01%
Majority		2,267	0.95%	
Turnout		240,892		
Republican hold		Swing		

== See also ==
- List of Minnesota gubernatorial elections
