= 1894 Minnesota gubernatorial election =

- November 6, 1894
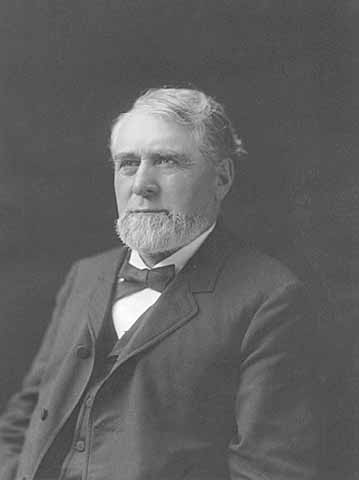

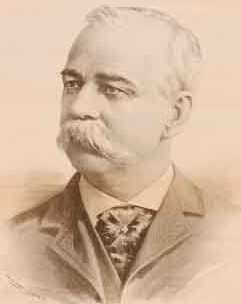

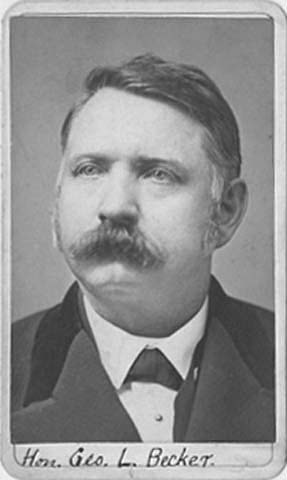
Nominee	Knute Nelson	Sidney M. Owen	George Loomis Becker
Party	Republican	Populist	Democratic
Popular vote	147,943	87,890	53,584
Percentage	49.94%	29.67%	18.09%
- County results Nelson: 30–40% 40–50% 50–60% 60–70% 70–80% Owen: 40–50% 50–60% 60–70% Becker: 40–50% 50–60%
Governor before election
Knute Nelson
Republican
Elected Governor
Knute Nelson
Republican

The 1894 Minnesota gubernatorial election took place on November 6, 1894. Republican Party of Minnesota incumbent Knute Nelson easily defeated People's Party challenger Sidney M. Owen and Democratic Party of Minnesota candidate George Loomis Becker.

All three major candidates had stood in previous elections once before: Nelson in 1892, Owen in 1890, and Becker in 1859. The largest gap between his first campaign and his campaign in 1894 was had by Becker, whose unsuccessful 1859 campaign had taken place 35 years ago. All three major candidates were also chosen unanimously in their respective primaries.

== Candidates ==
- George Loomis Becker, former state senator (Democrat)
- Hans Sjurson Hilleboe, faculty at Luther Seminary (Prohibition)
- Knute Nelson, incumbent (Republican)
- Sidney M. Owen, Farmer's Alliance nominee for governor in 1890 (Populist)

== Campaigns ==
At the Republican State Convention, held May 16, 1894, Nelson was re-nominated unanimously.

The Populist State Convention was held on July 10, 1894. Sidney M. Owen was nominated without opposition. "The Workingmen's Marseille" was sung to open the convention. Owen was nominated unanimously.

The Democratic State Convention was held on September 5, 1894. Former nominee in 1892, Daniel W. Lawler, nominated George Loomis Becker, who was greeted by the convention with great applause. With enthusiasm from the convention, Becker was nominated unanimously.

== Results ==
1894 gubernatorial election, Minnesota
Party	Candidate	Votes	%	±%
Republican	Knute Nelson (incumbent)	147,943	49.94%	+7.26%
Populist	Sidney M. Owen	87,890	29.67%	+14.09%
Democratic	George Loomis Becker	53,584	18.09%	−18.87%
Prohibition	Hans S. Hilleboe	6,832	2.31%	−2.48%
	Write-ins	11	0.00%	N/A
Majority		60,053	20.27%	
Turnout		296,260		
Republican hold		Swing		

== See also ==
- List of Minnesota gubernatorial elections
