= 1916 United States Senate election in Minnesota =

- November 7, 1916
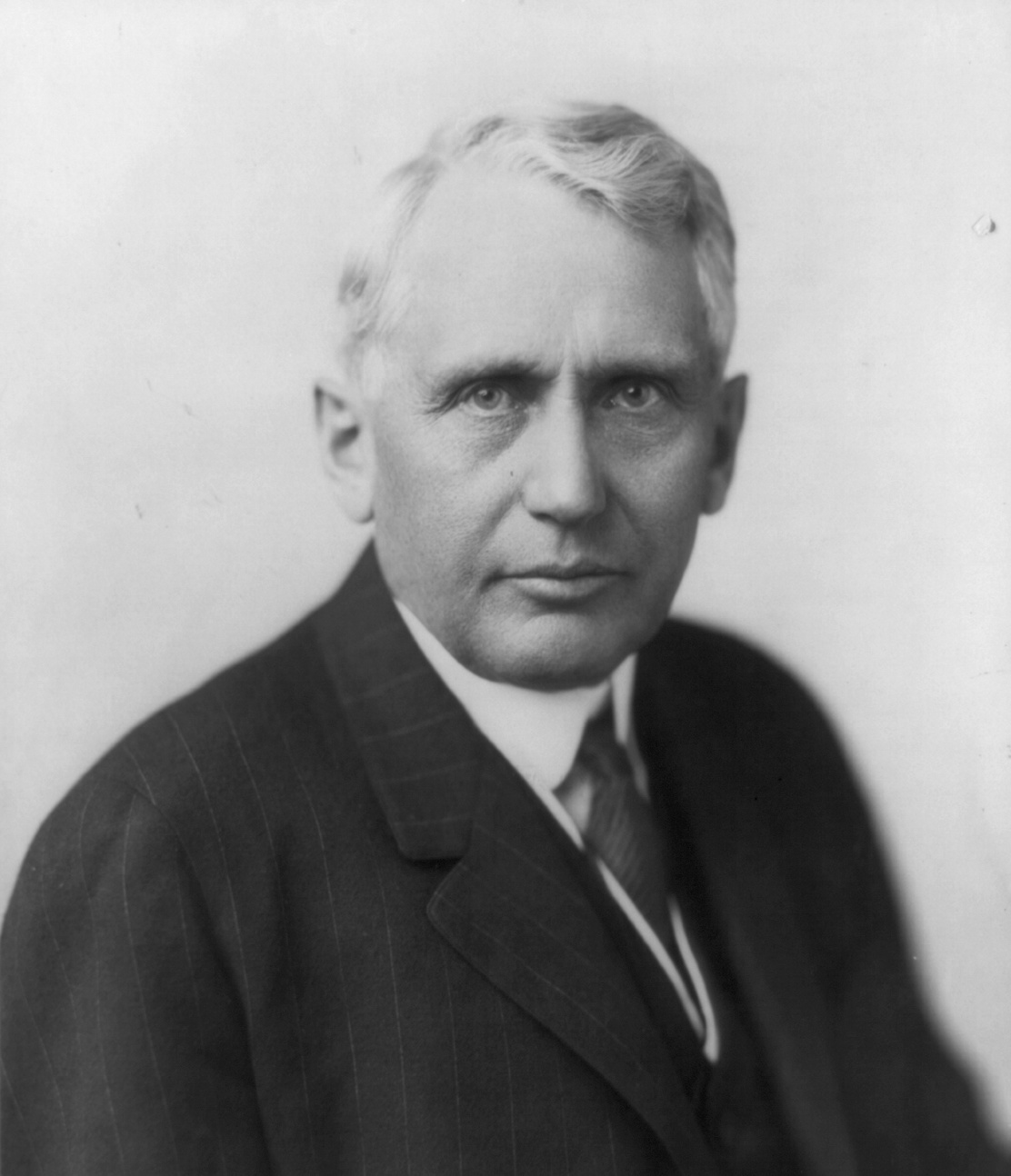

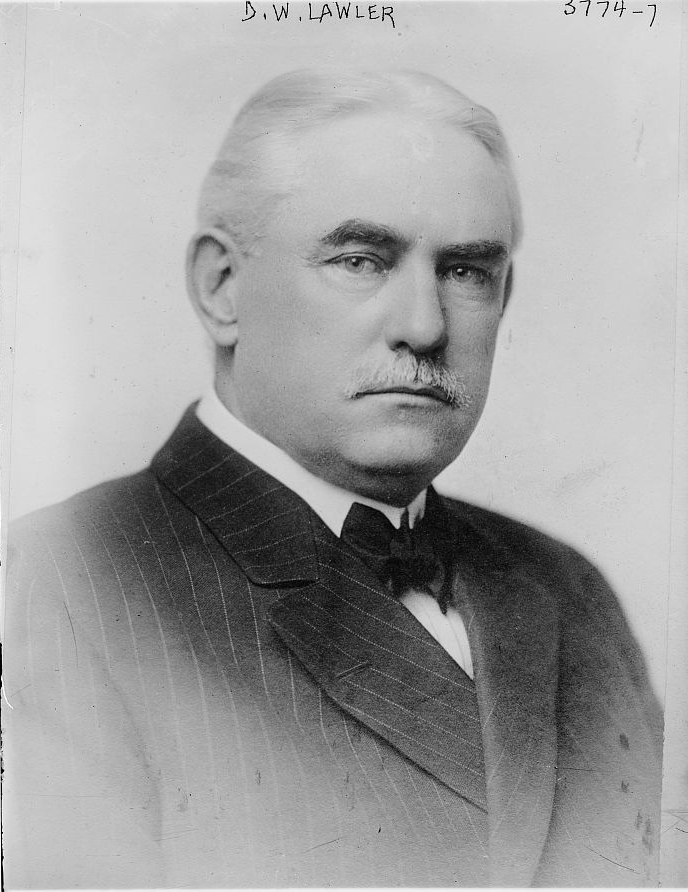

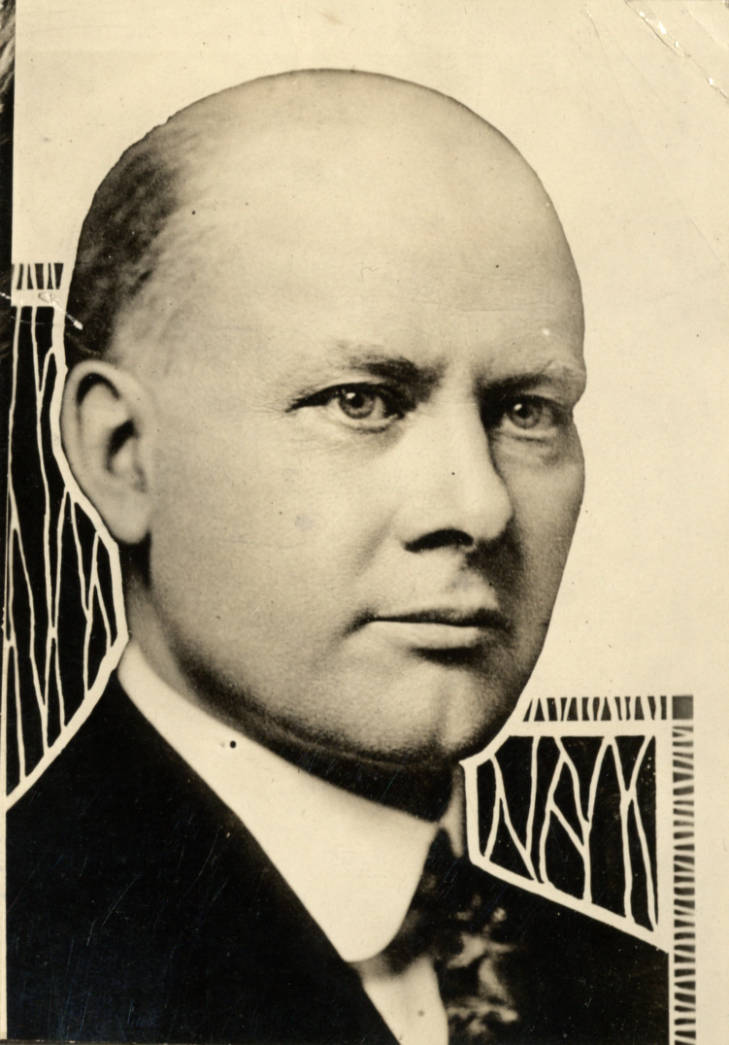
Nominee	Frank B. Kellogg	Daniel W. Lawler	Willis G. Calderwood
Party	Republican	Democratic	Prohibition
Popular vote	185,159	117,541	78,425
Percentage	48.58%	30.84%	20.58%
- County results Kellogg: 30–40% 40–50% 50–60% 60–70% Lawler: 40–50% 50–60%
U.S. senator before election
Moses E. Clapp
Republican
Elected U.S. Senator
Frank B. Kellogg
Republican

The 1916 United States Senate election in Minnesota took place on November 7, 1916. It was the first election for either class of U.S. senators held in Minnesota after the ratification of the Seventeenth Amendment to the United States Constitution, which established the popular election of United States senators. Incumbent Senator Moses E. Clapp was defeated in the Republican primary election by former American Bar Association president Frank B. Kellogg. Kellogg went on to defeat former St. Paul Mayor Daniel W. Lawler of the Minnesota Democratic Party, and Prohibition Party challenger Willis Greenleaf Calderwood, in the general election.

== Democratic primary ==
=== Candidates ===
==== Declared ====
- Alfred J. Davis, Minneapolis resident who worked in real estate, Democratic candidate in Wisconsin for the 3rd CD in 1896, Democratic nominee for Minnesota state House District 43 in 1912
- Daniel W. Lawler, Former U.S. Attorney (1886–1891), former Mayor of St. Paul (1908–1910), Democratic nominee for U.S. Senator in 1893 and 1912

=== Results ===
Democratic primary election results
Party	Candidate	Votes	%
Democratic	Daniel W. Lawler	26,789	67.86%
Democratic	Alfred J. Davis	12,685	32.14%
Total votes		39,474	100.00%

== Republican primary ==
=== Candidates ===
==== Declared ====
- Moses E. Clapp, Incumbent U.S. Senator since 1901
- Adolph O. Eberhart, 17th Governor of Minnesota (1909–1915), attorney and bank director in Mankato, former state Senator from the 11th District (1903–1907), former Lieutenant Governor (1907–1909)
- Frank B. Kellogg, Former Rochester city attorney (1878–1881), former Olmsted County Attorney (1882–1887), member of the Republican National Committee (1904–1912), former President of the American Bar Association (1912–1913)
- Charles A. Lindbergh, U.S. Representative from Minnesota's 6th congressional district since 1907, former prosecuting attorney of Morrison County (1891–1893)

=== Results ===
Republican primary election results
Party	Candidate	Votes	%
Republican	Frank B. Kellogg	73,818	40.46%
Republican	Adolph O. Eberhart	54,890	30.08%
Republican	Moses E. Clapp (Incumbent)	27,668	15.16%
Republican	Charles A. Lindbergh	26,094	14.30%
Total votes		182,470	100.00%

== General election ==
=== Results ===
General election results
Party	Candidate	Votes	%
Republican	Frank B. Kellogg	185,159	48.58%
Democratic	Daniel W. Lawler	117,541	30.84%
Prohibition	W. G. Calderwood	78,425	20.58%
Total votes		381,125	100.00%
Majority		67,618	17.74%
Republican hold			

== See also ==
- 1916 United States Senate elections
