= 1892 Minnesota gubernatorial election =

- November 8, 1892
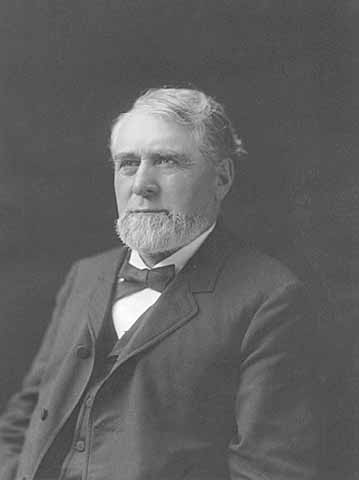

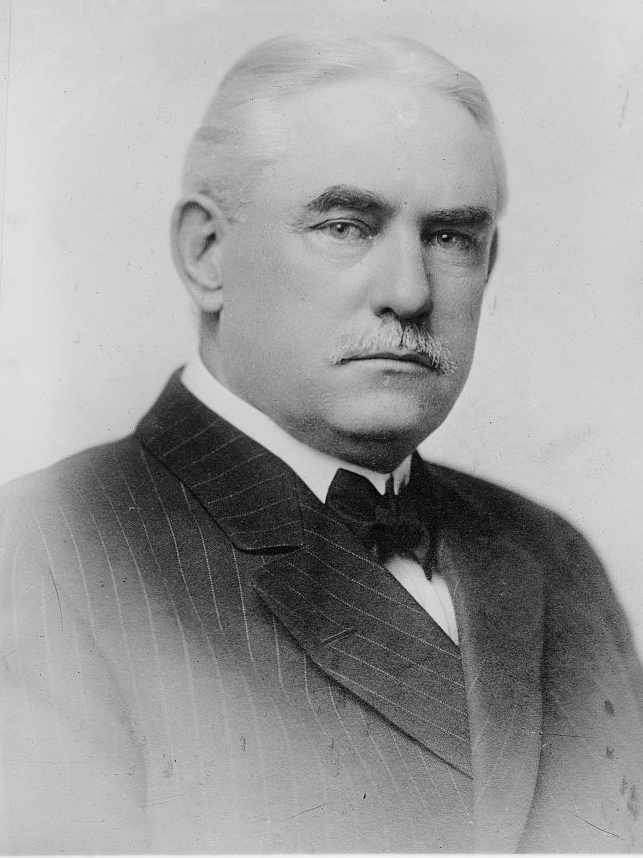

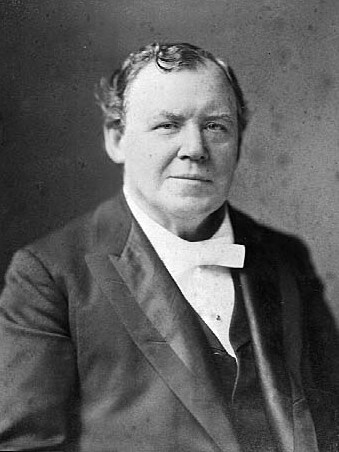
Nominee	Knute Nelson	Daniel W. Lawler	Ignatius L. Donnelly
Party	Republican	Democratic	Populist
Popular vote	109,220	94,600	39,862
Percentage	42.68%	36.96%	15.58%
- County results Nelson: 30–40% 40–50% 50–60% 60–70% 70–80% Becker: 30–40% 40–50% 50–60% 60–70% Donnelly: 30–40% 40–50% 50–60%
Governor before election
William Rush Merriam
Republican
Elected Governor
Knute Nelson
Republican

The 1892 Minnesota gubernatorial election took place on November 8, 1892. Republican Party of Minnesota candidate Knute Nelson defeated Democratic Party of Minnesota challenger Daniel W. Lawler and People's Party candidate Ignatius L. Donnelly.

== Candidates ==
- William J. Dean, Civil War veteran (Prohibition)
- Ignatius L. Donnelly, former lieutenant governor (Populist)
- Daniel W. Lawler, attorney (Democratic)
- Knute Nelson, representative from Minnesota's 5th congressional district (Republican)

== Campaigns ==
Prior to the beginning of the Republican State Convention, Nelson was already the expected winner. 77.2% of delegates (548 of the 709) were already pledged to vote for him before the convention began. There were also delegates pledged to Andrew Ryan McGill and Gideon S. Ives. When the Republican State Convention was held on July 9, 1892, Ives dropped out of the race, leading to a vote between Nelson and McGill. Nelson would be victorious (though the vote was closer than expected) and secure the nomination.

Daniel Lawler launched his campaign on July 29, 1892, and the Ramsey County Democratic delegates moved to make him the Democratic nominee at the State Convention. Lawler, in a move away from the Democrat's two previous conservative candidates, presented himself as a reformer. Lawler was unable to escape a reputation of being called 'Hill's Candidate', in reference to James J. Hill, the wealthy railway director. Hill campaigned for Lawler, especially among the historically Republican Irish-Americans, and the increasingly competitive Scandinavian-Americans.

This election would be the first that the Populists participated in. Longtime progressive Ignatius Donnelly was their first nominee. In the previous election, Farmer's Alliance candidate Sidney M. Owen succeeded in coming in a strong third place, getting 24% of the vote, which was the highest percentage received by a third party in a Minnesota gubernatorial election up to that point. Donnelly's strategy was to build off of that voter base. Donnelly proved to be somewhat overconfident, making fun of Nelson's prediction that Donnelly would get 35,000 votes, with Donnelly making his own prediction that he would get 100,000 votes. Nelson's prediction, though intended as an insult, would be very close to the actual results.

== Results ==
1892 gubernatorial election, Minnesota
Party	Candidate	Votes	%	±%
Republican	Knute Nelson	109,220	42.68%	+6.10%
Democratic	Daniel W. Lawler	94,600	36.96%	+1.33%
Populist	Ignatius L. Donnelly	39,862	15.58%	n/a
Prohibition	William J. Dean	12,239	4.78%	+1.28%
Majority		14,620	5.72%	
Turnout		255,921		
Republican hold		Swing		

== See also ==
- List of Minnesota gubernatorial elections
