= James Castle (politician) =

American politician (1836–1903)

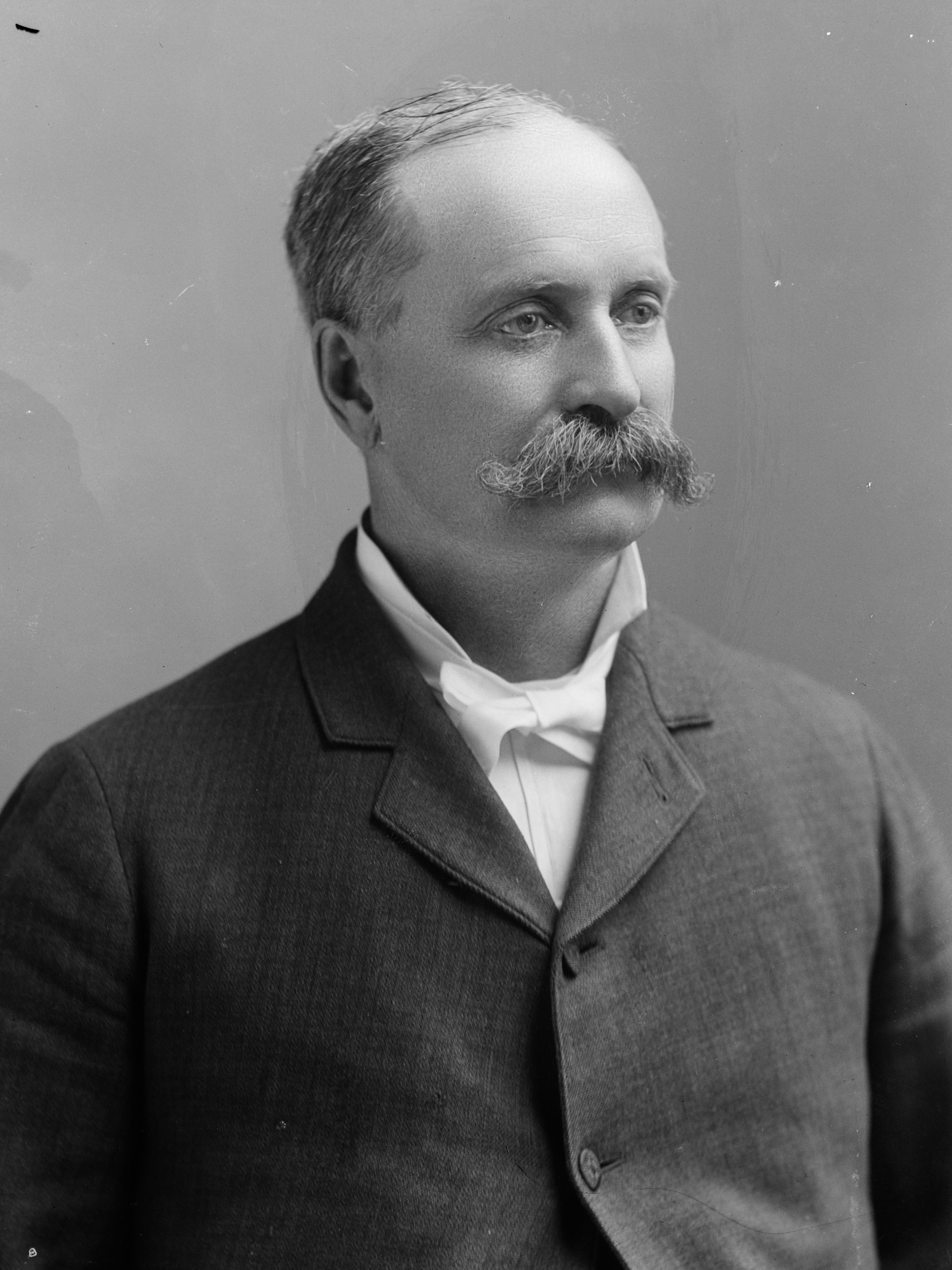
- Castle c. 1891 – c. 1894

Member of the U.S. House of Representatives from Minnesota's 4th district
- In office March 4, 1891 – March 3, 1893
- Preceded by: Samuel Snider
- Succeeded by: Andrew Kiefer

Member of the Minnesota Senate from the 2nd district
- In office 1869-1871
- Preceded by: William H.C. Folsom
- Succeeded by: Dwight M. Sabin

Member of the Minnesota Senate from the 24th district
- In office 1883-1886
- Preceded by: Charles Duncan Gilfillan
- Succeeded by: Edward White Durant

Personal details
- Born: May 23, 1836 Shefford, Lower Canada
- Died: January 2, 1903 (aged 66) Stillwater, Minnesota
- Party: Democratic
- Occupation: Lawyer

James Nathan Castle (May 23, 1836 – January 2, 1903) was a U.S. representative from Minnesota.

Castle was born in Shefford in Lower Canada where he attended the public schools, and then studied law. He moved to Afton, Minnesota, in 1862 and taught school. He completed his law studies and was admitted to the bar. He began practicing in Stillwater starting in 1865.

Castle was elected county attorney in 1866 to fill the unexpired term of his deceased brother. He was then elected Washington County Attorney in 1868, to the Minnesota Senate in 1868, 1878, and 1882, elected as a Democrat to the 52nd United States Congress (March 4, 1891 – March 3, 1893). While in congress, he was the chairman of the United States House Committee on Mileage (52nd Congress). He ran unsuccessfully for reelection in 1892.

He returned to the practice of law until his death in Stillwater in 1903. He is buried in Fairview Cemetery.

U.S. House of Representatives
Preceded by Samuel Snider	U.S. Representative from Minnesota's 4th congressional district 1891 – 1893	Succeeded by Andrew Kiefer
