= Robert A. Smith (mayor) =

American politician (1827–1913)

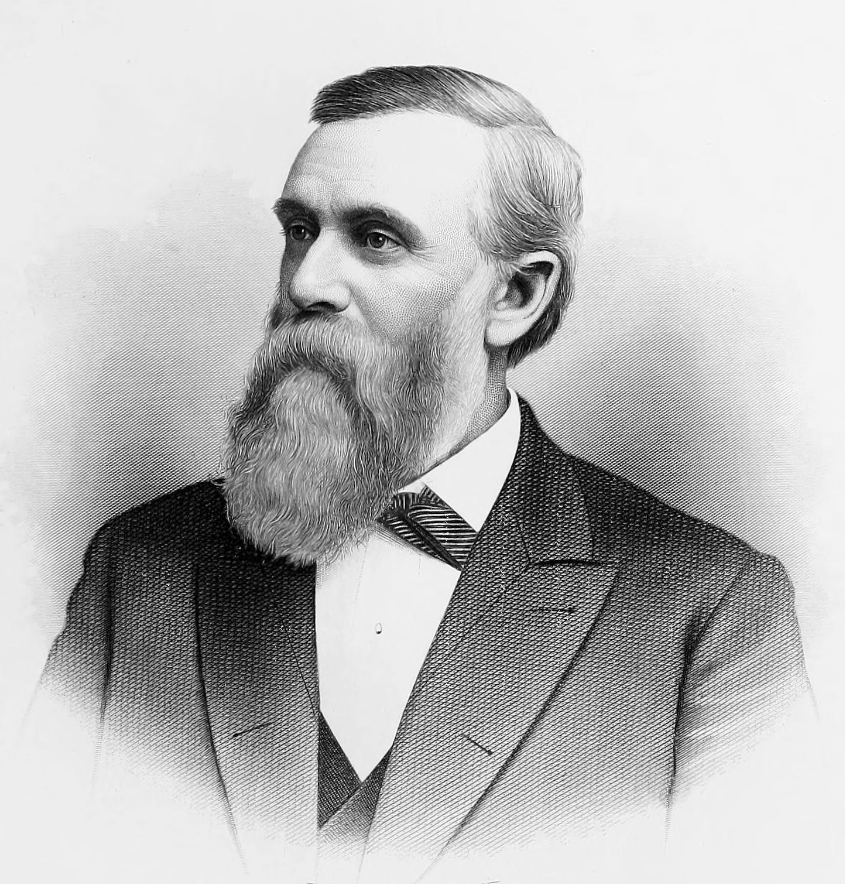
- Smith in 1892

22nd, 24th, & 29th Mayor of St. Paul
- In office 1887–1892
- Preceded by: Edmund Rice
- Succeeded by: Frederick P. Wright
- In office 1894–1896
- Preceded by: Frederick P. Wright
- Succeeded by: Frank Doran
- In office 1900–1908
- Preceded by: Andrew Kiefer
- Succeeded by: Daniel W. Lawler

Member of the Minnesota State Senate for District 27
- In office January 3, 1887 – January 4, 1891
- Preceded by: Chauncey Wright Griggs
- Succeeded by: William Blake Dean

Member of the Minnesota House of Representatives for District 27
- In office January 6, 1885 – January 3, 1887
- Preceded by: William Dalton Cornish
- Succeeded by: O. O. Cullen

Ramsey County Treasurer
- In office 1856–1868

Personal details
- Born: June 13, 1827 Boonville, Indiana
- Died: February 12, 1913 (aged 85) St. Paul, Minnesota
- Party: Democratic Party of Minnesota

Robert Armstrong Smith (June 13, 1827 – February 12, 1913) was a politician from the state of Minnesota. He thrice served as mayor of St. Paul, Minnesota and in both the State House and State Senate.

Smith began his political career in his home area of Warrick County, Indiana where he served as County Auditor from 1849 until May 1853, when he moved to Minnesota Territory. While County Auditor, he earned his Law Degree from Indiana University in 1850.

Smith's first activity in Minnesota was as the Territorial Librarian, a job he held from 1853 until statehood in 1858. He was appointed to the position by his brother-in-law, governor Willis A. Gorman.

Smith began his political career in Minnesota as Ramsey County Treasurer, serving in that role from 1856 to 1868. He then served in the legislature for three terms, first in the House and then in the Senate, before serving as mayor of St. Paul three nonconsecutive times, with a total of five terms. While mayor, in 1890, he would unsuccessfully run for the Democratic nomination for Governor. In 1902 he unsuccessfully ran for Lieutenant Governor of Minnesota. His final political office would be a single term as Ramsey County Commissioner from 1911 to 1913, dying in office.

Smith Avenue in St. Paul was named after him in 1887, as he was the State Senator who authored a bill for the state to fund the High Bridge. Smith Avenue is the name of the street that runs across the bridge.
