= George Loomis Becker =

American politician from Minnesota (1829–1904)

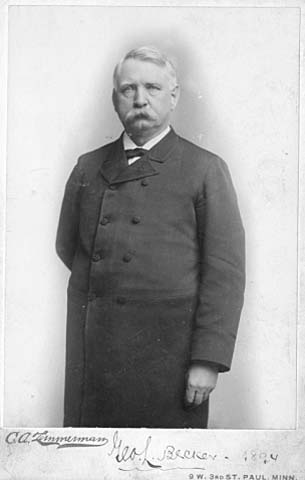
- Becker in ~1894

Member of the Minnesota Senate from the 1st district
- In office 1868–1872

6th Mayor of Saint Paul, Minnesota
- In office 1856–1857
- Preceded by: Alexander Ramsey
- Succeeded by: John B. Brisbin

Personal details
- Born: February 4, 1829 Locke, New York, U.S.
- Died: January 6, 1904 (aged 74) St. Paul, Minnesota, U.S.
- Party: Democratic
- Education: Case Western Reserve University; University of Michigan

George Loomis Becker (February 4, 1829 – January 6, 1904) was an American lawyer and Democratic politician who served as the sixth mayor of Saint Paul, Minnesota, from 1856 to 1857.

== Early life and education ==
Becker was born in Locke, New York, in 1829. He attended Case Western Reserve University and the University of Michigan Law School before relocating to St. Paul, Minnesota, in 1849 to practice law.

== Career ==
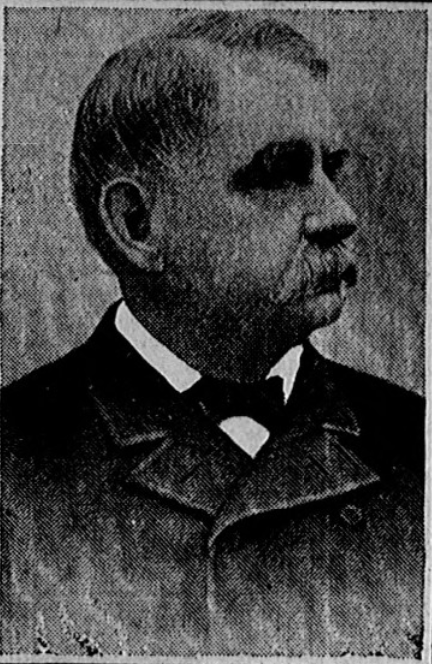
George Loomis Becker later in life

Becker formed a legal partnership with Edmund Rice and Ellis Whitall which lasted until 1856.

He first entered politics in 1854 when he was elected as a city council member for St. Paul. In 1856 he was elected mayor of St. Paul and served for a single, one-year term. He participated in the Democratic Minnesota Constitutional Convention in 1857 and was elected as one of three people to serve in the United States House of Representatives for the newly organized state. When it was revealed that the state would only receive two seats, Becker was the one left out. By some accounts he withdrew from consideration while others suggest the three candidates drew straws and Becker was the one who lost.

Becker went on to serve in the administration of Governor Henry Hastings Sibley and represented the first district of the Minnesota Senate from 1868 to 1872. He unsuccessfully ran for governor of Minnesota twice (in 1859 and 1894) and for a seat in the United States House of Representatives (in 1872). Outside of politics he spent much of his later life working in the railroad industry including positions with the Saint Paul and Pacific Railroad and the Western Railroad of Minnesota. He also served on the state's Railroad and Warehouse Commission from 1885 to 1901.

== Personal life ==
Loomis died in St. Paul on January 6, 1904. Becker County, Minnesota and Becker, Minnesota are named in his honor.

Party political offices
Preceded by Henry Hastings Sibley	Democratic nominee for Governor of Minnesota; 1859	Succeeded by Edward O. Hamlin
Preceded by Daniel W. Lawler	Democratic nominee for Governor of Minnesota; 1894	Succeeded by John Lind
