= Frank Doran (American politician) =

American politician (1839–1914)

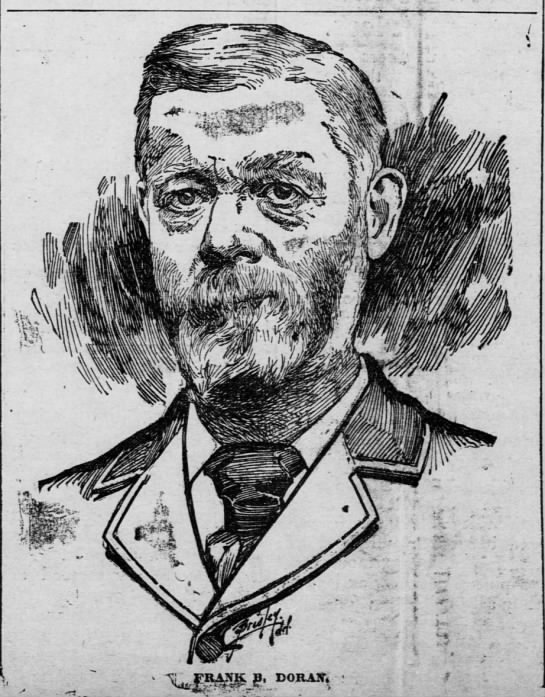
- Sketch of Doran in an 1896 publication of the St. Paul Globe
- Born: Frank Beecher Doran; May 1, 1839; Batavia, Illinois, U.S.
- Died: February 1, 1914 (aged 74); Saint Paul, Minnesota, U.S.
- Occupations: Politician, businessman
- Years active: 1892—1911
- Political party: Republican Party (c. 1894—1914); Republican Citizens' Party (?—1894)
- Spouse: Electa M. Gilbert
- Children: 4

Mayor of Saint Paul, Minnesota
- In office 1894–1896
- Preceded by: Robert A. Smith
- Succeeded by: Andrew Kiefer

Frank Beecher Doran (May 1, 1839 — February 1, 1914) was a Republican politician and the 24th mayor of Saint Paul, Minnesota, holding office between 1896 and 1898.

== Early life ==
Doran was born in Batavia, Illinois on May 1, 1839, to Solomon B. and Mercy (née Wilson) Doran. He had a younger brother, John. When he was 7, his family moved to McHenry County, Illinois, where he lived for the majority of his life, the only exception being his enlistment in the military. In August 1861, not long after graduating from Clark Seminary in Aurora, Illinois and taking a job at the railroad offices, he joined the 52nd Illinois Infantry Regiment to fight in the American Civil War. He only served a year before being honorably discharged due to injuries. While traveling to aid his injured brother just a few months later, however, he was captured by Confederate soldiers and imprisoned. He was initially held at a military prison in Mobile, Alabama but he was moved to Castle Thunder in Richmond, Virginia when it was discovered he was a civilian and no longer a soldier. He was in Castle Thunder for 4 months and while there found out they were holding him on suspicion of being a spy; he was then transferred to the nearby Libby Prison for 3.5 months. He subsequently spent a year at Salisbury Prison in Salisbury, North Carolina. By 1864, Doran was at the prison near Fort Fisher in Wilmington, North Carolina, where he could hear the First Battle of Fort Fisher despite being nearly 20 miles from the fort itself. He was only in Wilmington for a month before being moved to Florence Stockade in South Carolina, where he was finally paroled after a final month of imprisonment, before being sent back to the Union. At the time, newspapers claimed he was the longest imprisoned American in the United States, having been in Confederate possession from December 26, 1862, until March 4, 1865; 26 months total.

Following the war, Doran returned to farming in Illinois.

== Career ==
Doran moved to Saint Paul in 1881, where he ran a coal and wood distribution company with his brother John.

In 1892, Doran was elected Alderman and joined the Minnesota Legislature as a representative of the Republican Citizens' Party. In 1894, he left the Assembly and ran for mayor for the first time, also on the Republican Citizens' ticket, but lost to Robert A. Smith. In 1896, however, he won the mayoral election over O. O. Cullen, "who was regarded as the stronger candidate." By this point, he had left the Republican Citizen's Party for the Republican Party. In 1897, Doran ran for Governor of Minnesota but lost to David Marston Clough. Upon leaving office in 1898, Doran was accused, along with other members of the Republican Party, of trying to undermine the campaign of Andrew Kiefer, another Republican; at the same time, Doran was the "subject of slanderous lies, studied insults and base ingratitude" from his own party.

Despite this, the Republicans renominated Doran for mayor in 1902, though he again lost by about 1,800 votes to Smith, whose election marked the third time he had been elected mayor. The following year, he was appointed to the city's Charter Commission. Throughout his career, he had been President of the Chamber of Commerce several times, as well as President of the Minnesota Soldiers' Home Board of Trustees. Doran retired in February 1911.

== Personal life ==
Doran married McHenry County resident Electa M. Gilbert on September 28, 1865, and the couple had 4 children: Susie, George (c. 1868–1938), Charles, and Wilson James. Electa died in March 1909 in Saint Paul. Doran's brother John died in 1895 of "tuberculosis of the bone".

In 1905, Doran developed blood poisoning after ignoring a sore on his foot. On February 1, 1914, he died suddenly, perhaps from a seizure, stroke, or heart disease, in his Saint Paul home while reading a newspaper in front of the fire with his daughter.
