= 1904 Minnesota lieutenant gubernatorial election =

Minnesota lieutenant gubernatorial election, 1904
- November 8, 1904
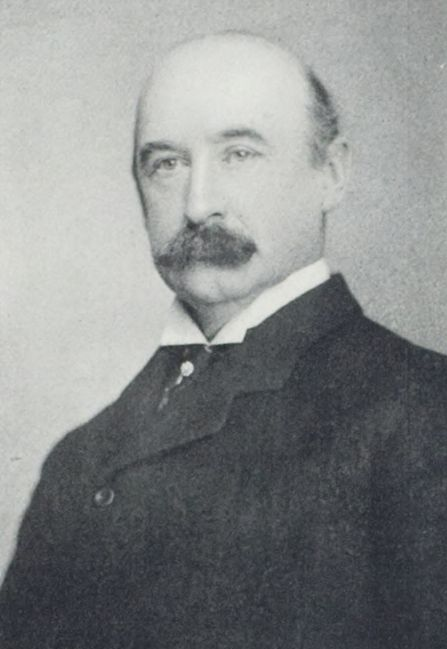

Nominee	Ray W. Jones	Fendall G. Winston
Party	Republican	Democratic
Popular vote	155,014	112,419
Percentage	54.13%	39.26%
Lieutenant Governor before election
Ray W. Jones
Republican
Elected Lieutenant Governor
Ray W. Jones
Republican

The 1904 Minnesota lieutenant gubernatorial election took place on November 8, 1904. Incumbent Lieutenant Governor Ray W. Jones of the Republican Party of Minnesota defeated Minnesota Democratic Party challenger Fendall G. Winston.

== Results ==
1904 lieutenant gubernatorial election, Minnesota
Party	Candidate	Votes	%	±%
Republican	Ray W. Jones (incumbent)	155,014	54.13%	−3.28%
Democratic	Fendall G. Winston	112,419	39.26%	+4.56%
Prohibition	Jergen F. Heiberg	10,283	3.59%	+0.57%
Public Ownership	O. E. Lofthus	8,657	3.02%	+1.07%
Majority		42,595	14.87%	
Turnout		286,373		
Republican hold		Swing		
