= Ray W. Jones =

American politician (1855–1919)

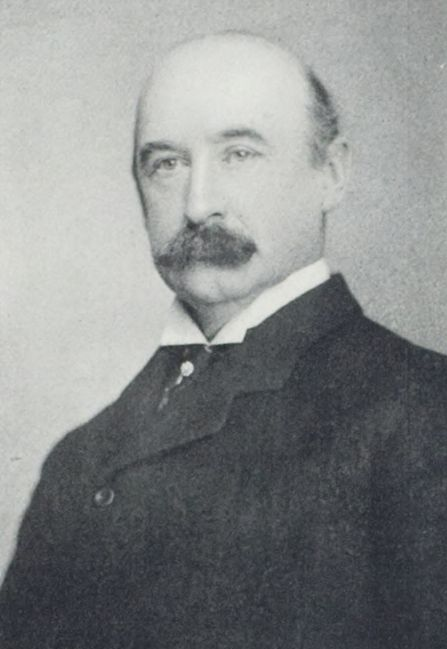

16th Lieutenant Governor of Minnesota
- In office January 5, 1903 – January 5, 1907
- Governor: Samuel Van Sant; John Albert Johnson
- Preceded by: Lyndon A. Smith
- Succeeded by: Adolph Olson Eberhart

Personal details
- Born: April 5, 1855 Remsen, New York, U.S.
- Died: August 1, 1919 (aged 64) Seattle, Washington, U.S.
- Party: Republican
- Spouse: Pauline B. Spitzley
- Profession: Banker, lumber executive, railroad executive

Ray Williams Jones (April 5, 1855 – August 1, 1919) was the 16th lieutenant governor of Minnesota. Born in Remsen, New York, moved to Minnesota, and became Lieutenant governor under Governors Samuel Van Sant and John Albert Johnson from January 5, 1903, to January 5, 1907. Married Pauline B. Spitzley. He died in 1919 in Seattle, Washington.

== Biography ==
Ray Williams Jones was born on 5 April 1855 in Remsen, Oneida County, New York, USA to John, R Jones (1822–1857), and Jennette Jones Jones (1823–1903). In 1879, he moved with his mother to Utica where he stayed until at least 1880, when he moved to Muskegon, Michigan, USA. During his time in Michigan, he worked as an accountant and later met his wife here.

Party political offices
Preceded by Lyndon A. Smith	Republican nominee for Lieutenant Governor of Minnesota; 1902, 1904	Succeeded by Adolph Olson Eberhart
Political offices
Preceded by Lyndon A. Smith	Lieutenant Governor of Minnesota; 1903–1907	Succeeded by Adolph Olson Eberhart
