= Sidney M. Owen =

Sidney Marcus Owen
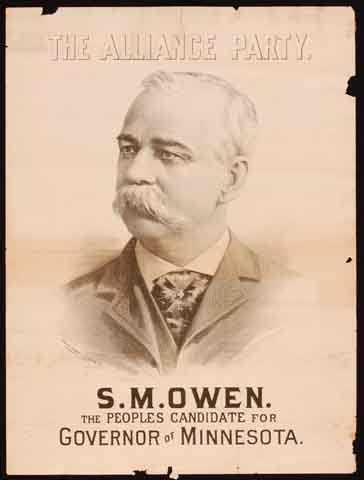
- A campaign poster featuring Owen, 1890
- Born: August 11, 1838; Norwich, Ohio
- Died: February 2, 1910 (aged 71); Minneapolis, Minnesota
- Burial place: Lakewood Cemetery
- Education: Oberlin College
- Political party: Populist Party
- Other political affiliations: Farmer's Alliance
- Spouse: Helen A. Feag (M. 1860)
- Children: Jessie, Harry
- Parents: Horatio Nelson Owen (father); Clarissa Owen (mother)

Sidney Marcus Owen (sometimes 'Marquis') (August 11, 1838 - February 2, 1910) was an American politician active in Minnesota in the 19th century.

== Biography ==
He was born in Norwich, Ohio. He attended Oberlin College. In 1864, during the American Civil War, he would join the 55th Ohio Infantry Regiment. He left the army with a rank of 1st Lieutenant.

Owen moved to Minneapolis, Minnesota, in 1885. He was editor of the agricultural journal Farm, Stock and Home. In 1890, the Farmer's Alliance, a powerful force in Minnesotan politics, voted to run their own candidates in the upcoming elections. After Knute Nelson showed no interest, Owen became the nominee. He placed third with 24.29% of the vote. In 1894 he would run again, for the Populist Party, coming in second place with 29.67% of the vote. In 1896, he narrowly lost the election for Minnesota's 5th district to Loren Fletcher, gaining 45.52% of the vote.

He would later be a member of the University of Minnesota board of regents, from 1893 to 1901 and was re-appointed by John Albert Johnson in 1905 for a term meant to last until 1913. He died on February 2, 1910, and was buried at Lakewood Cemetery.

== Legacy ==
He has been credited with the later success of progressive movements in Minnesota, such as the electoral victory of John Lind in 1898, and later the Farmer-Labor Party. Owen Hall in the University of Minnesota Crookston is named after him.

Party political offices
First	Farmer's Alliance nominee for Governor of Minnesota; 1890	
Preceded by Ignatius Donnelly	Populist Party nominee for Governor of Minnesota; 1894	Succeeded by John Lind
