= Frederick Stevens (American politician) =

American politician (1861–1923)

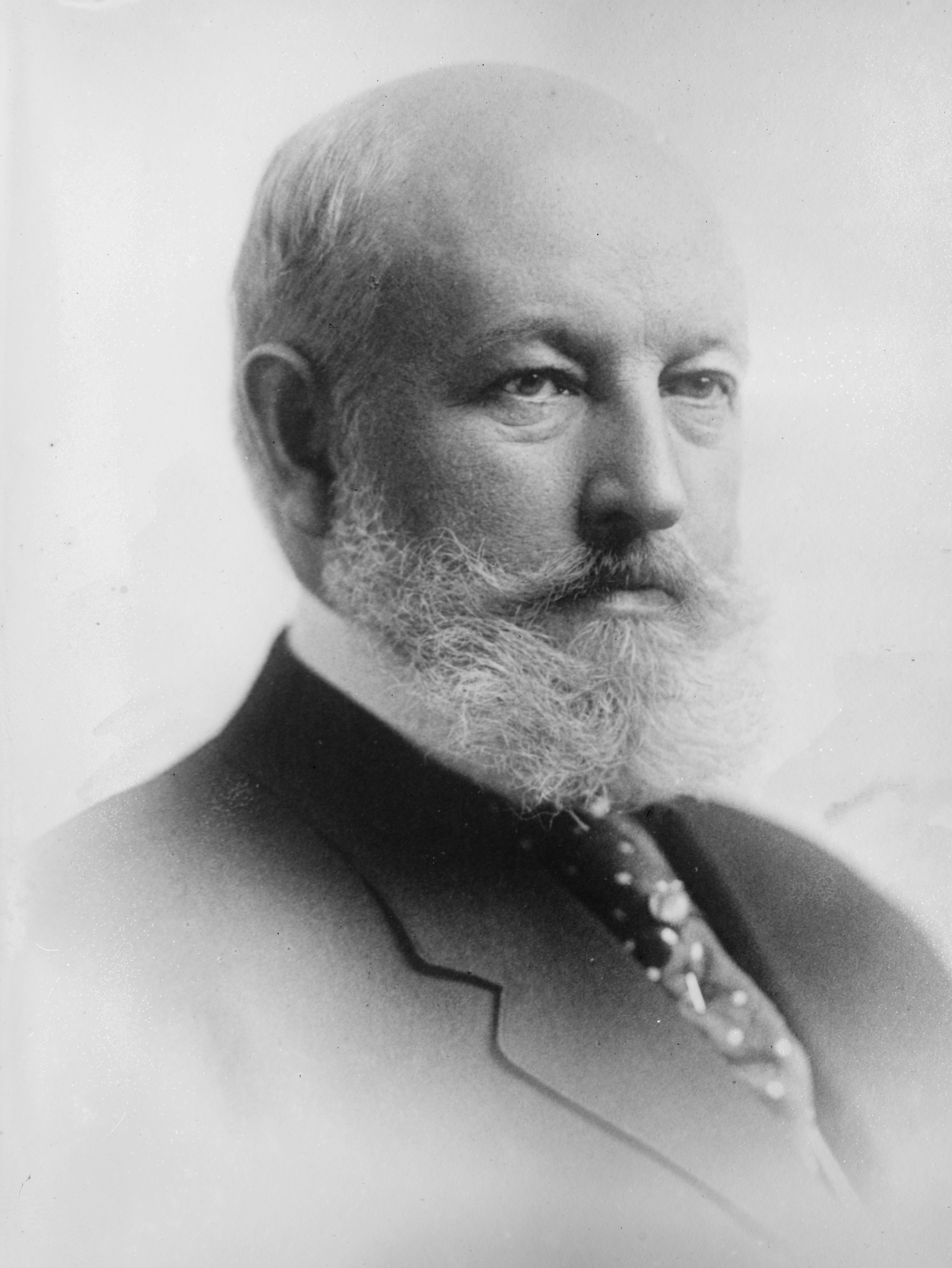
- Undated portrait of Stevens

Member of the U.S. House of Representatives from Minnesota's 4th district
- In office March 4, 1897 – March 3, 1915
- Preceded by: Andrew Kiefer
- Succeeded by: Carl Van Dyke

Personal details
- Born: January 1, 1861 Boston, Massachusetts, U.S.
- Died: July 1, 1923 (aged 62) Saint Paul, Minnesota, U.S.
- Resting place: Oakland Cemetery, Saint Paul, Minnesota
- Party: Republican
- Profession: Politician

Frederick Clement Stevens (January 1, 1861 – July 1, 1923) was an American politician who served as a U.S. representative from Minnesota from 1897 to 1915.

== Early life ==
Stevens was born in Boston, Massachusetts. He moved with his parents to Searsport, Maine and attended the common schools of Rockland, Maine. He graduated from Bowdoin College in Brunswick, Maine in 1881, and read law in Bangor, Maine. Stevens graduated from the law department of the University of Iowa at Iowa City in 1884. He was admitted to the bar in 1884 and commenced practice in St. Paul, Minnesota.

== Career ==
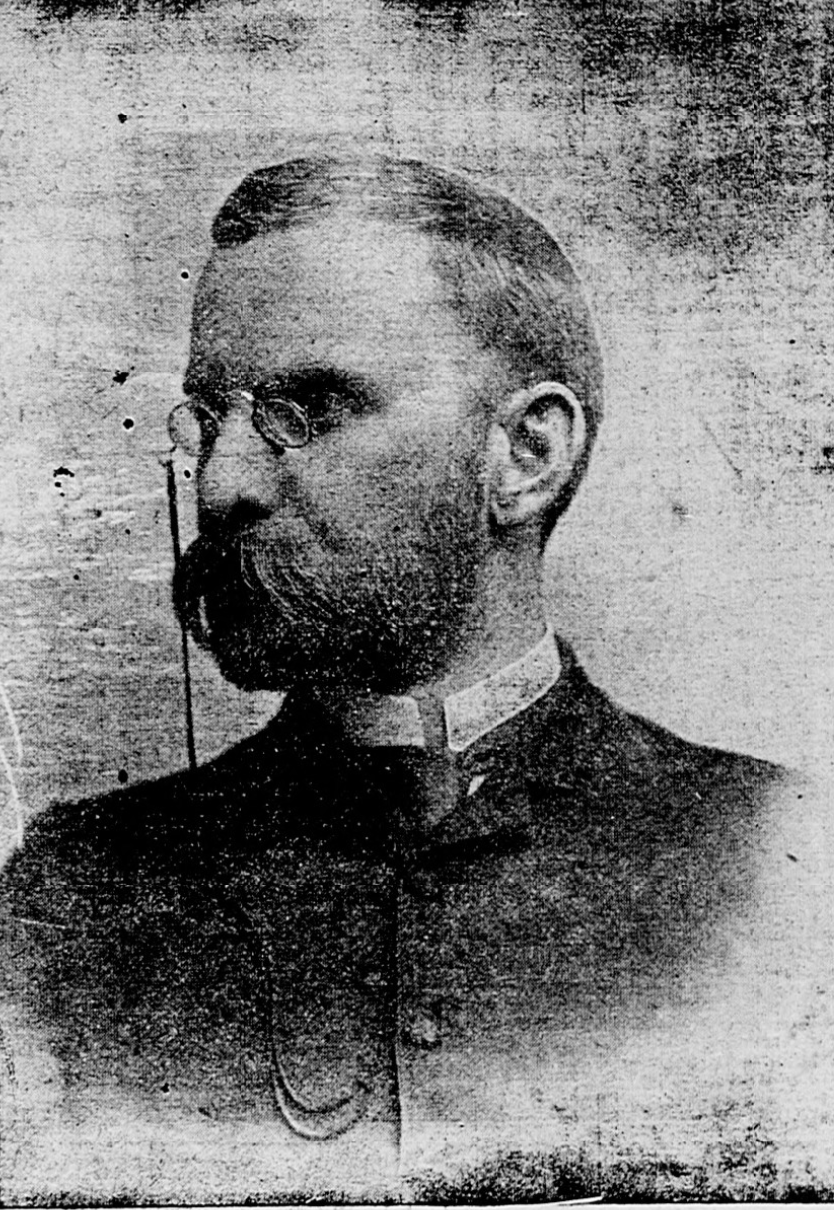
Stevens in 1902

Stevens was a member of the Minnesota House of Representatives 1888 – 1891; elected as a Republican to the 55th, 56th, 57th, 58th, 59th, 60th, 61st, 62nd, and 63rd congresses, (March 4, 1897 – March 3, 1915). In 1914, he was the principal Republican spokesman in the House of Representatives for the bill that ultimately was enacted as the Federal Trade Commission Act. He was an unsuccessful candidate for reelection in 1914 to the 64th congress.

== Death ==
Stevens engaged in the practice of law until his death in St. Paul, Minnesota.

U.S. House of Representatives
| Preceded by Andrew Kiefer | U.S. Representative from Minnesota's 4th congressional district 1897 – 1915 | Succeeded by Carl Van Dyke |
