= Andrew Kiefer =

American politician (1832–1904)

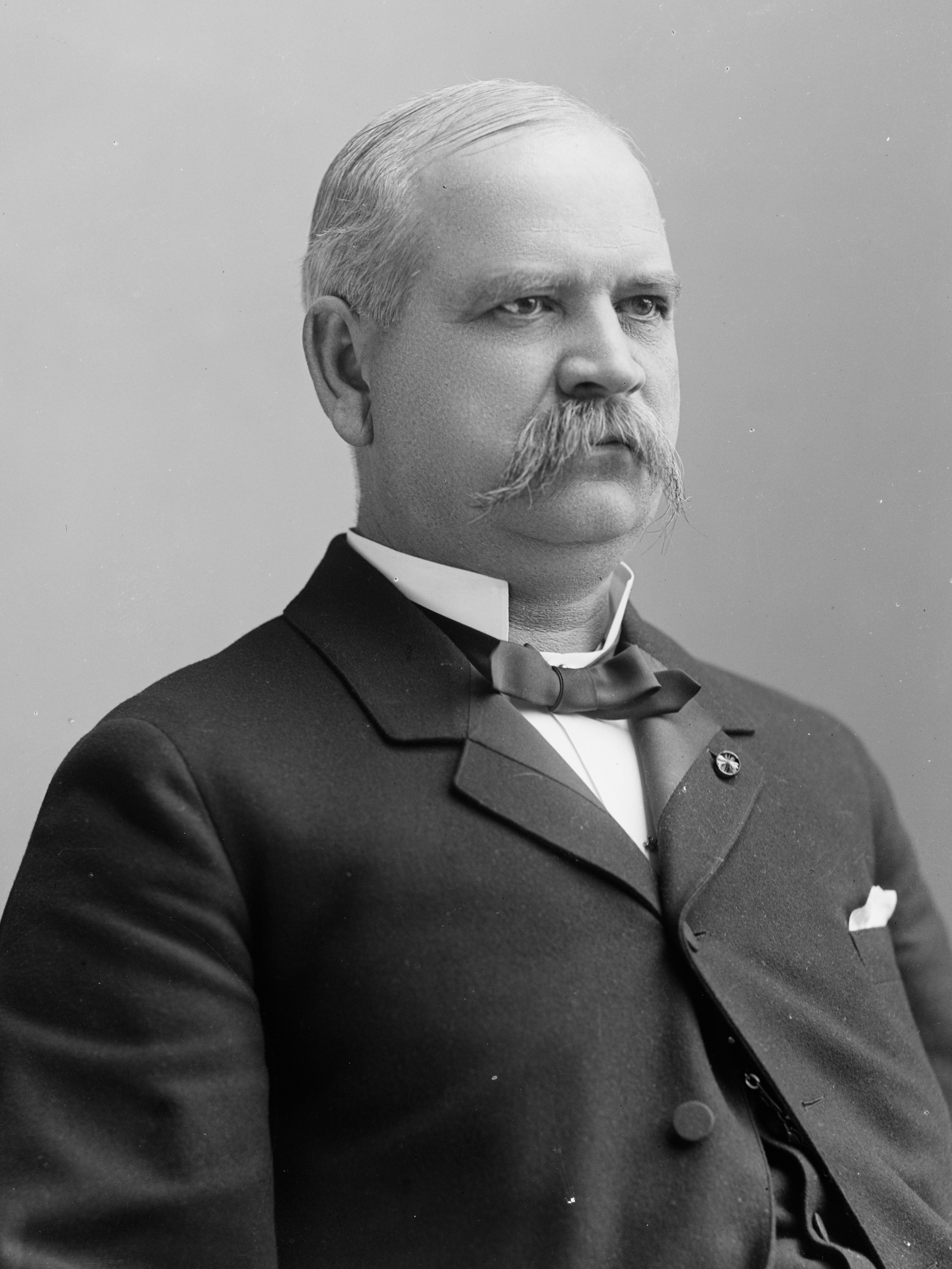
- Kiefer c. 1894–1901

28th Mayor of St. Paul
- In office 1898–1900
- Preceded by: Frank Doran
- Succeeded by: Robert A. Smith

Member of the U.S. House of Representatives from Minnesota's 4th district
- In office March 4, 1893 – March 3, 1897
- Preceded by: James Castle
- Succeeded by: Frederick Stevens

Personal details
- Born: May 25, 1832 Marienborn, Grand Duchy of Hesse (now Germany)
- Died: May 1, 1904 (aged 71) Saint Paul, Minnesota, U.S.
- Resting place: Oakland Cemetery, Saint Paul, Minnesota
- Party: Republican
- Profession: Merchant; politician

Military service
- Allegiance: United States of America
- Branch/service: Union Army
- Years of service: 1861-1863
- Rank: Captain
- Unit: 2nd Minnesota Infantry Regiment
- Commands: Company G, 2nd Minnesota Infantry Regiment
- Battles/wars: American Civil War

Andrew Robert Kiefer (May 25, 1832 – May 1, 1904) was a U.S. representative from Minnesota; born at Marienborn, Grand Duchy of Hesse; he attended school in Mainz; immigrated to the United States in 1849 and settled in St. Paul, Minnesota, in 1855; inspector and collector of the wharf in 1857; engaged in mercantile pursuits; enrolling clerk of the Minnesota House of Representatives in 1859 and 1860; entered the Union Army as the Captain of Company G, nicknamed the "German Union Guards" in the 2nd Minnesota Infantry Regiment, on July 8, 1861, and served until July 18, 1863, when he was compelled to resign on account of ill health; commissioned by Governor Swift colonel of the Thirty-first Regiment of State militia in 1863; member of the Minnesota House of Representatives in 1864; was engaged in the wholesale mercantile business 1865 – 1878 and in 1880 became interested in real estate; clerk of the district courts of Ramsey County 1878 – 1883; unsuccessful Republican candidate for mayor of St. Paul in 1890; elected as a Republican to the 53rd and 54th congresses, (March 4, 1893 – March 3, 1897); was not a candidate for reelection in 1896; mayor of St. Paul in 1898; at the time of his death was the Republican candidate for city controller; died in St. Paul, Ramsey County, Minnesota; interment in Oakland Cemetery.

U.S. House of Representatives
Preceded by James Castle	U.S. Representative from Minnesota's 4th congressional district 1893 – 1897	Succeeded by Frederick Stevens
