= Willis G. Calderwood =

American politician

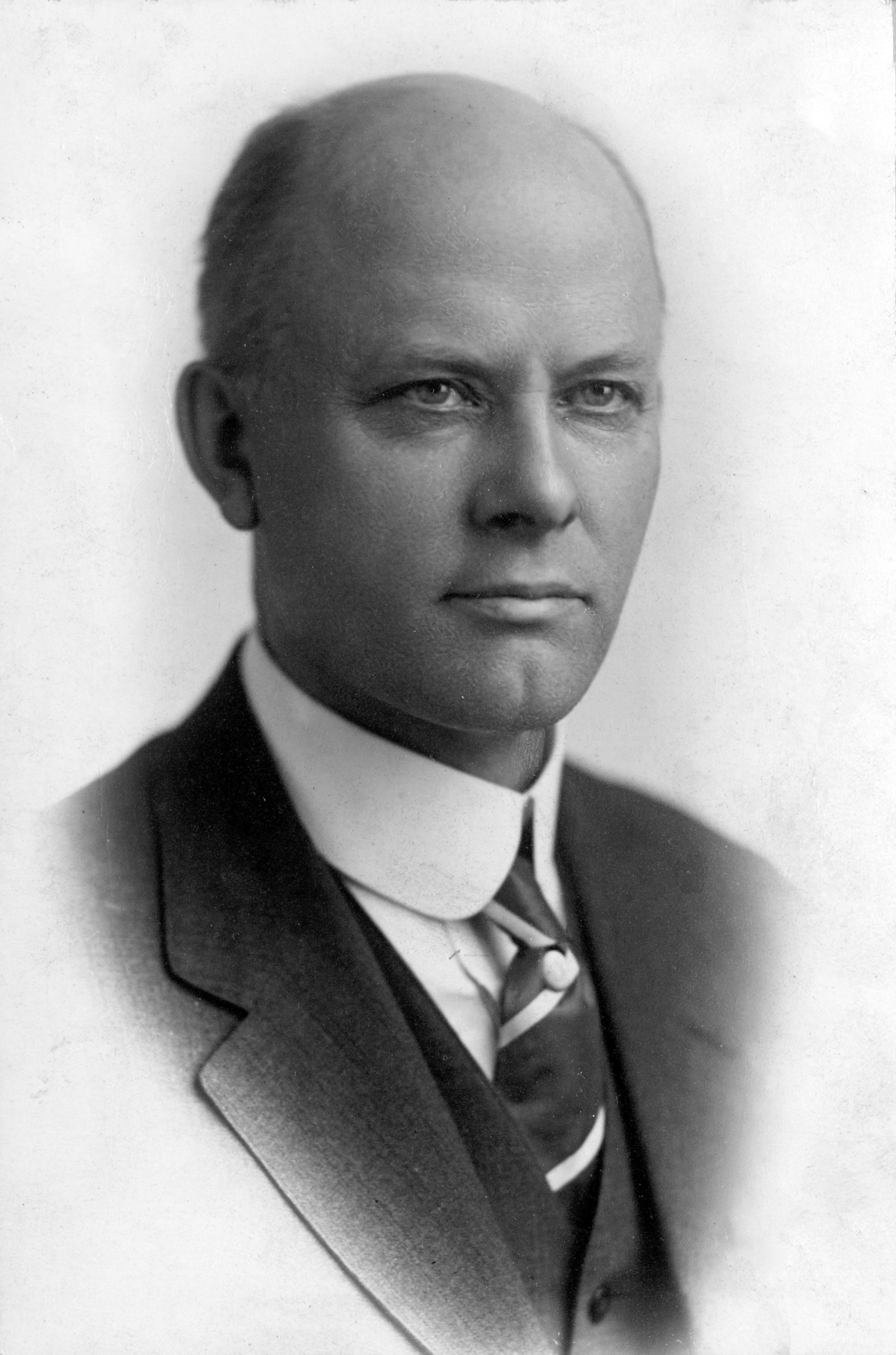
- Born: July 25, 1866; Fox Lake, Wisconsin
- Died: 1956 (aged 89–90)
- Occupation: Politician
- Known for: 1918 candidate for the Senate
- Political party: Prohibition, National (1918)
- Spouse: Alice M. Cox

Willis Greenleaf Calderwood (July 25, 1866 – 1956) was a Minnesota politician during the Progressive Era of American politics and was a candidate in multiple state elections in Minnesota.

== Biography ==
Calderwood was born on July 25, 1866, in Fox Lake, Wisconsin.

He ran in several statewide elections in Minnesota. In 1914, he ran for governor of Minnesota on the Prohibition ticket. He only received 18,582 votes, 5.41% of the total. Soon after this loss he challenged incumbent Republican senator Knute Nelson. Calderwood ran as a member of the National Party, which was a coalition of Progressives, Socialists, and Prohibitionists. In his 1918 senate run, he once again lost.

In 1940, Calderwood published the book Temperance Facts. It was a compiled book of information on prohibition, and argued that national prohibition was a successful policy, and it would be best if reestablished. He also published many other books on the issue of Prohibition.

He died in 1956 at the age of 89.
