= 1918 United States Senate election in Minnesota =

- November 5, 1918
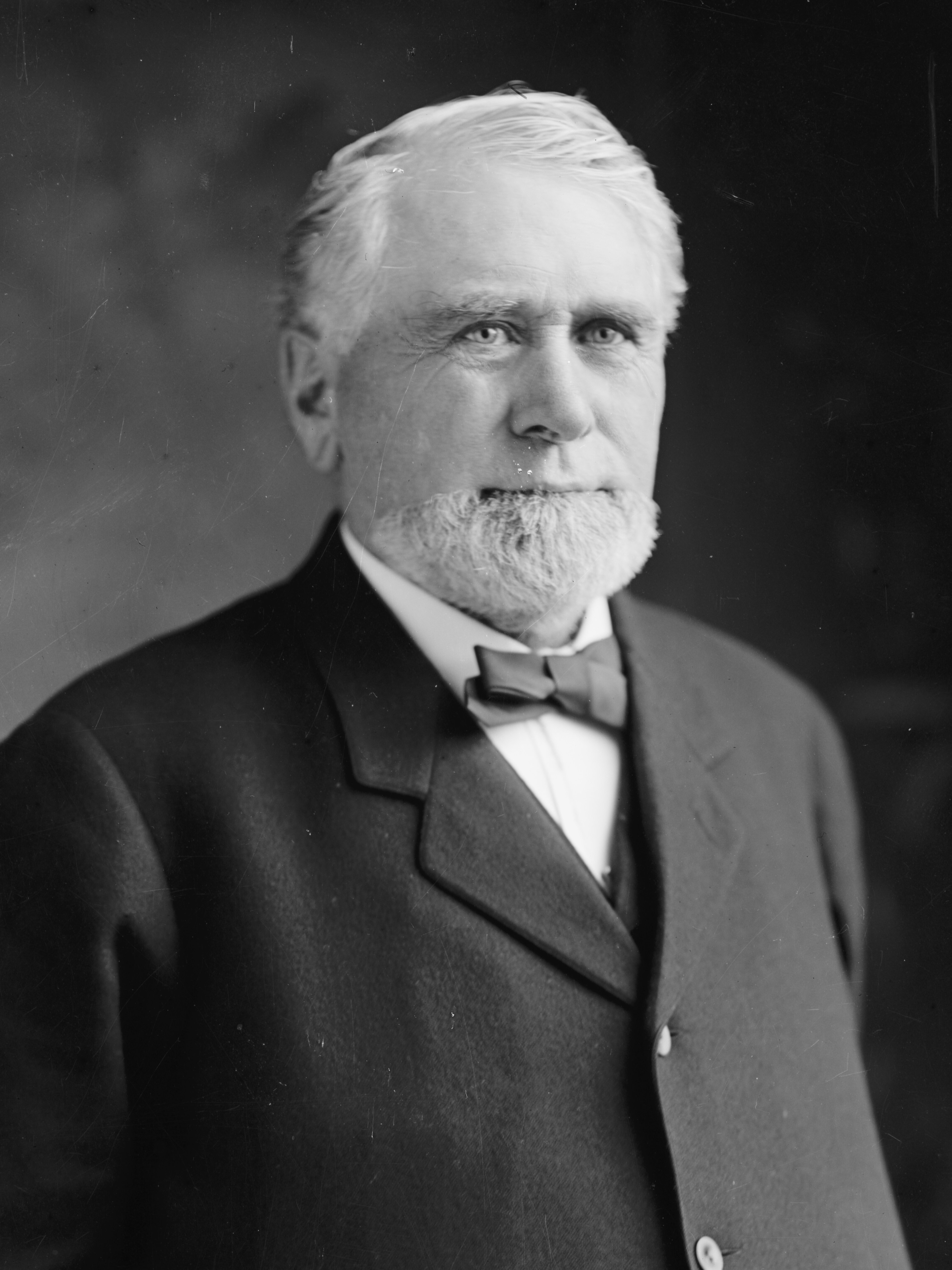

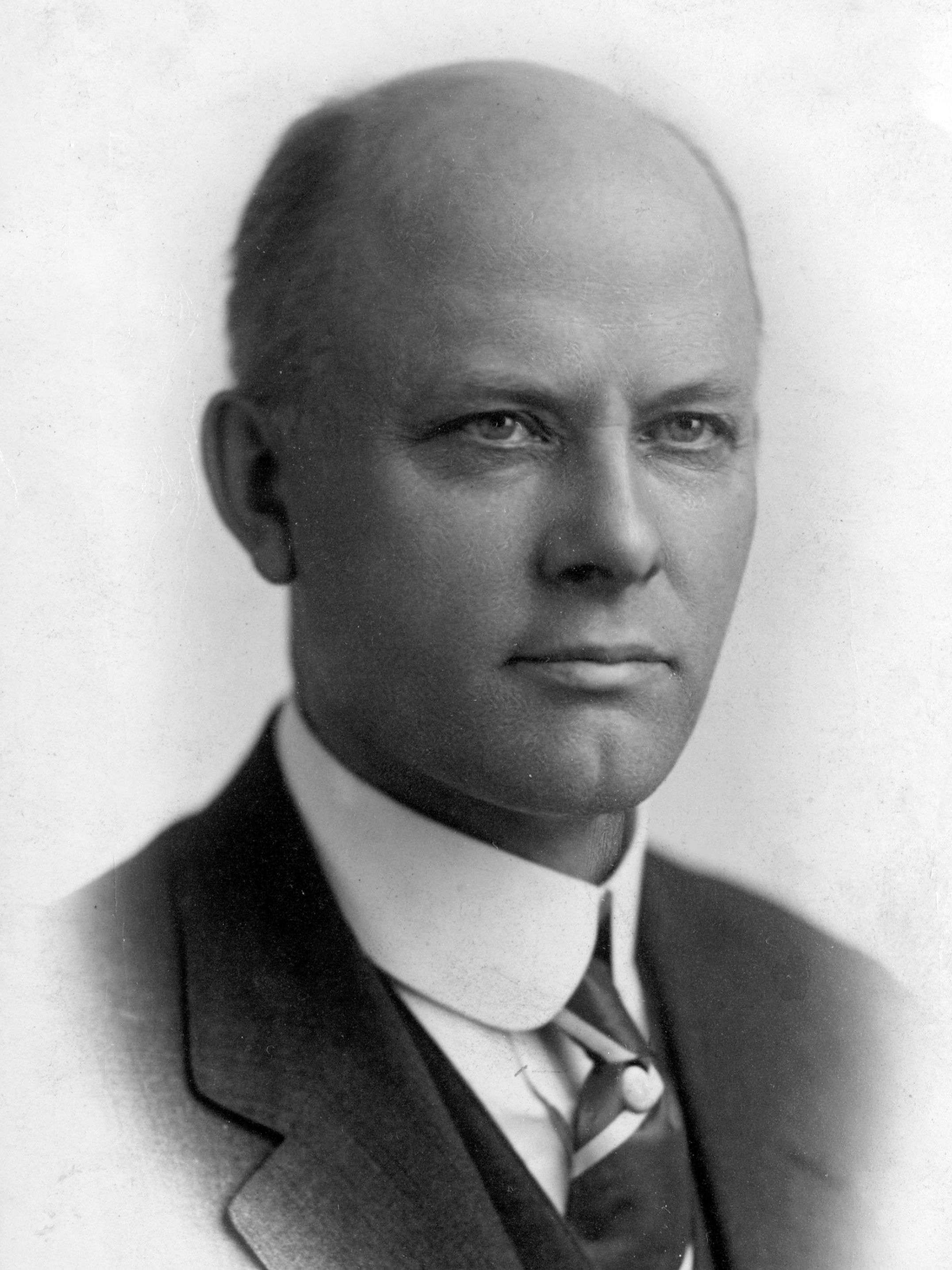
Nominee	Knute Nelson	Willis G. Calderwood
Party	Republican	National
Popular vote	206,428	137,334
Percentage	60.05%	39.95%
- County results Nelson: 50–60% 60–70% 70–80% Calderwood: 50–60% 60–70%
U.S. senator before election
Knute Nelson
Republican
Elected U.S. Senator
Knute Nelson
Republican

The 1918 United States Senate election in Minnesota took place on November 5, 1918. It was the first election for Minnesota's Class 2 seat in the United States Senate, and the second U.S. Senate election in Minnesota overall, held after the ratification of the Seventeenth Amendment to the United States Constitution, which established the popular election of United States senators. Incumbent U.S. Senator Knute Nelson of the Republican Party of Minnesota easily defeated his challenger in the general election, Willis Greenleaf Calderwood of the National Party, to win a fourth term in the Senate.

== Republican primary ==
=== Candidates ===
==== Declared ====
- Knute Nelson, Incumbent U.S. Senator since 1895
- James A. Peterson, Minneapolis attorney, former Hennepin County Attorney (1897–1899), former State Representative from the 42nd district (1901–1903), Republican candidate for U.S. Senate in 1912

=== Results ===
Republican primary election results
Party	Candidate	Votes	%
Republican	Knute Nelson (Incumbent)	229,923	71.99%
Republican	James A. Peterson	89,464	28.01%
Total votes		319,387	100.00%

== General election ==
=== Candidates ===
- Willis G. Calderwood, state chair of the Prohibition Party, Prohibition nominee for state House District 30 in 1894, for state House District 39 in 1904, 1906, 1908, and 1910, for the at-large U.S. House seat in 1912, for Governor in 1914, and for the U.S. Senate in 1916; Farmer-Labor candidate for Lieutenant Governor in 1924

=== Results ===
1918 Minnesota US Senate election results
Party	Candidate	Votes	%
Republican	Knute Nelson (Incumbent)	206,428	60.05%
National	Willis G. Calderwood	137,334	39.95%
Total votes		343,762	100.00%
Majority		69,094	20.10%
Republican hold			

== See also ==
- United States Senate elections, 1918
