= Carl Van Dyke =

American politician

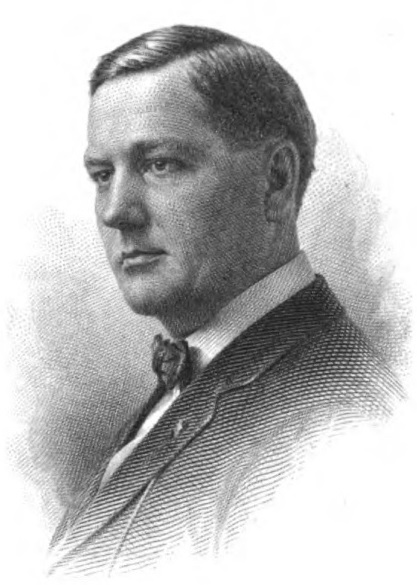
- Frontispiece of 1922's Carl C. Van Dyke, Late a Representative from Minnesota

Member of the U.S. House of Representatives from Minnesota's 4th district
- In office March 4, 1915 – May 20, 1919
- Preceded by: Frederick Stevens
- Succeeded by: Oscar Keller

Personal details
- Born: February 18, 1881 Alexandria, Minnesota, U.S.
- Died: May 20, 1919 (aged 38) Washington, D.C., U.S.
- Resting place: Forest Cemetery, Saint Paul, Minnesota
- Party: Democratic
- Spouse: Myrtle Belle Van Dyke (m. 1901-1919, his death)
- Relatives: Van Dyke family
- Education: St. Paul College of Law
- Profession: Attorney

Carl Chester Van Dyke (February 18, 1881 – May 20, 1919) was an American soldier, lawyer and politician from Minnesota.

== Early life and career ==
Van Dyke was born in Alexandria and attended the local public schools there. He taught primary school classes in surrounding Douglas County from 1899 to 1901. Later that year, he volunteered for the U.S. Army and served as a private in Company B, 15th Regiment, Minnesota Volunteer Infantry during the Spanish–American War. In 1916, he graduated from the St. Paul College of Law (later accredited as the William Mitchell College of Law) and was admitted to the bar at St. Paul. Van Dyke did not engage in extensive practice. He was elected Commander-in-Chief of the United Spanish War Veterans on September 6, 1918.

Van Dyke was elected as a Democrat to the Sixty-fourth, Sixty-fifth, and Sixty-sixth congresses and served from March 4, 1915, until his death in Washington, D.C., May 20, 1919. On April 6, 1917, he voted against declaring war on Germany. His interment was in a mausoleum in Forest Cemetery, St. Paul, Minnesota.

== See also ==
- List of members of the United States Congress who died in office (1900–1949)

U.S. House of Representatives
Preceded by Frederick Stevens	Member of the U.S. House of Representatives from Minnesota's 4th congressional district March 4, 1915 – May 20, 1919	Succeeded by Oscar Keller
