= Oscar Keller =

American politician (1878–1927)

Oscar Edward Keller
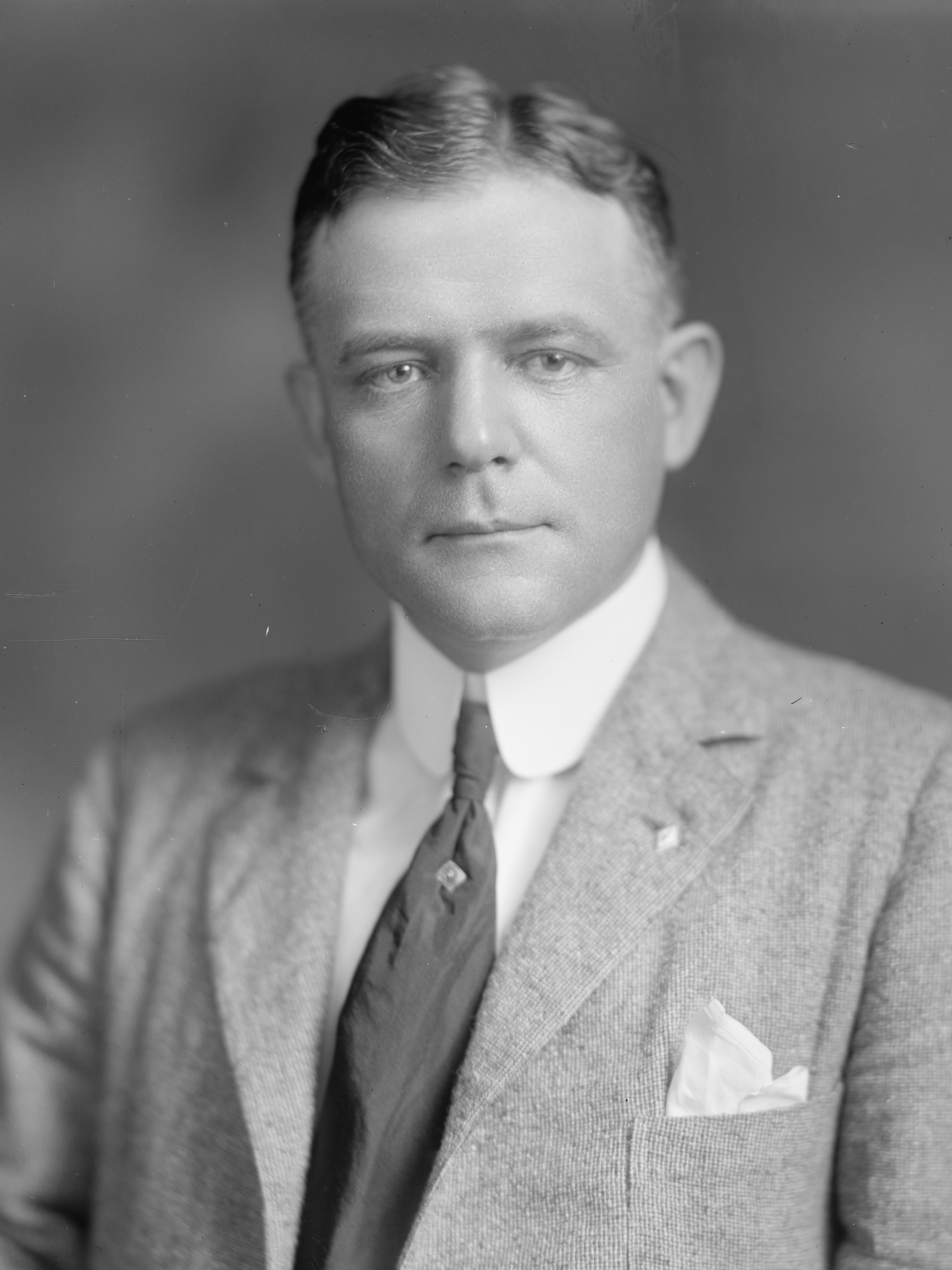
- Born: 30 July 1878; Helenville, Wisconsin
- Died: 21 November 1927 (aged 49)
- Occupation: Representative from Minnesota

Oscar Edward Keller (July 30, 1878 – November 21, 1927) was a representative from Minnesota.

He was born in Helenville, Wisconsin, and attended the public schools and the University of Wisconsin–Madison. He moved to Minnesota in 1901 and settled in St. Paul.

He was employed as a billing clerk and later engaged in mercantile pursuits. He was a member of the city council of St. Paul from 1910 to 1914, city commissioner from 1914 to 1919, and commissioner of public utilities from 1914 to 1919.

He was elected as an Independent Republican to the 66th congress to fill the vacancy caused by the death of Carl Van Dyke. He was reelected as a Republican to the 67th, 68th, and 69th congresses and served from July 1, 1919, to March 3, 1927. He was chairman of the Committee on Railways and Canals (68th and 69th Congresses). He was an unsuccessful candidate for renomination in 1926.

He was also engaged in the real estate business.

He died in St. Paul, Minnesota, and was interred in Elmhurst Cemetery.

U.S. House of Representatives
Preceded by Carl Van Dyke	U.S. Representative from Minnesota's 4th congressional district 1919 – 1927	Succeeded by Melvin Maas
