= Samuel Snider =

American politician

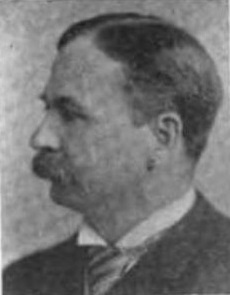
- From Volume V (1914) of Herringshaw's National Library of American Biography

Member of the U.S. House of Representatives from Minnesota's 4th district
- In office March 4, 1889 – March 3, 1891
- Preceded by: Edmund Rice
- Succeeded by: James Castle

Member of the Minnesota House of Representatives
- In office 1884-1888

Personal details
- Born: October 9, 1845 Mount Gilead, Ohio, U.S.
- Died: September 24, 1928 (aged 82) Minneapolis, Minnesota, U.S.
- Resting place: Lakewood Cemetery
- Party: Republican

Samuel Prather Snider (October 9, 1845 – September 24, 1928) was a representative from Minnesota. He was born in Mount Gilead, Morrow County, Ohio and attended the public schools, the local high school at Mount Gilead, Ohio, and Oberlin College, Ohio.

During the Civil War he enlisted as a private soldier in the Sixty-fifth Regiment, Ohio Volunteer Infantry. After the war he engaged in commercial pursuits in New York, moved to Minnesota in 1876 and settled in Minneapolis.

He organized and built the Midland Railway in southern Minnesota and engaged in agricultural pursuits and the mining of iron ore.

he was a member of the Minnesota House of Representatives 1884–1888; was elected as a Republican to the 51st United States Congress (March 4, 1889 – March 3, 1891). He was also unsuccessful for reelection in 1890 to the 52nd congress. He was a delegate to the Republican National Convention in 1892.

He retired and resided in Minneapolis until his death, interment was in Lakewood Cemetery.

U.S. House of Representatives
Preceded by Edmund Rice	U.S. Representative from Minnesota's 4th congressional district 1889–1891	Succeeded by James Castle
