= 1902 Minnesota lieutenant gubernatorial election =

Minnesota lieutenant gubernatorial election, 1902
- November 4, 1902
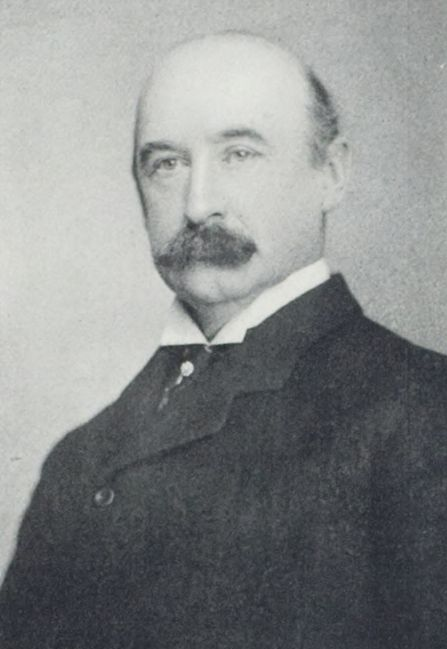

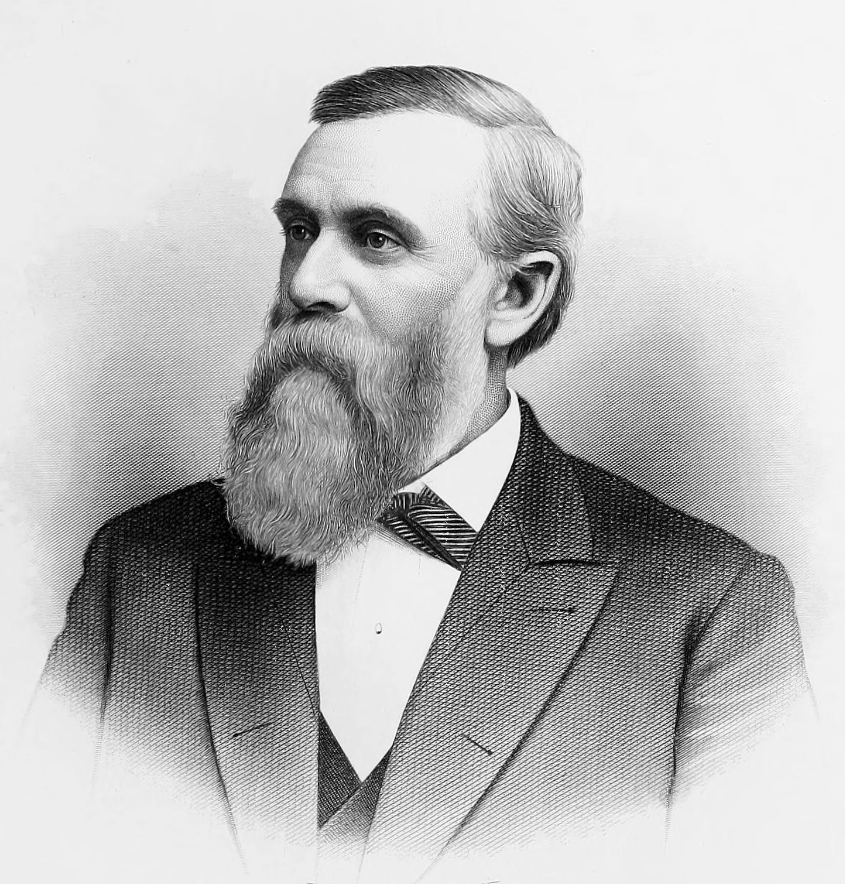
Nominee	Ray W. Jones	Robert A. Smith
Party	Republican	Democratic
Popular vote	151,660	91,655
Percentage	57.41%	34.70%
Lieutenant Governor before election
Lyndon A. Smith
Republican
Elected Lieutenant Governor
Ray W. Jones
Republican

The 1902 Minnesota lieutenant gubernatorial election took place on November 4, 1902. Republican Party of Minnesota candidate Ray W. Jones of the Republican Party of Minnesota defeated Minnesota Democratic Party challenger Robert A. Smith.

== Results ==
1902 lieutenant gubernatorial election, Minnesota
Party	Candidate	Votes	%	±%
Republican	Ray W. Jones	151,660	57.41%	+2.07%
Democratic	Robert A. Smith	91,655	34.70%	−6.57%
Prohibition	Hans H. Aaker	7,972	3.02%	+0.29%
Populist	John B. Hompe	7,736	2.93%	+2.27%
Socialist	Michael A. Brattland	5,143	1.95%	+1.95%
Majority		60,005	22.71%	
Turnout		264,166		
Republican hold		Swing		
