= Daniel W. Lawler =

American lawyer (1859–1926)

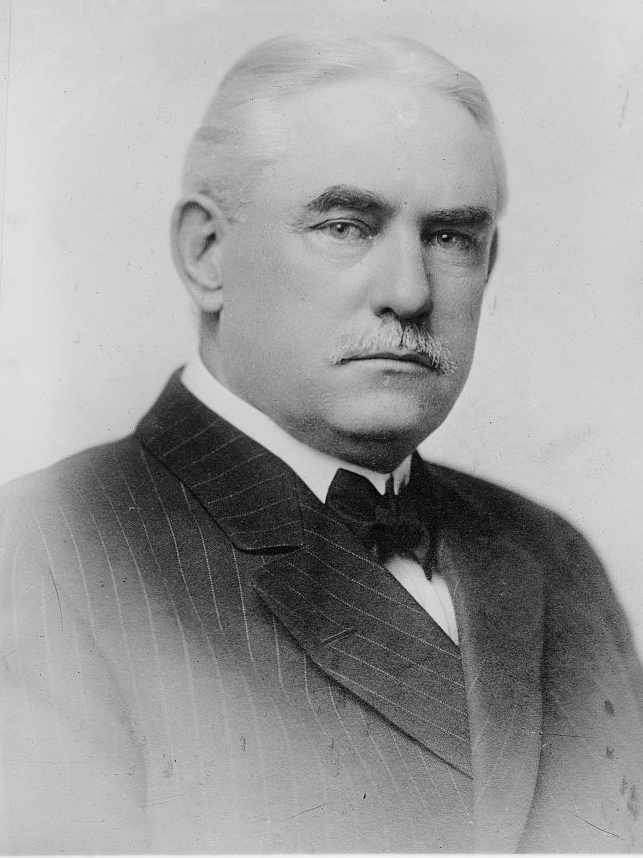

30th Mayor of Saint Paul
- In office 1908–1910
- Preceded by: Robert A. Smith
- Succeeded by: Herbert P. Keller

Personal details
- Born: Daniel William Lawler; March 28, 1859 Prairie du Chien, Wisconsin, U.S.
- Died: September 15, 1926 (aged 67) Saint Paul, Minnesota, U.S.
- Party: Democratic

Daniel William Lawler (March 28, 1859 – September 15, 1926) was an American politician who served as the 30th mayor of Saint Paul, Minnesota, from 1908 to 1910 as a member of the Democratic Party.

Lawler was born in Prairie du Chien, Wisconsin and moved to Minnesota in the 1880s. He became a lawyer. He was a Roman Catholic. Lawler was an unsuccessful candidate for Governor of Minnesota 1892, losing to Knute Nelson. As a conservative, he fell out of favor with the State Democratic Party following his gubernatorial defeat. His influence over the party would wane, until in 1898 the now populist and left-wing aligned party would officially condemn him and his political career was, for the time, over. He would remain out of politics until his successful campaign for mayor of St. Paul, Minnesota in 1907. He served as mayor of Saint Paul from 1908 to 1910. In 1912, he ran for the United States Senate from Minnesota, losing once again to Nelson. He also unsuccessfully ran for the Senate in 1916, losing to future United States Secretary of State Frank B. Kellogg. Lawler was also a delegate to the Democratic National Convention that year.

Lawler died in Saint Paul and is buried in Calvary Cemetery there.

Party political offices
Preceded by Thomas Wilson	Democratic nominee for Governor of Minnesota; 1892	Succeeded by George Loomis Becker
First	Democratic nominee for U.S. Senator from Minnesota (Class 1); 1916	Succeeded by Anna Dickie Olesen
