= Knute Nelson =

American lawyer and politician (1843–1923)

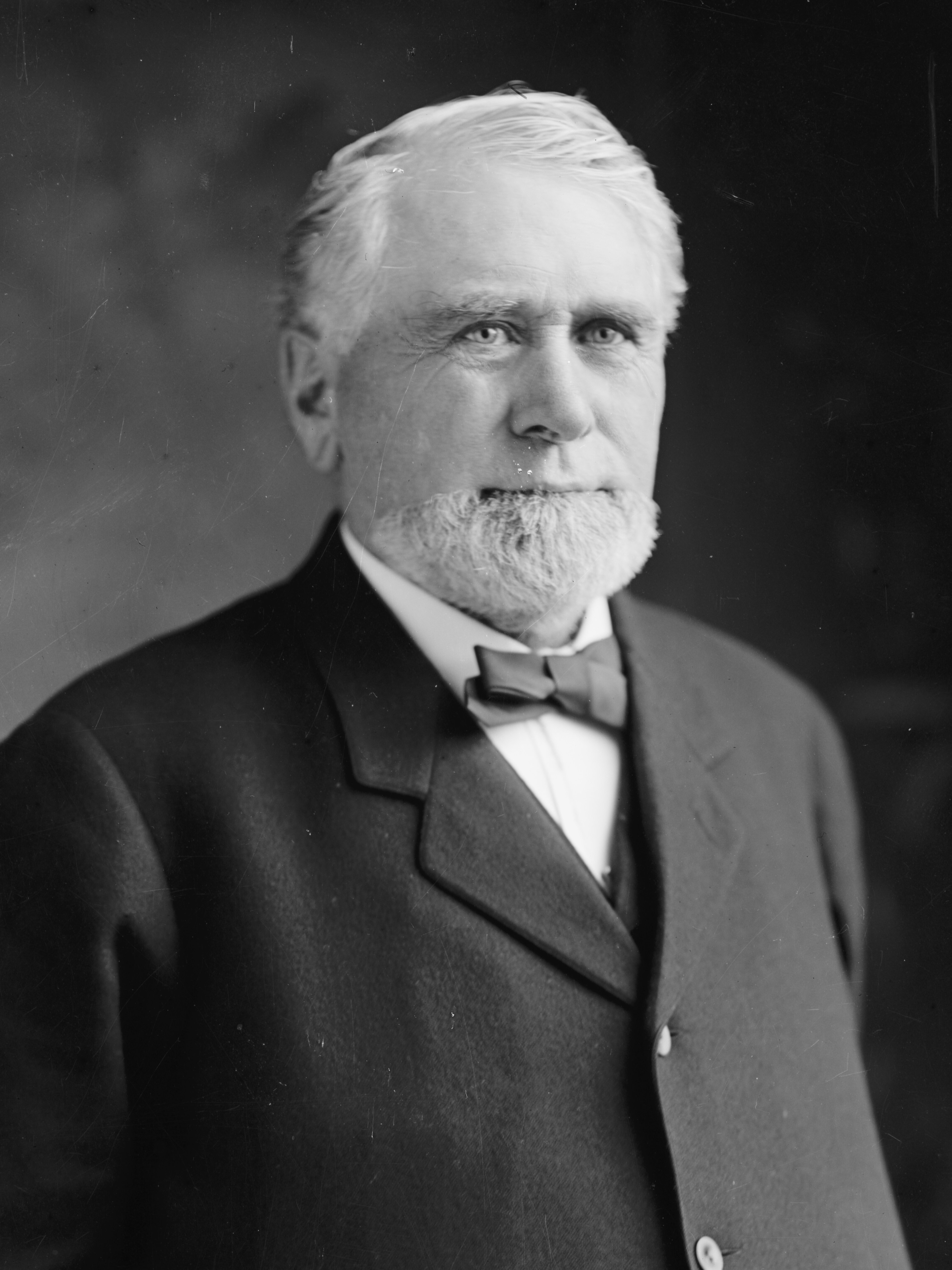
- Nelson in 1908

United States Senator from Minnesota
- In office March 4, 1895 – April 28, 1923
- Preceded by: William D. Washburn
- Succeeded by: Magnus Johnson

12th Governor of Minnesota
- In office January 4, 1893 – January 31, 1895
- Lieutenant: David Marston Clough
- Preceded by: William Rush Merriam
- Succeeded by: David Marston Clough

Member of the U.S. House of Representatives from Minnesota's 5th district
- In office March 4, 1883 – March 3, 1889
- Preceded by: Position established
- Succeeded by: Solomon Comstock

Member of the Minnesota Senate
- In office 1874–1878

Member of the Wisconsin State Assembly
- In office 1868–1869

Personal details
- Born: Knud Evanger; February 2, 1843 Voss, Sweden–Norway
- Died: April 28, 1923 (aged 80) Timonium, Maryland, U.S.
- Resting place: Kinkead Cemetery, Alexandria, Minnesota
- Party: Republican
- Other political affiliations: Democratic (before c. 1865)
- Spouse: Nicolinæ Jacobson
- Children: 5
- Education: Albion Academy, Albion, Wisconsin
- Profession: Lawyer

Military service
- Allegiance: United States (Union)
- Branch/service: Union Army
- Years of service: 1861-1865
- Rank: Corporal
- Unit: Black Hawk Rifles of Racine; 4th Wisconsin Infantry Regiment
- Battles/wars: American Civil War

Knute Nelson (born Knud Evanger; February 2, 1843 – April 28, 1923) was a Norwegian-born American attorney and politician active in Wisconsin and Minnesota. A Republican, he served in state and national positions: he was elected to the Wisconsin and Minnesota legislatures and to the U.S. House of Representatives and the United States Senate from Minnesota, and served as the 12th governor of Minnesota from 1893 to 1895. Having served in the Senate for 28 years, 55 days, he is the longest-serving Senator in Minnesota's history.

Nelson is known for promoting the Nelson Act of 1889 to consolidate Minnesota's Ojibwe/Chippewa on a reservation in western Minnesota and break up their communal land by allotting it to individual households, with sales of the remainder to anyone, including non-natives. This was similar to the Dawes Act of 1887, which applied to Native American lands in the Indian Territory.

== Early life and education ==
Knute Nelson was born out of wedlock in Evanger, near Voss, Norway, to Ingebjørg Haldorsdatter Kvilekval, who named him Knud Evanger. He was baptized by his uncle on their farm of Kvilekval, who recorded his father as Helge Knudsen Styve. This is unconfirmed. Various theories persist about Knud's paternity, including one involving Gjest Baardsen, a famous outlaw.

In 1843, Ingebjørg's brother Jon Haldorsson sold the farm where she and Knud lived, as he could not make a living, and emigrated to Chicago. Ingebjørg took Knud with her to Bergen, where she worked as a domestic servant. Having borrowed money for the passage, she and six-year-old Knud emigrated to the United States, arriving in Castle Garden in New York City on July 4, 1849. The holiday fireworks made a lasting impression on Knud, who was listed in immigration records as "Knud Helgeson Kvilekval". Ingebjørg Haldorsdatter claimed to be a widow (a story she stuck to until 1923). She and Knud traveled by the Hudson River to Albany, New York, and then via the Erie Canal to Buffalo.

They continued across the Great Lakes to Chicago. There her brother Jon, now working as a carpenter, took them in. While with him, Ingebjørg worked as a domestic servant and paid off her debt for passage in less than a year. Knud also worked, first as a house servant, then as a paperboy for the Chicago Free Press, which gave him an early education, both because he read the paper and because he learned street profanity.

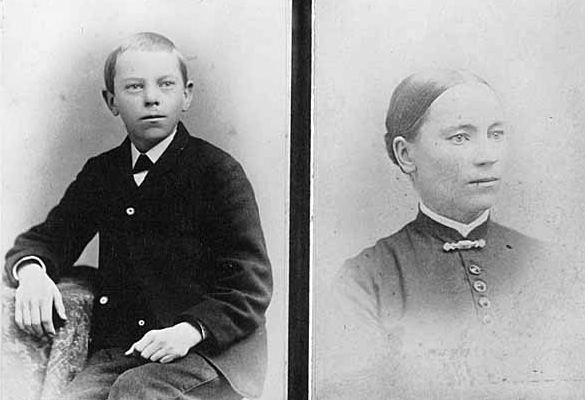
Knute Nelson, age 12, and his mother Ingebjørg Haldorsdatter Grotland, c. 1855.

In the fall of 1850, Ingebjørg married Nils Olson Grotland, also from Voss. The family of three moved to Skoponong, a Norwegian settlement in Palmyra, Wisconsin. Knud was given the surname Nelson after his stepfather, which eliminated the stigma of being fatherless.

By then 17 years old, Nelson was street-smart and rebellious, with a proclivity for profanity. He was accepted to the school held by Mary Blackwell Dillon, an Irish immigrant with linguistic talents. Nelson proved himself an apt though undisciplined student; he later recalled being whipped up to three times a day.

Still in his teens, Nelson joined the Democratic Party out of admiration for Stephen A. Douglas of Illinois. The family moved to the Koshkonong Settlement, which by 1850 had more than half of Wisconsin's Norwegian population of 5,000. Nils Olson had bad luck with land purchases and became sickly. Nelson picked up most of the work of the farm, but maintained his commitment to education. Olson was not supportive and Nelson often had to scrounge to find money for schoolbooks.

Nelson's academic interests led him to enroll in Albion Academy in Albion, Dane County, Wisconsin, in the fall of 1858. The school was founded by the Seventh-day Adventist Church to provide education to children who could not afford private school; Nelson was deemed "very deserving." To earn his keep he did various jobs around the school.

After two years, Nelson took a job as a country teacher in Pleasant Springs, near Stoughton. Teaching mostly other Norwegian immigrants, he was an agent of Americanization.

== Military service ==
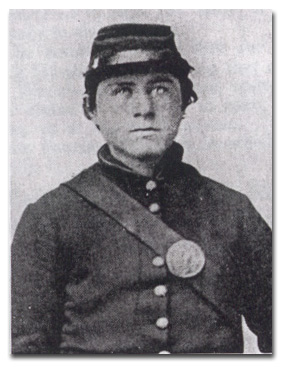
Civil war photograph of Nelson

Nelson returned to Albion in the spring of 1861, when the American Civil War had started. By then, he had developed his position as a "low-tariff, anti-slavery, pro-Union Democrat," but was in the minority in a pro-Abraham Lincoln region. In May 1861, he and 18 other Albion students enlisted in a state militia company known as the Black Hawk Rifles of Racine, to fight with the Union Army in the war. Appalled by its debauchery, the young men refused to be sworn into the army under this militia, and eventually succeeded in being transferred to the 4th Wisconsin Infantry Regiment. This was an "all-American" regiment, made up generally of native-born men.

Nelson's parents opposed his volunteering, but he saw it as his duty. He sent half his soldier's pay to his parents to help retire the debt on the farm. He seems to have enjoyed army life, noting that the food was better than at home. He shared his fellow soldiers' frustration at not being put into battle soon enough. His unit moved from Racine to Camp Dix near Baltimore, Maryland. From there they moved to combat operations in Louisiana.

On May 27, 1863, after the 4th Wisconsin became a cavalry unit, Nelson was wounded in the Battle of Port Hudson, captured and made a prisoner of war. He was released when the siege ended. He served as an adjutant, was promoted to corporal, and briefly considered applying for a lieutenant's commission.

Military service sharpened Nelson's identity as an American and his patriotism. He was deeply concerned about what he considered the ambivalent attitude among Norwegian-American Lutheran clergy toward slavery, and thought that too few of his fellow Norwegian Americans from Koshkonong had volunteered. He read the Norwegian translation of Esaias Tegnér's Friðþjófs saga ins frœkna and found it enthralling. Its unsentimental depiction of character and virtue he found to be a synthesis of his Norwegian heritage and American home.

Within two years after he mustered out, Nelson acquired his United States citizenship. His disdain for the Copperheads contributed to his becoming a Republican after the war.

== Political career ==
=== Local politics in Wisconsin ===
Nelson returned to Albion and completed his studies as one of the oldest students, graduating at the top of his class. He gave his first campaign speech of record on behalf of Lincoln, and drew praise from the faculty.

Deciding to become a lawyer, Nelson moved to Madison, where he studied law in the office of William F. Vilas, one of the few academically trained attorneys in the area. In the spring of 1867, Judge Philip L. Spooner admitted him to the Wisconsin bar.

Nelson opened his law practice in Madison, where he appealed to the Norwegian immigrant community, advertising in the Norwegian-language newspaper Emigranten. He also became Madison's unofficial representative of the Norwegian community. With Eli A. Spencer's help, he successfully ran for Dane County's seat in the Wisconsin State Assembly, starting its session on January 8, 1868.

He was reelected to a second term in the Assembly, as he had quickly learned how to get things done in politics. He got involved in a divisive debate about public and parochial schools in Norwegian communities, taking the "liberal" side that promoted public, non-sectarian schools rather than those run by Lutheran clergy. After his second term in the Assembly, Nelson decided not to run for a third.

== Marriage and family ==
After being elected the first time, Nelson married Nicholina Jacobsen, originally from Toten, Norway, in 1868. She was five months pregnant by the time of their marriage and, because of Nelson's poor relations with local Lutheran clergy, they were married by Justice of the Peace Lars Erdall in a private home.

A national recession limited the couple's financial success. While Nelson slept in his office in Madison during his legislative and professional career, Nicholina and the newborn Ida stayed with her family in Koshkonong.

The couple later settled in Alexandria, Minnesota, where Nelson established a law practice and became active in local politics. Nicholina died in 1871 at age 33. In 1875, Nelson married Hulda Benson, with whom he had additional children.

== Minnesota frontier ==
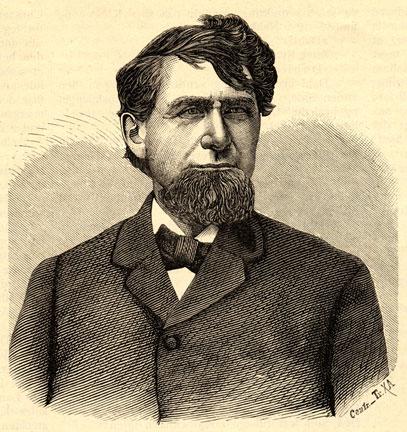
1882 print of Nelson

Nelson was already interested in moving further west when in 1870 he was invited by Lars K. Aaker to set up a practice in Alexandria, Minnesota, in Douglas County, part of the state's "Upper Country." Nelson was attracted by the possibilities afforded by the opening frontier, especially the prospect of the railroad. After also visiting Fergus Falls, he moved his wife and newborn son Henry to Alexandria in August 1871.

He was admitted to the Minnesota bar in October and set up a legal practice primarily around land cases referred to him by Aaker, the land agent. He also bought a 120-acre (0.49 km^{2}) homestead in Alexandria, a claim that was contested but which he won. He also became an accomplished trial lawyer, was elected the Douglas County attorney, and acted as the county attorney for Pope County. As was typically the case at that time, Nelson's legal work on land issues got him involved in political issues. He became a champion for the economic development of the Upper Country through the introduction of the railroad.

=== Minnesota state senator ===
The so-called "Aaker faction" within the Upper County Republican party found in Nelson a capable politician, with connections to the immigrant community, experience in land-office issues, and political background in Wisconsin. He was put forward as a Republican candidate for the Minnesota Senate in 1874, running against banker Francis Bennett Van Hoesen, who was aligned with the Grange movement and state Anti-Monopoly Party. Though Nelson did not get unanimous support from his Norwegian-American constituency, he carried 59% of the vote and four out of five counties in his constituency.

Nelson's first challenge in the state senate, whether to reelect Alexander Ramsey to a third term in the United States Senate, was contentious, as it was against Governor Cushman Davis's wishes. Nelson was caught between his allegiance to the Douglas County Republicans, who were staunch Davis supporters, and his land office constituency, who favored Ramsey. Nelson voted for Ramsey, the dark-horse candidate William D. Washburn, and finally for the victor, Samuel J. R. McMillan.

Nelson spent more time on the issue of extending the railroad infrastructure into the Upper Country. His constituents elected him in large part to resolve the gridlock that prevented the completion of the railroad extension from St. Cloud west to Alexandria and beyond. The railroad company, St. Paul and Pacific Railroad (SP&P), had run out of funds to complete the St. Vincent extension, and the bondholders were unwilling to invest further. The Minnesota legislature agreed on the need for the railroad but were not in a position to pay for its completion.

In 1875, Nelson introduced the Upper Country bill, which gave SP&P added incentives in the form of land to complete the line, but also imposed a deadline after which the rights to build the railroad were forfeited, presumably in favor of Northern Pacific, whose plans would bypass Alexandria. The bill met with controversy from both sides of the issue and was ultimately amended to the point that Nelson first sought to table it and then abstained from voting on it. The bill was enacted and was considered a success in its time, with most of the credit going to Nelson.

It took several years for the various financial and political matters to be sorted out for the railroad, and Nelson played an active role throughout, both as an elected official, attorney, and businessman. He secured rights-of-way for virtually the entire line from Alexandria to Fergus Falls, negotiating with many stakeholders for every tract of land. This proved to be an all-consuming effort for several years, though he ran unsuccessfully for lieutenant governor of Minnesota in 1879.

In May 1877, three of Nelson's five children died during a diphtheria epidemic. The two oldest, Ida and Henry, survived.

In November 1878, the railroad finally reached Alexandria, thanks in large part to Nelson's close working relationship with James J. Hill. Several Minnesota towns were founded as a result of these efforts, including Nelson and Ashby.

=== National politics ===
Nelson was invited to deliver the "oration of the day" at the United States Centennial on July 4, 1876, in Alexandria, exactly 27 years after he had immigrated to the United States. The "unimpassioned" speech sought to reinforce an American identity and made no mention of his Norwegian roots. It coincided with his campaign for U.S. representative from Minnesota's third district.

By then, Nelson had developed the strategy of orchestrating a "bottoms-up" campaign in which he would quietly enlist supporters to publicly encourage him to run, while appearing reluctant. His constituency in the Upper Country frontier put him at a disadvantage with respect to the rivaling Twin Cities. After having flexed his political muscle by "bolting" from the campaign for a few weeks, he supported the Republican nomination of Jacob Stewart, a medical doctor from St. Paul, who won the election against Democrat William McNair. This endorsement was not backed by the Norwegian-American community, who were concerned about Stewart's association with the Know Nothing Party and the apparent rise of a ruling class in society.

=== The battle for the "Bloody Fifth" ===
As a result of the 1880 census, the United States Congress decided to allocate a new congressional seat to the Upper Country, creating the Fifth Minnesota District. Nelson quietly entered the race for this seat. First he secured a seat on the Board of Regents at the University of Minnesota, where he managed to establish a Department of Scandinavian Studies.

The campaign opened in 1882 and quickly devolved into one of the most contentious elections in history at that point. The contest between Nelson and Charles F. Kindred for the "Bloody Fifth", as it became known, involved widespread graft, intimidation, and election fraud. The Republican convention on July 12 in Detroit Lakes was compared to the historic Battle of the Boyne in Ireland. 150 delegates fought over 80 seats, and after a scuffle in the main conference center, the Kindred and Nelson campaigns nominated their candidates.

The rivalry between Kindred and Nelson centered to a large extent on the two competing railroads in the Upper Country, the Northern Pacific in Kindred's corner and the Great Northern in Nelson's. Kindred spent between $150,000 and $200,000, but Nelson won handily, overcoming massive election fraud in Northern Pacific counties.

=== U.S. House of Representatives, 1883–1889 ===
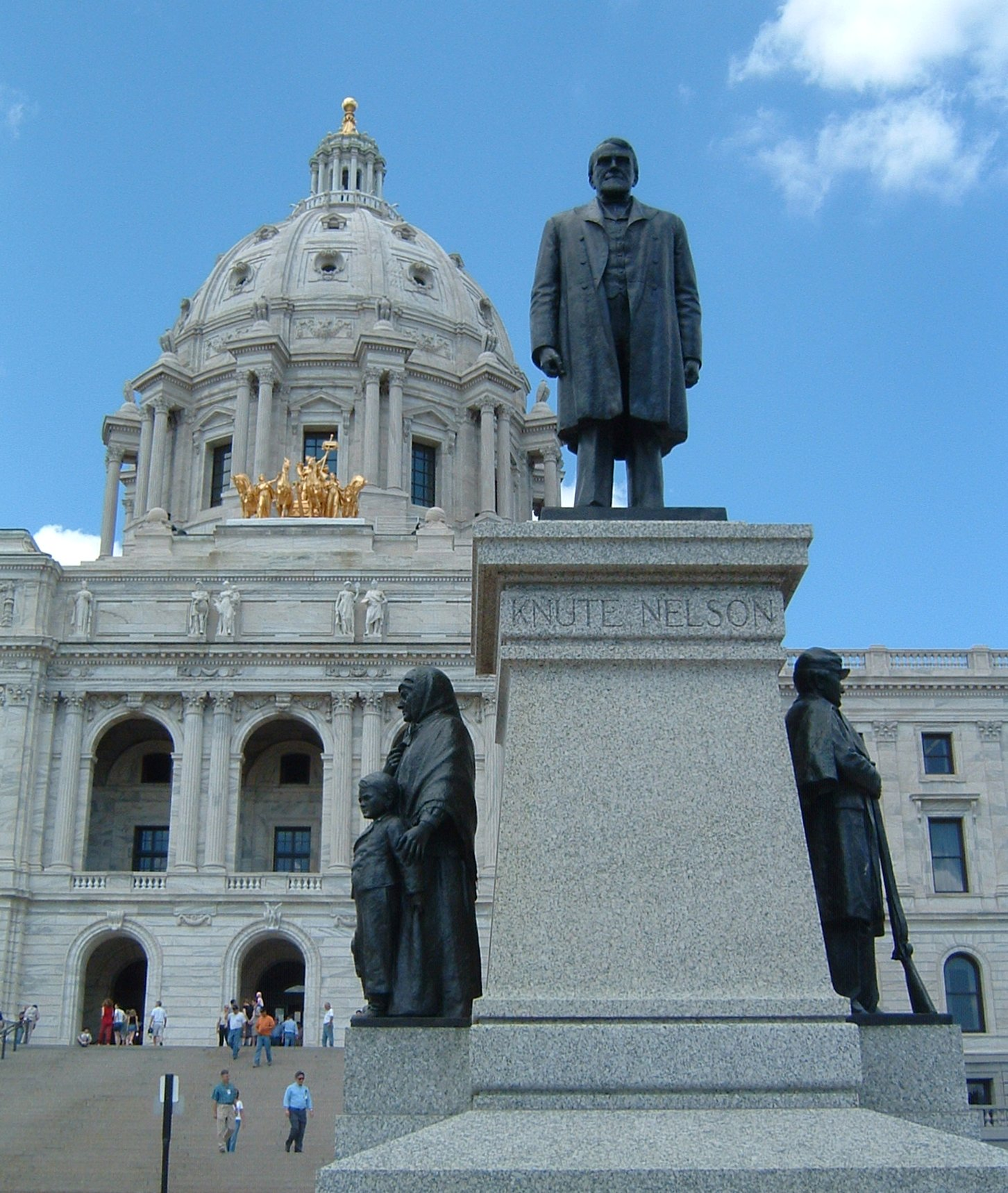
A statue of Nelson stands in front of the Minnesota State Capitol

Nelson served in the United States House of Representatives from March 4, 1883, to March 4, 1889, in the 48th, 49th, and 50th congresses. In keeping with practices of the Gilded Age, his first agenda item in Congress was to ensure patronage for his supporters in Minnesota by doling out the limited number of federal appointments available. Most were made through Paul C. Sletten, the Receiver of the U.S. Land Office in Crookston. In addition to rewarding political support, he replaced pro-Kindred appointees in the forested counties around the Northern Pacific Railroad, the so-called "Pineries." Particularly publicized was the firing of Søren Listoe as Register of the U.S. Land Office in Fergus Falls.

Nelson did not always follow the orthodox Republican line in the House. In 1886, he abandoned the Republican caucus to vote for the Morrison Tariff Bill of 1886, which sought to reduce the tariffs on some imported items. Two years later, he and three other Republicans voted for the more aggressive tariff reductions in the Mills Tariff Bill of 1888. Although passed by the House on July 21, 1888, the Mills Bill was so heavily amended by the high-tariff Republicans in the Senate that the House found the result unacceptable, and no changes to the tariff were made in 1888.

Nelson was frustrated by what he perceived as the House's lack of effectiveness. He got involved in long debates about pension issues for Civil War veterans. His most notable legacy as a representative was passing the Nelson Act of 1889. It created the White Earth Indian Reservation in western Minnesota as a place to consolidate Native Americans from other reservations in the state, allocated communal land to heads of households, and opened up sale of the remaining thousands of acres of land to immigrants, at Native Americans' expense.

Considering his time in the House a "personal failure", Nelson decided not to seek reelection in 1888. Some suspect that a narrow escape from a drowning accident on October 11, 1886, also played a role in increasing his ambition.

=== Governor of Minnesota, 1893–1895 ===
Though Nelson claimed to retire from politics, he remained an active insider in Minnesota Republican politics. 1890, Nelson made his first attempt to run for governor. After declining an offer to run for the Farmer's Alliance, he chose to challenge incumbent William Rush Merriam in the Republican primary and lost. Meanwhile, he resumed an active law practice from Alexandria, continued running his farm, and opened a hardware store.

Increasing pressure on the Minnesotan agricultural economy gave rise to the Farmers' Alliance, which became a formidable political force in both parties, but especially the Republican Party. In 1890, the alliance voted to run its own candidates, and suggested nominating Nelson. In the Minnesota alliance convention in July 1890, Nelson did not acknowledge interest from the delegates, who ended up nominating Sidney M. Owen. But after the Alliance made a strong showing in the 1890 legislative election, Republicans saw Nelson as a strong alternative to the Alliance in the Upper Country.

Nelson worked to strengthen his candidacy for governor, though historians suggest that his ultimate goal was the U.S. Senate. He arranged to be drafted as a candidate rather than actively pursuing office. Appointed officeholders, fearing the loss of patronage to Alliance political victories, were glad to support him. Appealing to the Republican need for unity at the convention, Nelson maneuvered to gain the support of rivals such as Davis and Washburn, or at least avoid their opposition. He was unanimously nominated by 709 delegates as the Republican candidate for governor on July 28, 1892, at the St. Paul People's Church. His acceptance speech was a libertarian broadside against both Democrats and Populists; it emboldened the delegates for the campaign.

The ensuing campaign against Democratic nominee Daniel Lawler and Populist Ignatius Donnelly centered on allegations of undue influence by railroad interests, tariffs, and ethnicity and patriotism. When Nelson took the campaign to northwestern Minnesota, he had a minor physical altercation with Tobias Sawby, a local populist. After a grueling campaign, he carried 51 of 80 counties with 42.6% of the vote to Lawler's 37% and Donnelly's 15.6%. He gave a short victory speech in Alexandria, saying, "I go in without having made any promises to any combine, corporation, or person, and shall endeavor to do right, because it is right, and I endeavor to give an administration for the people, for the people, and by the people."

There were significant limitations on Governor Nelson's ability to pursue his agenda. The balance of power in Minnesota was shared among five independently elected officials, the state legislature, and the governor. In his inaugural speech on January 4, 1893, he presented himself as a fiscal conservative with an affinity for education and dwelled on statistics related to various state services and for solutions.

Nelson used his governorship as a bully pulpit for modest Republican reforms intended to provide moderate alternatives to the radical Populist actions. He promoted the "Governor's Grain Bill" as a way to regulate trade in grain, specifically by giving the Railroad and Warehouse Commission the authority to license, inspect, and regulate country grain elevators. Republican members of the legislature supported it as well, going so far as making it a party measure. Opposition to the bill from Democrats and Populists was based on suspicion of the railroad commission. The bill went through two rounds of voting with considerable horse-trading but in the end won narrowly, giving Nelson credibility as a political force.

Nelson also ended up cooperating with his former adversary Donnelly on the "timber ring" investigation; it sought to end land claim fraud in lumber areas. Nelson convened an interstate antitrust Conference in Chicago on June 5, 1893, where he spoke against the lumber trust and in favor of strengthening the Sherman Antitrust Act of 1890.

The Panic of 1893 created a crisis for the railroad companies. After a series of wage cuts by the Great Northern, the American Railway Union went on strike on April 13. Nelson suggested the parties engage in arbitration while demanding law and order from the strikers. He left enforcement to federal marshals and arbitration to private business leaders. The strike was resolved largely in favor of the workers, and Nelson survived untarnished.

Nelson was handily renominated in 1894, and ran against Populist Sidney Owen and Democrat George Becker. He projected the image of a systematic and scientific reformer compared to such populist speakers as Mary Ellen Lease and Jerry Simpson. He demonstrated hands-on leadership in the dry summer of 1894, when the Great Hinckley Fire spread across east-central Minnesota on September 1. Although the state did not have the financial means to provide direct support, Nelson used his office to encourage private relief efforts. He won the election with 60,000 more votes than Owen.

=== United States Senator, 1895–1923 ===
==== Nelson vs. Washburn ====
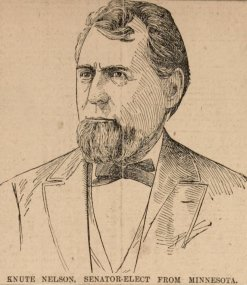
Sketch portrait of Nelson as Senator-elect

Nelson's campaign for election to the United States Senate was reported to have begun early in 1894. It was conducted quietly and behind the scenes, to avoid the appearance that his bid for governorship was less than genuine, and to avoid an internal Republican feud with incumbent U.S. Senator William D. Washburn. Before the 17th Amendment went into effect in 1914, state legislatures elected their U.S. senators. Nelson's campaign for Senate was a "still hunt," consisting of building support among incoming legislators while letting Washburn think he was running unopposed for the Republican nomination.

Sensing Nelson's rising star in the Republican establishment, Washburn tried to obtain Nelson's unequivocal assurance that he was not running for Senate, while solidifying his own standing as the Minneapolis candidate. On September 21, 1894, the two candidates met at the Freeborn county fair in Albert Lea, where Nelson was asked directly whether he supported Washburn's candidacy or had his own designs on the seat. He reportedly advised the state legislature to "elect your Republican legislative ticket, so as to send my friend Washburn back the United States senate, or if you do not like him, send some other good Republican."

Nelson's strategy was to prevent Washburn from gaining a straightforward majority in either the nomination or the election in the Republican caucus, and to appear as a unifying choice for the Republicans. He had to strike a fine balance between appealing to Scandinavian ethnic pride on the one hand and affirming himself a true American on the other, and between the appearance of treachery against Washburn and maintaining an honest impression.

The campaign came to a head in the so-called "Three-Week War" or "Hotel Campaign", which was in full force by January 5, 1895. The confrontations, lobbying, cajoling, and alleged bribery centered on St. Paul's Windsor and Merchants hotels. Legislators were unnerved by the campaign, and the outcome remained uncertain. Return visits to their constituencies in mid-January did little to clarify public opinion. Public meetings with "wirepullers" had similarly little effect.

Nelson's strength became apparent but was not yet decisive on January 18 when the Republicans caucused. Washburn fell well short of reaching the necessary 72 votes, and a number of erstwhile supporters fell to Nelson on the second ballot. By the time the election went to the full legislature, it was clear that Washburn had lost. On January 23 Nelson was elected to the United States Senate, the first Scandinavian-born American to reach this post. Exhausted from the campaign, Washburn called for direct, popular elections of senators. It is remembered as one of the bitterest elections in Minnesota political history.

Washburn was perceived as a wealthy, urban, aristocratic native Yankee from Maine, and Nelson as a hard-working immigrant from the Upper Country. Nelson's victory reinforced the growing influence of areas of Minnesota outside the Twin Cities, and strengthened political awareness among ethnic Scandinavians in the region. Nelson decided early to make this image his platform, asking his constituency to call him "Uncle Knute."

==== First Senate term ====
The 54th United States Congress did not convene until December 1895, and though Nelson was eager to get to work, he spent the recess traveling and working on his farm. He also translated the Constitution of Norway to English and studied the Free Silver issue. This was the subject of his first Senate speech, on December 31, 1895, when he advocated a paper currency.

Nelson maintained—as he did throughout his career—a strong anti-Populist, though pragmatic, profile. His most important first-term accomplishment was probably the Nelson Bankruptcy Law, intended to give farmers the means to enter into voluntary, as opposed to forced, bankruptcy by creditors. He positioned this as an alternative to the Judiciary Committee that was much harsher to debtors. Although he championed the bill on its own merits, it also gave him an opportunity both to disassociate himself from his background as an attorney and to build favor with his agricultural constituency. After 18 months of painstaking negotiations, Nelson managed to get the bill passed by Congress on June 24, 1898. Filing bankruptcy would be known for some time afterwards as "taking the Nelson cure."

If Nelson showed independence in the bankruptcy law, he toed the party line on the Spanish–American War, enthusiastically supporting the war effort. He got embroiled in a bitter debate on the Senate floor on the issue of annexing the Philippines and Hawaii. He and one of the authors of the treaty, senior Minnesota senator Cushman Davis, voted with the majority in ratifying the Treaty of Paris. He is often quoted as saying:

Providence has given the United States the duty of extending Christian civilization. We come as ministering angels, not despots.

==== Return to Norway ====
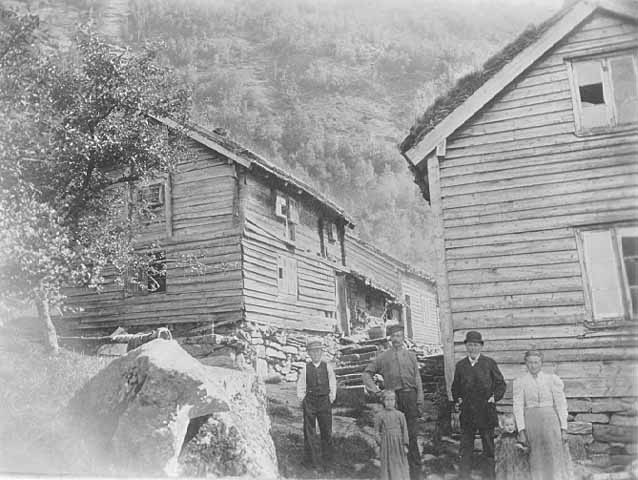
Nelson in Voss, Norway.

Nelson always took care in public to define himself first and foremost as an American, with no conflicted loyalty to his birth country. But in the background he supported Norway in various ways, notably by inviting Norwegian officers to observe and learn from American tactics in Cuba. He had been planning a trip to Norway for some time, but made sure he would also visit Sweden and Denmark, emphasizing his Scandinavian-American background.

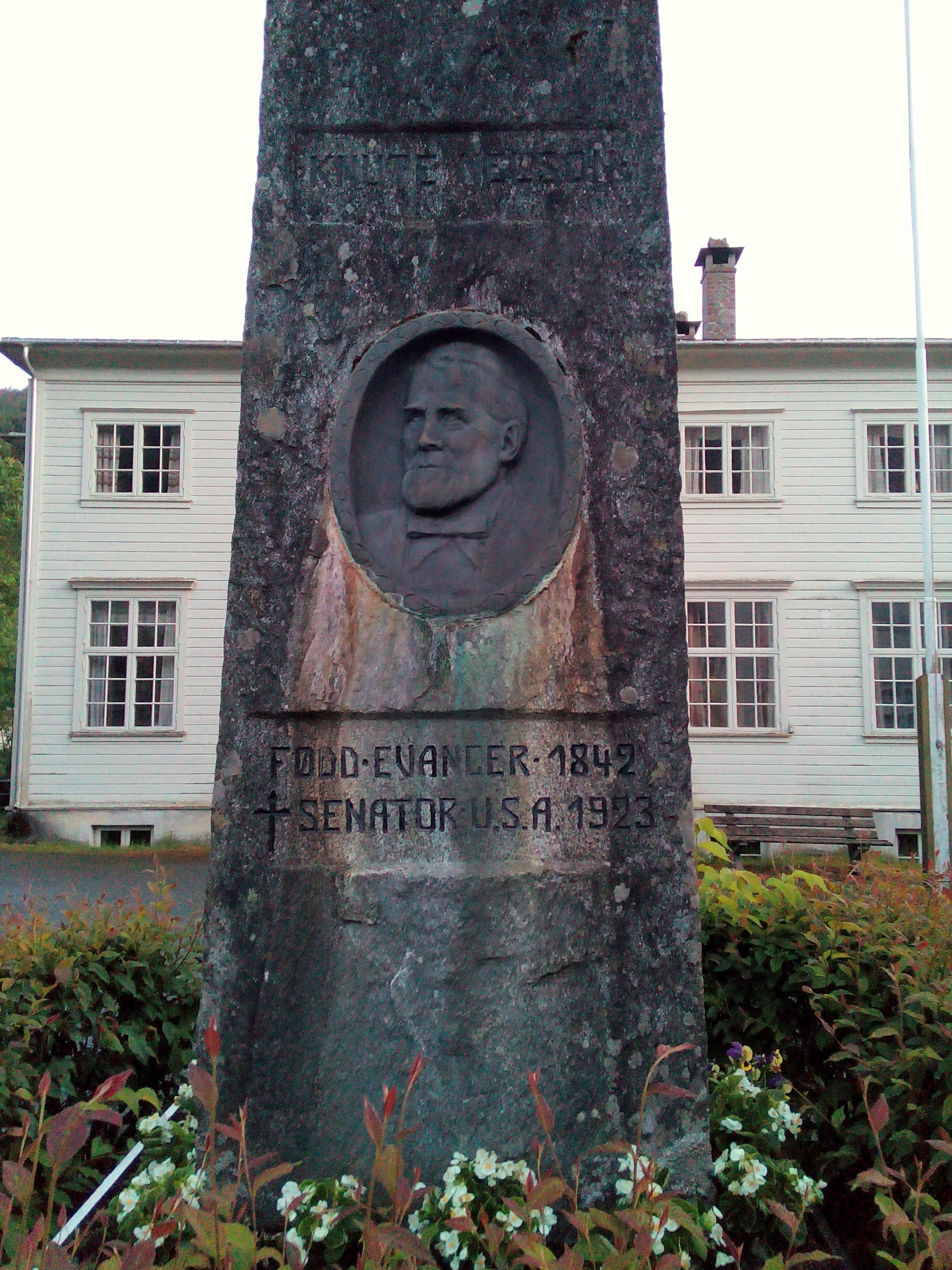
Knute Nelson memorial sign in Evanger

He traveled alone and made his home town of Evanger one of the first stops. He arrived at the village in a horse-drawn buggy with only his luggage and was received as an honored guest. He spoke in his native dialect of Vossemål, slipping into Riksmål only when he felt it necessary to make an important political point. His hosts quickly started addressing him in the familiar "du Knut," which he appeared to enjoy.

From Evanger, Nelson traveled to Kristiania, where he refused official honors, and to Stockholm, where he made even less fuss. He spent a week in Copenhagen, visiting with his own patronage appointees Laurits S. Swenson, U.S. ambassador to Denmark, and Søren Listoe, consul to Rotterdam. He had an audience with King Christian IX and a formal dinner hosted by Swenson. He traveled through the contentious area of Schleswig-Holstein and the site of the Battle of Waterloo.

Nelson traveled home via England and happened to be in the visitors' gallery in the British parliament on October 17 when Queen Victoria convened an extraordinary session to debate the Second Boer War.

==== 1900–1902 reelection campaign ====
Owing, once again, to his being elected by the state legislature, Nelson's campaign for reelection in 1902 started with the Minnesota state legislature elections of 1900. His strategy was to align himself with celebrated national leaders, especially Theodore Roosevelt and Robert M. La Follette Sr., as they swung through the state campaigning for William McKinley. Nelson was known more for thoroughness than charisma in his campaigns, but contributed significantly to the Republican success that year. Nelson's son Henry Knute Nelson was elected to the Minnesota state legislature that year.

Nelson's reelection to a second Senate term was assured for all practical purposes. The campaign continued into 1902, when Nelson made a name for himself by commandeering a handcar when his train broke down east of Hibbing, Minnesota. He made his own way to Wolf Junction, Minnesota at a brisk pace.

Until that point, Nelson's political career was largely based on the issues of an unfolding economic frontier, with land development, immigration, and Gilded Age dynamics. With the birth of the Progressive Era, the winds of reform started blowing more from the east than the west, and urban issues came more to the forefront. As a result, Nelson had to reinvent his political strategy.

In the crosswinds of the political movements of the time, Nelson chose a largely "moderate progressive" profile, accepting government intervention on some issues (such as antitrust matters) but opposing anything that smacked of socialism. He eased up on patronage as a political tool and focused instead on helping his constituents in matters small and large, often invoking the image of himself as a "drayhorse"—a hard-working, persistent advocate for the things and people he believed in.

==== Territories and statehood ====
In the Senate, Nelson was involved in creating the Department of Commerce and Labor and the 1898 passage of the Nelson Bankruptcy Act, and served on the Overman Committee from 1918 to 1919. Serving from 1895 to 1923, he was a senator from the 54th through the 67th congresses. He was an active senator until his death in 1923 en route by train from Washington, D.C., to his hometown of Alexandria, where he was buried.

== See also ==
- Knute Nelson Memorial Park
- List of United States senators born outside the United States
- List of members of the United States Congress who died in office (1900–1949)
- List of United States governors born outside the United States

Party political offices
| Preceded by William Rush Merriam | Republican nominee for Governor of Minnesota; 1892, 1894 | Succeeded by David Marston Clough |
| First | Republican nominee for U.S. Senator from Minnesota (Class 2); 1918 | Succeeded by J. A. O. Preus |
U.S. House of Representatives
| New district | Member of the U.S. House of Representatives from Minnesota's 5th congressional district 1883–1889 | Succeeded by Solomon Comstock |
Political offices
| Preceded by William Rush Merriam | Governor of Minnesota; 1893–1895 | Succeeded by David Marston Clough |
| Preceded by Charles A. Culberson | Chairman of the Senate Judiciary Committee; 1919–1923 | Succeeded by Frank B. Brandegee |
U.S. Senate
| Preceded by William D. Washburn | U.S. senator (Class 2) from Minnesota; 1895–1923; Served alongside: Cushman Davis, Charles A. Towne, Moses E. Clapp, Frank B. Kellogg, Henrik Shipstead | Succeeded by Magnus Johnson |
