= List of governors of Minnesota =

The governor of Minnesota is the head of government of the U.S. state of Minnesota. The governor is the head of the executive branch of Minnesota's state government and is charged with enforcing state laws.

There have been 41 governors of the state; one, Rudy Perpich, served non-consecutive terms. Minnesota Territory had three governors appointed by the president of the United States; the first, Alexander Ramsey, would later be state governor.

A total of five political parties have had governors as members. The Minnesota Democratic Party, the Republican Party of Minnesota, the Minnesota Farmer–Labor Party, the Minnesota Democratic–Farmer–Labor Party, and the Independence Party of Minnesota. There have been twenty-six Republicans, six DFLers, four Democrats, three Farmer-Laborites, and one Independence Party member. One Democrat, John Lind, was elected on a fusion ticket with the Populist Party.

The current governor is Tim Walz, a member of the Democratic-Farmer-Labor Party, who took office on January 7, 2019.

== List of governors ==
=== Minnesota Territory ===
Minnesota Territory was organized on March 3, 1849. The secretary of the territory would act as governor in the governor's absence; notably, secretary Charles L. Chase acted as governor from October 13, 1857 until the elected state officials took office on May 24, 1858.

Governors of the Territory of Minnesota
No.	Governor	Term in office (Note: The range given is from the date the governor was confirmed by the Senate, or appointed by the President during a Senate recess, to the date the governor's successor was confirmed, unless noted.)	Appointed by
1	Alexander Ramsey (1815–1903)	June 1, 1849 (Note: Edward W. McGaughey was nominated on March 15, 1849, but was rejected by the Senate on March 19. William Pennington was then nominated on March 21, and confirmed by the Senate on March 22, but declined the post. Ramsey was appointed on April 2, during a Senate recess; nominated on December 21, and confirmed by the Senate on January 9, 1850. He arrived in the territory on May 27, 1849.) – April 1, 1853 (1401 days; replaced)	Zachary Taylor
2	Willis A. Gorman (1816–1876)	April 1, 1853 (Note: Gorman was nominated on March 31, 1853, confirmed by the Senate on April 1, and arrived in the territory on May 13.) – March 13, 1857 (1443 days; replaced)	Franklin Pierce
3	Samuel Medary (1801–1864)	March 13, 1857 (Note: Medary was nominated March 12, 1857, confirmed by the Senate on March 13, and arrived in the territory on April 22.) – May 24, 1858 (438 days; statehood)	James Buchanan

=== State of Minnesota ===
Minnesota was admitted to the Union on May 11, 1858.

The Minnesota Constitution of 1858 created the offices of governor and lieutenant governor, elected separately to two-year terms; these were lengthened to four years starting in 1963. As of 1974, the governor and lieutenant governor are elected on the same ticket.

Governors of the State of Minnesota
No.	Governor	Term in office	Party	Election	Lt. Governor (Note: Lieutenant governors represented the same party as their governor unless noted.)
1	Henry Hastings Sibley (1811–1891)	May 24, 1858 – January 2, 1860 (589 days; retired)	Democratic	1857	William Holcombe
2	Alexander Ramsey (1815–1903)	January 2, 1860 – July 10, 1863 (1286 days; resigned) (Note: Ramsey resigned, having been elected to the United States Senate.)	Republican	1859	Ignatius L. Donnelly (resigned March 3, 1863)
2	Alexander Ramsey (1815–1903)	January 2, 1860 – July 10, 1863 (1286 days; resigned)	Republican	1861	Ignatius L. Donnelly (resigned March 3, 1863)
2	Alexander Ramsey (1815–1903)	January 2, 1860 – July 10, 1863 (1286 days; resigned)	Republican	1861	Henry Adoniram Swift
3	Henry Adoniram Swift (1823–1869)	July 10, 1863 (Note: Modern sources state Ramsey resigned July 10, 1863, despite his having taken office in the U.S. Senate on March 12, 1863. Contemporary news indicates he resigned at the end of June; it is assumed this is when he submitted his resignation, to take effect July 10.) – January 13, 1864 (188 days; retired) (Note: Swift was instead reelected to the Minnesota Senate.)	Republican	Succeeded from lieutenant governor	Vacant
4	Stephen Miller (1816–1881)	January 13, 1864 (Note: Nearly every source says Miller took office on January 11, but the journal of the House of Representatives says it was January 13.) – January 8, 1866 (727 days; retired)	Republican	1863	Charles D. Sherwood
5	William Rainey Marshall (1825–1896)	January 8, 1866 – January 7, 1870 (1461 days; retired)	Republican	1865	Thomas H. Armstrong
5	William Rainey Marshall (1825–1896)	January 8, 1866 – January 7, 1870 (1461 days; retired)	Republican	1867	Thomas H. Armstrong
6	Horace Austin (1831–1905)	January 7, 1870 – January 9, 1874 (1464 days; lost nomination)	Republican	1869	William H. Yale
6	Horace Austin (1831–1905)	January 7, 1870 – January 9, 1874 (1464 days; lost nomination)	Republican	1871	William H. Yale
7	Cushman K. Davis (1838–1900)	January 9, 1874 – January 7, 1876 (729 days; retired)	Republican	1873	Alphonso Barto
8	John S. Pillsbury (1827–1901)	January 7, 1876 – January 9, 1882 (2195 days; retired)	Republican	1875	James Wakefield
8	John S. Pillsbury (1827–1901)	January 7, 1876 – January 9, 1882 (2195 days; retired)	Republican	1877	James Wakefield
8	John S. Pillsbury (1827–1901)	January 7, 1876 – January 9, 1882 (2195 days; retired)	Republican	1879	Charles A. Gilman
9	Lucius Frederick Hubbard (1836–1913)	January 9, 1882 – January 5, 1887 (1823 days; retired)	Republican	1881	Charles A. Gilman
9	Lucius Frederick Hubbard (1836–1913)	January 9, 1882 – January 5, 1887 (1823 days; retired)	Republican	1883	Charles A. Gilman
10	Andrew Ryan McGill (1840–1905)	January 5, 1887 – January 9, 1889 (736 days; lost nomination)	Republican	1886	Albert E. Rice
11	William Rush Merriam (1849–1931)	January 9, 1889 – January 4, 1893 (1457 days; retired)	Republican	1888	Albert E. Rice
11	William Rush Merriam (1849–1931)	January 9, 1889 – January 4, 1893 (1457 days; retired)	Republican	1890	Gideon S. Ives
12	Knute Nelson (1843–1923)	January 4, 1893 – January 31, 1895 (758 days; resigned) (Note: Nelson resigned, having been elected to the United States Senate.)	Republican	1892	David Marston Clough
12	Knute Nelson (1843–1923)	January 4, 1893 – January 31, 1895 (758 days; resigned)	Republican	1894	David Marston Clough
13	David Marston Clough (1846–1924)	January 31, 1895 – January 2, 1899 (1433 days; retired)	Republican	Succeeded from lieutenant governor	Vacant
13	David Marston Clough (1846–1924)	January 31, 1895 – January 2, 1899 (1433 days; retired)	Republican	1896	John L. Gibbs
14	John Lind (1854–1930)	January 2, 1899 – January 7, 1901 (736 days; lost election)	Democratic (Note: Lind was also endorsed by the Populist Party.)	1898	Lyndon A. Smith (Note: Represented the Republican Party.)
15	Samuel Rinnah Van Sant (1844–1936)	January 7, 1901 – January 4, 1905 (1459 days; retired)	Republican	1900	Lyndon A. Smith
15	Samuel Rinnah Van Sant (1844–1936)	January 7, 1901 – January 4, 1905 (1459 days; retired)	Republican	1902	Ray W. Jones
16	John Albert Johnson (1861–1909)	January 4, 1905 – September 21, 1909 (1722 days; died in office)	Democratic	1904	Ray W. Jones
16	John Albert Johnson (1861–1909)	January 4, 1905 – September 21, 1909 (1722 days; died in office)	Democratic	1906	Adolph Olson Eberhart
16	John Albert Johnson (1861–1909)	January 4, 1905 – September 21, 1909 (1722 days; died in office)	Democratic	1908	Adolph Olson Eberhart
17	Adolph Olson Eberhart (1870–1944)	September 21, 1909 – January 6, 1915 (1934 days; lost nomination) (Note: Eberhart lost the Republican nomination to William E. Lee.)	Republican	Succeeded from lieutenant governor	Vacant
17	Adolph Olson Eberhart (1870–1944)	September 21, 1909 – January 6, 1915 (1934 days; lost nomination)	Republican	1910	Samuel Y. Gordon
17	Adolph Olson Eberhart (1870–1944)	September 21, 1909 – January 6, 1915 (1934 days; lost nomination)	Republican	1912	Joseph A. A. Burnquist
18	Winfield Scott Hammond (1863–1915)	January 6, 1915 – December 30, 1915 (359 days; died in office)	Democratic	1914	Joseph A. A. Burnquist
19	Joseph A. A. Burnquist (1879–1961)	December 30, 1915 – January 5, 1921 (1834 days; retired)	Republican	Succeeded from lieutenant governor	Vacant
19	Joseph A. A. Burnquist (1879–1961)	December 30, 1915 – January 5, 1921 (1834 days; retired)	Republican	1916	Thomas Frankson
19	Joseph A. A. Burnquist (1879–1961)	December 30, 1915 – January 5, 1921 (1834 days; retired)	Republican	1918	Thomas Frankson
20	J. A. O. Preus (1883–1961)	January 5, 1921 – January 7, 1925 (1464 days; retired)	Republican	1920	Louis L. Collins
20	J. A. O. Preus (1883–1961)	January 5, 1921 – January 7, 1925 (1464 days; retired)	Republican	1922	Louis L. Collins
21	Theodore Christianson (1883–1948)	January 7, 1925 – January 7, 1931 (2192 days; retired)	Republican	1924	William I. Nolan
21	Theodore Christianson (1883–1948)	January 7, 1925 – January 7, 1931 (2192 days; retired)	Republican	1926	William I. Nolan
21	Theodore Christianson (1883–1948)	January 7, 1925 – January 7, 1931 (2192 days; retired)	Republican	1928	Charles Edward Adams
22	Floyd B. Olson (1891–1936)	January 7, 1931 – August 22, 1936 (2055 days; died in office)	Farmer-Labor	1930	Henry M. Arens
22	Floyd B. Olson (1891–1936)	January 7, 1931 – August 22, 1936 (2055 days; died in office)	Farmer-Labor	1932	Konrad K. Solberg
22	Floyd B. Olson (1891–1936)	January 7, 1931 – August 22, 1936 (2055 days; died in office)	Farmer-Labor	1934	Hjalmar Petersen
23	Hjalmar Petersen (1890–1968)	August 22, 1936 – January 4, 1937 (136 days; retired)	Farmer-Labor	Succeeded from lieutenant governor	Vacant
24	Elmer A. Benson (1895–1985)	January 4, 1937 – January 3, 1939 (731 days; lost election)	Farmer-Labor	1936	Gottfrid Lindsten
25	Harold Stassen (1907–2001)	January 3, 1939 – April 27, 1943 (1605 days; resigned) (Note: Stassen resigned to serve in the United States Navy Reserve.)	Republican	1938	C. Elmer Anderson
25	Harold Stassen (1907–2001)	January 3, 1939 – April 27, 1943 (1605 days; resigned)	Republican	1940	C. Elmer Anderson
25	Harold Stassen (1907–2001)	January 3, 1939 – April 27, 1943 (1605 days; resigned)	Republican	1942	Edward J. Thye
26	Edward J. Thye (1896–1969)	April 27, 1943 – January 8, 1947 (1323 days; retired) (Note: Thye was instead elected to the United States Senate.)	Republican	Succeeded from lieutenant governor	Vacant
26	Edward J. Thye (1896–1969)	April 27, 1943 – January 8, 1947 (1323 days; retired)	Republican	1944	C. Elmer Anderson
27	Luther Youngdahl (1896–1978)	January 8, 1947 – September 27, 1951 (1724 days; resigned) (Note: Youngdahl resigned, having been confirmed to the United States District Court for the District of Columbia.)	Republican	1946	C. Elmer Anderson
27	Luther Youngdahl (1896–1978)	January 8, 1947 – September 27, 1951 (1724 days; resigned)	Republican	1948	C. Elmer Anderson
27	Luther Youngdahl (1896–1978)	January 8, 1947 – September 27, 1951 (1724 days; resigned)	Republican	1950	C. Elmer Anderson
28	C. Elmer Anderson (1912–1998)	September 27, 1951 – January 5, 1955 (1197 days; lost election)	Republican	Succeeded from lieutenant governor	Vacant
28	C. Elmer Anderson (1912–1998)	September 27, 1951 – January 5, 1955 (1197 days; lost election)	Republican	1952	Ancher Nelsen
28	C. Elmer Anderson (1912–1998)	September 27, 1951 – January 5, 1955 (1197 days; lost election)	Republican	1952	Donald O. Wright
29	Orville Freeman (1918–2003)	January 5, 1955 – January 4, 1961 (2192 days; lost election)	Democratic- Farmer-Labor	1954	Karl Rolvaag (Note: Represented the Democratic–Farmer–Labor Party.)
29	Orville Freeman (1918–2003)	January 5, 1955 – January 4, 1961 (2192 days; lost election)	Democratic- Farmer-Labor	1956	Karl Rolvaag
29	Orville Freeman (1918–2003)	January 5, 1955 – January 4, 1961 (2192 days; lost election)	Democratic- Farmer-Labor	1958	Karl Rolvaag
30	Elmer L. Andersen (1909–2004)	January 4, 1961 – March 25, 1963 (811 days; lost election) (Note: The 1962 election was very close, and Andersen continued in office until a winner was decided; Rolvaag was declared the victor on March 15, 1963.)	Republican	1960	Karl Rolvaag
31	Karl Rolvaag (1913–1990)	March 25, 1963 – January 2, 1967 (1380 days; lost election)	Democratic- Farmer-Labor	1962	Sandy Keith
32	Harold LeVander (1910–1992)	January 2, 1967 – January 4, 1971 (1464 days; retired)	Republican	1966	James B. Goetz
33	Wendell R. Anderson (1933–2016)	January 4, 1971 – December 29, 1976 (2187 days; resigned) (Note: Anderson resigned so that his successor would appoint him to the United States Senate.)	Democratic- Farmer-Labor	1970	Rudy Perpich
33	Wendell R. Anderson (1933–2016)	January 4, 1971 – December 29, 1976 (2187 days; resigned)	Democratic- Farmer-Labor	1974	Rudy Perpich
34	Rudy Perpich (1928–1995)	December 29, 1976 – January 1, 1979 (734 days; lost election)	Democratic- Farmer-Labor	Succeeded from lieutenant governor	Alec G. Olson
35	Al Quie (1923–2023)	January 1, 1979 – January 3, 1983 (1464 days; retired)	Independent- Republican	1978	Lou Wangberg
36	Rudy Perpich (1928–1995)	January 3, 1983 – January 7, 1991 (2927 days; lost election)	Democratic- Farmer-Labor	1982	Marlene Johnson
36	Rudy Perpich (1928–1995)	January 3, 1983 – January 7, 1991 (2927 days; lost election)	Democratic- Farmer-Labor	1986	Marlene Johnson
37	Arne Carlson (b. 1934)	January 7, 1991 – January 4, 1999 (2920 days; retired)	Independent- Republican	1990	Joanell Dyrstad
37	Arne Carlson (b. 1934)	January 7, 1991 – January 4, 1999 (2920 days; retired)	Independent- Republican	1994	Joanne Benson
38	Jesse Ventura (b. 1951)	January 4, 1999 – January 6, 2003 (1464 days; retired)	Reform/ Independence (Note: Ventura was elected as representing the Reform Party of Minnesota. The party disaffiliated from its national party and resumed using its previous name, the Independence Party of Minnesota, on March 4, 2000. Ventura had himself disaffiliated from the national party on February 11.)	1998	Mae Schunk
39	Tim Pawlenty (b. 1960)	January 6, 2003 – January 3, 2011 (2920 days; retired)	Republican	2002	Carol Molnau
39	Tim Pawlenty (b. 1960)	January 6, 2003 – January 3, 2011 (2920 days; retired)	Republican	2006	Carol Molnau
40	Mark Dayton (b. 1947)	January 3, 2011 – January 7, 2019 (2927 days; retired)	Democratic- Farmer-Labor	2010	Yvonne Prettner Solon
40	Mark Dayton (b. 1947)	January 3, 2011 – January 7, 2019 (2927 days; retired)	Democratic- Farmer-Labor	2014	Tina Smith (resigned January 2, 2018)
40	Mark Dayton (b. 1947)	January 3, 2011 – January 7, 2019 (2927 days; retired)	Democratic- Farmer-Labor	2014	Vacant
40	Mark Dayton (b. 1947)	January 3, 2011 – January 7, 2019 (2927 days; retired)	Democratic- Farmer-Labor	2014	Michelle Fischbach (took office May 25, 2018)
41	Tim Walz (b. 1964)	January 7, 2019 – Incumbent (Note: Walz's second term began on January 2, 2023, and will expire on January 4, 2027; he is not seeking reelection.) (in office 2881 days)	Democratic- Farmer-Labor	2018	Peggy Flanagan
41	Tim Walz (b. 1964)	January 7, 2019 – Incumbent (in office 2881 days)	Democratic- Farmer-Labor	2022	Peggy Flanagan
42	Amy Klobuchar (b. 1960)	Governor-elect takes office January 4, 2027	Democratic- Farmer-Labor	2026	Ben Schierer

== Elections ==
Gubernatorial elections of the State of Minnesota
Election date	Incumbent	Winner	Runner-up	Term start date	Term Definitions		
Election date	Incumbent	Winner	Runner-up	Term start date	Length	Limit	Beginning
October 13 1857	new office (Note: Samuel Medary was the incumbent governor of Minnesota Territory at the time of the election.)	Henry Hastings Sibley; Dem., 50.3%	Alexander Ramsey; Rep., 49.7%	May 24, 1858	1857 constitution		
October 13 1857	new office	Henry Hastings Sibley; Dem., 50.3%	Alexander Ramsey; Rep., 49.7%	May 24, 1858	Two years	None	None (Note: Governors take office within a few days of the beginning of the legislative session, which after 1883 was scheduled for the first Monday in January after the election.)
November 9 1859	Henry Hastings Sibley; Dem., retiring	Alexander Ramsey; Rep., 54.8%	George Loomis Becker; Dem., 45.2%	January 2, 1860	Two years	None	None
October 8 1861	Alexander Ramsey; Rep., running	Alexander Ramsey; Rep., 60.9%	Edward O. Hamlin; Dem., 39.1%	January 9, 1862	Two years	None	None
November 3 1863	Henry Adoniram Swift (Note: Swift succeeded Ramsey upon his resignation on July 10, 1863.); Rep., retiring	Stephen Miller; Rep., 60.6%	Henry T. Welles; Dem., 39.4%	January 13, 1864	Two years	None	None
November 7 1865	Stephen Miller; Rep., retiring	William Rainey Marshall; Rep., 55.6%	Henry M. Rice; Dem., 44.4%	January 8, 1866	Two years	None	None
November 5 1867	William Rainey Marshall; Rep., running	William Rainey Marshall; Rep., 54.2%	Charles Eugene Flandrau; Dem., 45.8%	January 10, 1868	Two years	None	None
November 2 1869	William Rainey Marshall; Rep., retiring	Horace Austin; Rep., 50.4%	George L. Otis; Dem., 46.4%	January 7, 1870	Two years	None	None
November 7 1871	Horace Austin; Rep., running	Horace Austin; Rep., 59.9%	Winthrop Young; Dem., 40.1%	January 4, 1872	Two years	None	None
November 4 1873	Horace Austin; Rep., lost nomination	Cushman K. Davis; Rep., 53.6%	Ara Barton; Dem., 46.4%	January 9, 1874	Two years	None	None
November 2 1875	Cushman K. Davis; Rep., retiring	John S. Pillsbury; Rep., 57.2%	David L. Buell; Dem., 42.8%	January 7, 1876	Two years	None	None
November 6 1877	John S. Pillsbury; Rep., running	John S. Pillsbury; Rep., 59.3%	William L. Banning; Dem., 40.7%	January 11, 1878	Two years	None	None
November 4 1879	John S. Pillsbury; Rep., running	John S. Pillsbury; Rep., 54.0%	Edmund Rice; Dem., 39.3%	January 10, 1880	Two years	None	None
November 8 1881	John S. Pillsbury; Rep., retiring	Lucius Frederick Hubbard; Rep., 63.6%	Richard W. Johnson; Dem., 36.4%	January 9, 1882	Two years	None	None
November 6 1883	Lucius Frederick Hubbard; Rep., running	Lucius Frederick Hubbard; Rep., 55.4%	Adolph Biermann; Dem., 44.6%	January 7, 1884	Two years	None	None
November 2 1886	Lucius Frederick Hubbard; Rep., retiring	Andrew Ryan McGill; Rep., 48.5%	A. A. Ames; Dem., 47.4%	January 5, 1887	Two years	None	None
November 6 1888	Andrew Ryan McGill; Rep., lost nomination	William Rush Merriam; Rep., 51.3%	Eugene M. Wilson; Dem., 42.1%	January 9, 1889	Two years	None	None
November 4 1890	William Rush Merriam; Rep., running	William Rush Merriam; Rep., 36.6%	Thomas Wilson; Dem., 35.7%	January 5, 1891	Two years	None	None
November 8 1892	William Rush Merriam; Rep., retiring	Knute Nelson; Rep., 42.7%	Daniel W. Lawler; Dem., 37.0%	January 4, 1893	Two years	None	None
November 6 1894	Knute Nelson; Rep., running	Knute Nelson; Rep., 49.9%	Sidney M. Owen; Pop., 29.7%	January 9, 1895	Two years	None	None
November 3 1896	David Marston Clough (Note: Clough succeeded Nelson upon his resignation on January 31, 1895.); Rep., running	David Marston Clough; Rep., 49.2%	John Lind; Dem., 48.1%	January 6, 1897	Two years	None	None
November 8 1898	David Marston Clough; Rep., retiring	John Lind; Dem., 52.3%	William Henry Eustis; Rep., 44.3%	January 2, 1899	Two years	None	None
November 6 1900	John Lind; Dem., running	Samuel Rinnah Van Sant; Rep., 48.7%	John Lind; Dem., 48.0%	January 7, 1901	Two years	None	None
November 4 1902	Samuel Rinnah Van Sant; Rep., running	Samuel Rinnah Van Sant; Rep., 57.5%	Leonard A. Rosing; Dem., 36.7%	January 7, 1903	Two years	None	None
November 8 1904	Samuel Rinnah Van Sant; Rep., retiring	John Albert Johnson; Dem., 48.7%	Robert C. Dunn; Rep., 46.1%	January 4, 1905	Two years	None	None
November 6 1906	John Albert Johnson; Dem., running	John Albert Johnson; Dem., 60.9%	Albert L. Cole; Rep., 34.8%	January 9, 1907	Two years	None	None
November 3 1908	John Albert Johnson; Dem., running	John Albert Johnson; Dem., 52.2%	Jacob F. Jacobson; Rep., 43.8%	January 6, 1909	Two years	None	None
November 8 1910	Adolph Olson Eberhart (Note: Eberhart succeeded Johnson upon his death on September 21, 1909.); Rep., running	Adolph Olson Eberhart; Rep., 55.7%	James Gray; Dem., 35.2%	January 4, 1911	Two years	None	None
November 5 1912	Adolph Olson Eberhart; Rep., running	Adolph Olson Eberhart; Rep., 40.7%	Peter M. Ringdal; Dem., 31.3%	January 8, 1913	Two years	None	None
November 3 1914	Adolph Olson Eberhart; Rep., lost nomination	Winfield Scott Hammond; Dem., 46.0%	William E. Lee; Rep., 42.3%	January 6, 1915	Two years	None	None
November 7 1916	Joseph A. A. Burnquist (Note: Burnquist succeeded Eberhart upon his death on December 30, 1915.); Rep., running	Joseph A. A. Burnquist; Rep., 62.9%	Thomas P. Dwyer; Dem., 23.8%	January 3, 1917	Two years	None	None
November 5 1918	Joseph A. A. Burnquist; Rep., running	Joseph A. A. Burnquist; Rep., 45.0%	David Evans; Farmer–Labor, 30.3%	January 8, 1919	Two years	None	None
November 2 1920	Joseph A. A. Burnquist; Rep., retiring	J. A. O. Preus; Rep., 53.1%	Henrik Shipstead; Ind., 35.9%	January 5, 1921	Two years	None	None
November 7 1922	J. A. O. Preus; Rep., running	J. A. O. Preus; Rep., 45.2%	Magnus Johnson; Farmer–Labor, 43.1%	January 3, 1923	Two years	None	None
November 4 1924	J. A. O. Preus; Rep., retiring	Theodore Christianson; Rep., 48.7%	Floyd B. Olson; Farmer–Labor, 43.8%	January 7, 1925	Two years	None	None
November 2 1926	Theodore Christianson; Rep., running	Theodore Christianson; Rep., 56.5%	Magnus Johnson; Farmer–Labor, 38.1%	January 5, 1927	Two years	None	None
November 6 1928	Theodore Christianson; Rep., running	Theodore Christianson; Rep., 55.0%	Ernest Lundeen; Farmer–Labor, 22.7%	January 9, 1929	Two years	None	None
November 4 1930	Theodore Christianson; Rep., retiring	Floyd B. Olson; Farmer–Labor, 59.3%	Ray P. Chase; Rep., 36.3%	January 7, 1931	Two years	None	None
November 8 1932	Floyd B. Olson; Farmer–Labor, running	Floyd B. Olson; Farmer–Labor, 50.6%	Earle Brown; Rep., 32.3%	January 4, 1933	Two years	None	None
November 6 1934	Floyd B. Olson; Farmer–Labor, running	Floyd B. Olson; Farmer–Labor, 44.6%	Martin A. Nelson; Rep., 37.7%	January 9, 1935	Two years	None	None
November 3 1936	Hjalmar Petersen (Note: Petersen succeeded Olson upon his death on August 22, 1936.); Farmer–Labor, retiring	Elmer A. Benson; Farmer–Labor, 60.7%	Martin A. Nelson; Rep., 38.6%	January 4, 1937	Two years	None	None
November 8 1938	Elmer A. Benson; Farmer–Labor, running	Harold Stassen; Rep., 59.9%	Elmer A. Benson; Farmer–Labor, 34.2%	January 3, 1939	Two years	None	None
November 5 1940	Harold Stassen; Rep., running	Harold Stassen; Rep., 52.1%	Hjalmar Petersen; Farmer–Labor, 36.5%	January 8, 1941	Two years	None	None
November 3 1942	Harold Stassen; Rep., running	Harold Stassen; Rep., 51.6%	Hjalmar Petersen; Farmer–Labor, 37.8%	January 5, 1943	Two years	None	None
November 7 1944	Edward J. Thye (Note: Thye succeeded Stassen upon his resignation on April 27, 1943.); Rep., running	Edward J. Thye; Rep., 61.1%	Byron G. Allen; DFL, 38.3%	January 3, 1945	Two years	None	None
November 5 1946	Edward J. Thye; Rep., retiring	Luther Youngdahl; Rep., 59.0%	Harold H. Barker; DFL, 39.7%	January 8, 1947	Two years	None	None
November 2 1948	Luther Youngdahl; Rep., running	Luther Youngdahl; Rep., 53.1%	Charles Halsted; DFL, 45.1%	January 6, 1949	Two years	None	None
November 7 1950	Luther Youngdahl; Rep., running	Luther Youngdahl; Rep., 60.7%	Harry H. Peterson; DFL, 38.3%	January 3, 1951	Two years	None	None
November 4 1952	C. Elmer Anderson (Note: Anderson succeeded Youngdahl upon his resignation on September 27, 1951.); Rep., running	C. Elmer Anderson; Rep., 55.3%	Orville Freeman; DFL, 44.0%	January 7, 1953	Two years	None	None
November 2 1954	C. Elmer Anderson; Rep., running	Orville Freeman; DFL, 52.7%	C. Elmer Anderson; Rep., 46.8%	January 5, 1955	Two years	None	None
November 6 1956	Orville Freeman; DFL, running	Orville Freeman; DFL, 51.4%	Ancher Nelsen; Rep., 48.2%	January 9, 1957	Two years	None	None
November 4 1958	Orville Freeman; DFL, running	Orville Freeman; DFL, 56.8%	George MacKinnon; Rep., 42.3%	January 7, 1959	Two years	None	None
November 8 1960	Orville Freeman; DFL, running	Elmer L. Andersen; Rep., 54.1%	Orville Freeman; DFL, 45.5%	January 4, 1961	Two years	None	None
November 6 1962	Elmer L. Andersen; Rep., running	Karl Rolvaag; DFL, 49.7%	Elmer L. Andersen; Rep., 49.7%	March 25, 1963 (Note: The 1962 election was very close, and it took until March 15 for Rolvaag to be declared the victor, being sworn in on March 25.)	1958 amendment	None	None
November 6 1962	Elmer L. Andersen; Rep., running	Karl Rolvaag; DFL, 49.7%	Elmer L. Andersen; Rep., 49.7%	March 25, 1963	Four years	None	None
November 8 1966	Karl Rolvaag; DFL, running	Harold LeVander; Rep., 52.6%	Karl Rolvaag; DFL, 46.9%	January 2, 1967	Four years	None	None
November 3 1970	Harold LeVander; Rep., retiring	Wendell R. Anderson; DFL, 54.0%	Douglas M. Head; Rep., 45.5%	January 4, 1971	Four years	None	None
November 5 1974	Wendell R. Anderson; DFL, running	Wendell R. Anderson; DFL, 62.8%	John Warren Johnson; Rep., 29.3%	January 8, 1975	Four years	None	None
November 7 1978	Rudy Perpich (Note: Perpich succeeded Anderson upon his resignation on December 29, 1976.); DFL, running	Al Quie; Indep. Rep., 52.3%	Rudy Perpich; DFL, 45.3%	January 1, 1979	Four years	None	None
November 2 1982	Al Quie; Indep. Rep., retiring	Rudy Perpich; DFL, 58.8%	Wheelock Whitney Jr. Indep. Rep., 39.9%	January 3, 1983	Four years	None	None
November 4 1986	Rudy Perpich; DFL, running	Rudy Perpich; DFL, 55.8%	Cal Ludeman; Indep. Rep., 42.9%	January 5, 1987	Four years	None	None
November 6 1990	Rudy Perpich; DFL, running	Arne Carlson; Indep. Rep., 49.6%	Rudy Perpich; DFL, 46.3%	January 7, 1991	Four years	None	None
November 8 1994	Arne Carlson; Indep. Rep., running	Arne Carlson; Indep. Rep., 62.0%	John Marty; DFL, 33.4%	January 3, 1995	Four years	None	None
November 3 1998	Arne Carlson; Rep., retiring	Jesse Ventura; Reform, 37.0%	Norm Coleman; Rep., 34.3%	January 4, 1999	Four years	None	None
November 5 2002	Jesse Ventura; Reform/Indep., retiring	Tim Pawlenty; Rep., 44.4%	Roger Moe; DFL, 36.5%	January 6, 2003	Four years	None	None
November 7 2006	Tim Pawlenty; Rep., running	Tim Pawlenty; Rep., 46.7%	Mike Hatch; DFL, 45.7%	January 2, 2007	Four years	None	None
November 2 2010	Tim Pawlenty; Rep., retiring	Mark Dayton; DFL, 43.6%	Tom Emmer; Rep., 43.2%	January 3, 2011	Four years	None	None
November 4 2014	Mark Dayton; DFL, running	Mark Dayton; DFL, 50.1%	Jeff Johnson; Rep., 44.5%	January 5, 2015	Four years	None	None
November 6 2018	Mark Dayton; DFL, retiring	Tim Walz; DFL, 53.8%	Jeff Johnson; Rep., 42.4%	January 7, 2019	Four years	None	None
November 8 2022	Tim Walz; DFL, running	Tim Walz; DFL, 52.3%	Scott Jensen; Rep., 44.6%	January 2, 2023	Four years	None	None
November 3 2026	Tim Walz; DFL, retiring	Amy Klobuchar; DFL, 55.5%	Lisa Demuth; Rep., 42.6%	around January 4, 2027	Four years	None	None

== See also ==
- Gubernatorial lines of succession in the United States § Minnesota
- List of first ladies and gentlemen of Minnesota
- Lieutenant Governor of Minnesota
- List of Minnesota state legislatures

== Sources ==
- "Former Minnesota Governors". National Governors Association.
- "Governors, 1849-Present". Minnesota Legislative Reference Library.
- "Minnesota Constitution". State Democracy Research Initiative. University of Wisconsin Law School.
- Dubin, Michael J. (2003). United States Gubernatorial Elections, 1776–1860: The Official Results by State and County. McFarland. ISBN 0-7864-1439-1 – via Internet Archive.
- Glashan, Roy R. (1979). American Governors and Gubernatorial Elections, 1775-1978. Meckler Books. ISBN 0-7201-1511-6 – via Internet Archive.
- Kallenbach, Joseph E.; Kallenbach, Jessamine S. (1977). American State Governors, 1776-1976. Oceana Publications. ISBN 978-0-379-00665-0 – via Internet Archive.
- McMullin, Thomas A.; Walker, David (1984). Biographical Directory of American Territorial Governors. Meckler Publishing. ISBN 0-930466-11-X – via Internet Archive.
- Mullaney, Marie Marmo (1994). Biographical Directory of the Governors of the United States, 1988–1994. Greenwood Publishing Group. ISBN 0-313-28312-5 – via Internet Archive.
- Sobel, Robert; Raimo, John (1978). Biographical Directory of the Governors of the United States, 1789-1978. Vol. 2. Meckler Books. ISBN 0-930466-01-2 – via Internet Archive.
- Thorpe, Francis Newton, ed. (1909). The Federal and State Constitutions, Colonial Charters, and Other Organic Laws of the States, Territories, and Colonies Now or Heretofore Forming the United States of America. Vol. 4. United States Government Publishing Office – via Internet Archive.
