= Jay E. Nash =

State Secretary of the Public Ownership (Socialist) Party of Minnesota
- In office 1904–1912
- Preceded by: Spencer M. Holman
- Succeeded by: Thomas E. Latimer

Personal details
- Born: Jay Elijah Nash; March 29, 1843 Hadley, Massachusetts, U.S.
- Died: July 30, 1915 (aged 72) Robbinsdale, Minnesota, U.S.
- Party: Socialist
- Spouse(s): Martha M. Davis (m. 1865; div. 1885 or 1886) Clara L. Cooper (m. 1886)
- Children: 3

Military service
- Allegiance: United States
- Branch/service: United States Army
- Years of service: 1861 – 1865
- Rank: Sergeant
- Unit: Company D, 27th Massachusetts
- Battles/wars: American Civil War

Jay Elijah Nash (March 29, 1843 – July 30, 1915) was an American Civil War veteran, farmer, businessman, and politician who was one of the founders of the Socialist Party of Minnesota, served as its State Secretary from 1904 to 1912, and ran as the Socialist nominee for Governor of Minnesota in 1902 and 1904, and for Minnesota State Treasurer in 1912 and 1914.

== Early life and military service ==
Jay E. Nash was born on March 29, 1843, in Hadley, Massachusetts, to Samuel and Lurintha (Ball) Nash. Samuel was born on March 13, 1810, and was a farmer and surveyor, who also served in the Massachusetts General Court for a time. Lurintha was born on March 12, 1811, and was a member of the New England Ball family. (Note: Jay E. Nash was actually a fourth cousin once removed of Lucille Ball. Lurintha Ball Nash's great grandfather was Thomas Ball, whose older brother, Isaac Ball, was Lucille Ball's great great great grandfather.) Samuel and Lurintha were married on May 1, 1834. Jay was the couple's second son and third child overall, out of four sons and three daughters. However, his youngest sister, Anna M. Nash, died in 1851, just eight days after her first birthday.

Nash enlisted in the Union Army on September 10, 1861, mustering into Company D of the 27th Regiment Massachusetts Volunteer Infantry ten days later. Nash stayed in the Army for the remainder of the American Civil War, re-enlisting when his initial term of enlistment expired in 1863. Through the course of the war, he participated in twenty battles, and was eventually promoted to the rank of Sergeant. Nash was wounded in action at Petersburg on July 16, 1864. On March 8, 1865, Nash was captured in North Carolina, and thereafter briefly held as a prisoner of war until he was exchanged on March 27. Following the end of the war, Nash was mustered out of the Army on June 26, 1865.

== Postwar ==
With the end of the Civil War, Nash returned home to Hadley, resuming residence in his family home, wherein his mother (who had been widowed in 1861) and his younger siblings still resided. There he married Martha M. Davis, a Springfield native three years his junior, on April 8, 1865. In 1869, Jay and Martha Nash moved to Minnesota, taking up residence in Minneapolis. Five years later, Martha gave birth to Jay's first son—and the couple's only child together—George S. Nash.

In 1880, Nash purchased 40 acres of land in what was then Crystal Lake Township, Hennepin County, where the Nashes established a dairy farm with 82 head of cattle. Nash also established a hardware store in the township in 1886, thereby diversifying his income. In response to a land grab made by the City of Minneapolis, whereby Minneapolis annexed a number of nearby townships in order to increase its taxable property, the residents of Crystal Lake Township incorporated the Village of Crystal in 1887, which would, six years later, be reincorporated as the Village of Robbinsdale.

Martha Nash would not, however, long reside on the Nash farm, as the couple divorced at some point in 1885 or 1886. (Note: Although no documents can be found directly evidencing the presumption, there is nevertheless a strong presumption to be made that Jay and Martha Nash most likely divorced at some point in the 1885-1886 biennium. The 1885 Minnesota State census still listed Martha as Jay's then-current spouse, but the 1900 United States census lists Jay and Clara's marriage year as 1886. It is clear that the marriage between Jay and Martha did not end due to her death, as marriage records exist showing that Martha M. Nash remarried in 1894.) In 1886, the 43 year old Nash remarried, taking Clara Louise Cooper, a Vermont native 13 years his junior, as his new wife. Four years later, on October 3, 1890, Clara gave birth to Jay's younger son and the couple's first child together, Floyd E. Nash. In 1895, the couple welcomed the addition of their youngest child, a daughter named Ruby L. Nash.

== Foundation of the Socialist Party; first gubernatorial campaign ==
As Jay E. Nash grew older, reflection upon his experiences from the Civil War convinced him that war was an enterprise of organized murder. As he grew increasingly pacifistic, he furthermore became convinced that socialism was the only way to guarantee peace. In 1899, Nash was one of the founders of the Social Democratic Party of Minnesota, a state affiliate of the Springfield faction of the Social Democratic Party of America. Quickly establishing himself as a respected leader within the state organization, Nash was elected to represent the Social Democratic Party of Minnesota as a delegate to the Socialist Unity Convention of 1901, wherein the Chicago-based and Springfield-based Social Democratic Parties were merged to form the Socialist Party of America. His presence would become ubiquitous in the Minnesota delegations to the national conventions of the Socialist Party, as he was elected to represent Minnesota at every national convention of the party held before his death.

In 1902, Nash was chosen to serve as the nominee of the newly renamed Socialist Party of Minnesota at that year's gubernatorial election. However, Nash's candidacy in that election quickly hit a stumbling block when the Socialist Labor Party objected to Nash's use of the ballot designation "Socialist," and attempted to bar Nash from appearing on the ballot altogether. In October 1902, the case went before the Minnesota Supreme Court, which ruled that, because the Minnesota Party Name Protection Act prohibited any candidate from using any part of the name of a recognized political party if that candidate was not endorsed by that party, and because the Socialist Labor Party had been recognized in Minnesota since 1896, Nash could not use the designation "Socialist" on the ballot. The court, however, ruled that there wasn't sufficient cause to bar Nash from appearing on the ballot. The Court also ruled that he could not revert to the "Social Democratic" designation, because that contained part of the name of the Minnesota Democratic Party, and so Nash was placed on the ballot without a party designation in 1902. Nash won just 0.93 percent of the vote, down from Thomas H. Lucas' 1.13 percent from 1900.

Although the party name prohibition did not apply to any of the Socialist candidates for the other state constitutional offices in that election (who were all listed on the ballot with the "Socialist" designation), the party knew it would be vulnerable to legal actions if it continued to run candidates with that designation in the future. This caused the Socialist Party of Minnesota to adopt the name "Public Ownership Party of Minnesota" (for non-ballot purposes, named the "Public Ownership (Socialist) Party of Minnesota") after the 1902 election, which it continued to use through 1912. Ultimately, the Socialist Labor Party did not have any candidates on the state general election ballot in 1912, which caused it to lose official recognition and thus protection under the Party Name Protection Act; seizing upon the opportunity, the Public Ownership (Socialist) Party reverted to the Socialist Party name following the 1912 elections.

== Second gubernatorial campaign and State Secretary ==
Despite his lackluster finish in the 1902 election, Nash's star in the Public Ownership (Socialist) Party, as it was then known, continued to rise. In 1904, State Secretary Spencer M. Holman decided not to seek another term in that office. On February 22, the state convention of the Public Ownership (Socialist) Party of Minnesota, meeting in Minneapolis, elected Nash to succeed Holman as State Secretary. Nash was also, once again, chosen as the party's nominee for the office of Governor in the 1904 election. To date, Nash remains the only person to be nominated twice by the Socialist Party of Minnesota for the office of Governor, and his tenure as State Secretary would eventually span a longer period of time than any of the other State Secretaries of the Minnesota organization for whom records still exist.

In the 1904 election, Nash won 1.91 percent of the vote, more than doubling his finish from 1902. However, it probably stands to reason that a large part of Nash's improved finish in 1904 was from riding Eugene V. Debs' coattails—the perennial Socialist presidential nominee, won nearly four percent of the vote in Minnesota during the 1904 presidential election. The party's candidates in elections held in Minnesota in 1904 generally outperformed the slate from 1902 by a large margin.

During Nash's tenure as State Secretary, however, the party in Minnesota sustained impressive growth. In 1905—just one year after Nash assumed the position of State Secretary—the Public Ownership (Socialist) Party of Minnesota averaged 791 members in good standing; by 1908, that number had more than doubled, to 1,837. In July 1914—just two years after Nash left office as State Secretary—the Socialist Party of Minnesota peaked at 5,600 members in good standing.

And the strides made also translated into increases in electoral strength. In 1904, Debs won 3.99 percent for president in Minnesota; in 1912, Debs won 8.23 percent of the state's vote and carried Lake and Beltrami counties. In 1904, neither of the party's two candidates for the United States House of Representatives from Minnesota won more than 7.44 percent of the vote; in 1912, five of the party's seven congressional candidates won more than ten percent of the vote, with Michael A. Brattland winning 33.28 percent of the vote in the 9th district, Morris Kaplan winning 18.31 percent in the 8th district, Thomas E. Latimer winning 17.17 percent in the 5th district, Albert Rosenquist winning 14.32 percent in the 4th district, and James S. Ingalls winning 10.73 percent running in the at-large district. In 1912, David Morgan's share of the vote for Governor was more than four times greater than Nash's share had been in 1904.

The party in Minnesota also began to experience outright victories during the middle and latter half of Nash's tenure as State Secretary: In 1908, Adolf Evensen Ousdahl was elected Mayor of Brainerd. In 1910, J. C. Dahl was elected Mayor of Sr. Hilaire, James Sturdevant was elected Mayor of Tenstrike, and Nels S. Hillman of Two Harbors became the first member of the Socialist Party to be elected to the Minnesota Legislature. In 1912, Hillman was re-elected to the Legislature, Ousdahl was elected to a non-consecutive second term as Mayor of Brainerd, and H. L. Larson and Fred Mahlzan were elected Mayor of Crookston and Bemidji, respectively.

== Later years and death ==
After serving for eight years as the State Secretary of the party, Nash left office in 1912, being succeeded by future-Minneapolis Mayor Thomas E. Latimer. Nash ran as a candidate in that year's election for the office of State Treasurer, winning 36,424 votes, or 12.65 percent. He also took to the speakers' circuit, giving speeches to the various Locals in the state. Nash again ran for the office of State Treasurer in 1914, winning 28,486 votes (8.96 percent).

Less than a year after his final electoral appearance, Nash was mortally injured when, on July 30, 1915, he was thrown from his wagon. 72 years old at the time of his death, he was survived by his wife, Clara, his sons, George and Floyd, and his daughter, Ruby. Clara continued to reside at Nash's Robbinsdale home until she too died in 1944. Afterward, their daughter Ruby continued to live in the home until her own death in the 1960s.

== Electoral history ==
1914

Minnesota State Treasurer election, 1914
Party	Candidate	Votes	%
Republican	Walter J. Smith (Incumbent)	173,198	54.46
Democratic	E. M. Engelbert	90,810	28.55
Socialist	Jay E. Nash	28,486	8.96
Progressive	P. C. Jacobson	25,534	8.03
Majority		82,388	25.91
Total votes		318,028	100
Republican hold			

1912

Minnesota State Treasurer election, 1912
Party	Candidate	Votes	%
Republican	Walter J. Smith (Incumbent)	172,807	60.02
Democratic	Henry F. Wessel	78,703	27.33
Public Ownership	Jay E. Nash	36,424	12.65
Majority		94,104	32.69
Total votes		287,934	100
Republican hold			

1904

Minnesota gubernatorial election, 1904
Party	Candidate	Votes	%
Democratic	John Albert Johnson	147,992	48.71
Republican	Robert C. Dunn	140,130	46.13
Prohibition	Charles W. Dorsett	7,577	2.49
Public Ownership	Jay E. Nash	5,810	1.91
Socialist Labor	A. W. M. Anderson	2,293	0.76
Majority		7,862	2.58
Total votes		303,802	100
Democratic gain from Republican			

1902

Minnesota gubernatorial election, 1902
Party	Candidate	Votes	%
Republican	Samuel R. Van Sant (Incumbent)	155,849	57.53
Democratic	Leonard A. Rosing	99,362	36.68
Prohibition	Charles Scanlon	5,765	2.13
Populist	Thomas J. Meighen	4,821	1.78
Socialist Labor	Thomas Van Lear	2,570	0.95
Independent	Jay E. Nash	2,521	0.93
Majority		56,487	20.85
Total votes		270,888	100
Republican hold			

== See also ==
- Socialist Party of Minnesota

== Notes ==
Party political offices
Preceded by S. M. Holman	State Secretary of the Socialist Party of Minnesota; 1904 – 1912	Succeeded by Thomas E. Latimer
Preceded by Thomas H. Lucas (as a Social Democrat)	Socialist Party of Minnesota Gubernatorial candidate 1902, 1904	Succeeded by O. E. Lofthus
Preceded by John Kolu	Socialist Party of Minnesota candidate for State Treasurer; 1912, 1914	Succeeded by P. H. Phelps (1920)
