= Duluth Union Labor Party =

Defunct political party formerly active in Minnesota

- Founded: March 10, 1887
- Merged into: Minnesota Farmer-Labor Party (1920)
- Headquarters: Duluth, Minnesota
- Ideology: Anti-Monopolism; Georgism; Pro-Prohibition (from 1918)
- Political position: Left-wing

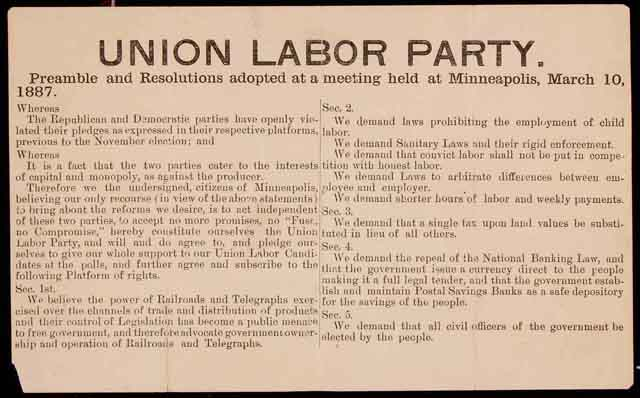
Union Labor Party preamble and resolutions, 1887

The Duluth Union Labor Party (DULP) was a political party active in Duluth, Minnesota in the United States. In 1920, it merged into the Minnesota Farmer-Labor Party. It was originally affiliated with the national Union Labor Party, however continued to exist independently following the Union Labor Party's dissolution in 1891.

== History ==
The party was not initially specific to Duluth. It was founded in Minneapolis, Minnesota, but was only ever active in a few cities, finding general support only in Duluth. The founding convention was held on March 10, 1887, in Minneapolis. The policies agreed upon in the convention was a ban on child labor, sanitation laws, a distinction between prison labor and employed labor, a legal framework for labor unions, georgist tax policy, the repeal of the National Bank Act, and that all civilian offices would be elected. A convention held the following week had many speeches, including from Alexander Stewart and Thomas H. Lucas. The speeches were generally conservative in tone, making little use of aggressive language against the establishment. However, the crowd sometimes roared in opposition against more moderate positions. The party focused on local offices, rather than immediately moving to state-wide offices.

In 1888, a full slate of DULP candidates were nominated for statewide offices. None received more than 644 votes. Following these defeats, the party would run candidates only locally.

The DULP supported the candidacy of Socialist Party member Thomas Van Lear for Mayor of Minneapolis in 1916. However, following his electoral victory, he would lose the favor of the DULP due to Van Lear's opposition to American entry into World War I.

In July of 1918, the party adopted a platform of alcohol prohibition. State Senator Richard Jones gave the principal address at the convention where the platform was adopted. The prohibition position of the party was not an issue with alcohol itself, but a protest against the saloonkeepers and breweries hostile to their workers.

One prominent member of the party was William Leighton Carss. In 1918, Carss was elected to the United States House of Representatives on a DULP ticket, but was inaugurated as a member of the Minnesota Farmer-Labor Party. In 1919, Union Laborite Frank E. Little was elected mayor of Brainerd.

In February 1920, the DULP formally joined the Farmer-Labor Party.

The extant successor organization to the DULP is the Duluth DFL. The Farmer-Labor Party united with the Minnesota Democratic Party in 1944 to for the DFL.
