= Socialist Party of Minnesota =

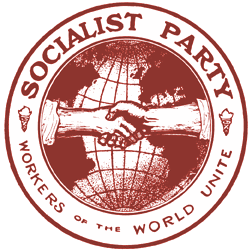
- Founded: 1899
- Dissolved: Sometime after 1980, but prior to 1988. Currently active as the “Twin Cities Metro Area Socialist Party”
- Succeeded by: Twin Cities Metro Area Socialist Party
- Headquarters: Minneapolis
- Newspaper: New Times
- Membership (1914): 5,600
- Ideology: Socialism (American)
- Political position: Left-wing
- National affiliation: Social Democratic Party of America (Springfield faction) (1899–1901); Socialist Party of America (1901–1972); Socialist Party USA (1973–?)
- Colors: Dark red

The Socialist Party of Minnesota (from 1899 to 1902 the Social Democratic Party of Minnesota; from 1903 to 1913 the Public Ownership Party of Minnesota) was the state affiliate of the Springfield faction of the Social Democratic Party of America, the Socialist Party of America, and finally the Socialist Party USA in the U.S. state of Minnesota.

== History ==
The state organization was established in 1899, when the Kangaroo faction bolted from the Socialist Labor Party of America in support of the American Federation of Labor and opposition to the internal regime of the SLP under Daniel DeLeon. Its initial electoral appearances were unimpressive, but it began to grow rapidly after 1905, and eventually became, together with the organizations in Wisconsin, Oklahoma, Oregon, North Dakota, Washington, New York, etc., one of the Socialist Party's stronger state organizations—even to the point where, in 1912, half of all of the counties carried by Eugene V. Debs were in Minnesota. But, in spite—or perhaps because—of its rapid growth, the Socialist Party of Minnesota soon also became a heavily contested battlefield for factional disputes within the SPA. This culminated in the period of 1914 though 1919, in which the Socialist Party of Minnesota was decimated by conflicts rooted first in differences of opinion regarding the United States' entry into World War I, and later disagreements over the Bolshevism question following the Russian Revolution. In addition to tearing itself apart, the party was also affected by shifts in public opinion during the First Red Scare, which made it increasingly difficult for the Socialist Party to access an audience.

The Socialist Party of Minnesota continued to exist after 1920, but in a severely weakened state. Many of its former members, such as William Mahoney, Thomas E. Latimer, and Thomas Van Lear, became active in the Farmer-Labor Party of Minnesota, which the former Van Lear faction of the Socialist Party helped to solidify after Van Lear was expelled from the Socialist Party. The Socialist Party of Minnesota itself participated in the Farmer-Labor Party's electoral coalition in state politics from the early 1920s into the mid 1930s. Meanwhile, the state organization continued to achieve ballot access for Norman Thomas in 1928, 1932, 1936, 1940, 1944, and 1948, although it was not able to secure ballot access for Darlington Hoopes in 1952 and 1956.

The Minnesota organization continued to send delegates to the national conventions of the Socialist Party through the 1960s, until the Social Democrats, USA were formed in 1972. Afterward, the Socialist Party of Minnesota reorganized as a part of the Socialist Party USA, sending delegates to the SPUSA's reorganizing convention in 1973. As a unit of the SPUSA, the Socialist Party of Minnesota was able to secure presidential ballot access in Minnesota for Frank Zeidler in 1976 and again for David McReynolds in 1980; however, the organization essentially disappeared at some point prior to 1988.

== Nominees for public office ==
=== Presidential tickets (Note: Includes only presidential tickets for which the Socialist Party of America or the Socialist Party USA had presidential ballot access in Minnesota. The Socialist Party of Minnesota failed to achieve ballot access for Darlington Hoopes and Samuel H. Friedman in 1952 and 1956. The Socialist Party did not nominate any tickets in 1960, 1964, 1968, or 1972. The Socialist Party USA has not achieved ballot access in Minnesota since 1980.) ===
Year	Results		Candidates		Ref.	Notes
Year	Votes	%	for President	for Vice President	Ref.	Notes
1900	3,065	0.97	Eugene V. Debs (IN)	Job Harriman (CA)		(Note: All candidates listed running in 1900 were running as candidates of the Social Democratic Party.)
1904	11,692	3.99	Eugene V. Debs (IN)	Benjamin Hanford (NY)		(Note: In the general elections of 1904, 1906, 1908, 1910, and 1912, the Socialist Party of Minnesota was, due to state law reserving the use of the word "Socialist" in ballot designations to the Socialist Labor Party, forced to use the ballot designation of "Public Ownership Party".)
1908	14,527	4.38	Eugene V. Debs (IN)	Benjamin Hanford (NY)		
1912	27,505	8.23	Eugene V. Debs (IN)	Emil Seidel (WI)		
1916	20,117	5.19	Allan L. Benson (NY)	George Ross Kirkpatrick (NJ)		
1920	56,106	7.62	Eugene V. Debs (IN)	Seymour Stedman (IL)		
1924	339,192	41.26	Robert M. La Follette (WI)	Burton K. Wheeler (MT)		(Note: In the presidential election of 1924, the Socialist Party opted not to nominate a ticket, instead endorsing the Progressive ticket of Robert M. La Follette of Wisconsin and Burton K. Wheeler of Montana.)
1928	6,774	0.70	Norman Thomas (NY)	James H. Maurer (PA)		
1932	25,476	2.54	Norman Thomas (NY)	James H. Maurer (PA)		
1936	2,872	0.25	Norman Thomas (NY)	George A. Nelson (WI)		
1940	5,454	0.44	Norman Thomas (NY)	Maynard C. Krueger (IL)		
1944	5,073	0.45	Norman Thomas (NY)	Darlington Hoopes (PA)		
1948	4,646	0.38	Norman Thomas (NY)	Tucker P. Smith (MI)		
1976	354	0.02	Frank Zeidler (WI)	J. Quinn Brisben (IL)		(Note: Zeidler/Brisben and McReynolds/Drufenbrock were tickets of the Socialist Party USA.)
1980	536	0.03	David McReynolds (NY)	Diane Drufenbrock (IN)		(Note: McReynolds was the first openly-gay man to be nominated for the office of President of the United States by any political party.)

=== Congressional nominees ===
==== Senate ====
Year	Results		Candidate	Ref.	Notes
Year	Votes	%	Candidate	Ref.	Notes
1934	5,616	0.56	Morris Kaplan		

==== 2nd district ====
Year	Results		Candidate	Ref.	Notes
Year	Votes	%	Candidate	Ref.	Notes
1910	556	2.01	D. A. Thayer		
1912	1,479	5.05	John R. Hollister		
1914	1,326	3.88	John R. Hollister		

==== 4th district ====
Year	Results		Candidate	Ref.	Notes
Year	Votes	%	Candidate	Ref.	Notes
1906	1,544	5.14	Adolph Lando		
1908	1,784	4.96	Ernest W. Woodrich		
1910	1,953	5.87	Charles H. Stratton		
1912	6,021	14.32	Albert Rosenquist		
1914	2,221	7.21	William Mahoney		
1916	1,854	4.83	Hermon W. Phillips		
1919	424	1.55	C. R. Carlgren		(Note: Special election.)

==== 5th district ====
Year	Results		Candidate	Ref.	Notes
Year	Votes	%	Candidate	Ref.	Notes
1900	725	1.74	Adolph Hirshfield		
1902	215	0.56	Spencer M. Holman		
1904	3,184	7.44	Adolph Hirshfield		
1906	1,386	3.24	Charles Fremont Dight		
1908	1,816	4.56	Charles Fremont Dight		
1910	2,323	6.66	Frederick F. Lindsay		
1912	6,929	17.17	Thomas E. Latimer		
1914	10,312	33.34	Thomas Van Lear		
1916	7,526	16.69	Thomas E. Latimer		
1934	317	0.27	George Riedel		

==== 6th district ====
Year	Results		Candidate	Ref.	Notes
Year	Votes	%	Candidate	Ref.	Notes
1912	2,839	8.34	A. W. Uhl		
1914	3,769	11.64	Otto M. Thomason		

==== 8th district ====
Year	Results		Candidate	Ref.	Notes
Year	Votes	%	Candidate	Ref.	Notes
1902	538	2.24	Vincent C. Koneczny		
1904	314	1.08	J. Adam O'Malley		
1906	6,025	24.43	George F. Peterson		
1908	6,298	18.43	Alexander Halliday		
1910	4,354	13.74	O. S. Watkins		
1912	7,398	18.31	Morris Kaplan		
1914	4,179	14.89	William E. Towne		
1916	9,034	26.25	Juls J. Anderson		

==== 9th district ====
Year	Results		Candidate	Ref.	Notes
Year	Votes	%	Candidate	Ref.	Notes
1906	5,490	19.87	Haldor Erickson Boen		
1908	2,985	8.30	T. T. Braaten		
1910	8,421	25.52	David Sanders		
1912	11,190	33.28	Michael A. Brattland		
1914	7,489	23.65	Michael A. Brattland		
1916	4,347	11.41	T. A. Thompson		

==== 10th district ====
Year	Results		Candidate	Ref.	Notes
Year	Votes	%	Candidate	Ref.	Notes
1916	3,782	8.64	John G. Soltis		

==== At-large district ====
Year	Results		Candidate	Ref.	Notes
Year	Votes	%	Candidate	Ref.	Notes
1912	30,042	10.73	James S. Ingalls		

=== Nominees for state executive offices ===
==== Governor ====
Year	Results		Candidate	Ref.	Notes
Year	Votes	%	Candidate	Ref.	Notes
1900	3,546	1.13	Thomas H. Lucas		
1902	2,521	0.93	Jay E. Nash		
1904	5,810	1.91	Jay E. Nash		
1906	4,646	1.68	O. E. Lofthus		
1908	6,516	1.94	Beecher Moore		
1910	11,173	3.79	George E. Barrett		
1912	25,769	8.09	David Morgan		
1914	17,225	5.02	Thomas J. Lewis		
1916	26,306	6.73	Jacob O. Bentall		
1918	7,794	2.11	L. P. Berot		
1920	5,124	0.65	Peter J. Sampson		

==== Lieutenant Governor (Note: From statehood through 1970, the Governor and Lieutenant Governor of Minnesota were elected separately.) ====
Year	Results		Candidate	Ref.	Notes
Year	Votes	%	Candidate	Ref.	Notes
1902	5,143	1.95	Michael A. Brattland		
1904	8,657	3.02	O. E. Lofthus		
1910	18,363	6.64	Lewis M. Ayer		
1912	31,479	10.73	D. M. Robertson		
1914	28,649	8.86	Andrew Hanson		
1916	33,628	8.93	Andrew Hanson		
1920	10,629	1.41	Lillian Friedman		(Note: Lillian Friedman was the first woman ever nominated by any political party for the office of Lieutenant Governor of Minnesota.)

==== Secretary of State ====
Year	Results		Candidate	Ref.	Notes
Year	Votes	%	Candidate	Ref.	Notes
1902	5,303	2.01	Bertram F. Morledge		
1904	10,235	3.57	J. Ed Carlson		
1908	10,939	3.64	John LaFevre		
1910	17,369	6.25	Torkel Hoiland		
1912	32,602	10.90	John Alvin Johnson		
1920	18,965	2.58	J. H. Hirt		
1936	3,722	0.34	Vincent R. Dunne		

==== State Auditor ====
Year	Results		Candidate	Ref.	Notes
Year	Votes	%	Candidate	Ref.	Notes
1902	10,129	3.91	J. Ed Carlson		
1914	30,291	9.55	T. A. Thompson		

==== State Treasurer ====
Year	Results		Candidate	Ref.	Notes
Year	Votes	%	Candidate	Ref.	Notes
1906	11,291	4.42	John Kolu		
1908	12,404	4.16	John Kolu		
1912	36,424	12.65	Jay E. Nash		
1914	28,486	8.96	Jay E. Nash		
1920	22,454	3.07	P. H. Phelps		

==== Attorney General ====
Year	Results		Candidate	Ref.	Notes
Year	Votes	%	Candidate	Ref.	Notes
1908	12,661	4.27	A. W. Uhl		

==== Railroad and Warehouse Commissioner ====
Year	Results		Candidate	Ref.	Notes
Year	Votes	%	Candidate	Ref.	Notes
1920	23,900	3.32	Tom May		

== Officeholders ==
=== State senators ===
- Andrew Olaf Devold of Minneapolis, District 32 (1919–39) (Note: Ran as a Farmer-Laborite from 1924 onward.)
- Michael Boylan of Virginia, District 61 (1919–27)
- George H. Gardner of Brainerd, District 53 (1915–19)
- Richard Jones of Duluth, District 58 (1915–19) (Note: Richard Jones was elected to the Senate as a member of the Socialist Party, running with the endorsement of the Socialist Party. However, he was expelled from the party by referendum vote of the Socialist Party of St. Louis County before he took office, for "pandering to non-Socialist votes.")

=== State representatives ===
- John H. Boyd of Crookston, District 66 (1915–17; 1919–21)
- Andrew Olaf Devold of Minneapolis, District 32 (1915–19)
- Nels S. Hillman of Two Harbors, District 51 (1911–15)
- Ernest G. Strand of Two Harbors, District 57 (1917–23)
- James W. Woodfill of Two Harbors, District 57 (1915–17)

=== Mayors ===
- Michael Boylan, Mayor of Virginia (1914–18)
- J. C. Dahl, Mayor of St. Hilaire (1911–13)
- William Jackson, Mayor of Dawson (1919–24)
- H. L. Larson, Mayor of Crookston (1912–14)
- Fred Mahlzan, Mayor of Bemidji (1912–14)
- Adolf Evensen Ousdahl, Mayor of Brainerd (1909–11; 1913–15)
- Ernest G. Strand, Mayor of Two Harbors (1916–17)
- James Sturdevant, Mayor of Tenstrike (1911–13)
- Thomas Van Lear, Mayor of Minneapolis (1917–19)

=== Aldermen/City Councilors ===
==== Brainerd ====
- A. G. Anderson (1911–13)
- N. W. Olsen (1911–13)
- R. A. Rennings (1911–13)

==== Cloquet ====
- Frank Yetka (1911–19)

==== Duluth ====
- P. J. Phillips (1912–14)

==== Minneapolis ====
- Albert Bastis (1915–47)
- Lewis Beneke (1921–25)
- Charles Fremont Dight (1915–19)
- A. R. Gisslen (1919–39)
- Theodore Jenson (1917–25)
- Charles Johnson (1913–17)
- Peter J. Pryts (1919–27)
- Charles Rudsdil (1919–27)
- Irving G. Scott (1919–27; 1931–37)
- Alfred Voelker (1913–25)

==== Two Harbors ====
- Ernest G. Strand (1911–16; City Council President 1914–16)

==== Virginia ====
- Michael Boylan (1908–14)

=== Other officeholders ===
- Isaac Biteman, Swanville City Assessor (1912–14)
- Charles M. Floathe, Lake County Register of Deeds (1905–07)
- John Pearson, Lake County Coroner (1905–07)
- W. A. Swanstrom, St. Louis County Commissioner (1917–19)
- Theodore Welte, Clearwater County Commissioner (1912–14)

== Other prominent members ==
- Clarence Hathaway, labor activist; prominent in the Left wing section, Hathaway was certified by State Secretary Dirba as a delegate to the 1919 Emergency National Convention, but became a founding member of the Communist Labor Party of America when the Regulars refused to seat him; later served as an advisory delegate of the Workers Party of America to the Comintern, and eventually a long-time member of the Central Committee of the Communist Party USA
- Algernon Lee, politician, journalist and educator; prominent member of the Kangaroo faction of the SLP, editor of The Tocsin, and one of the founders of the Social Democratic Party of Minnesota; moved to New York City shortly thereafter, running for numerous public offices there
- Anna A. Maley, political activist, journalist and educator; inaugural Secretary of Local Minneapolis; later went on to run for the office of Governor of Washington (becoming the first woman ever to run in a gubernatorial election in Washington), hold office as Chairwoman of the Woman's National Committee, become just the third woman ever to hold a seat on the National Executive Committee of the Socialist Party of America, and serve as an assistant to Minneapolis Mayor Thomas Van Lear
- Yrjö Sirola, Finnish expatriate; served as Finnish Socialist Federation's Work People's College in Smithville from 1910 to 1913; antagonized factional disputes in the Finnish Socialist Federation, which tended to spill over into the Party itself; later returned to Finland where he was a founding member of the Communist Party of Finland
- Carl Skoglund, who was prominent in the Left Section, a founding member of the Communist Party, embraced the views of Leon Trotsky, returned to the SPA after the Trotskyists were driven out of the Communist Party, and eventually became a founding member of the Socialist Workers Party

== State Secretaries (incomplete) ==
- ?–1904: Spencer M. Holman
- 1904–1912: Jay E. Nash
- 1912–1914: Thomas E. Latimer
- 1914–1915: Fred Miller
- 1915–1919: Abraham L. Sugarman
- 1919: Charles Dirba
- 1919–?: Samuel L. Friedman
- ?–?: Lillian Friedman

== See also ==
- Social Democratic Party of America
- Social-Democratic Party of Wisconsin
- Socialist Party of America
- Socialist Party USA
- Minnesota Farmer-Labor Party
- National Party (United States)
- Communist Party USA
  - Communist Party of America
  - Communist Labor Party of America
  - Workers Party of America
