= 1912 Minnesota lieutenant gubernatorial election =

Minnesota lieutenant gubernatorial election, 1912
- November 5, 1912
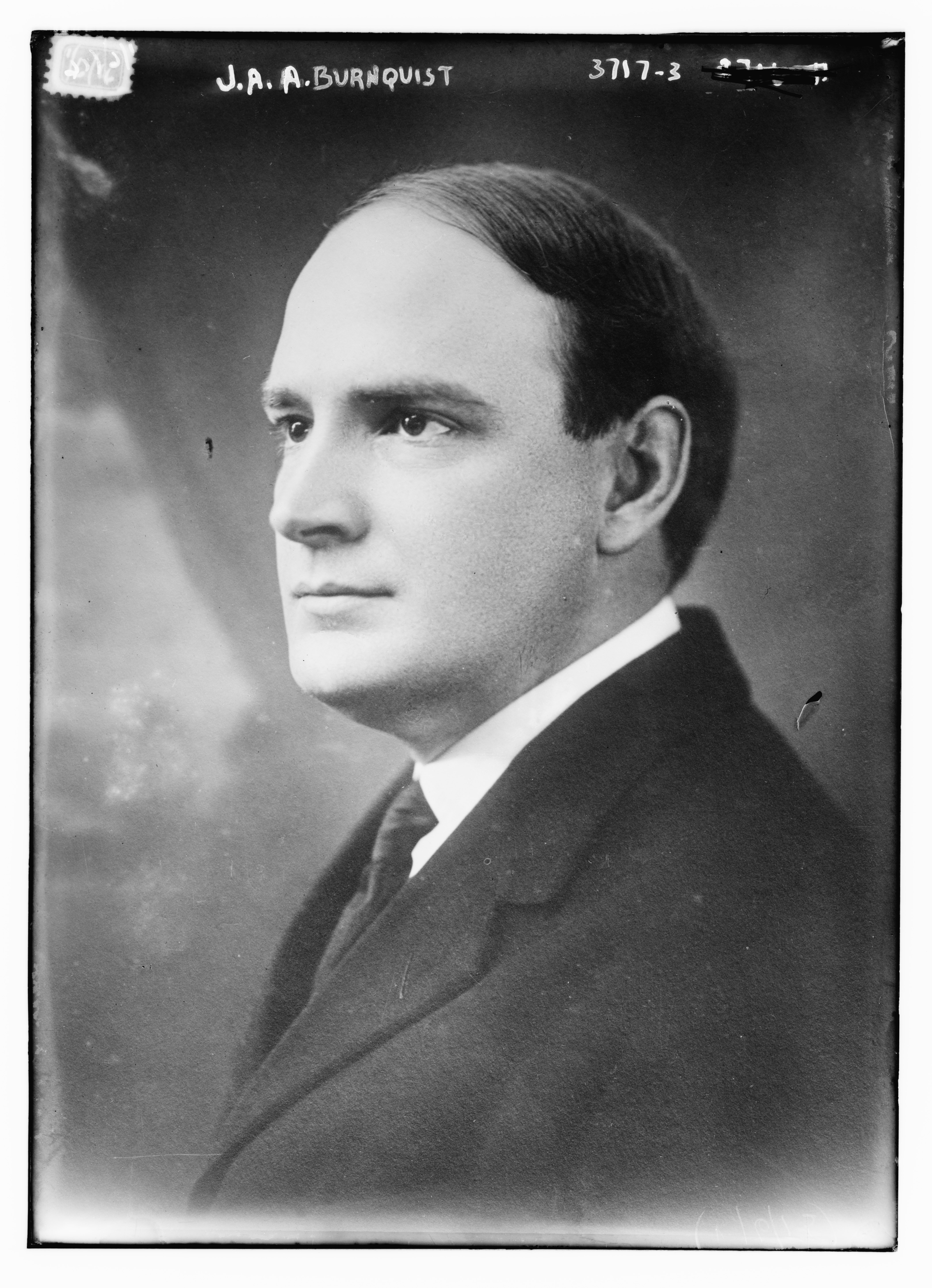

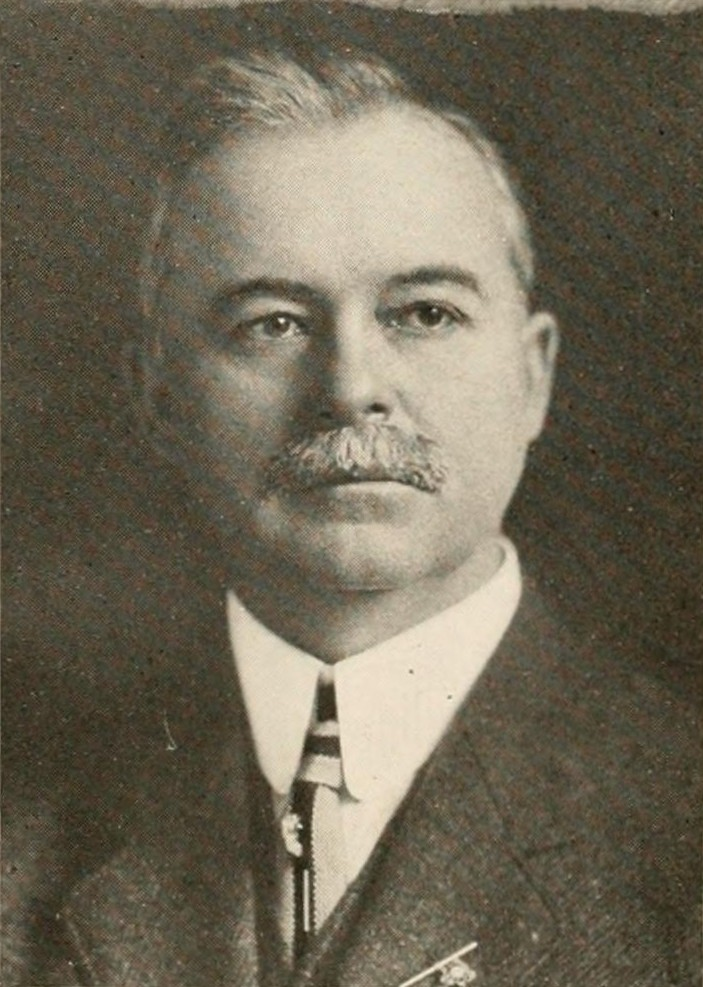

Nominee	J. A. A. Burnquist	Winn Powers
Party	Republican	Democratic
Popular vote	147,776	88,534
Percentage	50.36%	30.17%
Nominee	D. M. Robertson	George H. Andrews
Party	Public Ownership	Prohibition
Popular vote	31,479	25,635
Percentage	10.73%	8.74%
- County results Burnquist: 30–40% 40–50% 50–60% 60–70% 70–80% Powers: 40–50% 50–60% Robertson: 40–50% Tie: 40–50%
Lieutenant Governor before election
Samuel Y. Gordon
Republican
Elected Lieutenant Governor
J. A. A. Burnquist
Republican

The 1912 Minnesota lieutenant gubernatorial election took place on November 5, 1912. Republican Party of Minnesota candidate J. A. A. Burnquist defeated Minnesota Democratic Party challenger Winn Powers, Public Ownership Party candidate D. M. Robertson, and Prohibition Party candidate George H. Andrews.

== Results ==
1912 lieutenant gubernatorial election, Minnesota
Party	Candidate	Votes	%	±%
Republican	J. A. A. Burnquist	147,776	50.36%	−6.03%
Democratic	Winn Powers	88,534	30.17%	−1.10%
Public Ownership	D. M. Robertson	31,479	10.73%	+4.09%
Prohibition	George H. Andrews	25,635	8.74%	+3.03%
Majority		59,242	20.19%	
Turnout		293,424		
Republican hold		Swing		
