= 1914 Minnesota lieutenant gubernatorial election =

- November 3, 1914
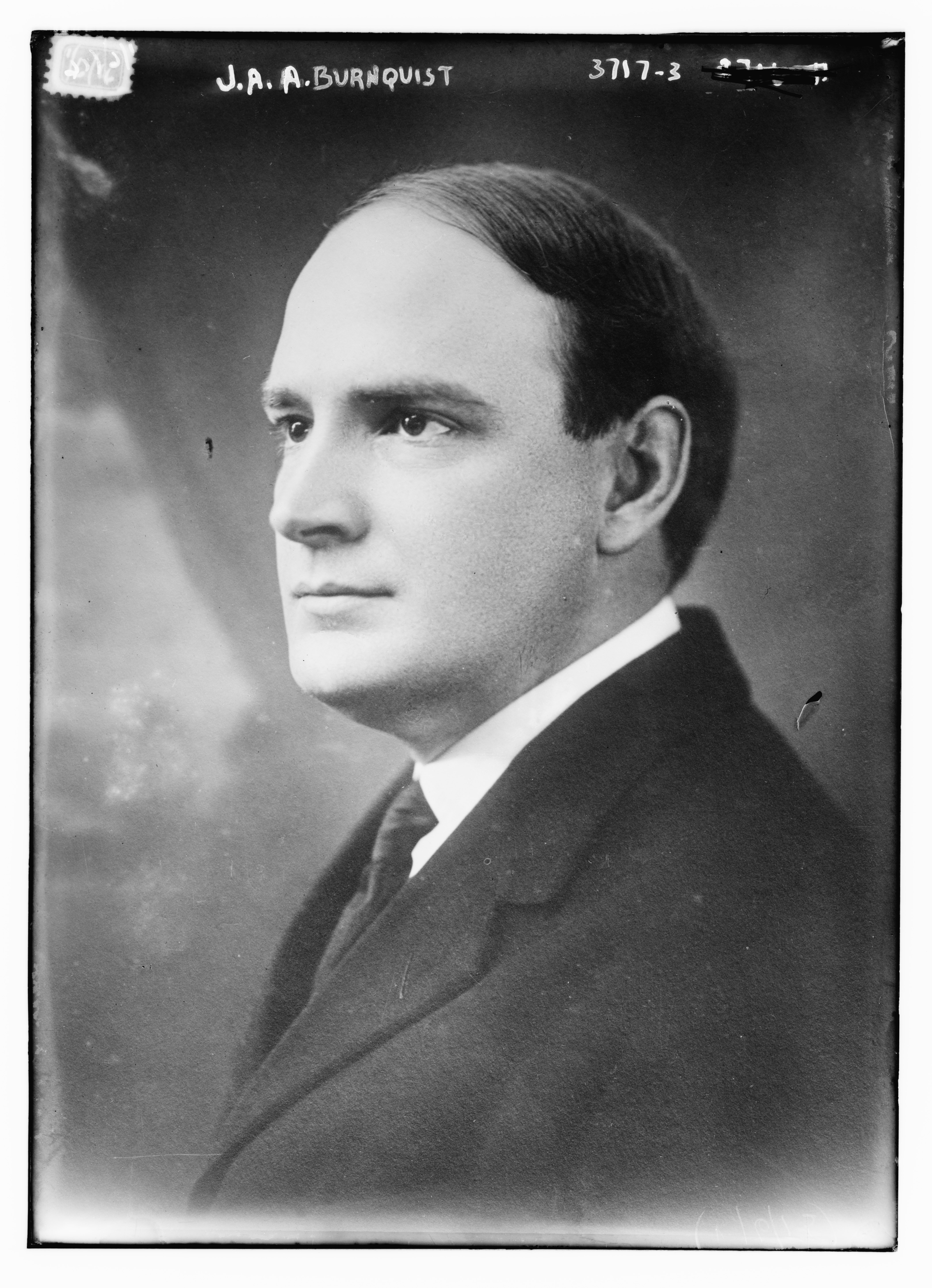

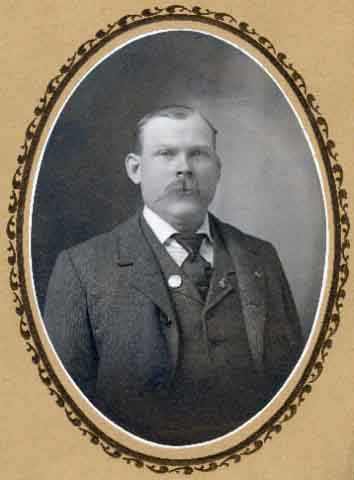

Nominee	J. A. A. Burnquist	Charles M. Andrist
Party	Republican	Democratic
Popular vote	156,069	108,802
Percentage	48.28%	33.66%
Nominee	Andrew Hanson	A. W. Piper
Party	Socialist	Prohibition
Popular vote	28,649	18,938
Percentage	8.86%	5.86%
Lieutenant Governor before election
J. A. A. Burnquist
Republican
Elected Lieutenant Governor
J. A. A. Burnquist
Republican

The 1914 Minnesota lieutenant gubernatorial election took place on November 3, 1914. Incumbent Lieutenant Governor J. A. A. Burnquist of the Republican Party of Minnesota defeated Minnesota Democratic Party challenger Charles M. Andrist, Socialist Party of Minnesota candidate Andrew Hanson, and Prohibition Party candidate A. W. Piper.

== Results ==
1914 lieutenant gubernatorial election, Minnesota
Party	Candidate	Votes	%	±%
Republican	J. A. A. Burnquist (incumbent)	156,069	48.28%	−2.08%
Democratic	Charles M. Andrist	108,802	33.66%	+3.49%
Socialist	Andrew Hanson	28,649	8.86%	−1.87%
Prohibition	A. W. Piper	18,938	5.86%	−2.88%
Progressive	James F. Spencer	10,821	3.35%	n/a
Majority		47,267	14.62%	
Turnout		323,279		
Republican hold		Swing		
