= Thomas H. Lucas =

Member of the Minnesota House of Representatives from the 30th district
- In office January 3, 1887 – January 6, 1889
- Preceded by: Samuel Prather Snider
- Succeeded by: Edward J. Davenport

Personal details
- Born: January 12, 1841 London, England
- Died: April 30, 1925 (aged 84) Minneapolis, Minnesota
- Party: Democratic (to 1890) (affiliated with the Duluth Union Labor Party); Farmer's Alliance (1890); Populist (1892); Social Democratic (1900); Socialist (from 1900)

Thomas H. Lucas (January 12, 1841 – April 30, 1925) was a U.S. politician from the state of Minnesota.

== Life ==
Lucas was born in England, immigrating to Hennepin County, Minnesota, where he would work as a carpenter.

Lucas was elected to the Minnesota House of Representatives as a Democrat in 1886. He did not run for a second term in 1888. In 1890, he unsuccessfully ran for the State House as a member of the Farmer's Alliance. In 1892, he ran for Minnesota's 5th congressional district as a Populist. His final political campaign was in 1900, running for Governor of Minnesota as a Social Democrat.

While serving in the House, Lucas spoke at a convention of the Duluth Union Labor Party in March 1887.

Lucas died in Minneapolis in 1925 at the age of 84.

Party political offices
First	Social Democratic Gubernatorial candidate 1900	Succeeded by Jay E. Nash (as a Socialist)
