= 1904 Minnesota gubernatorial election =

- November 8, 1904
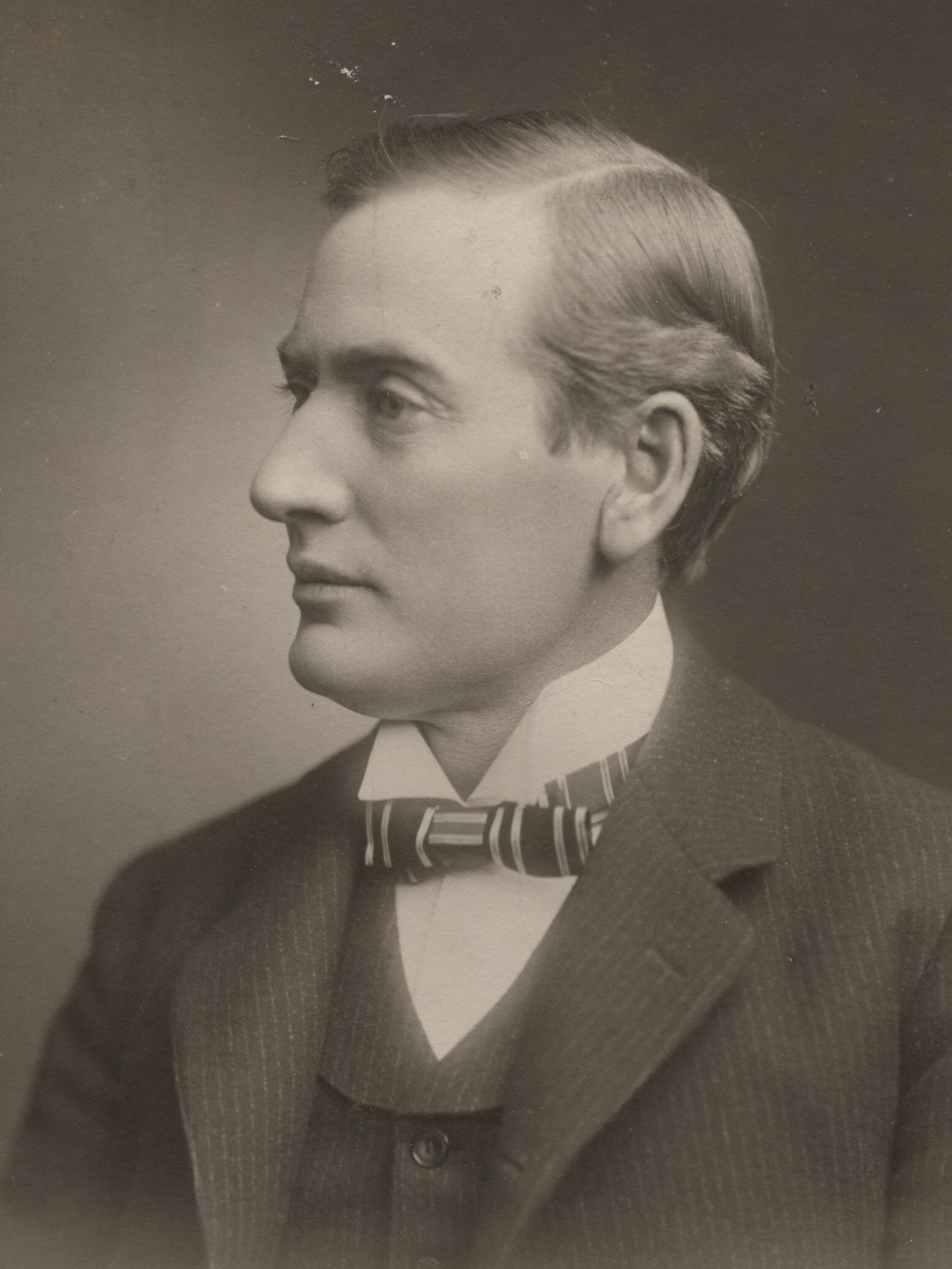

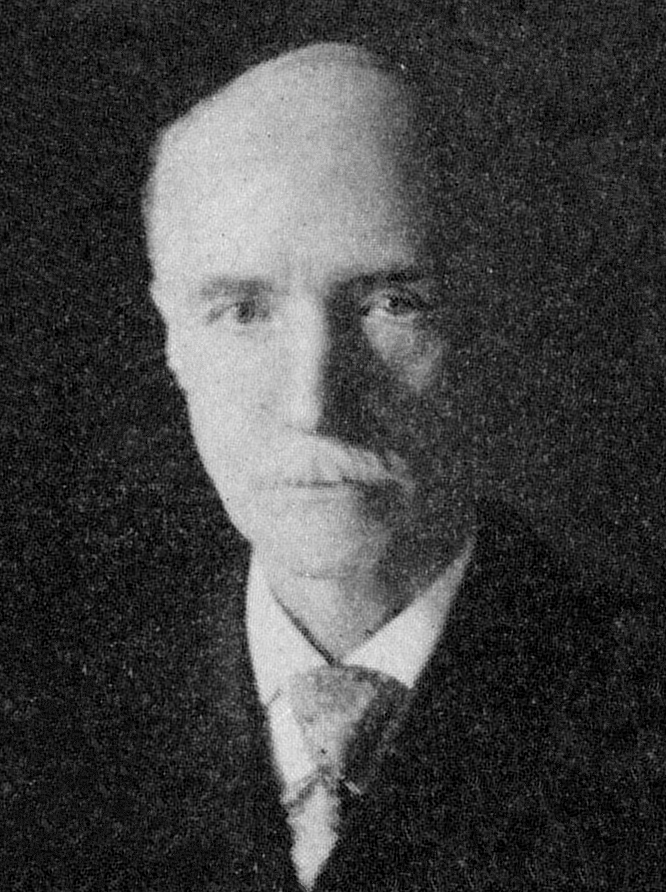
Nominee	John Albert Johnson	Robert C. Dunn
Party	Democratic	Republican
Popular vote	147,992	140,130
Percentage	48.71%	46.13%
- County results Johnson: 40–50% 50–60% 60–70% 70–80% Dunn: 40–50% 50–60% 60–70% 70–80%
Governor before election
Samuel Rinnah Van Sant
Republican
Elected Governor
John Albert Johnson
Democratic

The 1904 Minnesota gubernatorial election took place on November 8, 1904. Democratic Party of Minnesota candidate John Albert Johnson defeated Republican Party of Minnesota challenger Robert C. Dunn. Incumbent Samuel Rinnah Van Sant did not seek a second term.

== Candidates ==
- Andrew W. M. Anderson, chairman of the Socialist Labor Party (Socialist Labor)
- Charles W. Dorsett, attorney (Prohibition)
- Robert C. Dunn, former Minnesota state auditor (Republican)
- John Albert Johnson, State Senator (Democratic)
- Jay E. Nash, Socialist Party of Minnesota founder (Public Ownership)

== Campaigns ==
The Republican State Convention was held on June 29, 1904. Three candidates participated in the primary, Robert C. Dunn, Loren W. Collins, and Frank Eddy. Dunn was nominated. He was popular throughout the state, but was unpopular within the twin cities, which stood staunchly for Collins.

The Democratic State Convention was held on August 25, 1904. Having previously refused in 1902, Johnson's announcement that he would run in 1904 was met with excitement from the Democrats. He was nominated unanimously. There were worries about internal division, as much of the party was still strongly under the influence of former governor (now congressman) John Lind. Despite their political rivalry within their party, Johnson and Lind would make no effort against each other electorally. Despite his popularity Johnson did not actually desire to be governor, later describing the nomination as "unsought and undesired."

Despite an initially slow campaign, Johnson to gain a lead over Dunn, by convincing Republican supporters of Collins to switch and vote Democrat. Dunn, being more conservative than Johnson, was unable to win these more progressive voters back. There were some conservative Democrats who supported Dunn, but not nearly enough to offset Johnson's lead.

== Results ==
1904 gubernatorial election, Minnesota
Party	Candidate	Votes	%	±%
Democratic	John Albert Johnson	147,992	48.71%	+12.03%
Republican	Robert C. Dunn	140,130	46.13%	−11.40%
Prohibition	Charles W. Dorsett	7,577	2.49%	+0.36%
Public Ownership	Jay E. Nash	5,810	1.91%	+0.98%
Socialist Labor	A. W. M. Anderson	2,293	0.76%	−0.19%
Majority		7,862	2.58%	
Turnout		303,802		
Democratic gain from Republican		Swing		

== See also ==
- List of Minnesota gubernatorial elections
