= 1902 Minnesota gubernatorial election =

- November 4, 1902
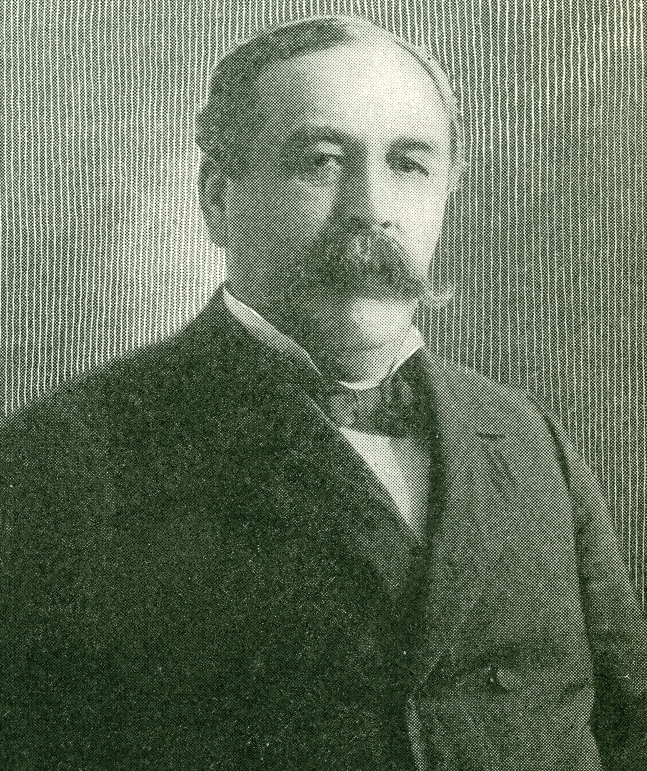

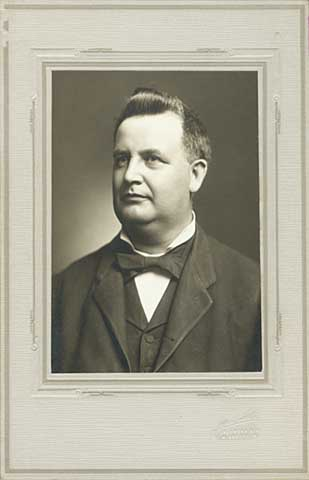
Nominee	Samuel Rinnah Van Sant	Leonard A. Rosing
Party	Republican	Democratic
Popular vote	155,849	99,362
Percentage	57.53%	36.68%
- County results Sant: 40–50% 50–60% 60–70% 70–80% 80–90% Rosing: 40–50% 50–60% 60–70%
Governor before election
Samuel Rinnah Van Sant
Republican
Elected Governor
Samuel Rinnah Van Sant
Republican

The 1902 Minnesota gubernatorial election took place on November 4, 1902. Republican Party of Minnesota incumbent Samuel Rinnah Van Sant defeated Democratic Party of Minnesota challenger Leonard A. Rosing. This would be the last election the Populist Party would contest.

== Candidates ==
- Thomas J. Meighen, member of the state Board of Equalization (Populist)
- Jay E. Nash, Socialist Party of Minnesota founder (Independent)
- Leonard A. Rosing, chair of the Democratic Party (Democrat)
- Charles Scanlon, president of Macalaster College (Prohibition)
- Thomas Van Lear, machinist (Socialist Labor)
- Samuel Rinnah Van Sant, incumbent (Republican)

== Campaigns ==
On June 25, 1902, the Democratic State Convention was held. John Lind was first hoped to be the nominee, but declined to run. It was expected he would be unanimously nominated. The convention then turned to State Senator John Albert Johnson. Johnson, when told he had the votes for the nomination, also turned it down because he did not believe he could win against Van Sant, and he believed himself to be too young.

Once both candidates with a chance of a unanimous nomination had declined, other hopefuls announced they would run. The candidates for the primary ended up as Leonard A. Rosing, State Senator Charles O. Baldwin, and attorney F. D. Larrabie. Christopher D. O'Brien gave a speech in favor of Rosing, turning the momentum towards him. After Lind was renominated, and the motion to renominate him was declared out of order, Larrabie withdrew his candidacy. Baldwin did the same shortly after. Rosing was nominated, saying he would "[r]ather run as a Democrat to certain defeat than to certain victory as a Republican."

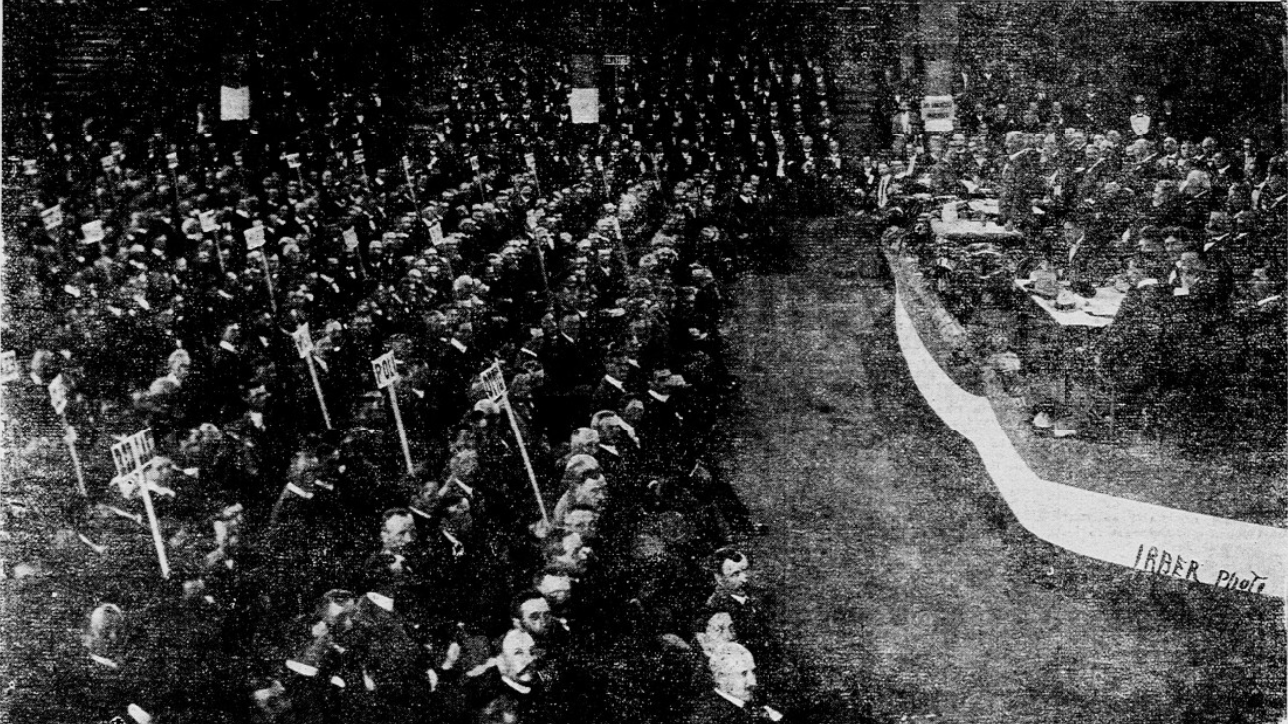
1902 Minnesota Republican State Convention

At the Republican State Convention, on July 1, 1902, Van Sant was unanimously nominated for a second term. Initially, Tams Bixby had been thought to be running for the Republican nomination, but instead, when interviewed, clarified he had no intention of running, and endorsed Van Sant. The campaign was opened, and the convention was ended, by Senator Knute Nelson ceremonially firing a gun.

With Rosing seen as unable to win, the Populists (who otherwise would have supported Lind again) decided not to endorse Rosing. Populist State Representative Ole O. Sageng stated, "They [the Democrats] forget that in 1894, the last time there was a populist state ticket in the field, the Populist candidate for governor received more votes than the Democratic candidate." The populists instead nominated Thomas J. Meighen.

In early October, a coal miner's strike began. At the time, Van Sant was in Chicago. In his absence, Democratic-aligned newspaper the St. Paul Globe claimed that Van Sant was against the strikes and that the workers, not the coal barons, were to blame. Van Sant telegrammed multiple other newspapers to clarify he had made no such statement, and condemned the coal barons for their unwillingness to negotiate with the workers.

Lind and Rosing campaigned together, and praised the progressive Republican president Theodore Roosevelt's policies. Roosevelt was overwhelmingly popular with the labor vote, and the Rosing campaign attempted to draw similarities between the policies of Rosing and Roosevelt to draw further support to them.

Van Sant toured the state as part of his campaign, ending it in the Iron Range, with a speech in Eveleth on November 1. This was part of a larger effort to win the labor vote, which had been very competitive with Democrats since the 1896 election.

The poor chances for Rosing had a minor economic impact, as election betting was a standard practice at the time. Rosing's slim chance resulted in extremely little betting, and what betting there was, was largely over the margin of Van Sant's victory, rather than whose victory it would be. Judge Robert Jamison bet on a Van Sant victory margin of 10,000 votes, which would already be a landslide for Van Sant, but would end up undershooting the actual result by 46,000. Perhaps the least accurate prediction came from the Populist party, who predicted they would have 40,000 votes, a figure ten times the actual figure.

== Results ==
1902 gubernatorial election, Minnesota
Party	Candidate	Votes	%	±%
Republican	Samuel Rinnah Van Sant (incumbent)	155,849	57.53%	+8.86%
Democratic	Leonard A. Rosing	99,362	36.68%	−11.27%
Prohibition	Charles Scanlon	5,765	2.13%	+0.40%
Populist	Thomas J. Meighen	4,821	1.78%	+1.54%
Socialist Labor	Thomas Van Lear	2,570	0.95%	+0.67%
Independent	Jay E. Nash	2,521	0.93%	−0.20%
Majority		56,487	20.85%	
Turnout		270,888		
Republican hold		Swing		

== See also ==
- List of Minnesota gubernatorial elections
