= Thomas Van Lear =

American politician (1869–1931)

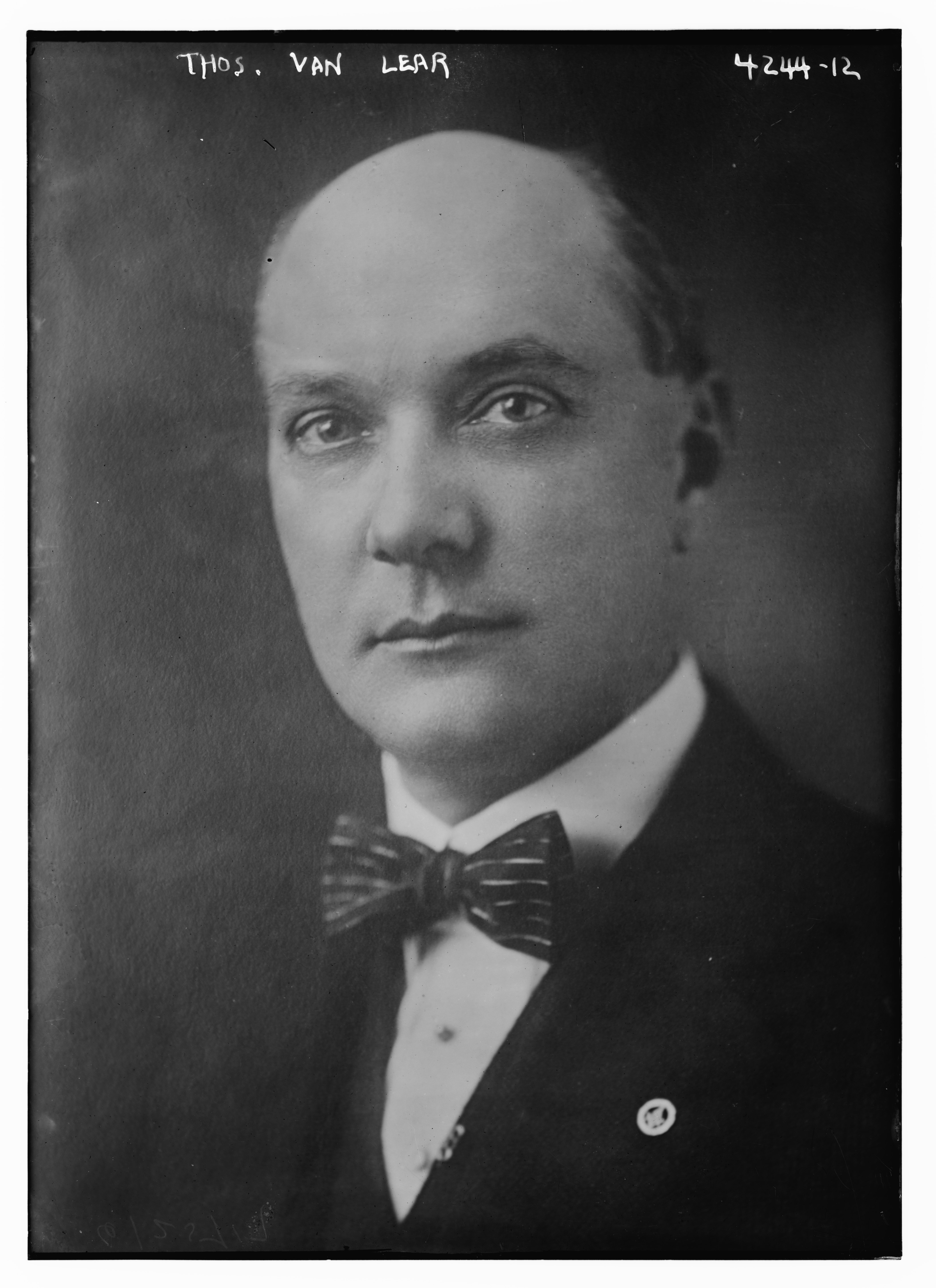
- Van Lear c. 1916

26th Mayor of Minneapolis
- In office January 1, 1917 – January 6, 1919
- Preceded by: Wallace G. Nye
- Succeeded by: J. E. Meyers

Personal details
- Born: April 26, 1869 Maryland, U.S.
- Died: March 4, 1931 (aged 61) Miami, Florida, U.S.
- Party: Socialist
- Profession: Machinist, politician

Thomas H. Van Lear (April 26, 1869 – March 4, 1931) was an American politician who served as the 28th Mayor of Minneapolis from January 1, 1917 to January 6, 1919. Van Lear was a member of the Socialist Party of America.

== Early life ==
Van Lear was born in Maryland in 1869. As a boy, he worked in the area's coal mines and he joined the Knights of Labor on his 18th birthday. In ~1900, he joined the Socialist Party of America. He later served in the United States Army during the Spanish–American War, before relocating to Minneapolis to work as a machinist. He soon became active with the International Association of Machinists and other trade and union groups in the city.

== Career ==
In 1902, Van Lear ran for governor of Minnesota, placing fifth, with only 0.95% of the vote. This was his first entry into electoral politics. Van Lear was capable of gaining support via his oratory skills. He slowly gained support among Minneapolis workers through his criticism of business owners, managers, and strike-breakers.

Van Lear led two unsuccessful campaigns for the mayoralty, in 1910 and 1912. In 1914, he ran for MN-5, finishing second with 33.34% of the vote. He was elected mayor of Minneapolis on November 7, 1916, beating the Republican Sheriff Otto Langum. Van Lear campaigned on greater city control over public transportation, municipal utilities, founding public food markets, and increased education funding. He benefitted from support from progressive Democrats.

=== Mayoralty ===
Van Lear did not win control of the city council, who blocked his proposals for greater control of public transportation and food markets. Van Lear would appoint fellow socialist Lewis Harthill as police chief, who would lead a successful crackdown on illegal gambling, liquor venues, and prostitution, earning him the support of some conservatives.

At the time, the Socialist Party was against entering World War 1, and Van Lear was in favor, causing conflict between him and the party. The Duluth Union Labor Party supported Van Lear in 1916. However, following his electoral victory, he would lose the favor of the DULP due to Van Lear's opposition to American entry into World War I. Van Lear's attempts to please both pro-war and anti-war supporters failed. His pro-war supporters found themselves breaking with Van Lear's party, and his anti-war supporters found themselves breaking with Van Lear himself. He would lost re-election to the conservative J. E. Meyers in 1918, who ran under the 'Loyalist' ticket.

=== Later life ===
In 1919, Van Lear worked with Herbert Gaston to found the populist Minnesota Daily Star newspaper. The first issue was printed in August 1920. While the paper had some success as a political tool, it had a difficult time attracting advertisers and went bankrupt in 1924. Van Lear's last run for political office would be an attempt to return to his position as mayor, in 1921. He would lose the election.

Van Lear died on March 4, 1931 from complications resulting from an inflamed appendix.

== See also ==
- List of elected socialist mayors in the United States
- National Party (United States)

Party political offices
| Preceded by Edward Kriz | Socialist Labor nominee for Governor of Minnesota; 1902 | Succeeded by Andrew W. M. Anderson |
