= Samuel Rinnah Van Sant =

American politician

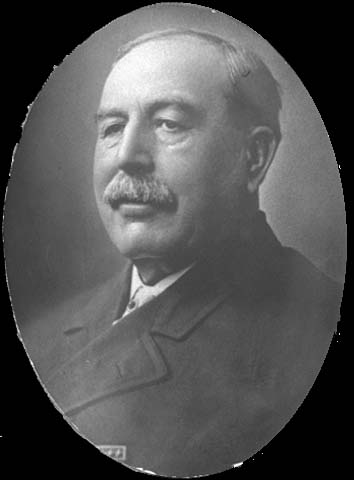

15th Governor of Minnesota
- In office January 7, 1901 – January 4, 1905
- Lieutenant: Lyndon Ambrose Smith; Ray W. Jones
- Preceded by: John Lind
- Succeeded by: John Albert Johnson

22nd Speaker of the Minnesota House of Representatives
- In office 1895–1897
- Preceded by: William E. Lee
- Succeeded by: John D. Jones

Member of the Minnesota House of Representatives
- In office 1893-1897

Personal details
- Born: May 11, 1844 Rock Island, Illinois, United States
- Died: October 3, 1936 (aged 92) Attica, Indiana, United States
- Party: Republican
- Spouse: Ruth Hall
- Profession: Riverboat captain and boat owner – logging transportation

Samuel Rinnah Van Sant (May 11, 1844 – October 3, 1936) was an American politician who served in the Minnesota House of Representatives and as the 15th governor of Minnesota.

== Early life ==
Of Dutch extraction, Van Sant was born in Rock Island, Illinois, to John Wesley Van Sant and Lydia Van Sant (née Anderson). His family had a long history in the shipbuilding industry and his father worked with building and repairing steamboats on the Mississippi River. Van Sant attended school in Rock Island. When the American Civil War began, he attempted to enlist but was rejected as too young. After getting written permission from his father, Van Sant was accepted and served with the 9th Regiment Illinois Volunteer Cavalry for three years before being mustered out.

After the war, Van Sant took business classes in Hudson, New York, and briefly attended Knox College in Illinois before leaving school due to a lack of money. He worked with his father in the shipbuilding trade and helped develop specialized raft boats for moving lumber along the river. In 1883, he relocated to Winona, Minnesota.

== Career ==
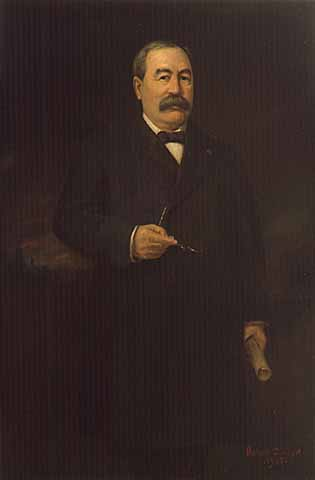
Van Sant as Governor

After arriving in Winona, Van Sant continued to work in the shipbuilding and lumber rafting industries. By the 1890s, he had become financially successful and his company was responsible for moving more lumber down the Mississippi River than any other.

He also became active with local Republican politics. In 1892, he was elected to the Minnesota House of Representatives and served two consecutive terms from 1893 to 1897. In his second term, he served as the Speaker of the House.

In 1900, he ran for governor against incumbent John Lind and won, serving two terms, from 1901 to 1905. As governor, Van Sant filed a lawsuit against the Northern Securities Company railroad trust arguing that its formation violated a state law. His case was later taken up at the federal level by President Theodore Roosevelt and, in the 1904 United States Supreme court case Northern Securities Co. v. United States, the company was dissolved. He was also involved in legislation which updated the state's election process and removed restrictions on the state legislature's taxation and spending powers.

After serving as Governor Van Sant retired from politics. He was commander in chief of the Grand Army of the Republic from 1909 to 1910.

He died in 1936 in Attica, Indiana, age 92. He is buried in Glendale Cemetery in Le Claire, Iowa.

The Samuel Van Sant House in Le Claire, Iowa is listed on the National Register of Historic Places.

Party political offices
Preceded by William Henry Eustis	Republican nominee for Governor of Minnesota; 1900, 1902	Succeeded by Robert C. Dunn
Political offices
Preceded by John Lind	Governor of Minnesota; 1901 – 1905	Succeeded by John Albert Johnson
Preceded by William E. Lee	Speaker of the Minnesota House of Representatives; 1895 – 1897	Succeeded by John D. Jones
