= 1859 Minnesota gubernatorial election =

- November 8, 1859
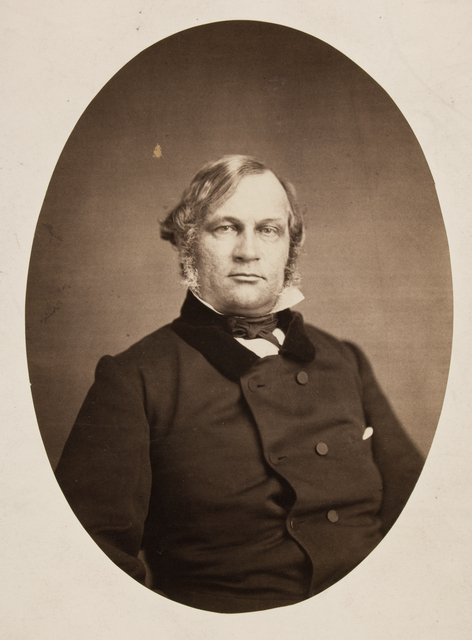

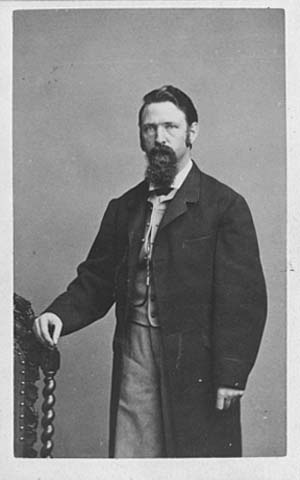
Nominee	Alexander Ramsey	George Loomis Becker
Party	Republican	Democratic
Popular vote	21,335	17,582
Percentage	54.82%	45.18%
- County results Ramsey: 50–60% 60–70% 70–80% 80–90% Becker: 50–60% 60–70% 80–90% Unknown/no vote
Governor before election
Henry Hastings Sibley
Democratic
Elected Governor
Alexander Ramsey
Republican

The 1859 Minnesota gubernatorial election was held on November 8, 1859, to elect the governor of Minnesota. Incumbent Democratic governor Henry Hastings Sibley did not seek a second term.

== Candidates ==
- George Loomis Becker, former mayor of St. Paul (Democrat)
- Alexander Ramsey, former territorial governor and candidate for governor in 1857 (Republican)

== Campaigns ==
On July 18, 1859, Ramsey was summoned to the Republican State Convention. On July 20, he was nominated by the Convention to run for governor a second time.

Democratic nominee George L. Becker found himself unable to make the race very competitive, due to a lack of political experience and name recognition.

== Results ==
Minnesota gubernatorial election, 1859
Party	Candidate	Votes	%
Republican	Alexander Ramsey	21,335	54.82
Democratic	George Loomis Becker	17,582	45.18
Total votes		38,917	100
Republican gain from Democratic			

Becker performed better than expected, especially in his hometown of St. Paul, which resulted in some alarm from Ramsey while results were still being counted, until Ramsey ultimately won.
