= John Albert Johnson =

American politician (1861–1909)

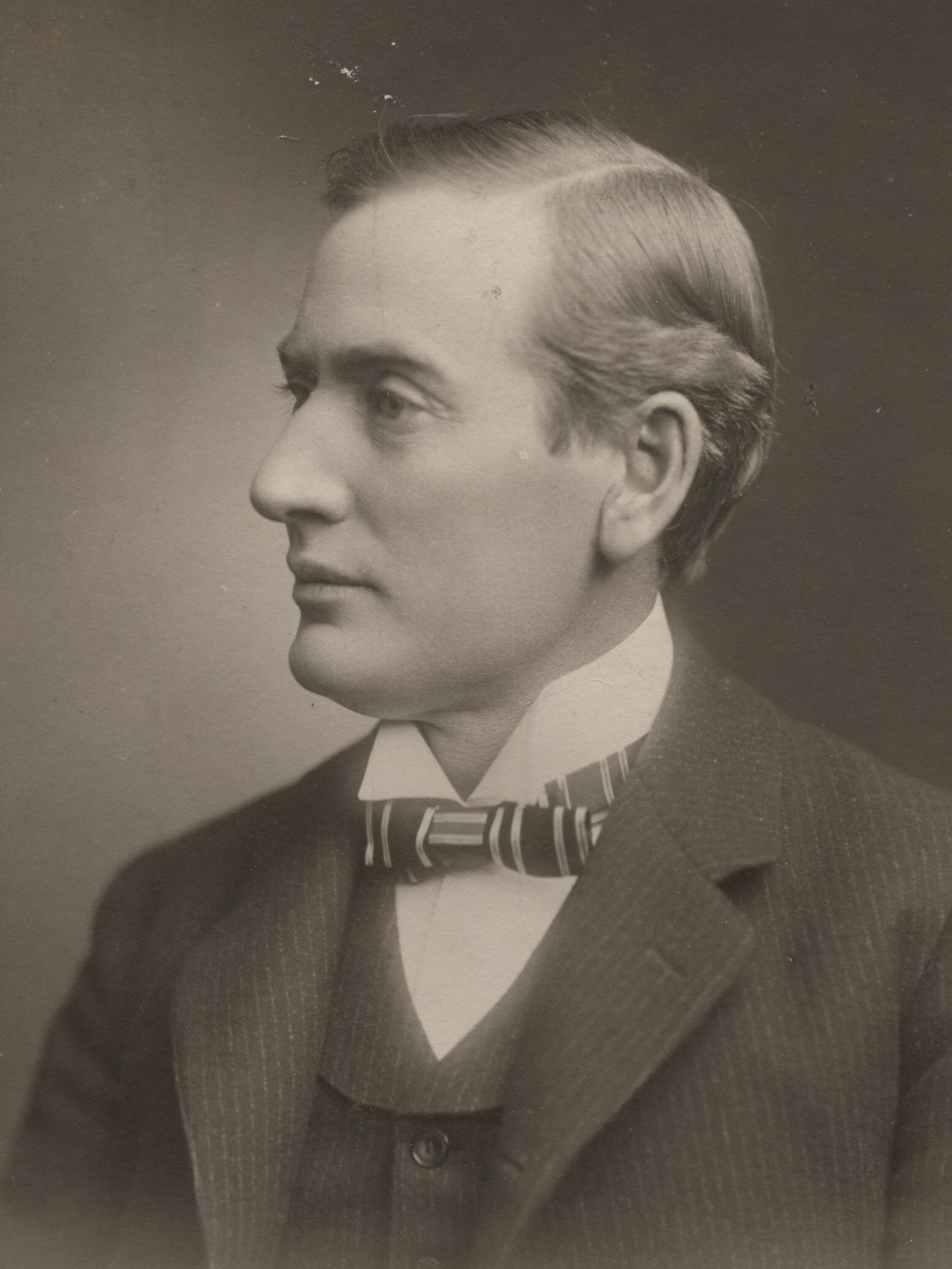
- Official portrait, c. 1905

16th Governor of Minnesota
- In office January 4, 1905 – September 21, 1909
- Lieutenant: Ray W. Jones; Adolph Olson Eberhart
- Preceded by: Samuel Rinnah Van Sant
- Succeeded by: Adolph Olson Eberhart

Personal details
- Born: July 28, 1861 St. Peter, Minnesota, US
- Died: September 21, 1909 (aged 48) Rochester, Minnesota, US
- Party: Democratic
- Spouse: Elinore "Nora" Preston (m. 1894)
- Profession: Politician

John Albert Johnson (July 28, 1861 – September 21, 1909) was an American politician. He served in the Minnesota State Senate from January 1897 to January 1901. He was the 16th governor of Minnesota from January 4, 1905, until his death on September 21, 1909, as a member of the Democratic Party.

Johnson was the first Minnesota governor born in Minnesota. He was only the second non-Republican governor in 45 years and the third since statehood. He was also first to serve a full term in the present state capitol, and the first to die in office. Johnson sought the 1908 Democratic presidential nomination but lost to William Jennings Bryan.

== Biography ==
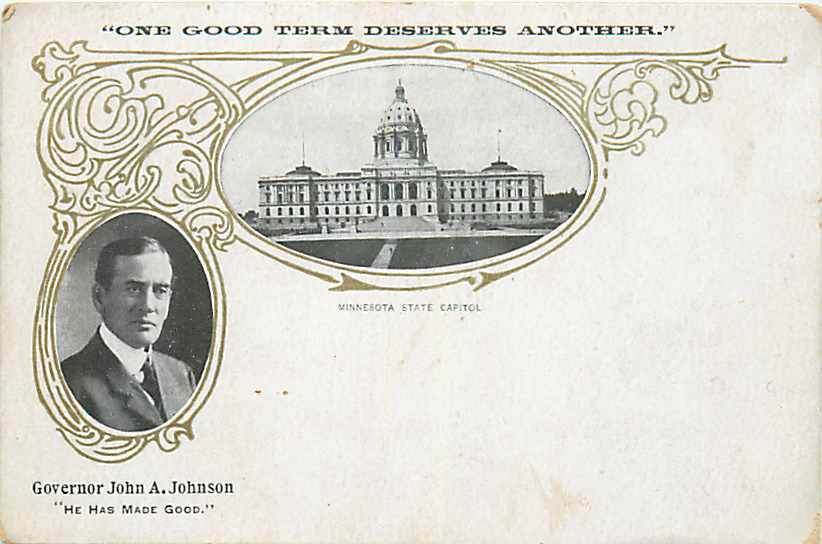
Governor Johnson re-election mailing card

John Albert Johnson was born on a farm near St. Peter, Minnesota, on July 28, 1861, the eldest child of Gustaf and Caroline Johnson. After Gustaf abandoned his family, John left school at 13 to support his mother and siblings. During this time, he worked at a local drugstore. After that, he had a seven-year-long stint in the Minnesota National guard, where he reached the rank of captain. Local Democrats, impressed with the enterprising young store clerk, asked him to join their party and edit the strongly Democratic St. Peter Herald. Before he could take the position, he became seriously ill with typhoid fever, but he recovered. His journalistic success attracted statewide attention and fostered political aspirations.

Johnson married Elinor M. Preston on June 1, 1894, at the Union Presbyterian Church in St. Peter.

Johnson failed in early campaigns for state office from his heavily Republican home county but was elected to the state senate in 1898, indicating his growing bipartisan appeal.

Johnson declined to run for governor in 1902, but reluctantly accepted the nomination in 1904. He said he did not want to be governor, later calling the nomination "unsought and undesired".

== Governor ==
Several reforms of a progressive nature were carried out during Johnson's tenure. In his 1904 inauguration speech, Johnson called for the 2-year term to be extended to 4 years, more funding for roads, more funding to rural schools, and several other important ideas. Johnson's ability to reason and work with legislators of both parties resulted in such reform legislation as a reorganization of the state's insurance department to the benefit of policyholders, reduction of railroad passenger and freight rates, and removal of constitutional restraints on the legislature's power to tax. Johnson was reelected in 1906 and 1908. He began his third term with reservations.

At that point, Johnson had had over four surgeries for his intestinal problems and wanted to pursue a promising sideline as a public orator. His chronic illness forced him to go to the Mayo Clinic again on September 13, 1909. He died suddenly at age 48 from post-operative complications, which included an infection.

The death penalty existed in Minnesota until Johnson's successor, Adolph Olson Eberhart, abolished it, but Johnson's personal opposition to it resulted in all death sentences during his tenure being commuted. Johnson said he would rather resign than allow an execution under his administration.

== Legacy ==
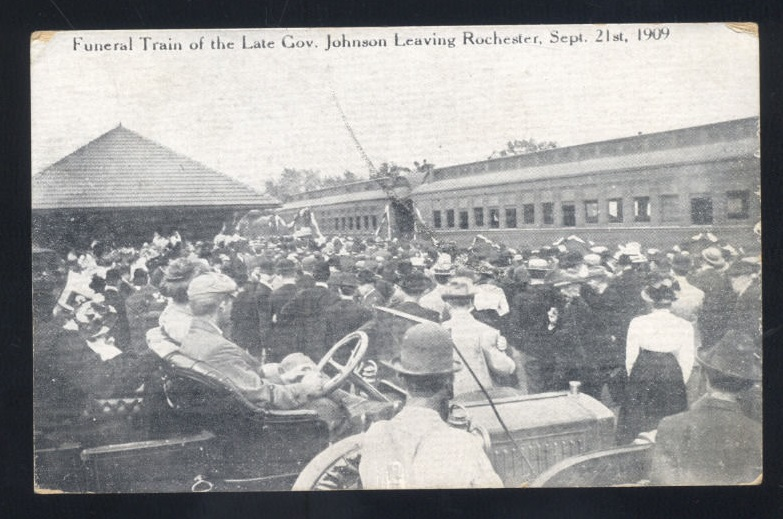
Governor Johnson's funeral train leaving Rochester, Minnesota

Johnson was the first of three governors to die in office. Governor Winfield Scott Hammond was the second, after suffering a stroke in 1915. Floyd B. Olson was the third and most recent, dying of cancer in 1936.

Statues of Johnson are on the steps of the Minnesota State Capitol and the grounds of the Nicollet County Courthouse. Johnson Senior High School in St. Paul is named for him, as is the portion of U.S. Route 169 from Saint Peter to the Twin Cities.

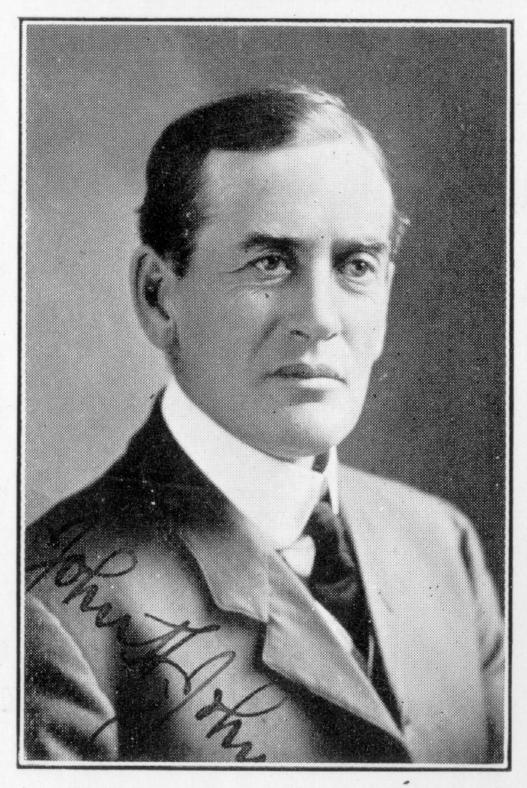
Johnson, c. 1905–1909

The John A. Johnson School in Virginia, Minnesota was built in 1907.

Party political offices
Preceded by Leonard A. Rosing	Democratic nominee for Governor of Minnesota; 1904, 1906, 1908	Succeeded by James Gray
Political offices
Preceded by Samuel Rinnah Van Sant	Governor of Minnesota; 1905 – 1909	Succeeded by Adolph Olson Eberhart
