= Union Presbyterian Church (St. Peter, Minnesota) =

Historic church in Minnesota, United States

- U.S. National Register of Historic Places
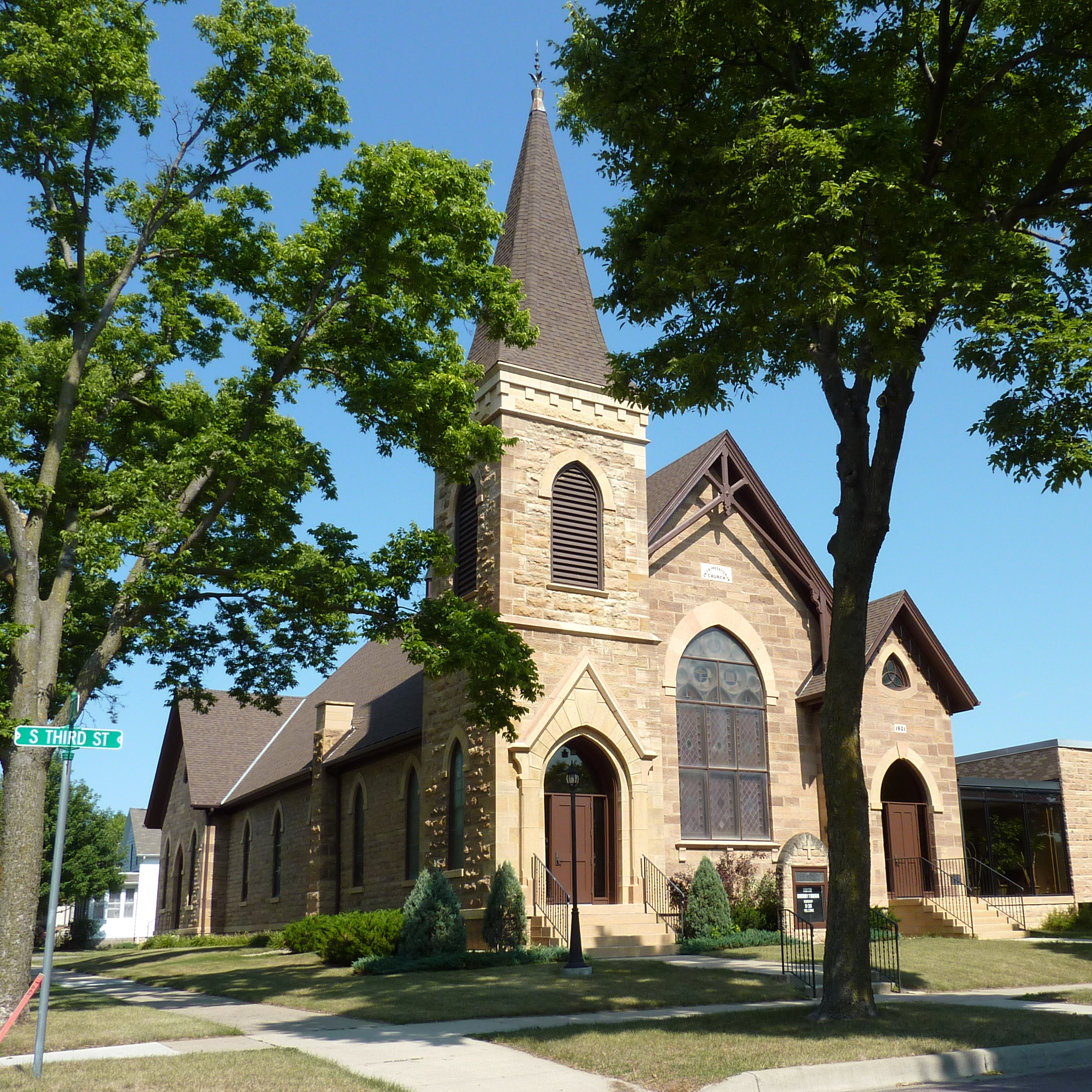

- Location within Minnesota Location within the United States
- Location: 730 S. Third St., St. Peter, Minnesota
- Coordinates: 44°19′15″N 93°57′44″W
- Area: less than one acre
- Built: 1871
- Architect: Abraham M. Radcliffe
- Architectural style: Gothic
- NRHP reference No.: 83000922
- Added to NRHP: May 19, 1983

Union Presbyterian Church is a historic church at 730 S. Third Street in St. Peter, Minnesota.

The community's origins date back to 1843, when Reverend Stephen Return Riggs established a mission post at Traverse des Sioux. The mission operated until 1851, when the Treaty of Traverse des Sioux was signed. In 1853, the First Free Presbyterian Church of Traverse Des Sioux was established with 12 members. They used the mission church until 1858, when a new stone church was built at a cost of $5000. A mile and a half south, in the town of St. Peter, Reverend Aaron H. Kerr led services in the Winslow Hotel. On October 25, 1857, Rev. Kerr established the First Presbyterian Church of St. Peter. During the Dakota War of 1862, many refugees from the Traverse des Sioux area moved to the safety of St. Peter. On July 25, 1869, the two congregations merged and became the Union Presbyterian Church of St. Peter. They built a new church building in 1871 for $15,000, taking the bell from the church at Traverse des Sioux. The building was listed on the National Register of Historic Places in 1983.
