= 1900 Minnesota gubernatorial election =

- November 6, 1900
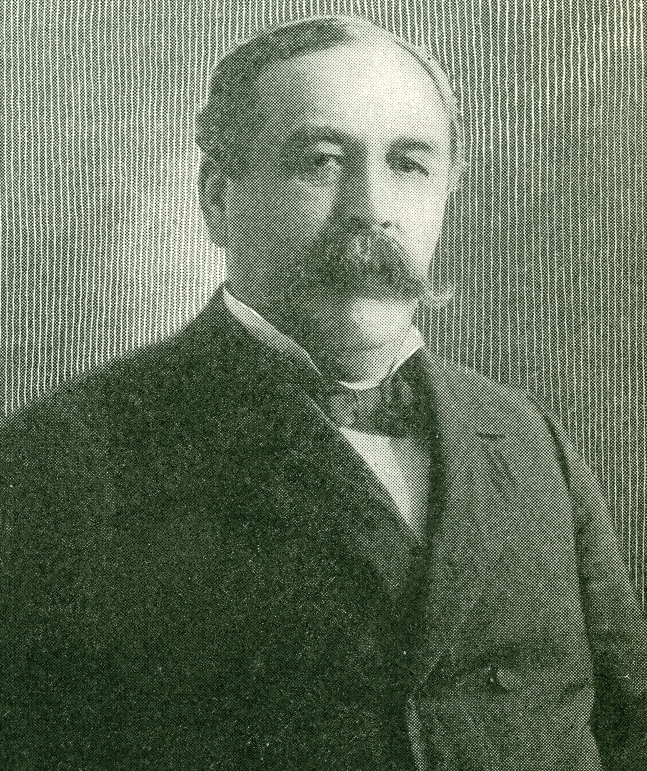

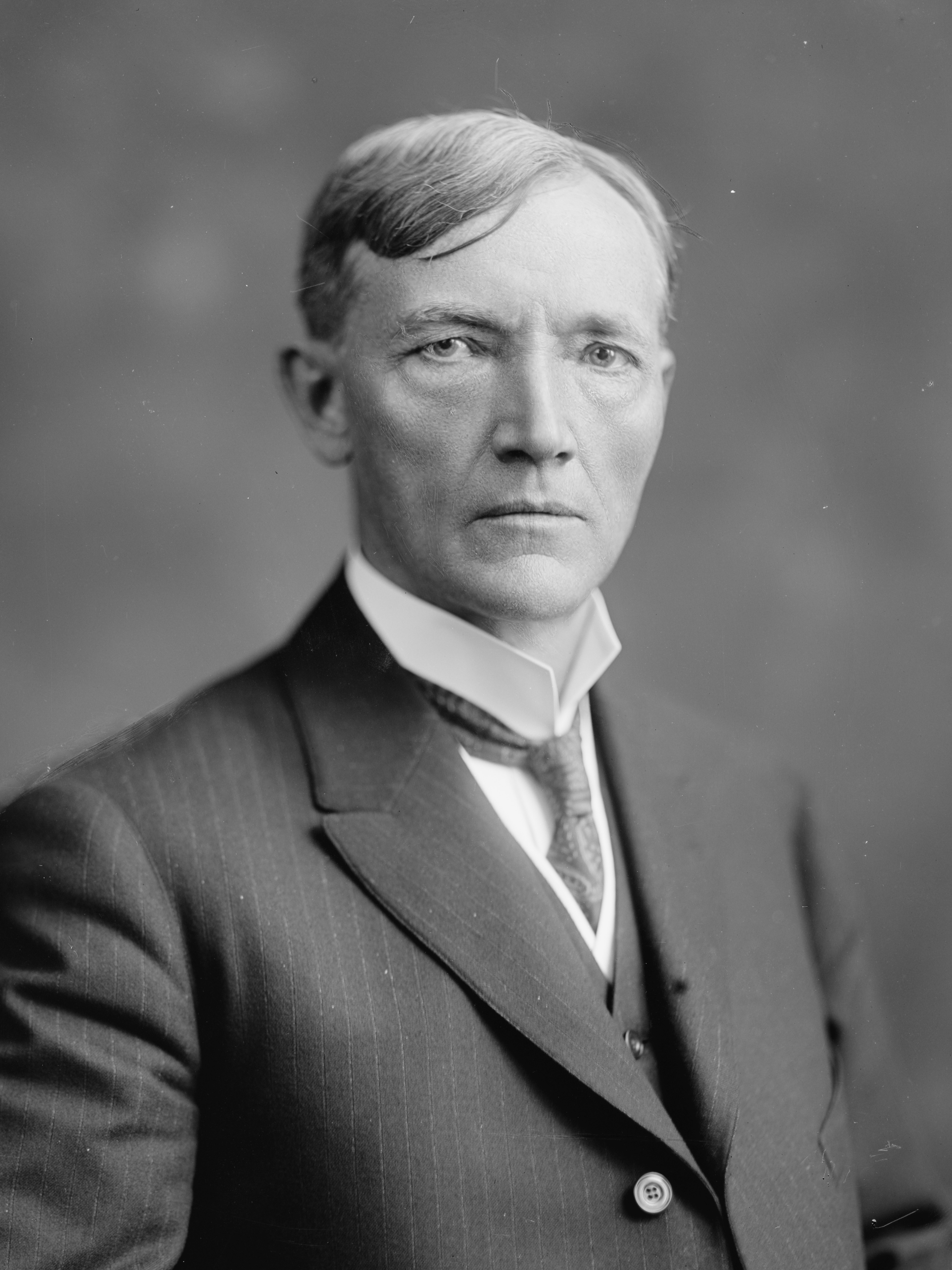
Nominee	Samuel Rinnah Van Sant	John Lind
Party	Republican	Democratic
Alliance		People's Party
Popular vote	152,905	150,651
Percentage	48.67%	47.95%
- County results Sant: 40–50% 50–60% 60–70% Lind: 40–50% 50–60% 60–70% 70–80%
Governor before election
John Lind
Democratic-People's
Elected Governor
Samuel Rinnah Van Sant
Republican

The 1900 Minnesota gubernatorial election took place on November 6, 1900. Republican Party of Minnesota candidate Samuel Rinnah Van Sant narrowly defeated incumbent Democratic Party of Minnesota Governor John Lind. This was the third of three successive elections in which Lind headed a coalition of the Democrats with the People's Party.

== Candidates ==
- Sylvester M. Fairchild, retired farmer (Midroad-Populist)
- Bernt B. Haugan, minister (Prohibition)
- Edward Kriz, boilermaker (Socialist Labor)
- John Lind, incumbent (Democratic, Populist)
- Thomas H. Lucas, former member of the Minnesota House of Representatives (Social Democratic)
- Samuel Rinnah Van Sant, former speaker of the Minnesota House of Representatives (Republican)

== Campaigns ==
The Republican State Convention was held on June 21, 1900. As the Republicans were not running as incumbents for the first time since 1859, the stakes were high for them. Van Sant was nominated unanimously.

Lind had opposition from within the Democratic party, but faced much more opposition from within the Populist party. Running a primary campaign against him was Adolphe Paradis. The Populist convention, held August 30, 1900, split, with one behind Paradis, and another, nicknamed the 'Bolter's Convention', nominating Lind. Paradis would not continue his run for governor independently of Lind, instead asking Lind to return to the convention for a "fair fight", and a primary. Lind did not return to the Populist convention, and as Paradis was no longer officially running, Lind won by default. Within the Democratic party, Lind faced continued opposition from party boss Michael Doran. Doran stated, "Let him get the nomination. He will be slaughtered at the polls."

Van Sant and Lind competed for the labor vote, and both advocated in favor of legal trade unions. Lind mostly adopted the labor policy already championed by Van Sant.

Van Sant campaigned with Joseph Bobleter on a statewide tour, giving speeches in nearly every town, including New Ulm, Lind's hometown.

== Results ==
1900 gubernatorial election, Minnesota
Party	Candidate	Votes	%	±%
Republican	Samuel Rinnah Van Sant	152,905	48.67%	+4.41%
Democratic-People's	John Lind (incumbent)	150,651	47.95%	−4.31%
Prohibition	Bernt B. Haugan	5,430	1.73%	−0.37%
Social Democratic	Thomas H. Lucas	3,546	1.13%	n/a
Socialist Labor	Edward Kriz	886	0.28%	−0.39%
Midroad-Populist	Sylvester M. Fairchild	763	0.24%	−0.47%
	Write-ins	2	0.00%	
Majority		2,254	0.72%	
Turnout		314,183		
Republican gain from Democratic				

== See also ==
- List of Minnesota gubernatorial elections
