= 1867 Minnesota gubernatorial election =

- November 5, 1867
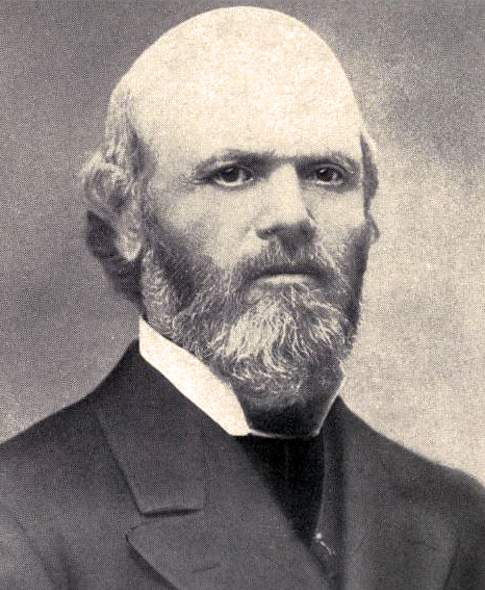

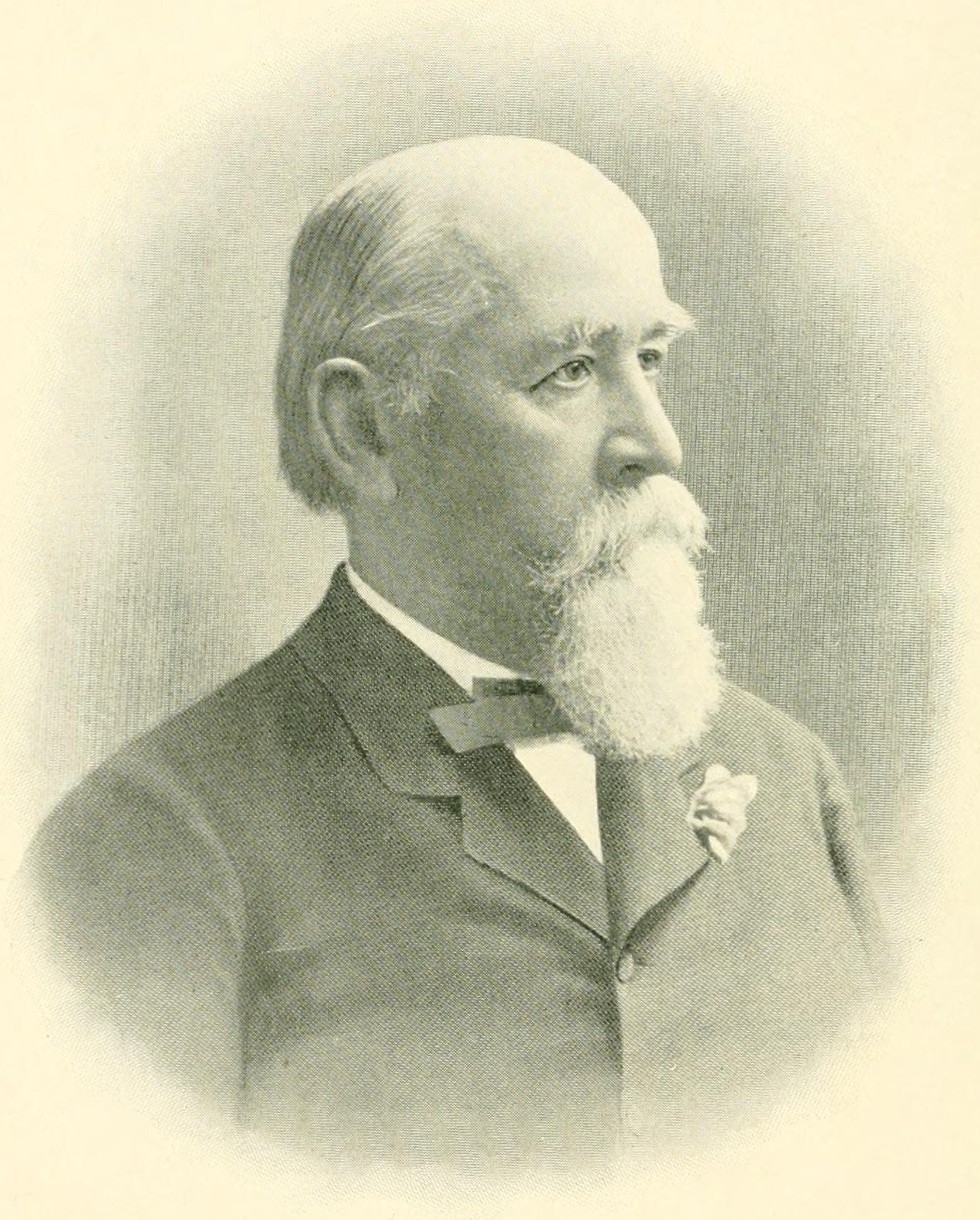
Nominee	William Rainey Marshall	Charles Eugene Flandrau
Party	Republican	Democratic
Popular vote	34,874	29,502
Percentage	54.16%	45.82%
- County results Marshall: 50–60% 60–70% 70–80% 80–90% 90–100% Flandrau: 50–60% 60–70% 70–80% 80–90% 90–100% Unknown/no vote
Governor before election
William Rainey Marshall
Republican
Elected Governor
William Rainey Marshall
Republican

The 1867 Minnesota gubernatorial election was held on November 5, 1867, to elect the governor of Minnesota. Incumbent governor William Rainey Marshall was reelected to a second term.

== Candidates ==
- Charles Eugene Flandrau, associate justice of the Minnesota Supreme Court (Democrat)
- William Rainey Marshall, incumbent (Republican)

== Campaigns ==
The Democratic State Convention took place on July 10, 1867. Flandrau was nominated without opposition, and voted by acclamation. Flandrau was not actually present at the convention. The party took a clear stance against Black suffrage in the state, a policy Governor Marshall had attempted to pass previously. Like the Democratic nominee before him, Henry Mower Rice, Flandrau had difficulties in proving to the public he had no Confederate sympathies. Flandrau had an advantage, being a veteran, but never fought the Confederacy, only the Dakota, in combat. Flandrau had also been an opponent of the war and refused to join the Union Army for any purpose of aggression against the Confederates, damaging his credibility further.

On September 7, 1867, the Republican State Convention took place. Every attending delegate had already pledged to re-nominate Marshall before the Convention even began. Marshall was renominated unanimously.

In mid-September of 1867, Flandrau gave a speech using racial slurs, garnering him national attention for his explicit opposition to protections for African-Americans and support for racial violence. Secretary of State William H. Seward urged Minnesotans not to vote for Flandrau.

== Results ==
Minnesota gubernatorial election, 1867
Party	Candidate	Votes	%
Republican	William Rainey Marshall (incumbent)	34,874	54.16
Democratic	Charles Eugene Flandrau	29,502	45.82
	Write-Ins	9	0.01
Total votes		64,385	100
Republican hold			
