= Minnesota Democratic Party =

- Founded: 1849
- Dissolved: 1944
- Merged into: Minnesota Democratic–Farmer–Labor Party
- Ideology: Liberalism (US); Progressive (faction), Conservativism (faction, pre-1898)
- Political position: Center-left, Right (faction, pre-1898)
- National affiliation: Democratic Party

The Minnesota Democratic Party was a political party in Minnesota that existed from the formation of Minnesota Territory in 1849 until 1944, when the party merged with the Minnesota Farmer–Labor Party to form the modern Minnesota Democratic–Farmer–Labor Party.

== History ==
=== Territorial Era ===
The Democratic Party held rule over the Minnesota Territory from 1853 until statehood. This was because the Presidents at this time were Democrats, who in turn appointed Democrat leadership in the territory. In 1857, Territorial governor Samuel Medary created the Dakota Land Company, owned directly by the Democratic party. The company was granted the authority to purchase, or simply claim, any land in the Minnesota Territory. It was also given license to construct buildings and industry, and exclusive rights to operate ferries across the Missouri River, Big Sioux River, and James River for twenty years. The purpose of this was voter manipulation in the 1857 elections. On October 28, 1857, the Dakota Land Company reported that in the counties they had settled, Sibley won 221 out of 223 votes - 99.1% of votes. A board was created to investigate claims of corruption; however, the board would be led by Samuel Medary, Joseph R. Brown, and other Dakota Land Company directors. The board would eliminate a few votes, however declared Democrat Henry Hastings Sibley the victor by only 240 votes.

=== Post-Statehood ===
In the first two years after Minnesota's admission into the Union in 1858, the Minnesota Democratic Party was briefly the dominant party in the state; however, the 1860 presidential election and the Civil War dealt a devastating blow to the party from which it never truly recovered. Between 1860 and 1918, the Minnesota Democratic Party was a distant second party to the dominant Republican Party. During that period, Democrats held the office of Governor of Minnesota for a grand total of seven years, never controlled either chamber of the Minnesota Legislature, and Minnesota never cast a single electoral vote in favor of a Democratic presidential nominee.

The party struggled to regain popularity in the wake of the Civil War. Its gubernatorial nominees struggled to dispel rumors of Confederate sympathies. In 1867, the party nominated Charles Eugene Flandrau for governor, an outspoken pro-confederate who encouraged racial violence in the south. Following his defeat, the party instead nominated a progressive, George L. Otis. When he failed to win, they nominated Winthrop Young. Young's campaign collapsed in scandal. The party would continue to nominate more moderate conservatives until 1886, when A. A. Ames was nominated. Despite being more progressive candidate, his nomination was so divisive within the party that nearly the entire progressive wing was expelled in the wake of his defeat. After further failed attempts at running conservative candidates, the party was finally brought into the control of the populist wing, who collaborated with the Populist Party to elect John Lind as governor in 1898. The Populist wing would then dominate the party, later becoming progressive and liberal factions.

=== After 1900 ===
The fusion of Populists, German and Irish Catholics, progressives, and urban laborers brought victory to John Albert Johnson in 1904. Governor Johnson would be a candidate for the Democratic National Convention in 1908, but lost to William Jennings Bryan. His administration championed progressive reform, but he would die in 1909, after being reelected for a third term. During the Taft Administration and into the 1910s, Democrats began to see significant defections to Socialist Party candidates (between 1903-1913 Public Ownership Party). In 1914, Congressman Winfield Scott Hammond was elected governor, but died the following year. He was succeeded by Republican Joseph A. A. Burnquist, as lieutenant governors were then elected on a separate ticket.

Following the establishment of the Farmer-Labor Party in 1918, the Minnesota Democratic Party was relegated to third party status, as the Farmer-Laborites became the primary opposition to the Republicans.

==== Rise of the Farmer-Labor Party ====
For much of the 1920s, Farmer-Labor and Democratic candidates split the vote, allowing Republicans to dominate all state offices. In the midst of the Great Depression, then-Hennepin County Attorney Floyd B. Olson won the 1930 Gubernatorial Election. Democratic strength was relegated to German-Catholic areas like Scott County and Le Sueur County, and Stearns County and Morrison County in Central Minnesota. In the 1930 Senate Election, Democratic candidate Einar Hoidale would narrowly lose to incumbent Thomas Schall. Hoidale would be the party's highest vote getter in the at-large congressional elections in 1932.

During the 1930s, a political alliance between Minnesota Governor Floyd B. Olson and President Franklin D. Roosevelt bred closer cooperation between the Farmer-Laborites and the Democrats. With a large backing from Farmer-Laborites, Roosevelt became the first Democrat ever to win Minnesota's electoral votes in 1932, and went on to win the state in each of his re-election bids. In the 1936 gubernatorial election the Democratic Party opted not to run its own candidate for Governor, endorsing Farmer-Labor candidate Elmer Austin Benson instead.

After the Farmer-Laborites' spectacular fall from power in the 1938 general election, there was increasing pressure from the national Democratic Party for a merger between the Minnesota Democratic Party and the Farmer-Labor Party. In spite of substantial minorities in both parties continuing to oppose merging, the majority in the Farmer-Labor Party led by former Governor Benson and the slim majority of the Minnesota Democratic Party led by future Vice President Hubert H. Humphrey ultimately concluded such a merger in 1944, creating the Minnesota Democratic-Farmer-Labor Party.

== Gubernatorial nominees ==
Year	Nominee	Votes	Percent	Won
1857	Henry Hastings Sibley	17,790	50.34	Yes
1859	George Loomis Becker	17,582	45.18	No
1861	Edward O. Hamblin	10,448	39.1	No
1863	Henry T. Welles	12,739	39.36	No
1865	Henry Mower Rice	13,842	44.42	No
1867	Charles Eugene Flandrau	29,502	45.83	No
1869	George L. Otis	25,401	46.6	No
1871	Winthrop Young	30,376	38.86	No
1873	Asa Barton	35,245	47.56	No
1875	David L. Buell	35,275	42.03	No
1877	William L. Banning	39,147	39.13	No
1879	Edmund Rice	41,524	39.11	No
1881	Richard W. Johnson	37,168	35.21	No
1883	Adolph Biermann	58,251	42.95	No
1886	A. A. Ames	104,464	47.36	No
1888	Eugene McLanahan Wilson	110,251	42.14	No
1890	Thomas Wilson	85,844	35.63	No
1892	Daniel W. Lawler	94,600	36.96	No
1894	George Loomis Becker	53,584	18.09	No
1896	John Lind (Note: In each of his three appearances on the general election ballot for Governor, John Lind ran at the head of a coalition consisting of the Democratic Party, the Silver Republican Party, and the majority faction of the People's Party, and his party affiliation is listed as "P/DSR" (Populist/Democratic Silver Republican) in the list of Minnesota Governors compiled by the Minnesota Legislative Reference Library.)	162,254	48.11	No
1898	John Lind	131,980	52.26	Yes
1900	John Lind	150,651	47.95	No
1902	Leonard A. Rosing	99,362	36.68	No
1904	John Albert Johnson	147,992	48.71	Yes
1906	John Albert Johnson	168,480	60.93	Yes
1908	John Albert Johnson	175,136	51.93	Yes
1910	James Gray	103,779	35.23	No
1912	Peter M. Ringdal	99,659	31.3	No
1914	Winfield S. Hammond	156,304	45.54	Yes
1916	Thomas P. Dwyer	93,112	23.84	No
1918	Fred Wheaton	76,793	19.71	No
1920	Laurence C. Hodgson	81,293	10.37	No
1922	Edward Indrehus	79,903	11.66	No
1924	Carlos Avery	49,353	5.91	No
1926	Alfred Jacques	38,008	5.42	No
1928	Andrew Nelson	213,734	21.38	No
1930	Edward Indrehus	29,109	3.65	No
1932	John E. Regan	169,859	16.44	No
1934	John E. Regan	176,928	16.84	No
1936	No candidate (Note: In 1936, the Democratic Party did not field a gubernatorial nominee, instead opting to support Farmer-Labor nominee Elmer Austin Benson. Fred A. Curtis was nominated, but dropped out.)			No
1938	Thomas F. Gallagher	65,875	5.81	No
1940	Edward Murphy	140,021	11.21	No
1942	John D. Sullivan	75,151	9.46	No

== See also ==
- Democratic Party (United States)
- Minnesota Democratic-Farmer-Labor Party
- Politics of Minnesota
- Political party strength in Minnesota
