= 1912 Minnesota gubernatorial election =

- November 5, 1912
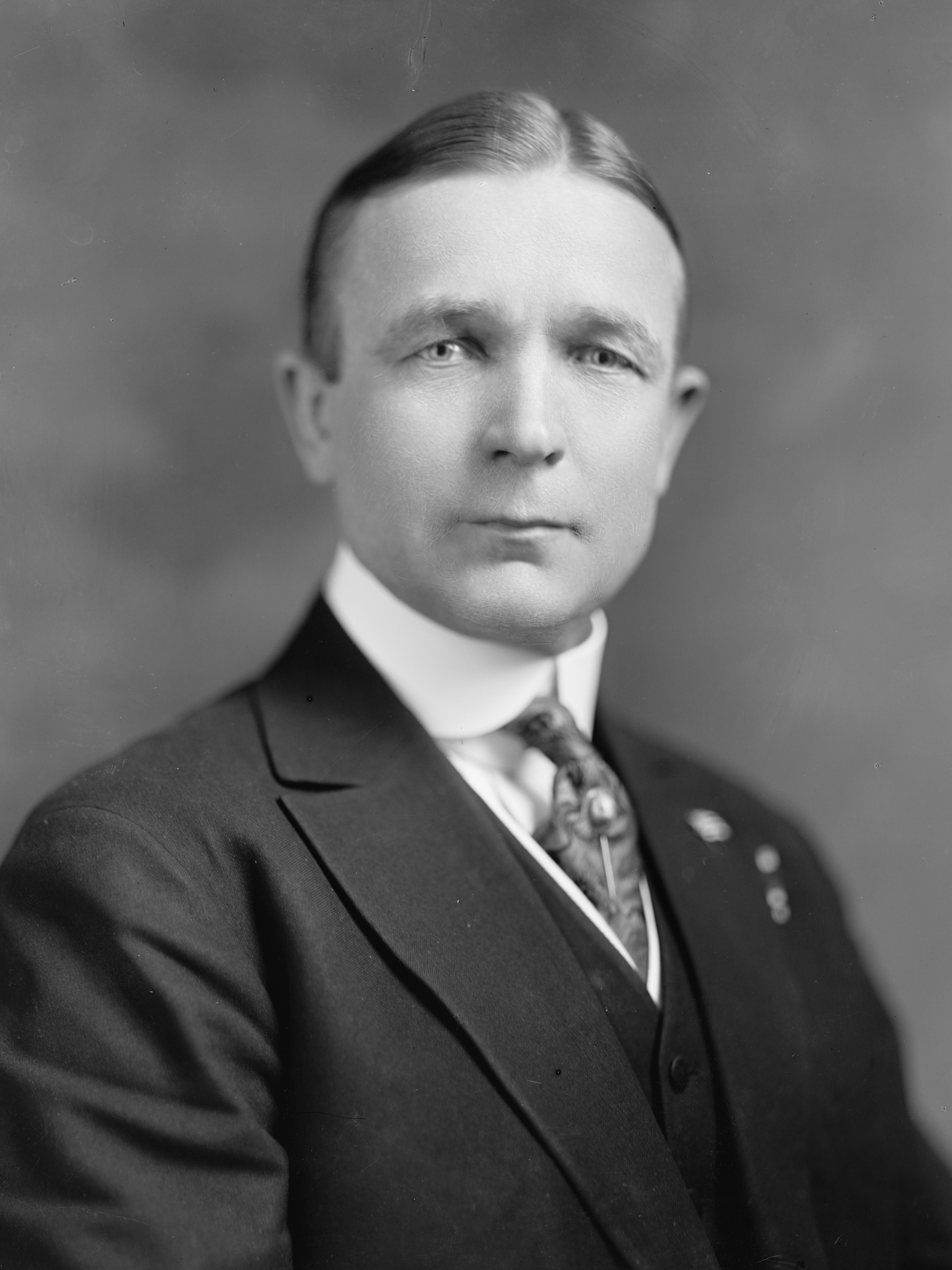

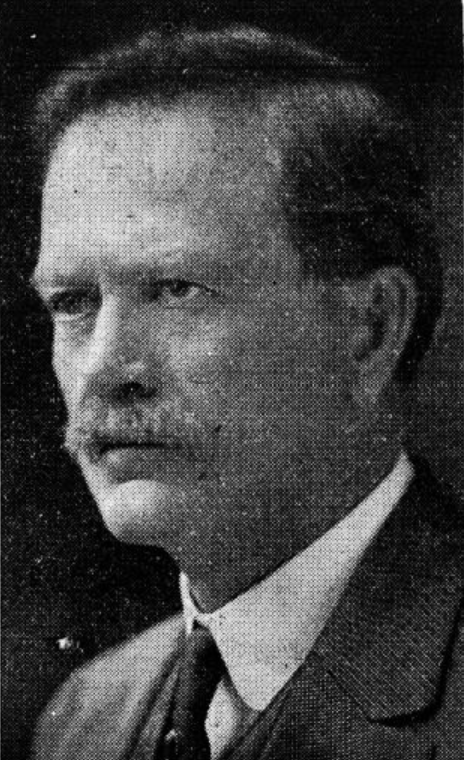

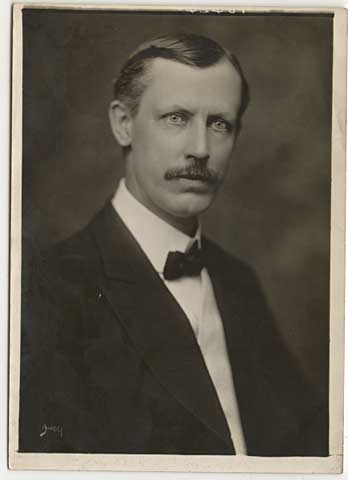

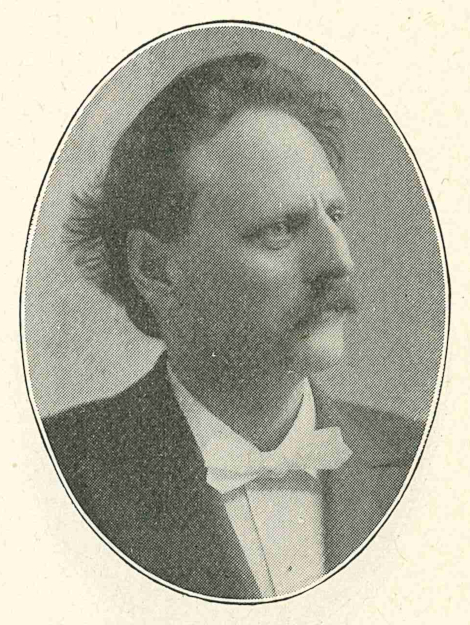

Nominee	Adolph Olson Eberhart	Peter M. Ringdal	Paul V. Collins
Party	Republican	Democratic	Progressive
Popular vote	129,688	99,659	33,455
Percentage	40.73%	31.30%	10.51%
Nominee	Engebret E. Lobeck	David Morgan
Party	Prohibition	Public Ownership
Popular vote	29,876	25,769
Percentage	9.38%	8.09%
- County results Eberhart: 30–40% 40–50% 50–60% Ringdal: 30–40% 40–50% 50–60% Lobeck: 30–40% Morgan: 30–40%
Governor before election
Adolph O. Eberhart
Republican
Elected Governor
Adolph Olson Eberhart
Republican

The 1912 Minnesota gubernatorial election took place on November 5, 1912. Republican Party of Minnesota incumbent Adolph Olson Eberhart defeated Democratic Party of Minnesota challenger Peter M. Ringdal, Progressive Party challenger Paul V. Collins, and two other third-party candidates with unusually strong showings.

== Republican primary ==
=== Background ===
In 1909, then-Lieutenant Governor Adolph Eberhart ascended to the governorship after the death of Democratic Governor John A. Johnson. Eberhart entered office during a time of political upheaval in Minnesota.

The Democrats had not won the governorship in Minnesota from 1860 until nearly 1900, when John Lind was elected governor in 1898 in a union ticket with the People's Party. Since then, Democrats had been able to consolidate significant third-party movements in Minnesota and had won the governorship in 1904, 1906, and 1908 under Governor John A. Johnson, whose reforms had won him bipartisan appeal. He was compared to Abraham Lincoln and was hailed as an "idol of the people."

However, Democrats had not successfully consolidated all third parties in Minnesota. The Prohibition Party, formerly allied with the Republicans, was gaining strength in the run up to the passage of the 18th Amendment. Additionally, a Socialist Party popular with Scandinavian immigrants had sprung up on the Iron Range under the name of the Public Ownership Party.

Not only were Republicans contending with a newly strong Democratic Party and insurgent third parties, but also with a significant rebellion from their own voters. Just as such a rift had festered in the presidential election, the divide between progressive Republicans and reactionary Republicans grew to a fever pitch in Minnesota. Progressive Republicans held that reactionary Republicans (like Governor Eberhart) had been using their political machine to hold up popular reforms of the day, like referendums, recall elections, and railroad regulations.

All these factors were amplified by the fact that this was Minnesota's first ever statewide primary in 1912.

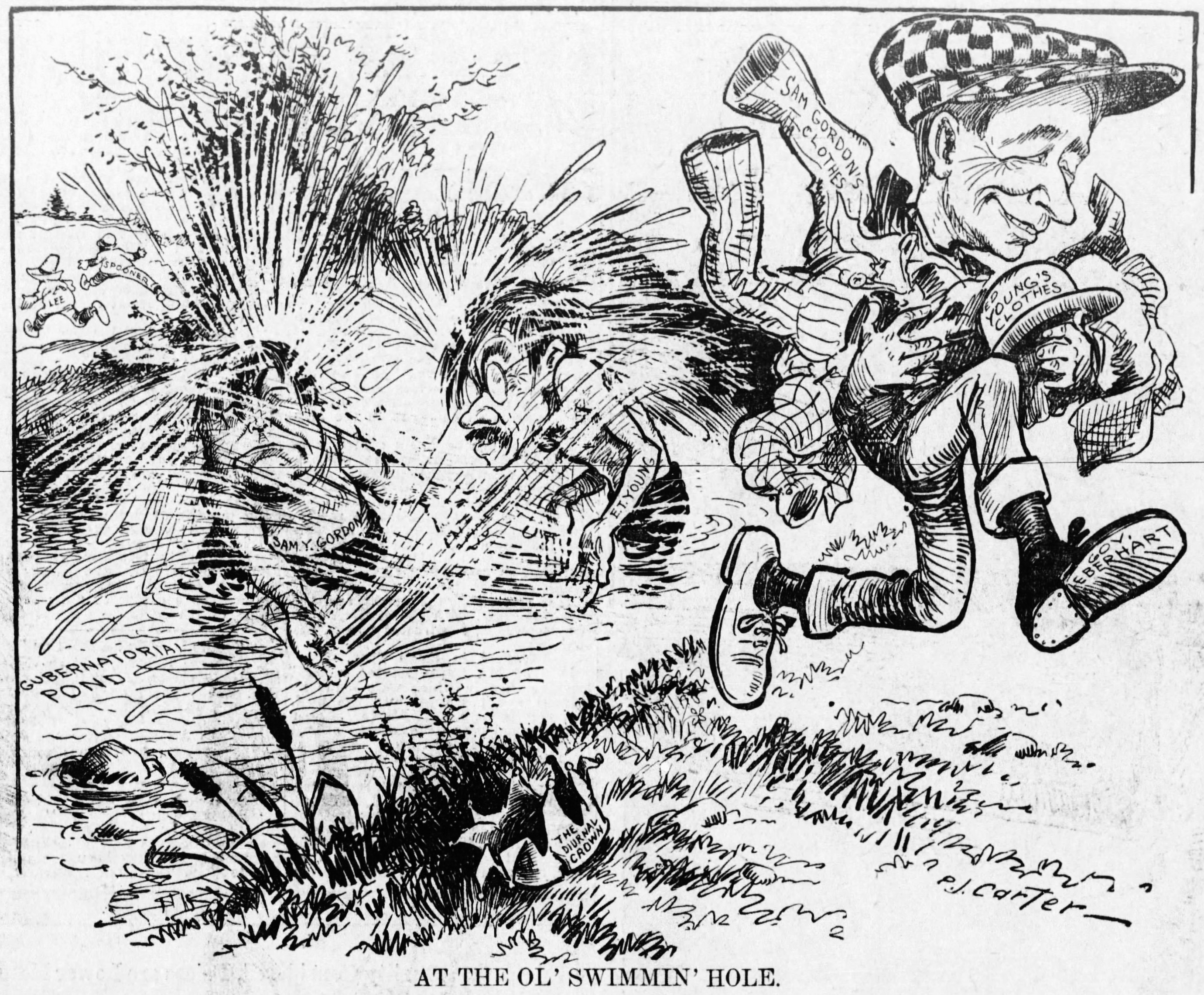
Cartoon published in the Minneapolis Tribune on July 28, depicting Governor Eberhart running off with Gordon and Young's clothes

=== Campaign ===
Early in 1912, it was speculated that incumbent Senator Knute Nelson would not be running for a third term under a new Minnesota law that provided for the direct election of United States Senators. Governor Eberhart reportedly dashed his plans of running for reelection and was planning on running for Nelson's seat. Days later, however, Eberhart announced his plans to run for reelection on January 12 after Nelson announced his run for the Senate.

Three days later, former Speaker of the Minnesota House William E. Lee and Lieutenant Governor Sam Y. Gordon threw their hats in the ring. At an event in Browns Valley, Gordon characterized his run for governor "as a challenge of the right of... [business] interests to dominate public affairs, and to dictate party policies."

In early February, Lewis C. Spooner, a more traditional Republican, was reportedly encouraging Edwin H. Canfield, a former state senator from Luverne, to run for governor and take votes from Eberhart. Canfield declined, which forced Spooner into the race by April.

Starting in May, non-binding Republican county conventions showed deep distaste for the incumbent governor. At the first convention in Kandiyohi County, Eberhart did not carry a single precinct.

After the passage of the bill calling for Minnesota's first statewide primary, Edward Young, of Appleton, announced his candidacy for the governorship in late June. In early July, a political newcomer by the name of Martin Falk jumped into the race. He was considered so obscure that the Duluth Herald remarked that he would "very likely never be Governor of Minnesota."

By late July, a rift had formed between the serious candidates. After the contentious 1912 Republican National Convention, Gordon announced that he would not support William Howard Taft's candidacy and would support Teddy Roosevelt's bid instead. Eberhart and Spooner vowed to support the party's choice of Taft. This, coupled with the announcement that the primary would be ranked-choice, inspired Eberhart's campaign to publish a paper denouncing Lee, Gordon, and Young, but leaving critiques of Spooner out, thus offering Spooner a tacit endorsement for second choice. Later, Young announced that he would support Democrat Woodrow Wilson in the presidential election.

The 1912 harvest season was especially strong in Minnesota, which left farmers too busy to attend political rallies. The candidates all abandoned their speaking tours for weeks during August as no one could rally enough support to fill a hall. One farmer remarked "My wheat means more to me than who is going to be elected."

In late August, as the primary date approached, progressive Republicans worried that their candidates were splitting the anti-Eberhart vote. They had hoped the second-choice provision on ballots would save them, but voters were increasingly skeptical of the option. Notably, Gordon's campaign manager quit and Gordon nearly dropped out.

The final days of the campaign were marked with controversy over the second-choice provision and endorsements from various groups and politicians. The Duluth Herald proclaimed the coming primary to be the "Last Stand of [the] Republican Machine."

=== Candidates ===
==== Nominated ====
- Adolph Olson Eberhart, incumbent governor of Minnesota, former lieutenant governor and state senator

==== Eliminated in primary ====
- Martin F. Falk
- Samuel Y. Gordon, incumbent lieutenant governor
- William E. Lee, former speaker of the Minnesota House of Representatives
- Lewis C. Spooner, state representative
- Edward T. Young, former Minnesota attorney general, state senator, state representative, Appleton city attorney, and Appleton city councilor

==== Withdrawn ====
- Edgar Weaver, county auditor of Blue Earth County

==== Declined ====
- Ripley B. Brower, former state senator
- Edwin H. Canfield, former state senator
- Robert C. Dunn, state representative, former Republican gubernatorial nominee, former state auditor, former county attorney of Mille Lacs County
- Samuel G. Iverson, state auditor
- Samuel Lord, member of Minnesota Board of Taxation

=== Endorsements ===
Adolph O. Eberhart (GOP)

Mayors

- Herbert P. Keller, mayor of St. Paul

City Officials

- Robert Stratton, city attorney of Hibbing

Party organizations

- Douglas County Republicans
William Lee (GOP)

U.S. senators

- Miles Poindexter of Washington

National organizations

- Anti-Saloon League

Party organizations

- Minnesota Republican Progressive League
Edward Young (GOP)

State elected officials

- George T. Simpson, former Minnesota attorney general

=== Results ===
Results by county: Eberhart: 20–30%; 30–40%; 40–50%; 50–60%; 60–70%; Lee: 30–40%; 40–50%; 60–70%; Young: 30–40%; 40–50%; 50–60%; Spooner: 20–30%; 50–60%; Gordon: 50–60%; Tie: 30–40%

For this primary, the Minnesota Republican Party used a ranked-choice system. In its implementation, the system was mistrusted by voters who believed their first choices would be ignored for their second choices by party operatives. As a result, less than 10% of voters indicated a second choice. Only second choices were allowed.

The primary was held on September 17.

Runoff round tabulation
Candidate	Round 1		Round 2			Round 3			Round 4			Round 5		
Candidate	votes (% of active)		transfer	votes (% of active)		transfer	votes (% of active)		transfer	votes (% of active)		transfer	votes (% of active)	
Adolph Olson Eberhart	62,402	38.0%	+671	63,073	39.6%	+555	63,628	42.2%	+769	64,397	45.8%	+2,160	66,557	57.5%
William E. Lee	40,571	24.7%	+363	40,934	25.7%	+1,699	42,633	28.2%	+983	43,616	31.0%	+5,497	49,113	42.5%
Edward T. Young	30,398	18.5%	+260	30,658	19.3%	+1,138	31,796	21.1%	+878	32,674	23.2%	-32,674		
Lewis C. Spooner	12,233	7.5%	+178	12,411	7.8%	+449	12,860	8.5%	-12,860					
Sam Y. Gordon	11,927	7.3%	+221	12,148	7.6%	-12,148								
Martin F. Falk	6,536	4.0%	-6,536											
Active ballots (% of Valid)	164,067	100%		159,224	97.0%		150,917	92.0%		140,687	85.7%		115,670	70.5%
Exhausted ballots (% of Valid)	0	0.0%	+4,843	4,843	3.0%	+8,307	13,150	8.0%	+10,230	23,380	14.3%	+25,017	48,397	29.5%

== Democratic primary ==
=== Background ===
Minnesota had been a Republican stronghold for decades, but it appeared that this dominance was waning. The Republicans, divided between their reactionary and progressive factions, were more concerned with fighting among themselves than fighting the historically weak Minnesota Democratic Party. Having built something of a bench in the state, Minnesota Democrats were optimistic for 1912, as were outside observers. The Duluth Herald remarked that "there was never a time in Minnesota when the Democratic outlook was so bright."

=== Campaign ===
Peter M. Ringdal was first mentioned for the governorship early in 1912, along with other Minnesota Democrats. He was known as a "true progressive" and one of the leaders of the progressive movement in Minnesota. One paper remarked that Ringdal was the Nestor of Minnesota progressives.

In March, prominent members of the Minnesota Democratic Party met to discuss the coming party convention and primary. They believed Woodrow Wilson would receive the state's Democratic delegates. They also expressed confidence that then-Congressman Winfield Scott Hammond would be a good candidate for governor, though they would settle for Ringdal as a second choice.

In April, the Minneapolis Democratic Party endorsed Charles M. Andrist, a French language professor at the University of Minnesota. He had not yet decided to run for governor, so the endorsement came as a surprise. On May 23, Andrist officially entered the race and unveiled his platform at a banquet in Minneapolis. His platform included some favorite progressive reforms of the day, like the popular election of senators, campaign finance reforms, and allowing high schools to teach agricultural studies.

In late July, both Ringdal and Andrist officially paid the $50 filing fee. The Democratic organization in Minnesota asked Andrist to withdraw and support Ringdal to boost their chances of winning in the general election. This was part of a theme that year: the Democratic organization, sensing a weakly united Republican organization, was seeking to forward their strongest ticket without any primary challenges. However, their attempt to crowd out Andrist seems to have emboldened another professor, who told many that he had decided to run for governor: Peter M. Magnusson of St. Cloud. He never officially filed, however, and did not appear on primary ballots.

Representative government without direct popular control of its politics is a relic of an age that is gone.

— Peter M. Ringdal, The Duluth Herald

As the campaign got underway, Ringdal positioned himself as a progressive Democrat. His platform supported popular reforms such as initiative and referendum, workmen's compensation, and a progressive tax structure. Though Andrist, Ringdal's only competitor, was understood to be a man of "high character," he remained an unknown entity whose platform was not well-known and who was without a particularly organized campaign.

Ringdal was joined by progressive Republican James Peterson to speak at the Labor Day festivities in Duluth. He spoke at length in support of unions and of breaking up trusts.

In the final weeks of the campaign, observers accused Ringdal of being the candidate of the "Democrat machine," just as they had accused Governor Eberhart of being a product of the Republican "machine." It was noted that Ringdal campaigned little compared to Andrist, and was seemingly expecting the nomination without having to campaign.

In the final days of the campaign, many local newspapers remarked that Ringdal was the heavy favorite.

=== Endorsements ===
Peter M. Ringdal (Dem)

Newspapers

- Freeborn County Standard

=== Candidates ===
==== Nominated ====
- Peter M. Ringdal, chairman of the State Board of Control, former state senator

==== Eliminated in primary ====
- Charles M. Andrist, professor at the University of Minnesota

==== Withdrawn ====
- Peter M. Magnusson, professor, 1906 Democratic nominee for secretary of state

==== Declined ====
- Samuel G. Anderson, former state representative
- James G. Armson
- Thomas E. Cashman, state senator
- J. B. Galarneault, banker
- Winfield Scott Hammond, U.S. representative from Minnesota's second congressional district
- John Jenswold, lawyer (ran for Congress)
- Peter M. Kerst, former state bank examiner
- T. J. Knox, former state railroad and warehouse commissioner
- William E. McEwen, former state labor commissioner
- E. P. Peterson, state senator
- Albert Pfaender, state representative
- C. W. Stanton, judge

=== Results ===
Results by county: Ringdal: 50–60%; 60–70%; 70–80%; 80–90%; 90–100%; Andrist: 50–60%; 60–70%; 80–90%

The Democrats did not run a ranked-choice primary.

Minnesota Democratic gubernatorial primary results
Party	Candidate	Votes	%
Democratic	Peter M. Ringdal	19,871	63.21%
Democratic	Charles M. Andrist	11,567	36.79%
Total votes		31,438	100%

== Candidates ==
- Paul V. Collins, publisher and editor of the Northwestern Agriculturalist (Progressive)
- Adolph Olson Eberhart, incumbent (Republican)
- Engebret E. Lobeck, former state representative (Prohibition)
- David Morgan, minister (Public Ownership)
- Peter M. Ringdal, former state senator (Democrat)

== Results ==
1912 gubernatorial election, Minnesota
Party	Candidate	Votes	%	±%
Republican	Adolph Olson Eberhart (incumbent)	129,688	40.73%	−15.01%
Democratic	Peter M. Ringdal	99,659	31.30%	−3.93%
Progressive	Paul V. Collins	33,455	10.51%	n/a
Prohibition	Engebret E. Lobeck	29,876	9.38%	+6.34%
Public Ownership	David Morgan	25,769	8.09%	+4.30%
Majority		30,029	9.43%	
Turnout		318,447		
Republican hold		Swing		

== See also ==
- List of Minnesota gubernatorial elections
