= George H. Sullivan =

American politician

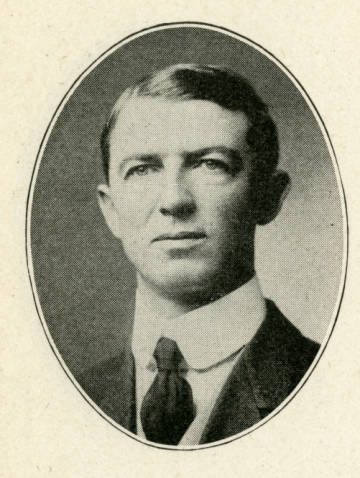
- Portrait of George Henry Sullivan, 1917

21st Lieutenant Governor of Minnesota
- In office October 28, 1916 – January 2, 1917
- Governor: Joseph A. A. Burnquist
- Preceded by: Joseph A. A. Burnquist
- Succeeded by: Thomas Frankson

Member of the Minnesota Senate from the 43rd district 31st (1907-1914)
- In office 1907–1935
- Preceded by: Edward White Durant
- Succeeded by: Karl G. Neumeier

Personal details
- Born: December 20, 1867 Stillwater, Minnesota, U.S.
- Died: February 15, 1935 (aged 67) Mahtomedi, Minnesota, U.S.
- Party: Republican
- Spouse: Kittie E. Brand
- Education: University of Wisconsin
- Profession: Lawyer

George Henry Sullivan (December 20, 1867 – February 15, 1935) was a Minnesota state senator and the 21st lieutenant governor of Minnesota. As the president pro tempore of the Minnesota state senate, he became lieutenant governor when Joseph A. A. Burnquist was elevated to governor upon the death of Winfield Scott Hammond. He served as lieutenant governor from October 28, 1916, to January 2, 1917.

He died in office in 1935 in Mahtomedi, Minnesota.

== Career ==
Sullivan served as the county attorney for Washington County, Minnesota starting in 1891 and was appointed municipal attorney of Stillwater, Minnesota in 1901, serving until 1907.

He was first elected to the Minnesota senate seat representing the 31st district in 1907, representing Washington County. He served the same county for the remainder of his life after redistricting changed it to district 43.

In 1915, Sullivan was elected president pro tempore. In December of year, governor Winfield Scott Hammond died. The lieutenant governor and president of the senate, Joseph A. A. Burnquist, was elevated to the position of governor, and Sullivan was elevated to Burnquist's position. Sullivan was not on the ballot for the 1916 Minnesota lieutenant gubernatorial election, and continued serving as senator after Thomas Frankson won that election.

=== The Wilcox-Sullivan Contest ===
Sullivan lost the 1918 senatorial election against W. W. Wilcox by a margin of 43 votes. Sullivan requested a recount, which found that Wilcox had won by 35 votes. However, Wilcox's campaign literature was found within 50 feet of a voting booth on election day, in violation of the state's fair campaign practices act. Wilcox's seat was declared vacant after only 26 days in office and a special election was held, which Sullivan won.

Political offices
Preceded by Joseph A. A. Burnquist	Lieutenant Governor of Minnesota; 1916–1917	Succeeded by Thomas Frankson
