= Burnquist =

Burnquist is a surname. Notable people with the surname include:

- Bob Burnquist (born 1976), Brazilian-American skateboarder
- Joseph A. A. Burnquist (1879–1961), American attorney and politician

== See also ==
- Burnquist House, a historic house in St. Paul, Minnesota, United States
