= 1914 Minnesota gubernatorial election =

- November 3, 1914
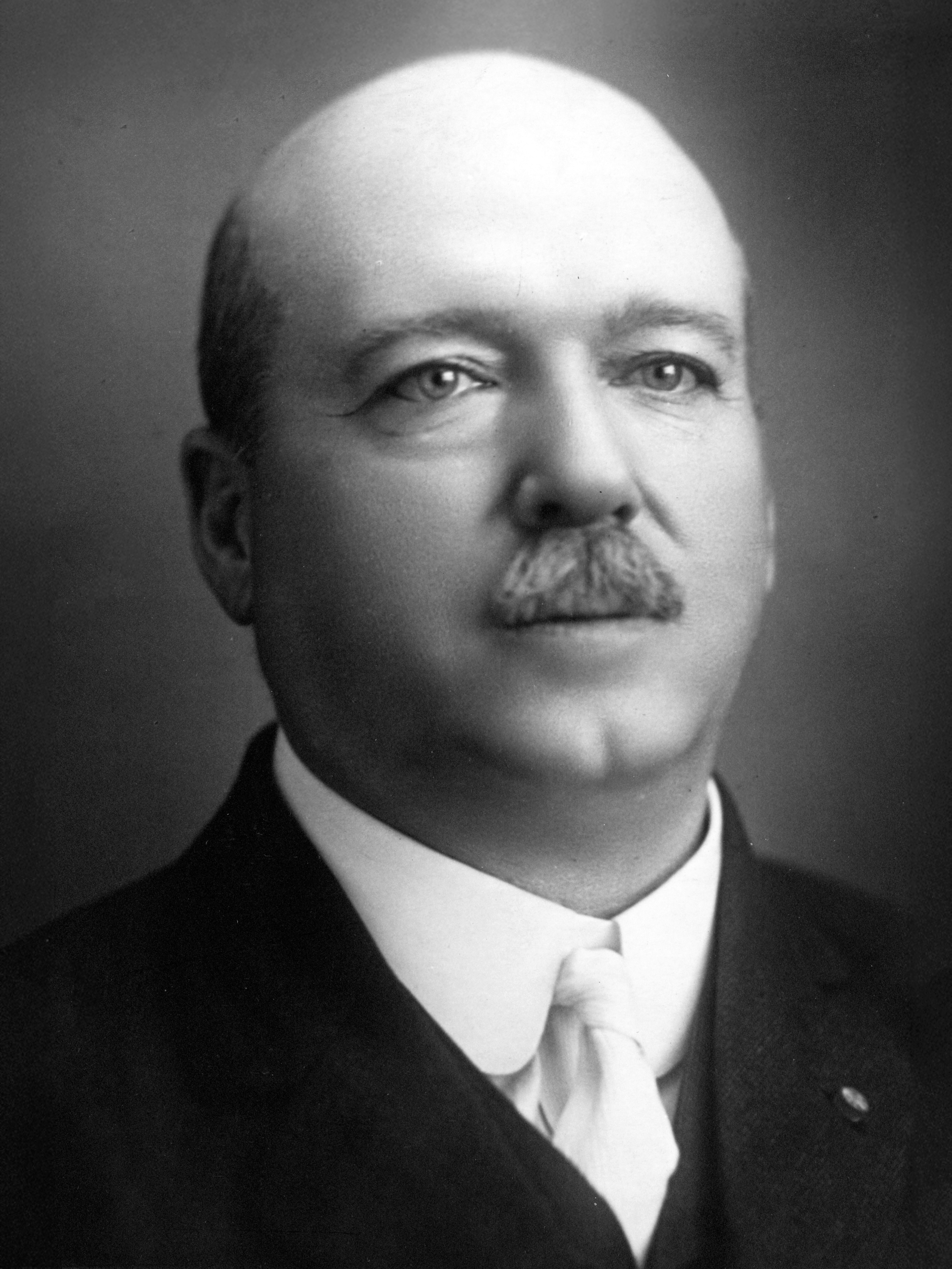

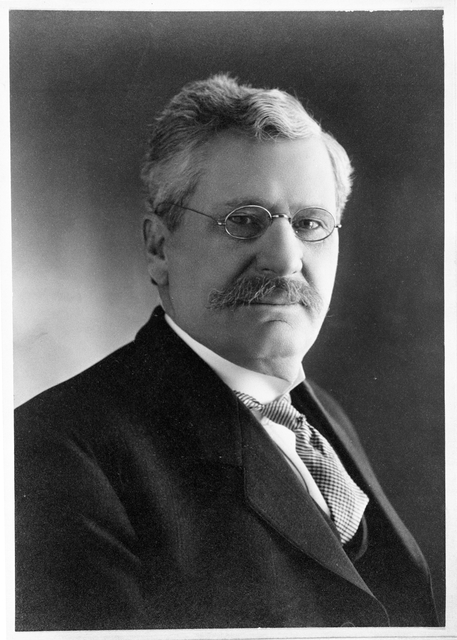

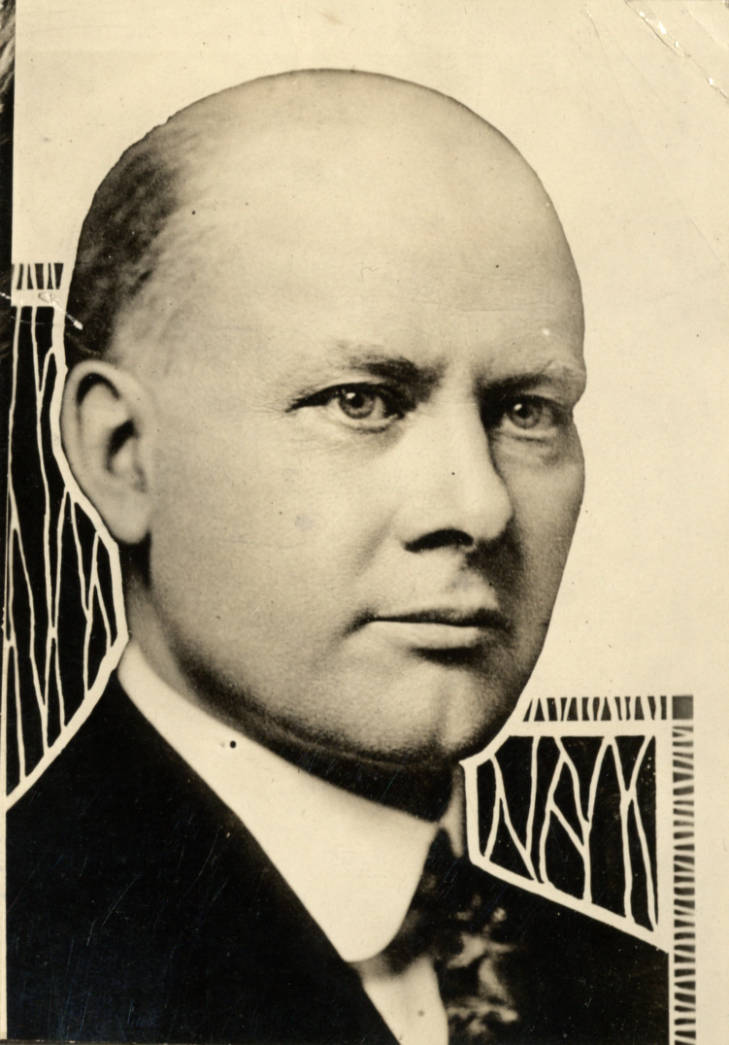

Nominee	Winfield S. Hammond	William E. Lee
Party	Democratic	Republican
Popular vote	156,304	143,730
Percentage	45.54%	41.87%
Nominee	Willis G. Calderwood	Thomas J. Lewis
Party	Prohibition	Socialist
Popular vote	18,582	17,225
Percentage	5.41%	5.02%
- County results Hammond: 30–40% 40–50% 50–60% 60–70% Lee: 30–40% 40–50% 50–60% Lewis: 30–40%
Governor before election
Adolph Olson Eberhart
Republican
Elected Governor
Winfield Scott Hammond
Democratic

The 1914 Minnesota gubernatorial election took place on November 3, 1914. Democratic Party of Minnesota candidate Winfield Scott Hammond defeated Republican Party of Minnesota challenger William E. Lee. Hammond would be the last governor from the Minnesota Democratic Party. The next party to defeat the Republicans would be the Farmer-Labor Party, and decades after that, the DFL.

== Republican primary ==
Incumbent Governor Eberhart faced primary challenger William E. Lee, who had previously run twice before, including a failed attempt to primary Eberhart in 1912. Lee attacked Eberhart on the organization of the State Fish and Game Commission, as it had more game wardens in cities than in rural areas. Eberhart also vetoed a financial appropriations bill Lee supported.

The Republican primary was held on June 16, 1914.

=== Candidates ===
==== Nominated ====
- William E. Lee, former speaker of the Minnesota House of Representatives

==== Eliminated in primary ====
- Adolph Olson Eberhart, incumbent governor of Minnesota, former lieutenant governor and state senator
- Elwood L. Raab, mining engineer

=== Results ===
Results by county: Lee: 40–50%; 50–60%; 60–70%; 70–80%; Eberhart: 40–50%; 50–60%; 60–70%

Republicans conducted a ranked-choice primary, though second choices were not used, as Lee received over 50% in the first round. The campaigns of both Lee and Eberhart announced their victory initially; however, Lee took the lead.

Republican Party of Minnesota primary results
Party	Candidate	Votes	%
Republican	William E. Lee	102,757	52.64%
Republican	Adolph Olson Eberhart (incumbent)	86,340	44.23%
Republican	Elwood L. Raab	6,105	3.13%
Total votes		195,202	100%

== Democratic primary ==
Hammond was first named by Democratic National Committee member Fred B. Lynch as a potential candidate in February of 1914. Hammond was in Washington, D.C. for the entire duration of the convention, so was at no point physically present.

Lawler had previously run for governor multiple times, only winning the nomination during his first attempt in 1892. Being one of the most conservative Minnesota Democrats, he was not very popular within his own party, even being formally denounced by them in 1898. Despite this, Lawler performed surprisingly well, overperforming massively.

=== Candidates ===
==== Nominated ====
- Winfield Scott Hammond, U.S. representative

==== Eliminated in primary ====
- Daniel W. Lawler, former mayor of St. Paul

=== Results ===
Results by county: Hammond: 50–60%; 60–70%; 70–80%; 80–90%; 90–100%; Lawler: 50–60%; 60–70%; 70–80%

Minnesota Democratic gubernatorial primary results
Party	Candidate	Votes	%
Democratic	Winfield Scott Hammond	21,852	51.09%
Democratic	Daniel W. Lawler	20,923	48.91%
Total votes		42,775	100%

== Candidates ==
- Willis G. Calderwood, founder and treasurer of the Ministers Life and Casualty Union (Prohibition)
- Hugh T. Halbery, attorney (Progressive)
- Winfield S. Hammond, member of the United States House of Representatives
- Herbert Johnson, machinist (Industrial Labor)
- William E. Lee, former speaker of the Minnesota House of Representatives
- Thomas J. Lewis, organizer (Socialist)

== Campaigns ==
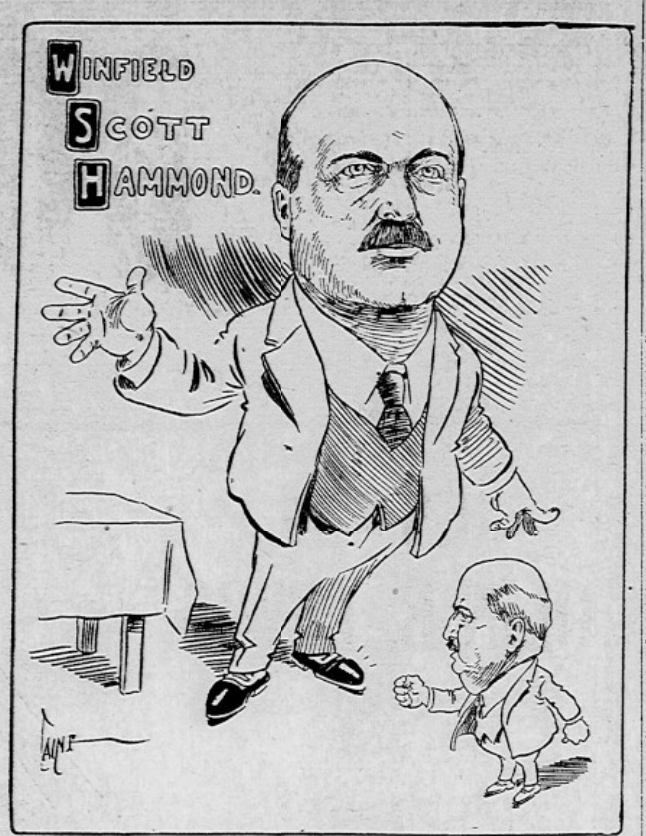
Winfield Scott Hammond political cartoon

Following his loss in the Republican primary, Eberhart refused to work with Lee's campaign. He stated that he would still vote for Lee.

Following his nomination, Hammond returned to Minnesota on August 1, 1914, to begin campaigning.

Lee, who had previously accused members of his own party of corruption while running against Eberhart, declared that all whom he had accused of corruption had "changed their views". Former Minnesota Secretary of State Albert Berg, a Republican, called Lee a "Party-Wrecker" and said he would support Hammond out of protest.

Socialist Party candidate Thomas J. Lewis gave a speech in which he called American workers cowardly for not continuing to demand more rights and better conditions.

Prohibition Party candidate Willis G. Calderwood was expected to perform well. He focused mostly on campaigning in what would otherwise be safe Republican territory. In early October, Lee attempted to convince the Prohibition party to withdraw their nomination of Calderwood and instead endorse him. The deal was not accepted.

Both Lee and Hammond were Prohibitionists, and Lee accused Hammond of being pro-liquor, an attack Hammond responded to by declaring in a speech in Mankato, "I am a temperance man". Hammond then attacked Lee by bringing to attention that Lee had not been present during a previous vote in the state legislature on alcohol, accusing him of dodging the issue intentionally.

Hammond received multiple endorsements, published on November 1. These included endorsements from President Woodrow Wilson, former Governor John Lind, and Secretary of State William Jennings Bryan.

== Results ==
1914 gubernatorial election, Minnesota
Party	Candidate	Votes	%	±%
Democratic	Winfield Scott Hammond	156,304	45.54%	+14.24%
Republican	William E. Lee	143,730	41.87%	+1.15%
Prohibition	Willis G. Calderwood	18,582	5.41%	−3.97%
Socialist	Thomas J. Lewis	17,225	5.02%	−3.07%
Industrial Labor	Herbert Johnson	3,861	1.12%	n/a
Progressive	Hugh T. Halbert	3,553	1.04%	−9.47%
Majority		12,574	3.66%	
Turnout		343,255		
Democratic gain from Republican		Swing		

== See also ==
- List of Minnesota gubernatorial elections
