= Peter M. Ringdal =

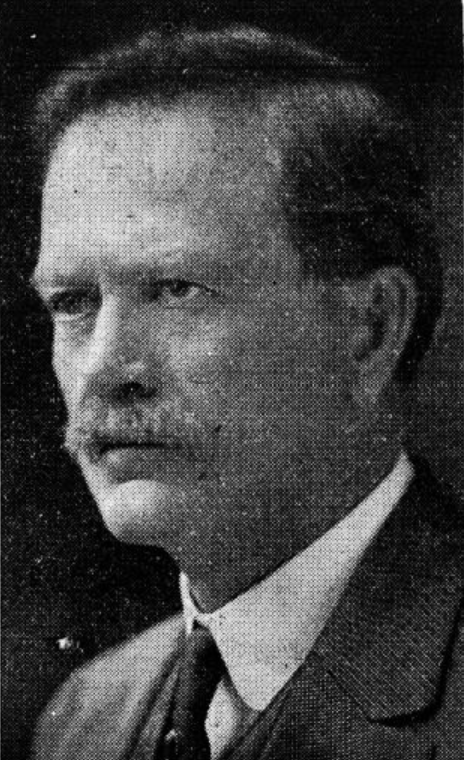
- Born: February 10, 1861; Goodhue County
- Died: October 9, 1934 (aged 73)
- Political party: Democrat
- Other political affiliations: Populist

Peter M. Ringdal (February 10, 1861 – October 9, 1934) was an American politician from the state of Minnesota.

Ringdahl was born in Goodhue County, in 1861. In 1888, he moved to Crookston, Minnesota. By trade, he became a Marble dealer. In 1894, he was elected to be a State Senator representing district 51. He served in the State Senate until 1898. He was then a member of the State Board of Control from 1907 until 1913.

Peter M. Ringdal was first mentioned for the governorship early in 1912, along with other Minnesota Democrats. He was known as a "true progressive" and one of the leaders of the progressive movement in Minnesota. One paper remarked that Ringdal was the Nestor of Minnesota progressives. He swept the Democratic primary with 63.21%, however failed to win the election. Progressive Party candidate Paul V. Collins and Public Ownership candidate David Morgan split the progressive and left-wing vote, letting Republican candidate Adolph Olson Eberhart win the election.
