= 1916 Minnesota gubernatorial election =

- November 7, 1916
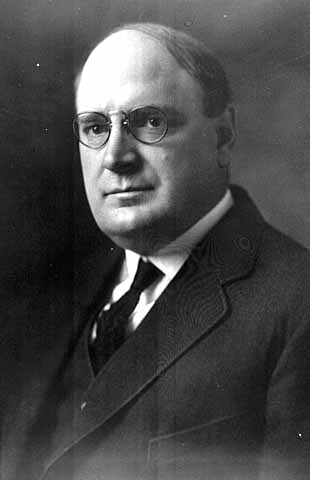

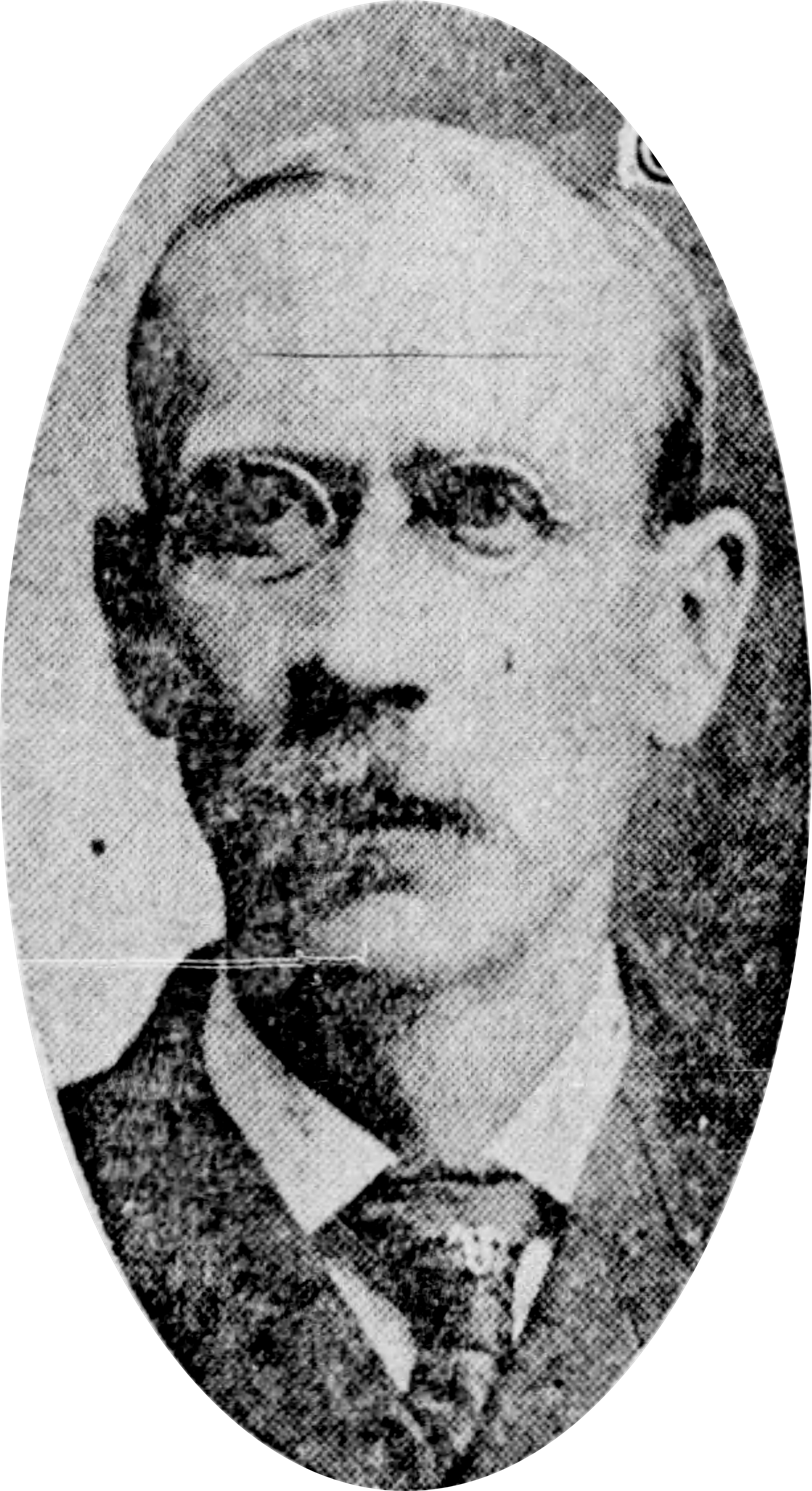

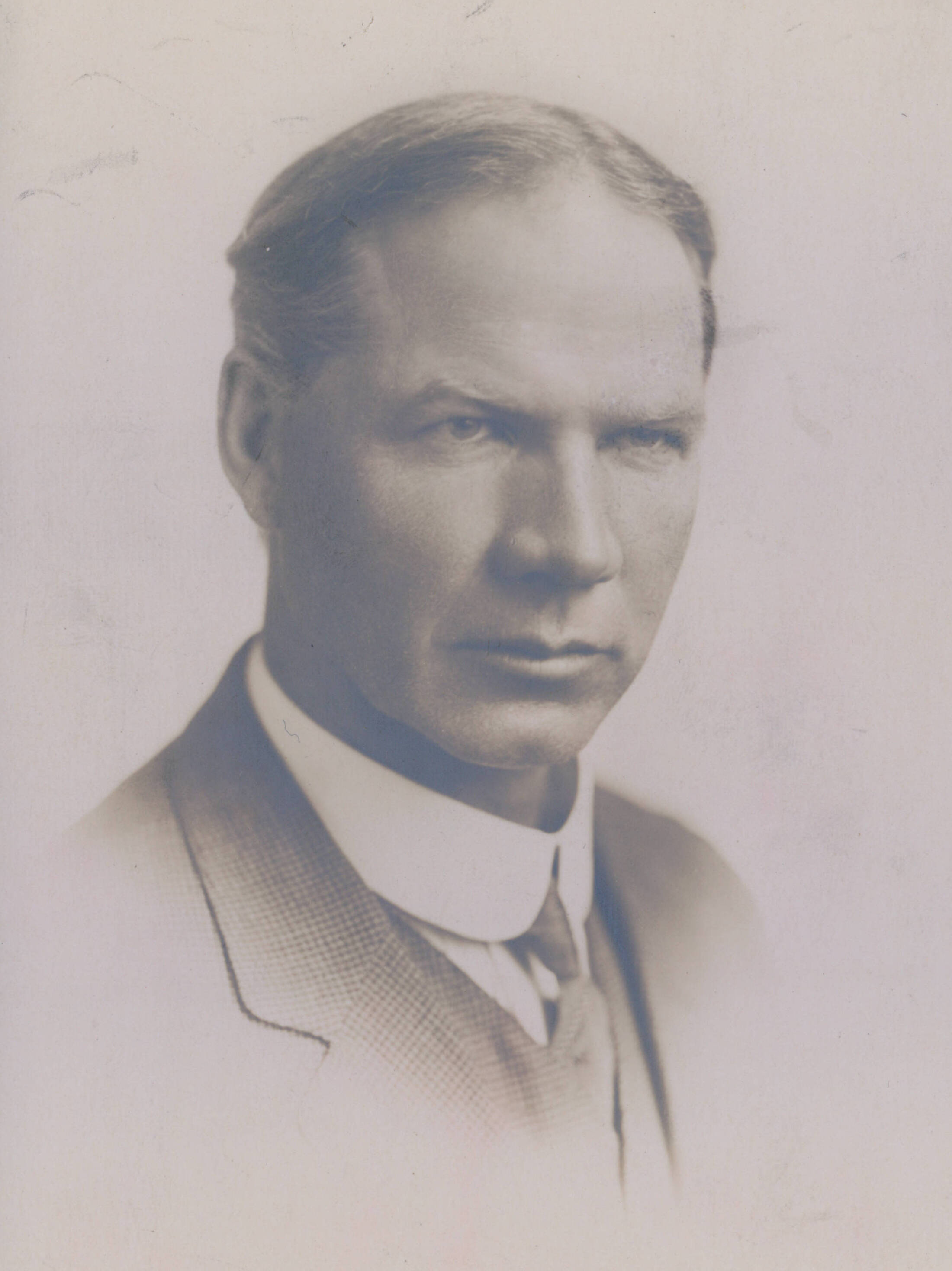
Nominee	J. A. A. Burnquist	Thomas P. Dwyer
Party	Republican	Democratic
Popular vote	245,841	93,112
Percentage	62.94%	23.84%
Nominee	J. O. Bentall	Thomas J. Anderson
Party	Socialist	Prohibition
Popular vote	26,306	19,884
Percentage	6.73%	5.09%
- County results Burnquist: 40–50% 50–60% 60–70% 70–80% 80–90%
Governor before election
J. A. A. Burnquist
Republican
Elected Governor
J. A. A. Burnquist
Republican

The 1916 Minnesota gubernatorial election took place on November 7, 1916. Republican Party of Minnesota candidate J. A. A. Burnquist defeated Democratic Party of Minnesota challenger Thomas P. Dwyer.

== Background ==
In 1914, Democratic candidate Winfield Scott Hammond was victorious. In December of 1915, Hammond would die in office. Lieutenant Governor Joseph A.A. Burnquist, a Republican, became governor. As of the 1916 election, he had been in office for less than a year. The Democrats lacked a strong candidate following Hammond's death.

== Republican primary ==
Iverson, who had served as State Auditor for twelve years, challenged incumbent Burnquist, believing him to lack the appropriate experience to be an effective governor.

The primary election was held on June 19, 1916.

=== Candidates ===
==== Nominated ====
- Joseph. A. A. Burnquist, incumbent governor, former lieutenant governor, former state representative

==== Eliminated in primary ====
- Samuel G. Iverson, former state auditor, former state representative

=== Results ===
Results by county: Burnquist: 50–60%; 60–70%; 70–80%; 80–90%; 90–100%

Republican Party of Minnesota primary results
Party	Candidate	Votes	%
Republican	Joseph A. A. Burnquist (incumbent)	136,122	76.01%
Republican	Samuel G. Iverson	42,955	23.99%
Total votes		179,077	100%

== Democratic primary ==
On June 29, 1916, the official beginning of the primary was postponed until July 13, 1916. Despite this, frontrunner Thomas P. Dwyer decided to begin his campaign early, before being formally nominated. Dwyer would win the nomination.

=== Candidates ===
==== Nominated ====
- Thomas P. Dwyer, boilermaker

==== Eliminated in primary ====
- Cyrus M. King, chairman of Itasca County Board of Commissioners
- Sam D. Works, state insurance commissioner

=== Results ===
Results by county: Dwyer: 30–40%; 40–50%; 50–60%; King: 30–40%; 40–50%; 50–60%; 80–90%; Works: 30–40%; 40–50%; 60–70%; Tie: 30–40%

Minnesota Democratic gubernatorial primary results
Party	Candidate	Votes	%
Democratic	Thomas P. Dwyer	15,290	39.73%
Democratic	Cyrus M. King	11,994	31.17%
Democratic	S. D. Works	11,994	29.10%
Total votes		38,480	100%

== Candidates ==
- J.O. Bentall, former state Secretary of the Illinois Socialist Party (Socialist)
- John P. Johnson, Chiropractor (Industrial Labor)
- Joseph. A. A. Burnquist, Incumbent (Republican)
- Thomas J. Anderson, Grocery Store owner (Prohibition)
- Thomas P. Dwyer, Boilermaker (Democrat)

== Campaigns ==
Following his nomination, opposition to him from within the party grew, with runner-up Cyrus M. King even attempting to organize an 'Independent Democracy' ticket. Party leaders decided to allow Dwyer to continue his run simply because they did not have a budget capable of fielding another candidate. Dwyer continued to sow division by campaigning against prohibition, while the candidate for lieutenant governor, Julius Thorson, campaigned as a prohibitionist. Dwyer's nomination was called "a good joke" by the St. Paul Pioneer Press.

Dwyer's campaign suffered due to both factions of his party becoming dissatisfied with him, and most effort being put towards Woodrow Wilson's re-election campaign.

Burnquist did not even launch his re-election campaign until October 21, 1916.

Dwyer campaigned on raising the minimum wage to $0.25 an hour, and freeing imprisoned iron worker strikers held in the Stillwater prison.

== Results ==
1916 gubernatorial election, Minnesota
Party	Candidate	Votes	%	±%
Republican	J. A. A. Burnquist (incumbent)	245,841	62.94%	+21.06%
Democratic	Thomas P. Dwyer	93,112	23.84%	−21.70%
Socialist	J. O. Bentall	26,306	6.73%	+1.72%
Prohibition	Thomas J. Anderson	19,884	5.09%	−0.32%
Industrial Labor	John P. Johnson	5,476	1.40%	+0.28%
Majority		152,729	39.10%	
Turnout		390,619		
Republican hold		Swing		

== See also ==
- List of Minnesota gubernatorial elections
