= 1910 Minnesota lieutenant gubernatorial election =

Minnesota lieutenant gubernatorial election, 1910
- November 8, 1910
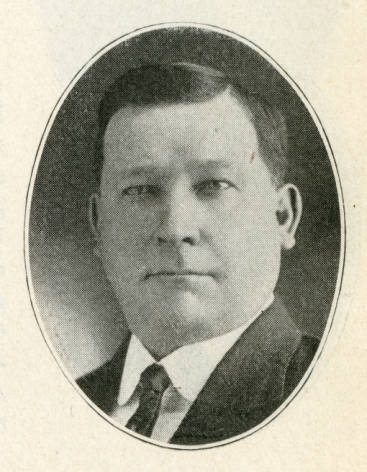

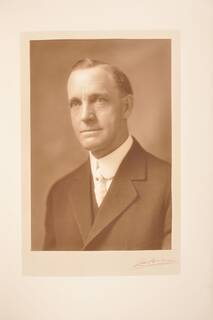

Nominee	Samuel Y. Gordon	Merrill C. Tifft
Party	Republican	Democratic
Popular vote	155,994	86,503
Percentage	56.39%	31.27%
Nominee	Lewis M. Ayer	J. D. Engle
Party	Public Ownership	Prohibition
Popular vote	18,363	15,788
Percentage	6.64%	5.71%
Lieutenant Governor before election
Edward Everett Smith
Republican
Elected Lieutenant Governor
Samuel Y. Gordon
Republican

The 1910 Minnesota lieutenant gubernatorial election took place on November 8, 1910. Republican Party of Minnesota candidate Samuel Y. Gordon defeated Minnesota Democratic Party challenger Merrill C. Tifft, Public Ownership Party candidate Lewis M. Ayer, and Prohibition Party candidate J. D. Engle.

== Results ==
1910 lieutenant gubernatorial election, Minnesota
Party	Candidate	Votes	%	±%
Republican	Samuel Y. Gordon	155,994	56.39%	+0.71%
Democratic	Merrill C. Tifft	86,503	31.27%	−5.54%
Public Ownership	Lewis M. Ayer	18,363	6.64%	n/a
Prohibition	J. D. Engle	15,788	5.71%	−0.81%
Majority		69,491	25.12%	
Turnout		276,648		
Republican hold		Swing		
