= 1906 Minnesota lieutenant gubernatorial election =

Minnesota lieutenant gubernatorial election, 1906
- November 6, 1906
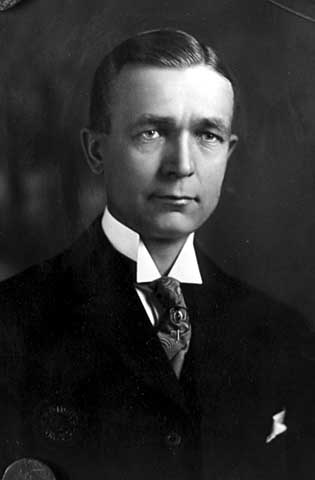

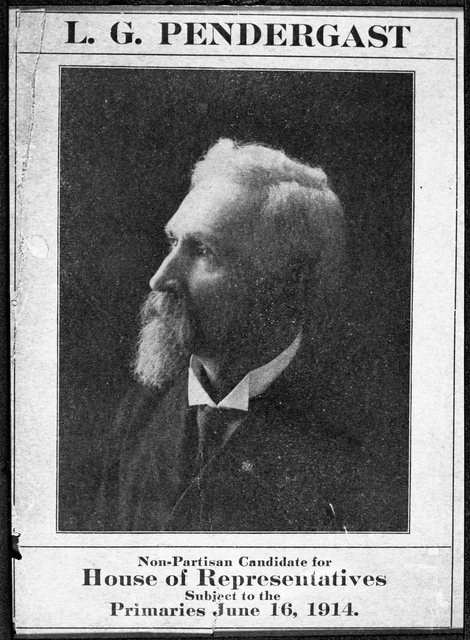

Nominee	A. O. Eberhart	Lloyd G. Pendergast	Ole Lokensgaard
Party	Republican	Democratic	Prohibition
Popular vote	137,864	106,926	15,900
Percentage	52.88%	41.02%	6.10%
Lieutenant Governor before election
Ray W. Jones
Republican
Elected Lieutenant Governor
A. O. Eberhart
Republican

The 1906 Minnesota lieutenant gubernatorial election took place on November 6, 1906. Republican Party of Minnesota candidate Adolph Olson Eberhart defeated Minnesota Democratic Party challenger Lloyd G. Pendergast and Prohibition Party candidate Ole Lokensgaard.

== Results ==
1906 lieutenant gubernatorial election, Minnesota
Party	Candidate	Votes	%	±%
Republican	A. O. Eberhart	137,864	52.88%	−1.25%
Democratic	Lloyd G. Pendergast	106,926	41.02%	+1.76%
Prohibition	Ole Lokensgaard	15,900	6.10%	+2.51%
Majority		30,938	11.87%	
Turnout		260,690		
Republican hold		Swing		
