= 1908 Minnesota lieutenant gubernatorial election =

Minnesota lieutenant gubernatorial election, 1908
- November 3, 1908
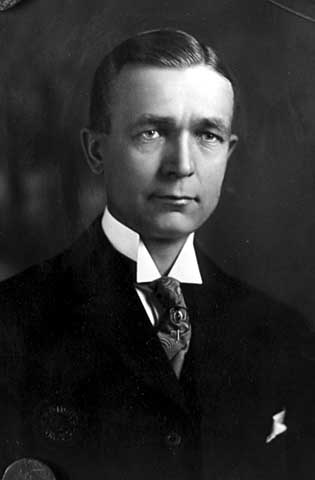

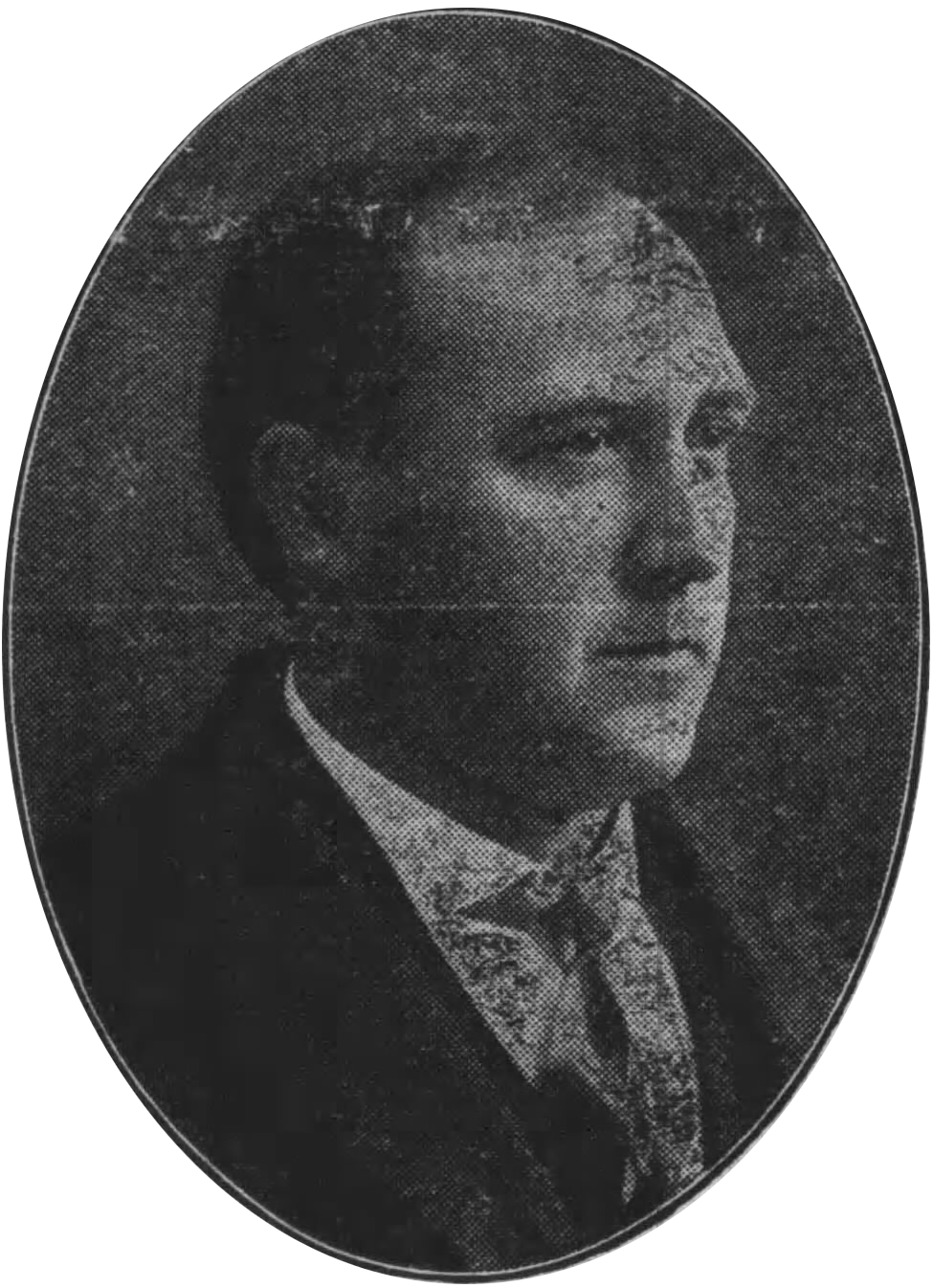

Nominee	A. O. Eberhart	Julius Reiter	T. J. Anderson
Party	Republican	Democratic	Prohibition
Popular vote	164,884	109,010	19,317
Percentage	55.68%	36.81%	6.52%
Lieutenant Governor before election
A. O. Eberhart
Republican
Elected Lieutenant Governor
A. O. Eberhart
Republican

The 1908 Minnesota lieutenant gubernatorial election took place on November 3, 1908. Incumbent Lieutenant Governor Adolph Olson Eberhart of the Republican Party of Minnesota defeated Minnesota Democratic Party challenger Julius J. Reiter and Prohibition Party candidate T. J. Anderson.

== Results ==
1908 lieutenant gubernatorial election, Minnesota
Party	Candidate	Votes	%	±%
Republican	A. O. Eberhart (incumbent)	164,884	55.68%	+2.80%
Democratic	J. J. Reiter	109,010	36.81%	−4.21%
Prohibition	T. J. Anderson	19,317	6.52%	+0.42%
Independence	Roscoe Higbee	2,919	0.99%	n/a
Majority		55,874	18.87%	
Turnout		296,130		
Republican hold		Swing		
