= Ezra T. Champlin =

American politician

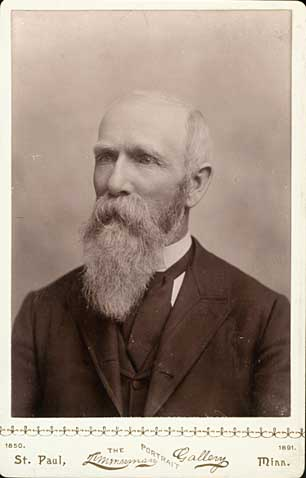
- Champlin c. 1891

20th Speaker of the Minnesota House of Representatives
- In office 1891–1893
- Preceded by: Charles H. Graves
- Succeeded by: William E. Lee

Member of the Minnesota House of Representatives from the 10th district
- In office January 3, 1887 – January 6, 1889; January 5, 1891 – January 1, 1893

Member of the Minnesota House of Representatives from the 14th district
- In office January 5, 1875 – January 3, 1876

Personal details
- Born: April 2, 1839 Ferrisburg, Vermont, U.S.
- Died: February 5, 1928 (aged 88) Vernon Center, Minnesota, U.S.
- Other political affiliations: Farmer's Alliance
- Profession: Farmer, politician

Military service
- Allegiance: United States of America
- Branch/service: Union army
- Years of service: 1861–1865
- Rank: Brevet Captain
- Unit: 3rd Minnesota Infantry Regiment
- Battles/wars: American Civil War; Dakota War of 1862

Ezra Thomas Champlin (April 2, 1839 – February 5, 1928) was a Minnesota politician who served three nonconsecutive terms in the Minnesota House of Representatives and was the twentieth Speaker of the Minnesota House of Representatives. Champlin was the only member of the Farmers' Alliance Party to lead the chamber.

== Early life and education ==
Champlin was born on April 2, 1839 in Ferrisburgh, Vermont, he was the son of Benjamin W. Champlin and Phebe Champlin.^{:360} Champlin was educated in Vermont and worked as a farmer and surveyor.^{:360} Champlin moved to Minnesota Territory in 1860 and settled in Vernon Center, Minnesota.

== Military service ==
During the American Civil War Champlin enlisted in the Union army on October 3, 1861, and was enrolled into the ranks of Company G of the 3rd Minnesota Infantry Regiment.^{:361}^{:152} Champlin was eventually promoted to the rank of Corporal and Sergeant in Company G, before being transferred to Company D where he served as a First Lieutenant.^{:152}

Champlin later served as the aide-de-camp of Christopher Columbus Andrews after refusing a promotion to the rank of Major and command of a United States Colored Troop regiment.^{:361} Champlin was brevetted with the rank of Captain by President of the United States, Andrew Johnson for meritorious service during the Mobile campaign.^{:361}

== Political career ==
Champlin was elected to the Minnesota House of Representatives on November 3, 1874, to represent the 14th House district during the 17th Minnesota Legislature. Champlin was reelected on November 2, 1866, to represent the 10th House district in the 25th Minnesota Legislature. Champlin was elected to his third term on November 4, 1890, to serve in the same district in the 27th Minnesota Legislature. During his third term Champlin was elected as the speaker as part of a political coalition between the Alliance Party and the Minnesota Democratic Party. Champlin was reluctantly supported as speaker by Ignatius L. Donnelly, as well as Minnesota Democrats with Farmer's Alliance leanings.^{:302}

== Later life and death ==
In 1896 Champlin served as the chairman of the Minnesota Democratic State Convention. In 1905 Champlin was commissioned by Governor John Albert Johnson as a member of the Minnesota Board of Equalization.^{:361} Champlin died on February 5, 1928.

== Personal life ==
Champlin was married to Florence Eliza Langdon in Charlotte, Vermont on January 24, 1867, together they had four children.^{:361} Champlin was a Freemason and a member of the Knights of Pythias.^{:361}

Political offices
Preceded by Charles H. Graves	Speaker of the Minnesota House of Representatives; 1891–1892	Succeeded by William E. Lee
