= William E. Lee =

American politician

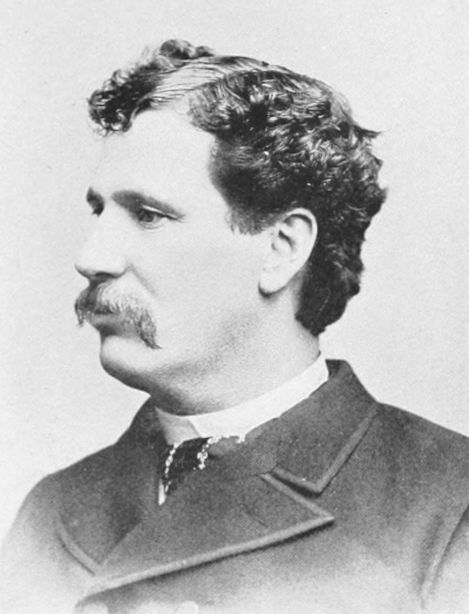
- c. 1897

21st Speaker of the Minnesota House of Representatives
- In office 1893–1895
- Preceded by: Ezra T. Champlin
- Succeeded by: Samuel R. Van Sant

Personal details
- Born: January 8, 1852 Alton, Illinois, U.S.
- Died: November 16, 1920 (aged 68) Long Prairie, Minnesota, U.S.
- Party: Republican
- Profession: Banker

William Edwin Lee (January 8, 1852 – November 16, 1920) was a Minnesota politician and Speaker of the Minnesota House of Representatives.

== Biography ==
William E. Lee was born in Alton, Illinois on January 8, 1852.

He first served in the Minnesota House of Representatives from 1885 to 1889, and was sent back to the body from 1893 to 1895. He was elected Speaker of the House during his second tenure in office. In 1896 he ran for governor, but was defeated in the Republican primary by incumbent David Marston Clough. He twice attempted to primary governor Adolph Olson Eberhart, first in 1912. In 1914, he was victorious in the Republican primary, but lost the general election.

He died from liver cancer at his home in Long Prairie, Minnesota on November 16, 1920.

Party political offices
Preceded by Adolph Olson Eberhart	Republican nominee for Governor of Minnesota; 1914	Succeeded by Joseph A. A. Burnquist
Political offices
Preceded by Ezra T. Champlin	Speaker of the Minnesota House of Representatives; 1893–1895	Succeeded by Samuel R. Van Sant
