= 1918 Minnesota lieutenant gubernatorial election =

- November 5, 1918
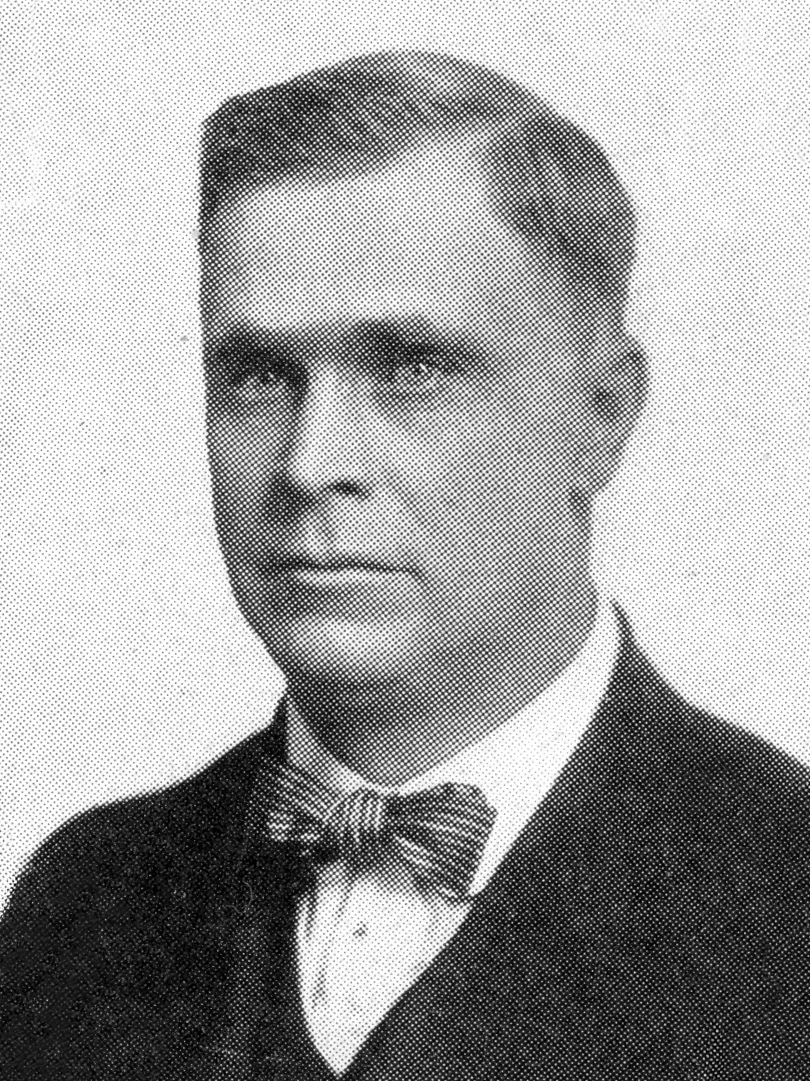

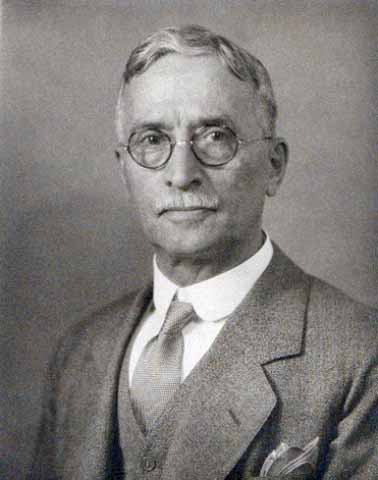
Nominee	Thomas Frankson	Charles H. Helweg	George D. Haggard
Party	Republican	Democratic	National
Popular vote	198,878	97,350	44,336
Percentage	58.4%	28.58%	13.02%
- County results Frankson: 40–50% 50–60% 60–70% 70–80%
Lieutenant Governor before election
Thomas Frankson
Republican
Elected Lieutenant Governor
Thomas Frankson
Republican

The 1918 Minnesota lieutenant gubernatorial election took place on November 5, 1918. Incumbent Lieutenant Governor Thomas Frankson of the Republican Party of Minnesota defeated Minnesota Democratic Party challenger Charles H. Helweg and National Party candidate George D. Haggard.

== Results ==
1918 lieutenant gubernatorial election, Minnesota
Party	Candidate	Votes	%	±%
Republican	Thomas Frankson (incumbent)	198,878	58.40%	+1.65%
Democratic	Charles H. Helweg	97,350	28.58%	+1.08%
National	George D. Haggard	44,336	13.02%	n/a
Majority		101,528	29.82%	
Turnout		340,564		
Republican hold		Swing		
