= Thomas Frankson =

American politician

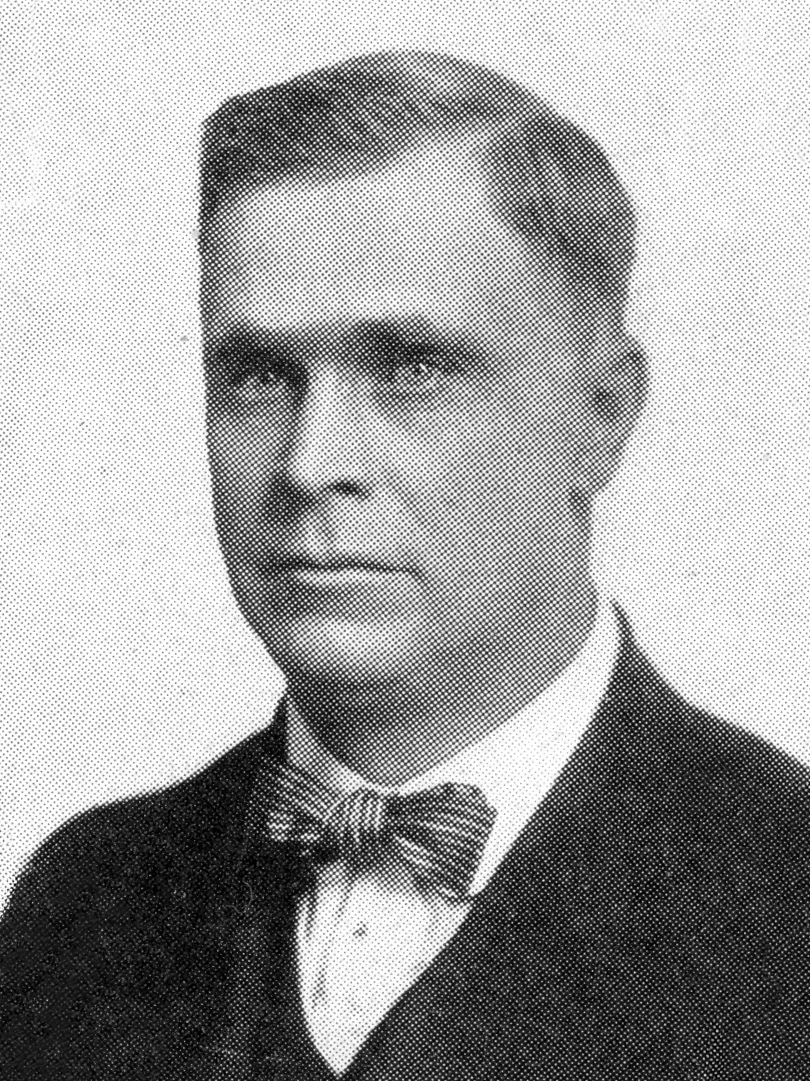
- Frankson in 1917

22nd Lieutenant Governor of Minnesota
- In office January 2, 1917 – January 4, 1921
- Governor: Joseph A. A. Burnquist
- Preceded by: George H. Sullivan
- Succeeded by: Louis L. Collins

Personal details
- Born: September 16, 1869 York Township, Minnesota, U.S.
- Died: June 8, 1939 (aged 69) St Paul, Minnesota, U.S.
- Party: Republican
- Spouse: Hannah Inglebret
- Profession: lawyer, land developer, bison farmer

Thomas Frankson (September 16, 1869 – June 8, 1939) was a lawyer, real estate developer, and politician who served as the 22nd lieutenant governor of Minnesota from 1917 to 1921.

== Biography ==
Frankson was born in York Township, Minnesota in 1869. In 1900, he graduated from the University of Minnesota law school and was admitted to the bar. He practiced law briefly before returning to Spring Valley, Minnesota to set up a real estate business. He heavily advertised, chartered railroad sleeper cars for prospective customers, and traded land for a hotel, farm machinery, and livestock. He was also an avid collector, including of animals. He acquired his first buffalo in 1906, and also kept deer, Shetland ponies, elk, and other animals in a "zoo" at his home.

In 1906, Frankson entered politics, running for the Republican nomination for the state senate seat in Fillmore County. He was then elected to the Minnesota house in 1911. He was especially strongly in favor of a "tonnage tax" on iron ore, arguing that U.S. Steel was under-taxed.

Following the 1913 legislative session, Frankson moved to St. Paul in 1913, where he developed land under the company name, Frankson's Land Agency which worked to develop several Como neighborhoods. Frankson's motto was "A rented house is not a home". His newspaper ad described his development as an "exclusive residence district" without "saloons, stores or flats" or "colored people".

He built a home at 1349 Midway Parkway on the Western border of Como Park in St. Paul that is referred to as the Thomas Frankson House today. He raised bison in a private buffalo pasture a few blocks West of his home near what is now Bison Street and Holy Childhood Catholic Church and School. He attempted to donate the land and animals to the City of St. Paul as a "pocket edition of Como Park"; In 1915, the animals were accepted by the new zoo at Como Park.

Frankson campaigned for the Lt. Governor seat in 1916. His main opponent was established politician James A. Peterson. Frankson won the nomination but a group of voters asked a judge to disqualify Farnkson for violating the Corrupt Practices Act, allegedly having spent $25,000 campaigning when the legal limit was $3,500. His reported expenditure with the secretary of state's office was $2,855. Frankson was elected to the position that fall and then to a second term. He then ran for Governor, finishing a dismal third in the race with 8.92% of the vote.

Frankson sold thirty acres of undeveloped land to the City of St. Paul for a golf course at Como Park, selling for less than the appraised value and donating $2,000 to get the course started. Frankson, who had embraced independent political leanings, endorsed Floyd B. Olson who went on to become the state's first Farmer-Labor governor. Olson offered to appoint Frankson as the secretary of the Rural Credit Bureau, which was then abolished by the legisature.

He died June 8, 1939, in St. Paul, Minnesota after he climbed into a tree to remove broken branches from a storm. He was found on the ground unconscious and died the next day at the hospital.

Party political offices
Preceded by Joseph A. A. Burnquist	Republican nominee for Lieutenant Governor of Minnesota; 1916, 1918	Succeeded by Louis L. Collins
Political offices
Preceded by George H. Sullivan	Lieutenant Governor of Minnesota; 1917–1921	Succeeded by Louis L. Collins
