= 1916 Minnesota lieutenant gubernatorial election =

- November 7, 1916
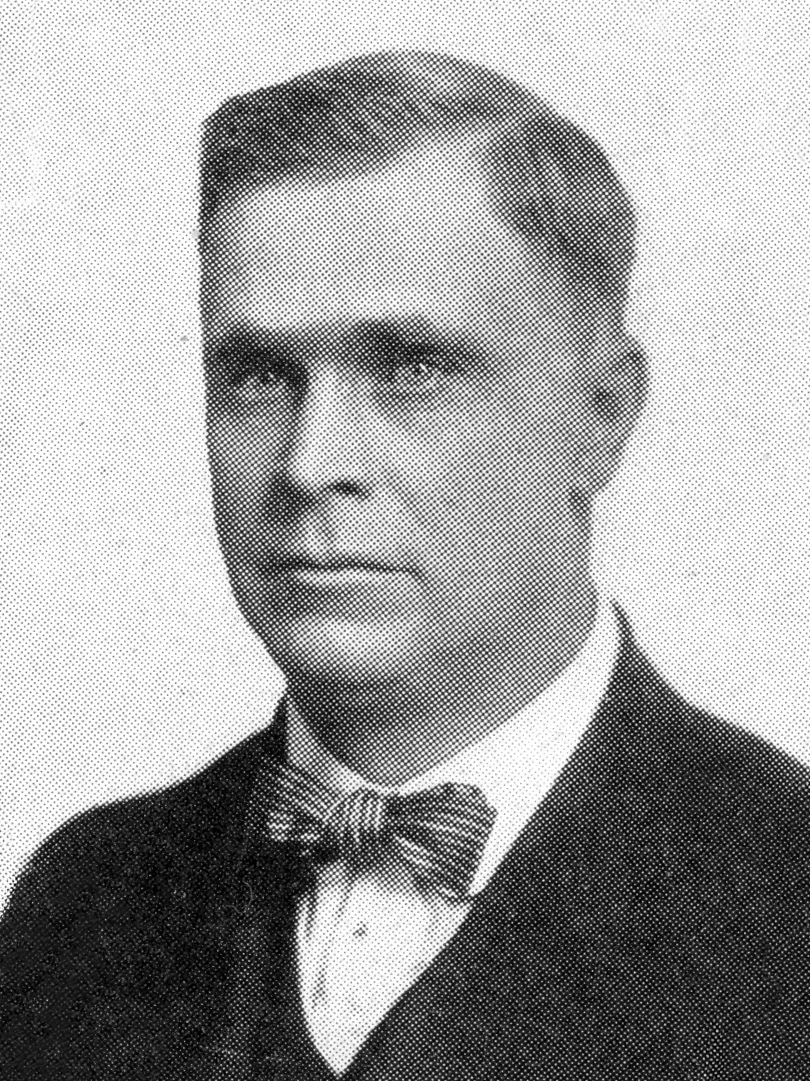

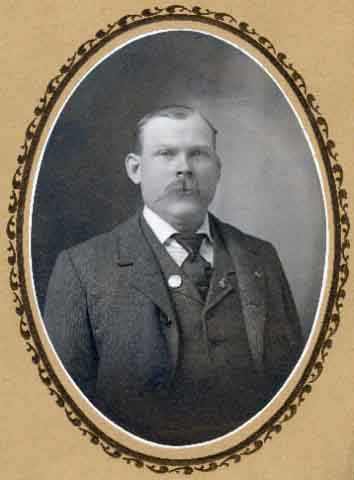

Nominee	Thomas Frankson	Julius Thorson
Party	Republican	Democratic
Popular vote	213,604	103,509
Percentage	56.75%	27.5%
Nominee	Andrew Hanson	L. A. Simonson
Party	Socialist	Prohibition
Popular vote	33,628	25,662
Percentage	8.93%	6.82%
- County results Frankson: 40–50% 50–60% 60–70% 70–80% Thorson: 40–50% Hanson: 30–40%
Lieutenant Governor before election
George H. Sullivan
Republican
Elected Lieutenant Governor
Thomas Frankson
Republican

The 1916 Minnesota lieutenant gubernatorial election took place on November 7, 1916. Republican Party of Minnesota candidate Thomas Frankson defeated Minnesota Democratic Party challenger Julius Thorson, Socialist Party of Minnesota candidate Andrew Hanson, and Prohibition Party candidate L. A. Simonson.

== Results ==
1916 Lieutenant Gubernatorial Election, Minnesota
Party	Candidate	Votes	%	±%
Republican	Thomas Frankson	213,604	56.75%	+8.47%
Democratic	Julius Thorson	103,509	27.50%	−6.16%
Socialist	Andrew Hanson	33,628	8.93%	+0.07%
Prohibition	L. A. Simonson	25,662	6.82%	+0.96%
Majority		110,095	29.25%	
Turnout		376,403		
Republican hold		Swing		
