= Charles Hinman Graves =

American politician (1839–1928)

C.H. Graves
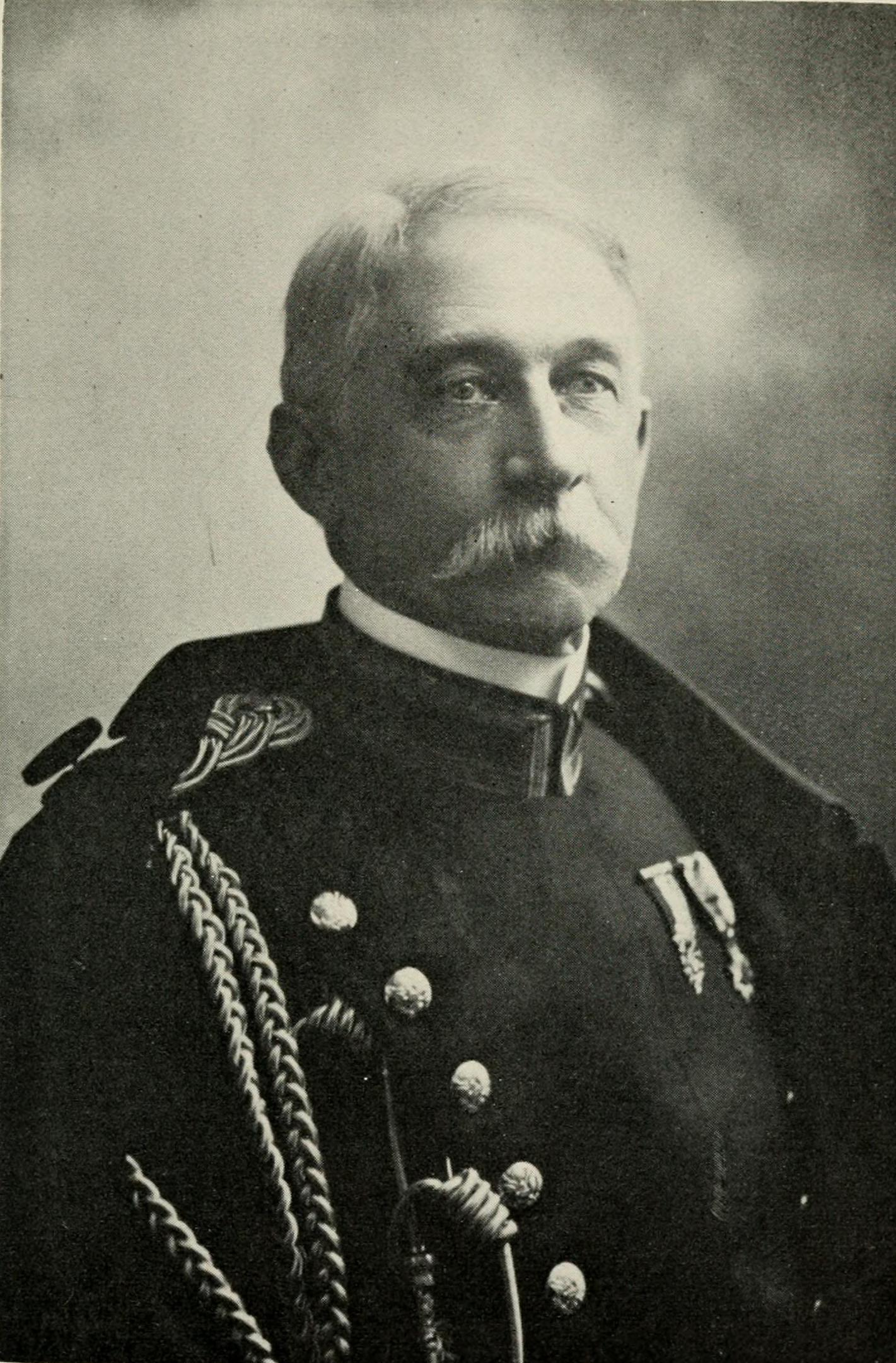
- Graves in 1909

15th United States Minister to Sweden
- In office May 31, 1905 – December 12, 1913
- President: Theodore Roosevelt; William Howard Taft; Woodrow Wilson
- Preceded by: William W. Thomas Jr.
- Succeeded by: Ira Nelson Morris

1st United States Minister to Norway
- In office May 31, 1905 – August 6, 1906
- President: Theodore Roosevelt
- Preceded by: Diplomatic relations established
- Succeeded by: Herbert H. D. Peirce

19th Speaker of the Minnesota House of Representatives
- In office 1889–1891
- Preceded by: William Rush Merriam
- Succeeded by: Ezra T. Champlin

9th Mayor of Duluth
- In office 1881–1883
- Preceded by: J.D. Ensign
- Succeeded by: Joshua B. Culver

Personal details
- Born: August 14, 1839 Springfield, Massachusetts, U.S.
- Died: October 7, 1928 (aged 89) Santa Barbara, California, U.S.
- Party: Republican
- Spouse: Alice Kinney (m. 1905)
- Profession: Soldier; diplomat
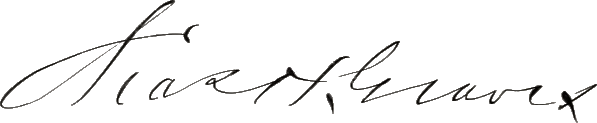
- Signature

Military service
- Allegiance: United States; Union
- Branch/service: United States Army; Union Army
- Years of service: 1861–1870
- Rank: Colonel
- Battles/wars: American Civil War

Charles Hinman Graves (August 14, 1839 – October 7, 1928) was an American army officer, politician, and diplomat.

== Military ==
Hinman was born in Springfield, Massachusetts on August 14, 1839. After the outbreak of the Civil War, he joined the Army of the Potomac as a sergeant. Breveted four times for gallantry in action, he participated in many battles in the Eastern Theater, and finished the war at the rank of lieutenant colonel. The war over, Graves decided to stay in the army until December 1870, at which time he was discharged from the Thirty-fourth infantry. (Note: His obituary in The New York Times claims he was a captain at that time, whereas Minnesota's State Capitol and the Minnesota Legislative Reference Library state he was a Colonel.)

== Politics ==
Following his discharge from the army, Graves moved to the port city of Duluth, Minnesota, where he initially involved himself various business ventures including shipping, real estate, iron mining, and insurance, and became the first person to ship wheat from Duluth's port in 1871. He then entered local politics, first as a Republican in the Minnesota Senate representing District 29 from 1873 to 1876. He then served as Mayor of Duluth from 1881 to 1883. On November 11, 1888, he was elected to the Minnesota House of Representatives from District 46, serving a term from January 9, 1889, to January 5, 1891, during which time he served as Speaker of the House for the twenty-sixth Minnesota Legislature.

== Later life ==
Graves was later appointed United States Ambassador to Sweden from 1905 to 1913 and to Norway from 1905 to 1906. Just before leaving for his posts, Graves announced at a farewell banquet that he would be marrying a Miss Alice Kinney from Athens, Pennsylvania on April 25. The two married; his wife died in 1949.

Graves died in Santa Barbara, California on October 7, 1928.

== Notes ==
Political offices
Preceded by William Rush Merriam	Speaker of the Minnesota House of Representatives; 1889–1891	Succeeded by Ezra T. Champlin
Diplomatic posts
Preceded by William W. Thomas, Jr.	U.S. Ambassador to Sweden; 1905–1913	Succeeded by Ira Nelson Morris
Preceded by Position Created	United States Ambassador to Norway; 1905–1906	Succeeded by Herbert H.D. Peirce
