= 27 Crocus Place =

- U.S. Historic district – Contributing property
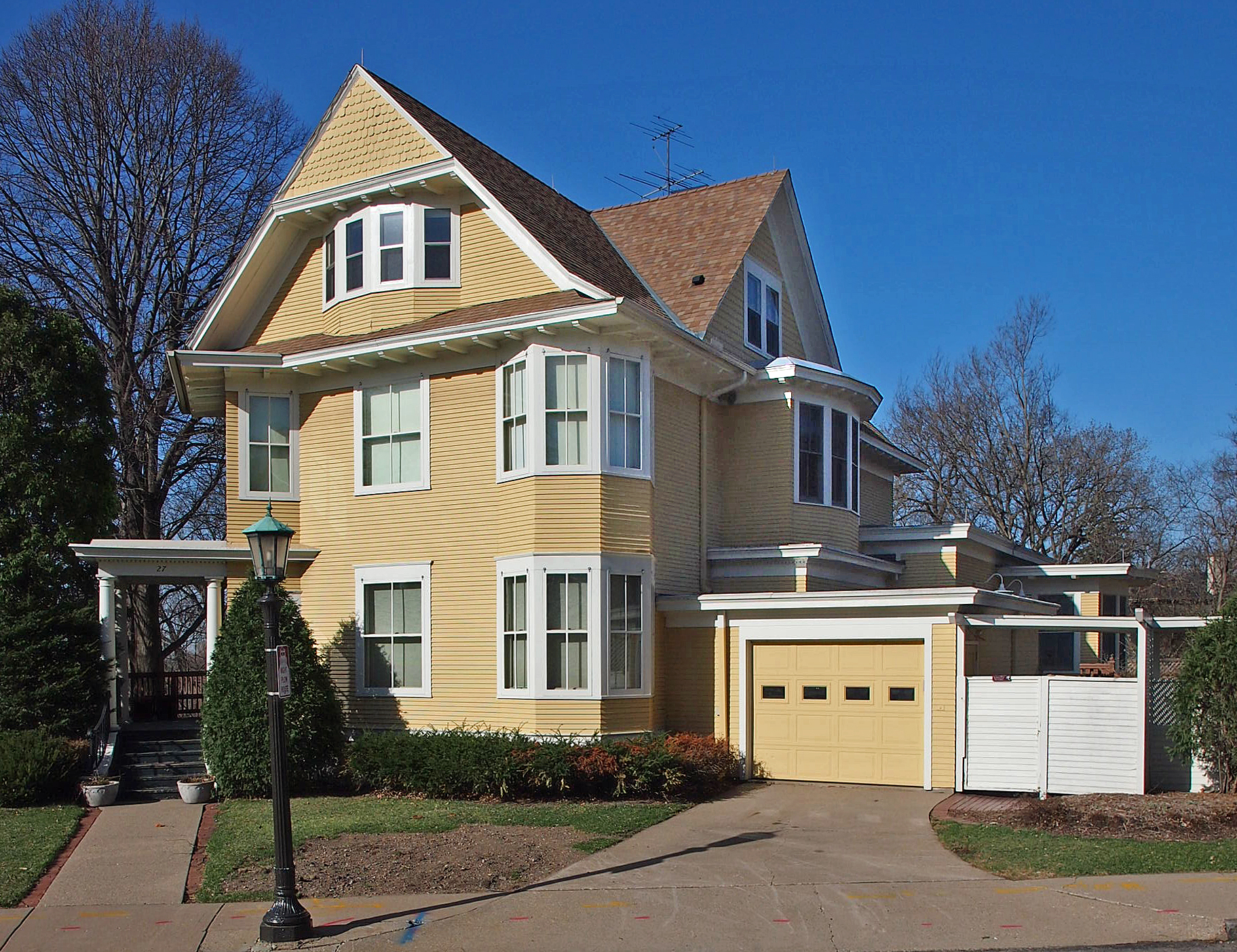
- The historic house in 2015

- Location within Minnesota Location within the United States
- Location: 27 Crocus Place; Saint Paul, Minnesota
- Coordinates: 44°56′10″N 93°7′35″W
- Built: 1902
- Architect: John Magnus Carlson
- Architectural style: Queen Anne revival
- Part of: Historic Hill District (ID76001067)

27 Crocus Place, also known as the J.M. Carlson House, was a 1902 Queen Anne style timber-frame house in Saint Paul in the U.S. state of Minnesota. It was a contributing property to the Historic Hill District.

It was the home of Minnesota Governor Joseph A. A. Burnquist where he wrote several works in the series "Minnesota and its People" during the 1920s.

Despite historic preservation efforts by the city and neighbors, a court approved its demolition in 2015. The final owners of the house, Fred and Renee Pritzker, had it demolished to build a new residence for their adult son, who has Angelman syndrome. In the settlement with the city, they were required to document the historic structure before it was destroyed.
