= Samuel Y. Gordon =

American politician

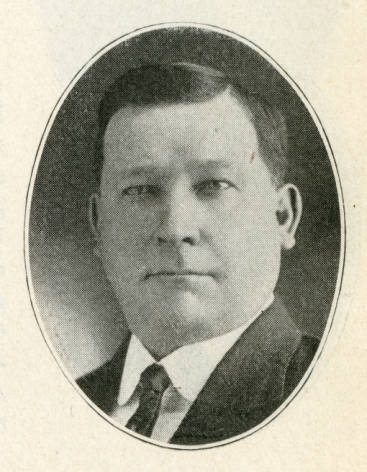
- Samuel Y. Gordon, 1915

19th Lieutenant Governor of Minnesota
- In office January 3, 1911 – January 7, 1913
- Governor: Adolph Olson Eberhart
- Preceded by: Edward Everett Smith
- Succeeded by: Joseph A. A. Burnquist

Member of the Minnesota House of Representatives
- In office 1914-1916

Personal details
- Born: September 14, 1861 Lexington, Indiana, U.S.
- Died: December 10, 1940 (aged 79) St. Paul, Minnesota, U.S.
- Party: Republican
- Spouse: Jennie May Plotner
- Profession: educator, publisher, public official, legislator, state printer

Samuel Y. Gordon (September 14, 1861 – December 10, 1940) was a Minnesota legislator and the 19th lieutenant governor of Minnesota.

== Life and career ==
Gordon was born in Lexington, Indiana in 1861. His family relocated to Minnesota shortly after he was born, living in Meeker County and Traverse County before settling in Browns Valley, Minnesota. Gordon worked with his father's farm equipment business and in 1885 founded a newspaper, The Inter-Lake Tribune. In 1889 or 1890 he married Jennie May Plotner with whom he had four children.

Gordon was involved in local Republican politics in Browns Valley, serving two terms as postmaster in addition to positions with the village council, school board and local Republican party committee. In 1911, Gordon was elected as lieutenant governor under Adolph Olson Eberhart. He served from 1911 to 1913. He also served in the Minnesota House of Representatives from 1914 to 1916 and was associated with the temperance movement.

Gordon died in St. Paul, Minnesota in 1940. He is buried at Sunset Memorial Park Cemetery in Minneapolis, Minnesota.

Party political offices
Preceded by Adolph Olson Eberhart	Republican nominee for Lieutenant Governor of Minnesota; 1910	Succeeded by Joseph A. A. Burnquist
Political offices
Preceded by Edward Everett Smith	Lieutenant Governor of Minnesota; 1911 – 1913	Succeeded by Joseph A. A. Burnquist
