= Karl G. Neumeier =

American politician (1889–1992)

Karl G. Neumeier (January 29, 1889 – October 30, 1992) was an American lawyer and politician.

Neumeier was born in Stillwater, Washington County, Minnesota, and graduated from Stillwater High School in 1907. He graduated from the University of Minnesota and received his law degree from William Mitchell College of Law. He lived in Stillwater with his wife and family and practiced law there. He was in the Minnesota Senate from 1935 to 1950 and on the University of Minnesota Board of Regents from 1953 to 1959. Neumeier died at the Greeley Health Care Center in Stillwater. His funeral and burial were in Stillwater.
