= Joseph A. A. Burnquist =

American politician (1879–1961)

Joseph Alfred Arner Burnquist
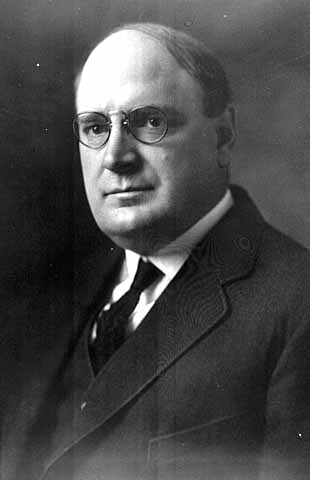

19th Governor of Minnesota
- In office December 30, 1915 – January 5, 1921
- Lieutenant: George H. Sullivan; Thomas Frankson
- Preceded by: Winfield Scott Hammond
- Succeeded by: J. A. O. Preus

20th Lieutenant Governor of Minnesota
- In office January 7, 1913 – December 30, 1915
- Governor: Adolph Olson Eberhart; Winfield Scott Hammond
- Preceded by: Samuel Y. Gordon
- Succeeded by: George H. Sullivan

21st Attorney General of Minnesota
- In office January 2, 1939 – January 3, 1955
- Governor: Harold Stassen; Edward John Thye; Luther Youngdahl; C. Elmer Anderson
- Preceded by: William S. Ervin
- Succeeded by: Miles Lord

Member of the Minnesota House of Representatives
- In office 1909–1912

Personal details
- Born: July 21, 1879 Dayton, Iowa, U.S.
- Died: January 12, 1961 (aged 81) Minneapolis, Minnesota, U.S.
- Resting place: Lakewood Cemetery
- Party: Republican
- Spouse: Mary Louise Cross (m. 1906)
- Education: University of Minnesota Law School
- Profession: Lawyer, politician

Joseph Alfred Arner Burnquist (July 21, 1879 – January 12, 1961) was an American attorney and Republican politician in Minnesota. He served in the Minnesota State Legislature from 1909 to 1911, was elected the 20th lieutenant governor of Minnesota in 1912, and then served as the 19th governor of Minnesota from December 30, 1915, to January 5, 1921. He became governor after the death of Governor Winfield Scott Hammond (1863–1915).

Elected in 1938, Burnquist returned to serve as Minnesota Attorney General from January 2, 1939, until January 3, 1955, establishing what is now the second-longest record of continuous service in that position.

== Early years ==
Joseph Alfred Arner Burnquist was born in Dayton, Iowa, to parents of Swedish descent. He attended Carleton College in Northfield, Minnesota, and earned his law degree in 1905 from the University of Minnesota Law School.

After a brief time practicing law in Saint Paul, he was elected to the Minnesota House of Representatives in 1908, serving from 1909 to 1912.

== Political career ==
=== Governor of Minnesota ===
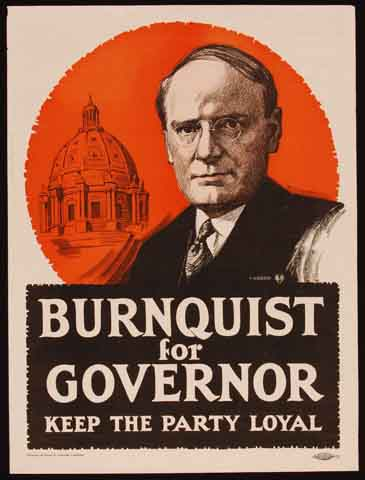
1918 election poster

During his second term as lieutenant governor, Burnquist succeeded Governor Hammond to office on December 30, 1915, after Hammond died unexpectedly.

Social and political tensions increased during the next two years, as Americans became concerned about the war in Europe. At the same time, labor unions were organizing and workers went on strike for better wages and conditions. Turbulent times surrounded the United States' entrance into the Great War (World War I) in 1917. Having attracted waves of European immigrants in the previous decades, US officials were anxious about the loyalties of these new residents and their native-born citizen descendants. Many classes in foreign languages were dropped from American public schools.

In 1917, ten days after the US entered the war, Burnquist signed legislation to create the Minnesota Commission of Public Safety (MCPS) to monitor public sentiment toward the war. The seven-member commission, ostensibly nonpartisan, opposed groups and actions its members considered suspect, such as immigrants, labor unions, and the Non-Partisan League. Burnquist and the commission were granted near-dictatorial powers, which they used to advance their own business interests by suppressing labor unions. The MCPS also played into anti-German sentiment by targeting ethnic German Minnesotans. Governor Burnquist threatened German-American citizens in New Ulm, Minnesota, with deportation on suspicion of loyalty to Prussia.

The Sedition Act of 1918 curtailed free speech during time of war, and the Immigration Act of 1919 allowed officials to deport any alien or naturalized citizen who advocated the overthrow of the government by force.

But Burnquist also worked in other areas. He initiated legislation to improve state highways, disaster assistance programs, labor relations, and, especially the welfare of children. He was elected to a full term in November 1918.

=== Attorney General of Minnesota ===
After leaving office, Burnquist practiced law for 17 years. During the 1920s, Burnquist wrote several works in the series "Minnesota and its People" at his home in Saint Paul.

In 1939 he was elected as state Attorney General. Repeatedly re-elected, he served 16 years and 1 day, nearly establishing the record for the longest-serving attorney general of Minnesota. (Skip Humphrey served 16 years and 3 days by the end of his tenure in 1999, winning this ranking.)

== President of Saint Paul NAACP Chapter ==
Burnquist was president of the Saint Paul chapter of the NAACP from 1914 and ca. 1921. The Duluth lynchings occurred during his tenure in this position and also during his second term as governor; however, his responses to the event were cautious and limited.

== Personal life ==
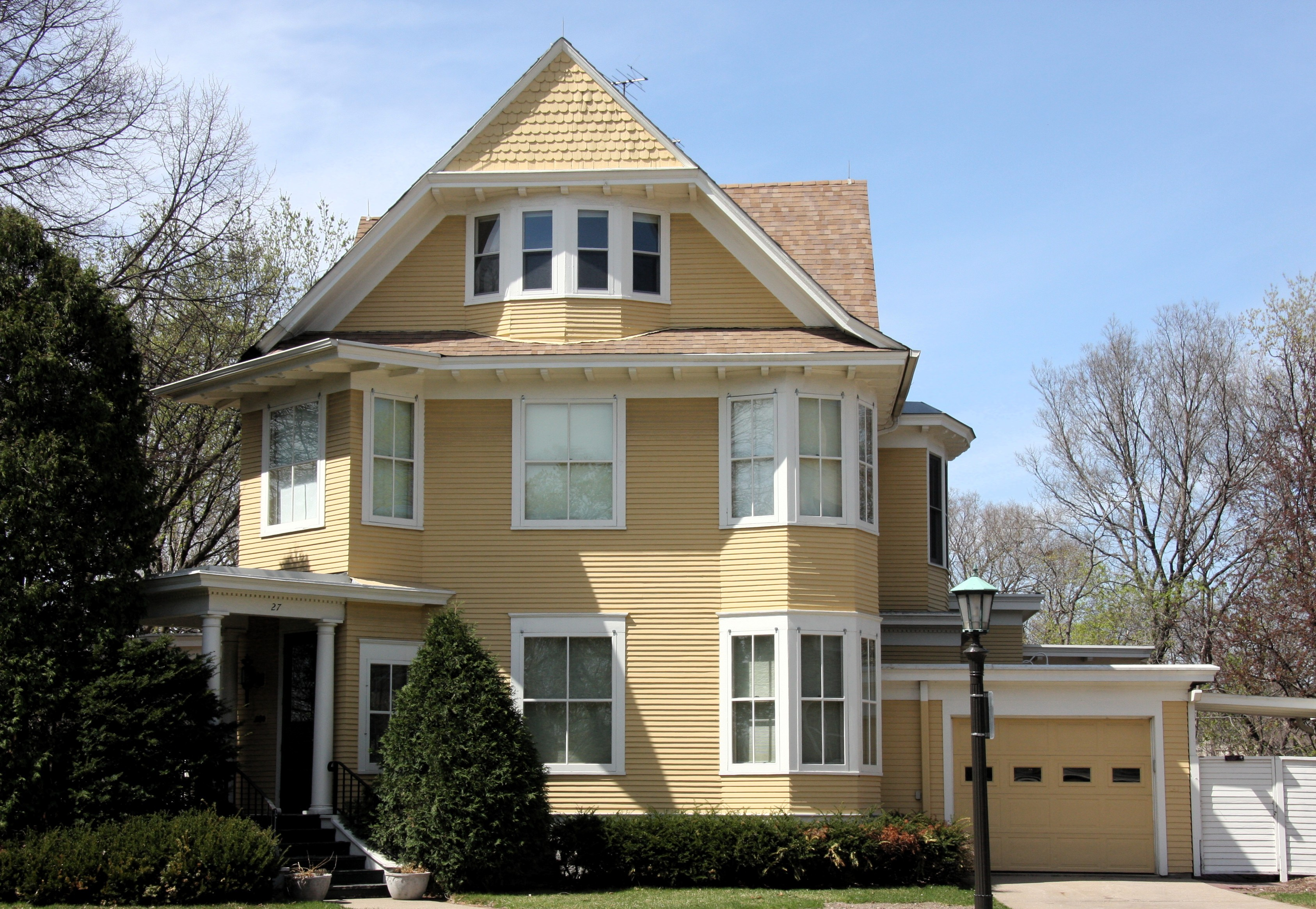
Burnquist's home at 27 Crocus Place in Saint Paul

Burnquist was married on January 1, 1906, to Mary Louise Cross (1880–1966). Burnquist died in Minneapolis at the age of 81. He was buried in Lakewood Cemetery.

== Other sources ==
- Algot E. Strand (1910) A History of the Swedish-Americans of Minnesota, Volume 3 (Lewis Publishing)

== Related reading ==
- Biographical information and his gubernatorial records are available for research use at the Minnesota Historical Society.

Party political offices
Preceded by Samuel Y. Gordon	Republican nominee for Lieutenant Governor of Minnesota; 1912, 1914	Succeeded by Thomas Frankson
Preceded by William E. Lee	Republican nominee for Governor of Minnesota; 1916, 1918	Succeeded by J. A. O. Preus
Preceded by Oscar Youngdahl	Republican nominee for Attorney General of Minnesota; 1938, 1940, 1942, 1944, 1946, 1948, 1950, 1952	Succeeded by Bernhard LeVander
Political offices
Preceded by Winfield Scott Hammond	Governor of Minnesota; 1915–1921	Succeeded by J. A. O. Preus
Preceded by Samuel Y. Gordon	Lieutenant Governor of Minnesota; 1913–1915	Succeeded by George H. Sullivan
Legal offices
Preceded by William S. Ervin	Minnesota Attorney General; 1939–1955	Succeeded by Miles Lord
