= E. E. Lobeck =

Norwegian-American politician and lecturer

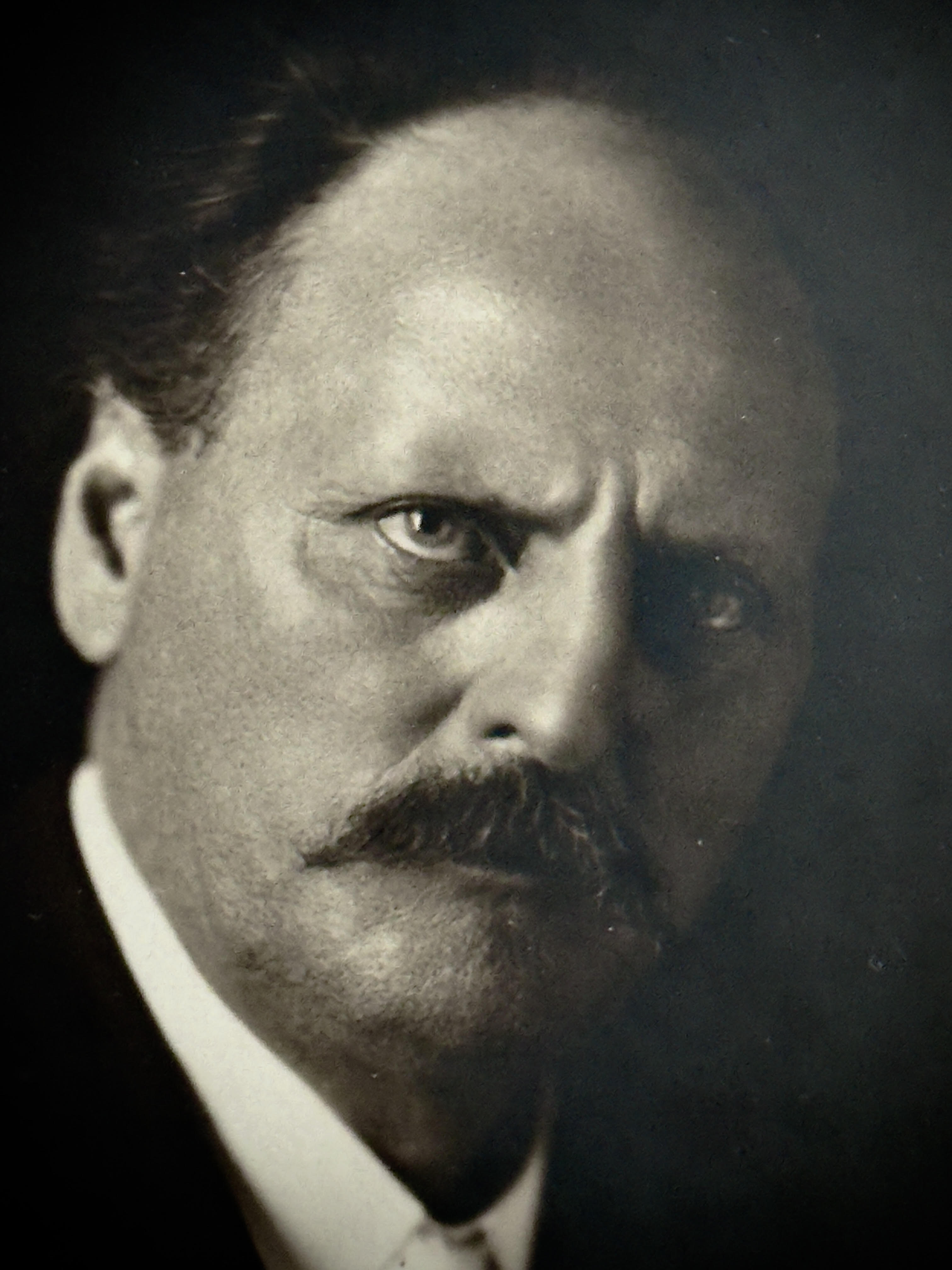
- c. 1920

Member of the Minnesota House of Representatives from the 58th district
- In office January 7, 1907 – January 1, 1911
- Preceded by: Office established
- Succeeded by: John J. Anderson

Member of the Minnesota Senate from the 47th district
- In office January 4, 1915 – January 5, 1919
- Preceded by: John D. Sullivan
- Succeeded by: Iver J. Lee

Personal details
- Born: Engebret Engebretsen Lobeck; October 11, 1864 Trysil, Norway
- Died: October 30, 1922 (aged 58) Alexandria, Minnesota, U.S.
- Resting place: Kinkead Cemetery
- Party: Prohibition
- Other political affiliations: Nonpartisan League, National
- Spouse: Martha Nordby
- Children: 6
- Parents: Embret Persen Løvbekksetra (father); Inger Olsdatter Støa (mother)
- Committees: See section

Engebret Engebretsen "E. E." Lobeck (11 October 1864 – 30 October 1922) was a Norwegian-American politician who served in the Minnesota House of Representatives from 1907 to 1911 and in the Minnesota Senate from 1915 to 1919, representing Douglas and Pope counties.

A member of the Prohibition Party, Lobeck ran for the office of governor of Minnesota on the party's ticket in 1912, where he received 9.38% of the vote. In his 1914 winning bid for state Senator, he ran under the status of nonpartisanship, and in 1918 he ran as a member of the National Party.

Born in Trysil, Norway in 1864, Lobeck moved to Minnesota as a child and grew up on a Douglas County farm. He was educated in several Lutheran institutions and began his speaking on prohibition in 1890, moving to Farwell three years later. He married Martha Nordby in 1896, with whom he had six children.

Lobeck moved back to Douglas County in 1902, settling in Alexandria. His political leanings aligned closely with that of the Nonpartisan League, and shortly after the organization reached Alexandria he became one of their directors. Lobeck published two works; one a set of poems, the other a story about temperance.

Lobeck's political career and campaigning lasted for around two decades. He ran for the office of US Representative thrice, Minnesota Representative twice, and governor of Minnesota and Minnesota Senator once each. He died of natural causes in 1922.

== Early life and education ==
A teenage prtrait photograph of Lobeck, taken around when he was 15 years old.

Lobeck was born in the Norwegian commune of Trysil on 11 October 1864. Three years later, he and his family moved to the state of Minnesota, where he would be raised on a farm near Holmes City until moving to Farwell in 1893. He attended the private Minneapolis high school Wraaman's Academy. He then attended the Lutheran educational institutions of Augsburg Seminary in Minneapolis and Willmar Seminary in Willmar before taking a one-term Norwegian literature class at State University. In 1890, he would give up life as a farmer to become a speaker on temperance and prohibition.

== Electoral history ==
Year	Office	Party	Primary			General				Result	Swing	Ref
Year	Office	Party	Total	%	P.	Total	%	±%	P.	Result	Swing	Ref
1898	U.S. Representative	Prohibition	—N/a			1,693	4.36%	—	3rd	Lost	Hold	
1906	Minnesota Representative	Prohibition	—N/a			1,289	57.39%	—	1st	Won	Gain	
1908	Minnesota Representative	Prohibition	—N/a			1,575	50.19%	–7.20%	1st	Won	Hold	
1910	Minnesota Representative	Prohibition	—N/a			1,527	49.13%	–1.06%	2nd	Lost	Gain	
1912	Governor of Minnesota	Prohibition	2,616	100.0%	1st	29,876	9.38%	—	3rd	Lost	Hold	
1912	Governor of Minnesota	Prohibition	Uncontested			29,876	9.38%	—	3rd	Lost	Hold	
1914	Minnesota Senator	Nonpartisan	—N/a			2,755	53.28%	—	1st	Won	Gain	
1916	U.S. Representative	Prohibition	—N/a			11,961	30.07%	—	2nd	Lost	Hold	
1918	U.S. Representative	National	—N/a			16,587	43.66%	+13.59%	2nd	Lost	Hold	

== Committees ==
Throughout his legislative career, Lobeck served in the following committees:

- Agriculture (1907-1909)
- Crimes and Punishment (1907-1909)
- Game and Fish (1907-1909, 1915-1919)
- Printing (1907-1911)
- Public Accounts and Expenditures (1907-1909)
- State and Other Libraries (1907-1911)
- Compensation of Public Officials (1909-1911)
- Public Lands (1909-1911)
- State Normal Schools (1909-1911)
- State School at Owatonna (1909-1911)
- General Legislation (1915-1919)
- Municipal Affairs (1915-1919)
- Temperance (1915-1919)
- Employers Liability Laws (1917-1919)

== 1918 election ==
1917 newspaper political cartoon featuring Lobeck among other state senators with Scandinavian heritage

After winning the June National Party primaries unopposed for his 1918 US House District 7 bid, Lobeck sent a letter of endorsement to Nonpartisan League candidate Henrik Shipstead. A 1918 Willmar Tribune advertisement states that Lobeck was "willing to have another man win the election provided it was a man who stood for his own principles and for the common people, the farmers and labor". Following Shipstead's loss in the primaries, the Nonpartisan League, as well as the Democratic Party, issued statements endorsing Lobeck's candidacy.

Lobeck lost the election, which would be the last in which he was a candidate, to incumbent Republican Andrew Volstead. He came out of the election with 43.7% of the vote.

== Personal life ==
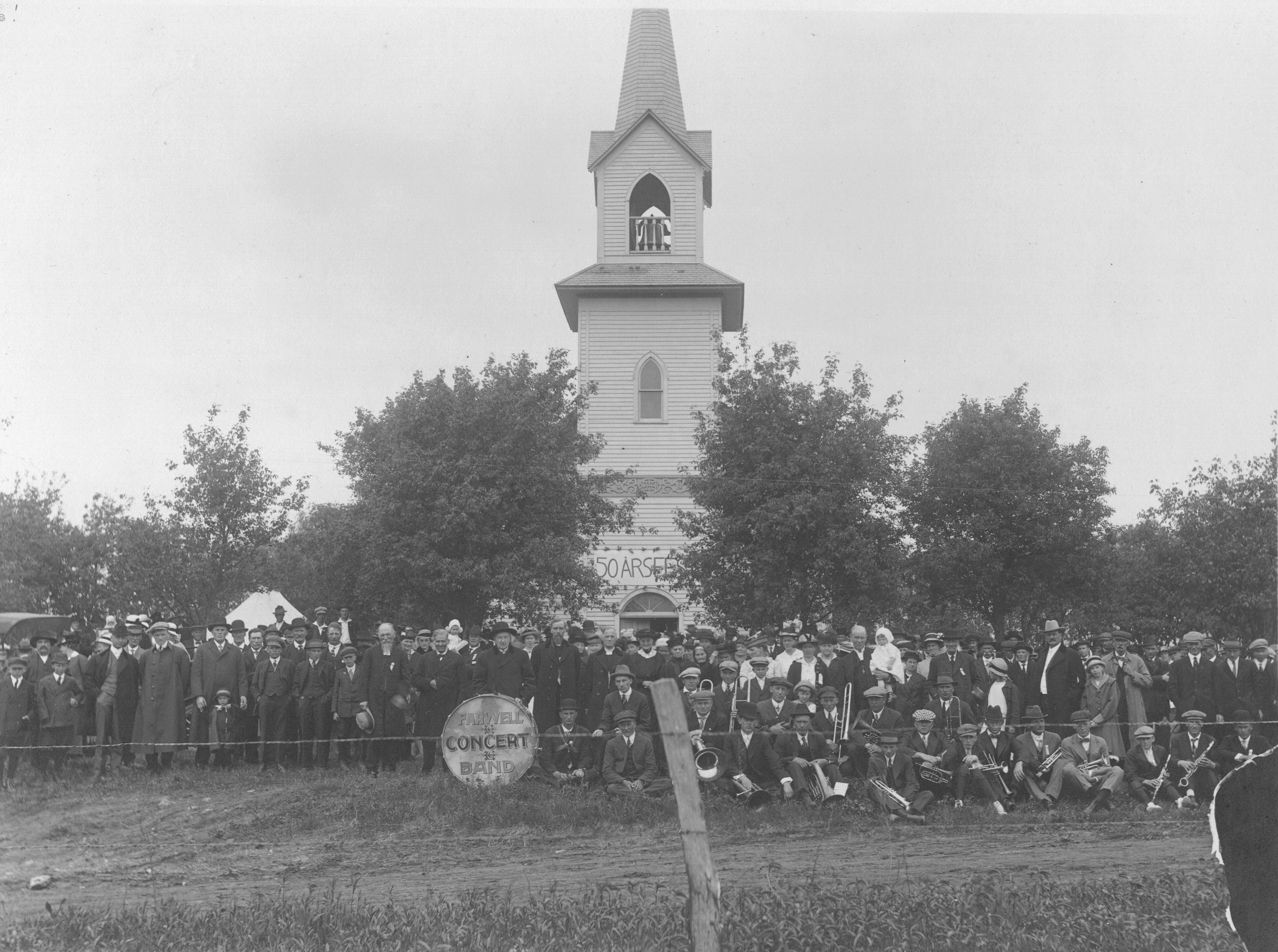
Lobeck with the Farwell Concert Band at the Oscar Lake Lutheran Church in 1916 for its 50th anniversary. He is in the second row, sixth from right.

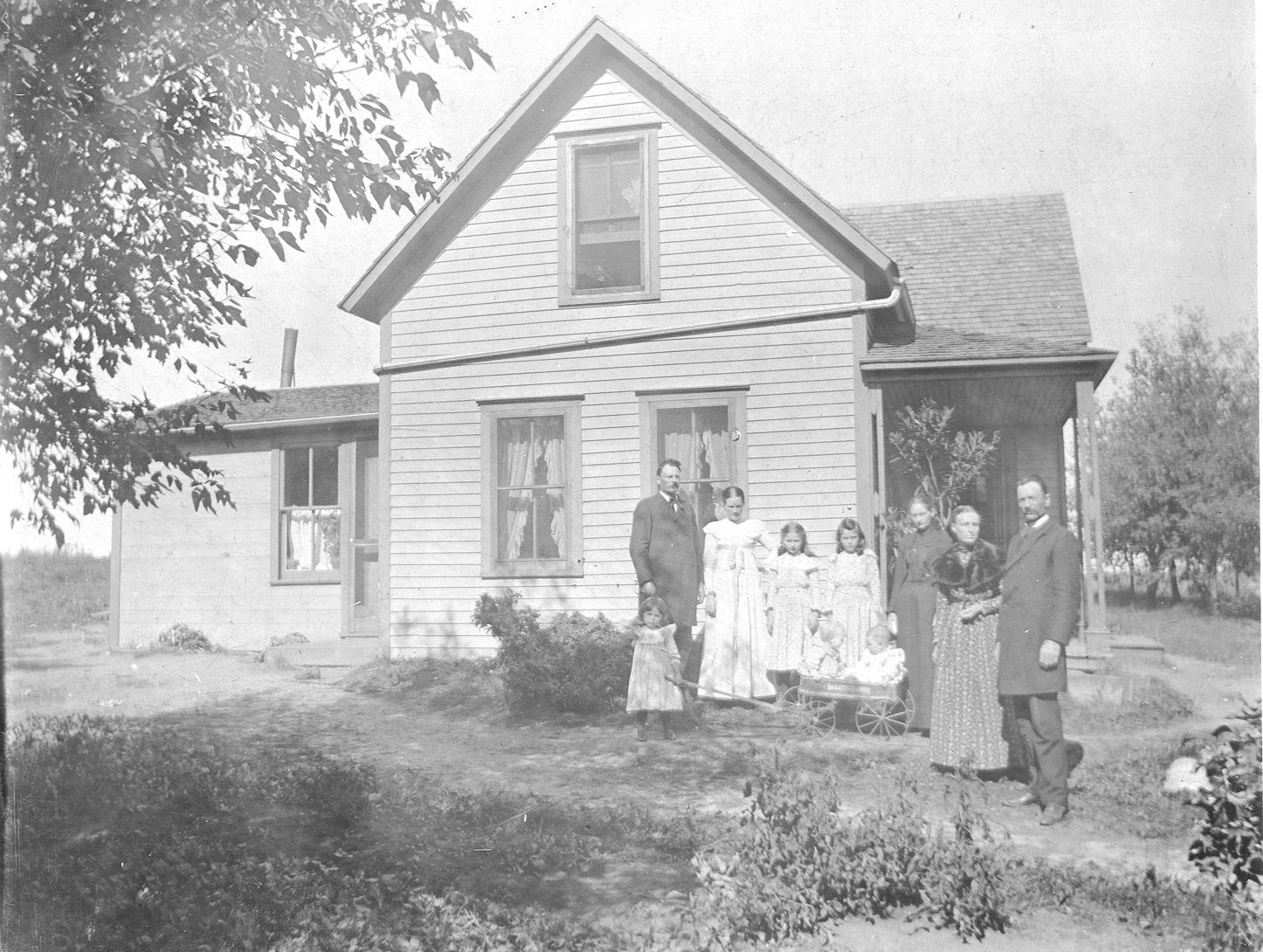
E. E. Lobeck and his family at their household near Alexandria in 1900.

Lobeck was a member of the Swedish Augustana synod. He married Martha Nordby on 3 June 1896 in Harwood Township of Cass County, North Dakota. They had five daughters together, Evangeline, Dagny, Constance, Martha, and Genevieve, as well as one son, Torarin.

After becoming a prohibition-speaker, he took on the secondary role of a Church singer and instructor. He moved to Alexandria in 1902.

Lobeck wrote a compilation of poems in 1894 and a novel about temperance and prohibition in 1899. By the time he was first elected in 1906, he was working as a prohibition lecturer in Alexandria, and by the time of his re-election he had become the president of Fremad Publishing Co. and director of the newspaper Park Region Echo.

In 1917, E. E. Lobeck was nominated as a member of the executive community for the newly formed pro-temperance union known as the Minnesota Dry Federation.His views were similar to the left-wing Nonpartisan League party, whereof he was a director. Starting in around July 1922, Lobeck worked as a lecturer and field secretary for the World's Purity Foundation. Lobeck died from heart complications on 30 October 1922.
