= Edward Everett Smith =

American politician

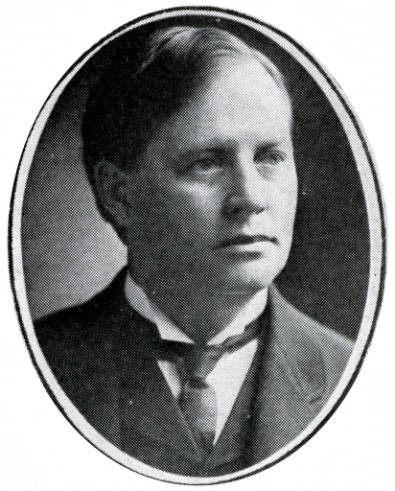
- Portrait of Edward Everett Smith in 1907

18th Lieutenant Governor of Minnesota
- In office September 25, 1909 – January 3, 1911
- Governor: Adolph Olson Eberhart
- Preceded by: Adolph Olson Eberhart
- Succeeded by: Samuel Y. Gordon

Member of the Minnesota Senate for the 43rd district
- In office January 2, 1899 – June 25, 1910

Member of the Minnesota House of Representatives from the 34th district
- In office January 7, 1895 – January 1, 1899

Personal details
- Born: May 5, 1861 Spring Valley, Minnesota
- Died: July 29, 1931 (aged 70) Minneapolis, Minnesota
- Party: Republican
- Profession: lawyer, legislator, advisor to Governor Preus

Edward Everett Smith (May 5, 1861 – July 29, 1931) was a Minnesota legislator and the 18th lieutenant governor of Minnesota. He was born in Spring Valley, Minnesota. He served in the Minnesota House of Representatives from January 7, 1895 - January 1, 1899 and served in the Minnesota Senate from January 2, 1899 - June 25, 1910. He was the President pro tempore when Adolph Olson Eberhart became Governor of Minnesota so he replaced Eberhart as Lieutenant Governor of Minnesota from September 25, 1909 – January 3, 1911. He kept his position as state senator until his term ended while being Lieutenant-Governor. He died in 1931 in Minneapolis.

Political offices
Preceded by Adolph Olson Eberhart	Lieutenant Governor of Minnesota; 1909–1911	Succeeded by Samuel Y. Gordon
