= Adolph Olson Eberhart =

American politician (1870–1944)

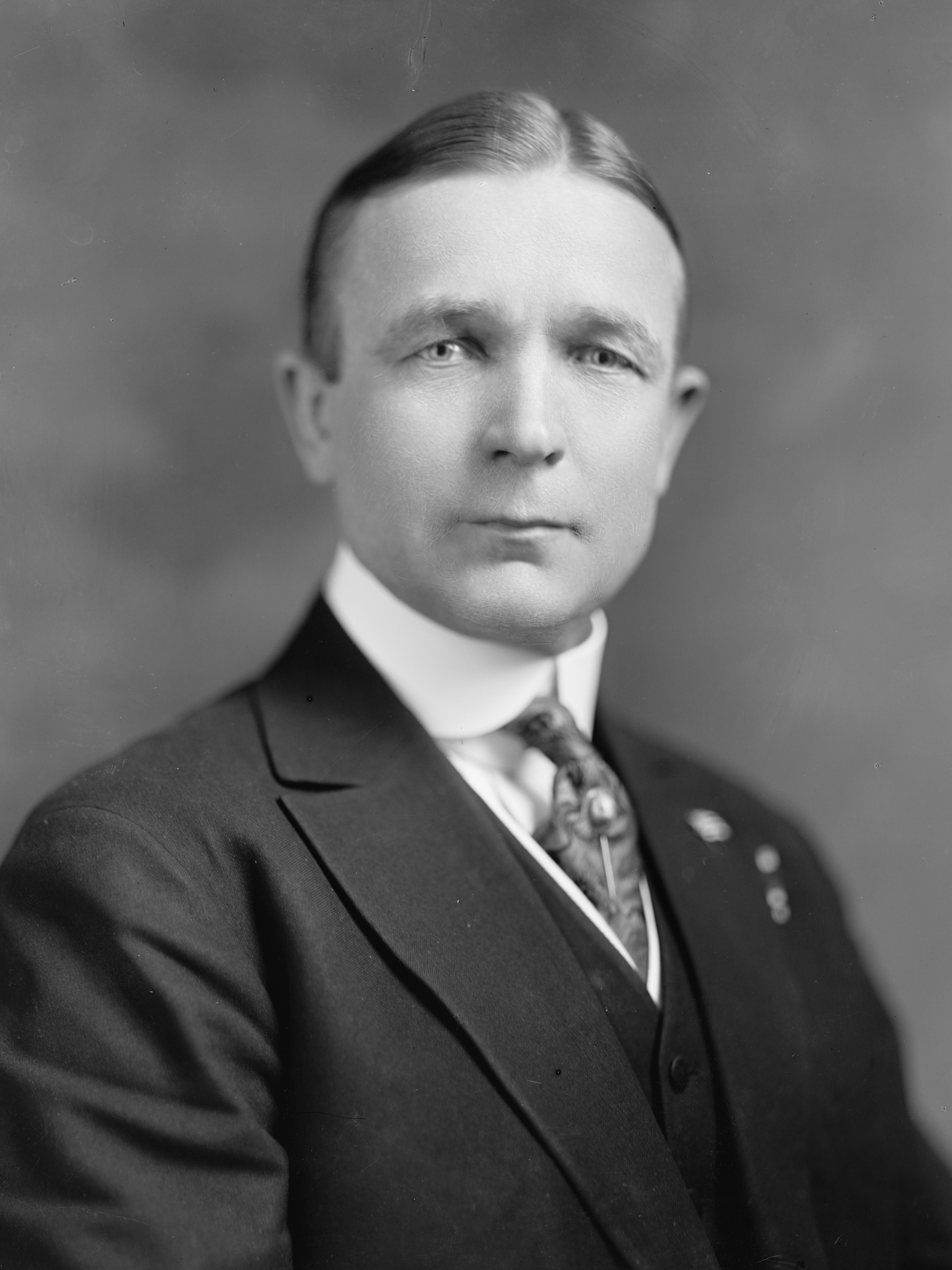

17th Governor of Minnesota
- In office September 21, 1909 – January 5, 1915
- Lieutenant: Edward Everett Smith; Samuel Y. Gordon; Joseph A. A. Burnquist
- Preceded by: John Albert Johnson
- Succeeded by: Winfield Scott Hammond

17th Lieutenant Governor of Minnesota
- In office January 7, 1907 – September 21, 1909
- Governor: John Albert Johnson
- Preceded by: Ray W. Jones
- Succeeded by: Edward Everett Smith

Member of the Minnesota Senate
- In office 1903-1907

Personal details
- Born: June 30, 1870 Frykerud Värmland, Sweden
- Died: December 6, 1944 (aged 74) Savage, Minnesota, U.S.
- Resting place: Lakewood Cemetery
- Party: Republican
- Spouse: Adele O.M. Koke
- Profession: politician

Adolph Olson Eberhart (June 30, 1870 – December 6, 1944) was an American politician who served as the 17th governor of Minnesota.

== Background ==
Adolph Olson Eberhart was born in Kil, in Värmland, Sweden, to Andrew and Louise Olson. Because of bad economic conditions, Andrew, Louise, and the whole family except Adolph immigrated to St. Peter, Minnesota. In 1882, Adolph joined them there. He graduated from Gustavus Adolphus College in 1895 and studied law at a law office in Mankato, Minnesota.

== Career ==
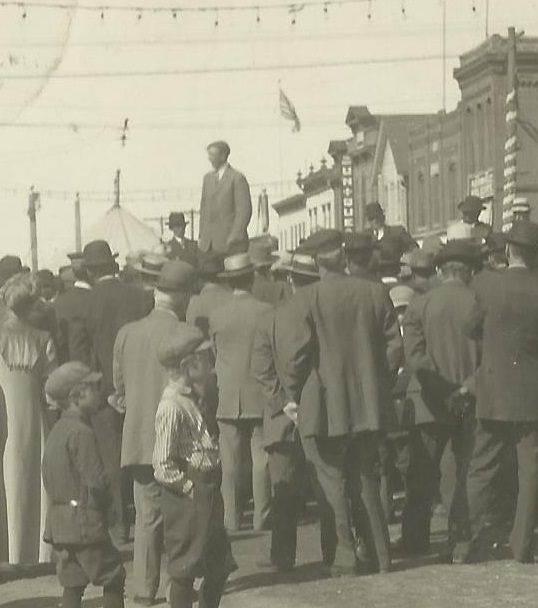
Eberhart above a crowd at the 1913 Goodhue County Fair in Zumbrota, Minnesota

Eberhart was a member of the Minnesota State Senate from 1903 to 1907. In 1906, he was elected the 17th Lieutenant Governor. He became the 17th Governor of Minnesota on September 21, 1909, when Governor John Albert Johnson died, and served until January 5, 1915. Eberhart was a Republican.

Minnesota elected governors and lieutenant governors on separate ballots until 1974, and occasionally the two were of different parties. Elected the youngest member of the state senate in 1902, the Eberhart was chosen as lieutenant governor four years later in the administration of the Democrat John Albert Johnson. Although his first partial term as governor resulted from Johnson's death in 1909, he subsequently won the office twice on his own merits.

=== As governor ===
An efficient administrator, Eberhart was also a consummate politician, and his detractors, including many Republicans, questioned his sincerity as well as the reputation of certain close associates. To assure his re-nomination in 1912, he called a special 13-day legislative session and deflated his critics by bulldozing through such progressive reforms as rural school consolidation and primary elections. The strategy worked; he avoided the censure of his own party and was re-nominated for a second full term in the first statewide primary. One of Eberhart's reforms was the end of capital punishment in the state in 1911. Due to his foreign birth, Eberhart often had to clarify that he was “in every sense an American and not a 'Swede' Governor.”

Eberhart lost his re-nomination bid for a fourth term. A second defeat in the 1916 U.S. Senate primary marked the end of his political career. After a career as a real estate and insurance executive in Chicago, he retired to a rest home, where he died of pneumonia on December 6, 1944, in Savage, Minnesota. He was buried in Lakewood Cemetery. An inventory of his gubernatorial records is maintained at the Minnesota Historical Society Library.

== See also ==
- List of United States governors born outside the United States

Party political offices
Preceded by Ray W. Jones	Republican nominee for Lieutenant Governor of Minnesota; 1906, 1908	Succeeded by Samuel Y. Gordon
Preceded by Jacob F. Jacobson	Republican nominee for Governor of Minnesota; 1910, 1912	Succeeded by William E. Lee
Political offices
Preceded by Ray W. Jones	Lieutenant Governor of Minnesota; 1907 – 1909	Succeeded by Edward Everett Smith
Preceded by John Albert Johnson	Governor of Minnesota; 1909 – 1915	Succeeded by Winfield Scott Hammond
