= Winfield Scott Hammond =

American politician (1863–1915)

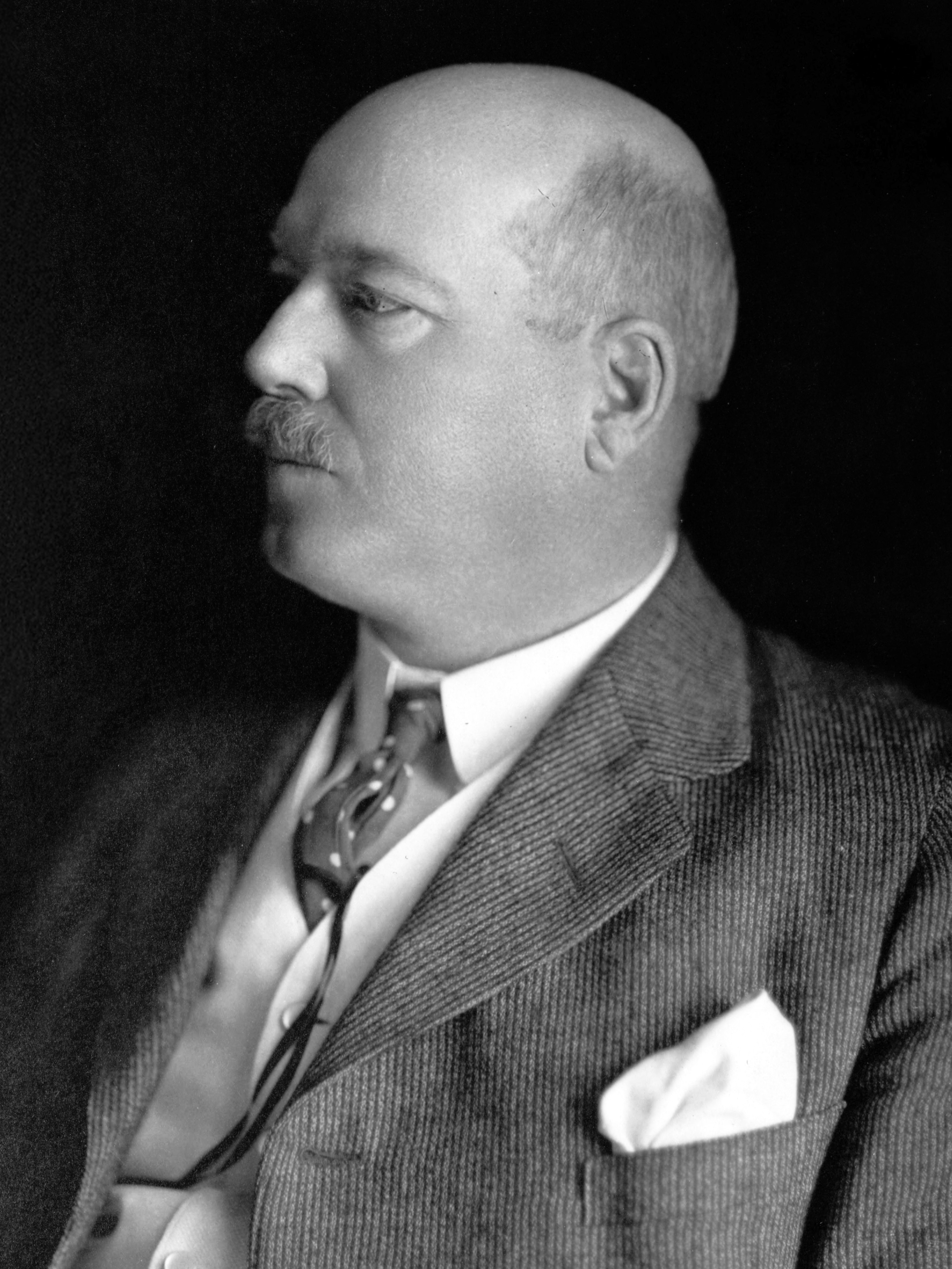

18th Governor of Minnesota
- In office January 5, 1915 – December 30, 1915
- Lieutenant: Joseph A. A. Burnquist
- Preceded by: Adolph Olson Eberhart
- Succeeded by: Joseph A. A. Burnquist

Member of the U.S. House of Representatives from Minnesota's 2nd district
- In office March 4, 1907 – January 6, 1915
- Preceded by: James McCleary
- Succeeded by: Franklin Ellsworth

Personal details
- Born: November 17, 1863 Southborough, Massachusetts, U.S.
- Died: December 30, 1915 (aged 52) Clinton, Louisiana, U.S.
- Party: Democratic
- Profession: Educator, politician

Winfield Scott Hammond (November 17, 1863 – December 30, 1915) was an American politician. He was a member of the Democratic Party. He was the last governor from Minnesota to have been a member of the Minnesota Democratic Party before it merged with the Farmer-Labor Party to form the Minnesota Democratic–Farmer–Labor Party.

== Biography ==
Hammond was born in 1863 in Southborough, Massachusetts, the son of Ellen P. (Panton) and John Washington Hammond. His mother was born in England. He served from Minnesota in the United States House of Representatives in the 60th, 61st, 62nd, and 63rd congresses from March 4, 1907, to January 6, 1915. He was the 18th governor of Minnesota from January 5, 1915, until his death on December 30, 1915. Hammond is just one of five Minnesota Democrats to win a gubernatorial election with a Democrat in the White House. He was the second governor of Minnesota to die in office. Joseph Alfred Arner Burnquist succeeded him to the governorship to fill the vacancy left by Hammond's death.

Minnesota's eighteenth governor had little time to effect significant change before he died in office. Had he lived longer, perhaps Hammond would have realized his ambitious plans to reorganize state government by minimizing bureaucracy and eliminating waste to make Minnesota's wheels turn more efficiently. Instead, his most notable legislation was the "county option bill," a restriction on liquor sales that pleased prohibition advocates.

An inscription under Hammond's bust in the capitol describes him as "a scholar in politics". He earned bachelor's and master's degrees from Dartmouth College and, upon moving to Mankato at age 21, became principal of its high school. He later studied law while he supervised schools in Watonwan County. He made his permanent home in St. James, where he practiced law and established himself as a political contender.

A staunch Democrat in a Republican community, he lost his first bid for Congress in 1892, but perseverance and bipartisan support eventually brought him a congressional seat 14 years later. He interrupted his fourth consecutive term to leave Washington and run for governor.

== As Governor ==
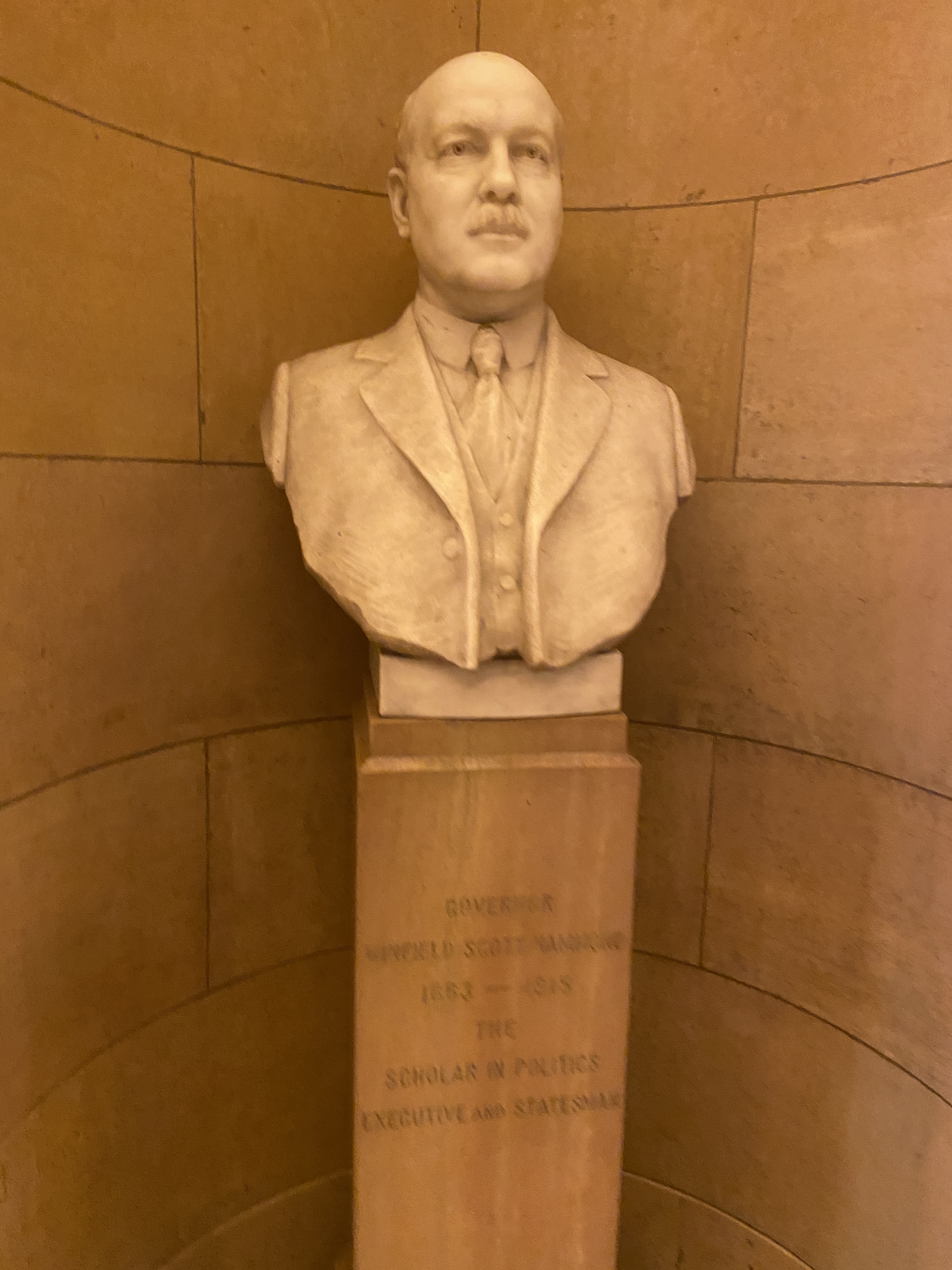
Bust of Winfield Scott Hammond, Minnesota State Capitol

Hammond was elected in the 1914 Minnesota gubernatorial election after defeating primary challenger Daniel W. Lawler, a conservative. Hammond received multiple endorsements, published on November 1, 1914. These include from President Woodrow Wilson, former Governor John Lind, and Secretary of State William Jennings Bryan.

Once elected, he was a speculated potential candidate for President. Hammond supported this sentiment, hoping to run once incumbent Woodrow Wilson was not running in 1920.

Hammond had been in office only eight months when he suffered ptomaine poisoning on a trip south and died of a stroke, aged 52, in Clinton, Louisiana on December 30, 1915.

In 1926, a bust of Hammond was erected in the Minnesota State Capitol, sculpted by Bryant Baker.

Party political offices
Preceded by Peter M. Ringdahl	Democratic nominee for Governor of Minnesota; 1914	Succeeded by Thomas P. Dwyer
Political offices
Preceded by Adolph Olson Eberhart	Governor of Minnesota; 1915	Succeeded by Joseph A. A. Burnquist
U.S. House of Representatives
Preceded by James McCleary	U.S. Representative from Minnesota's 2nd congressional district 1907 – 1915	Succeeded by Franklin Ellsworth
