= 1940 United States Senate election in Minnesota =

- November 5, 1940
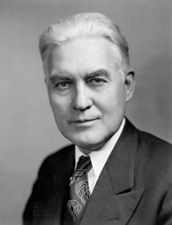

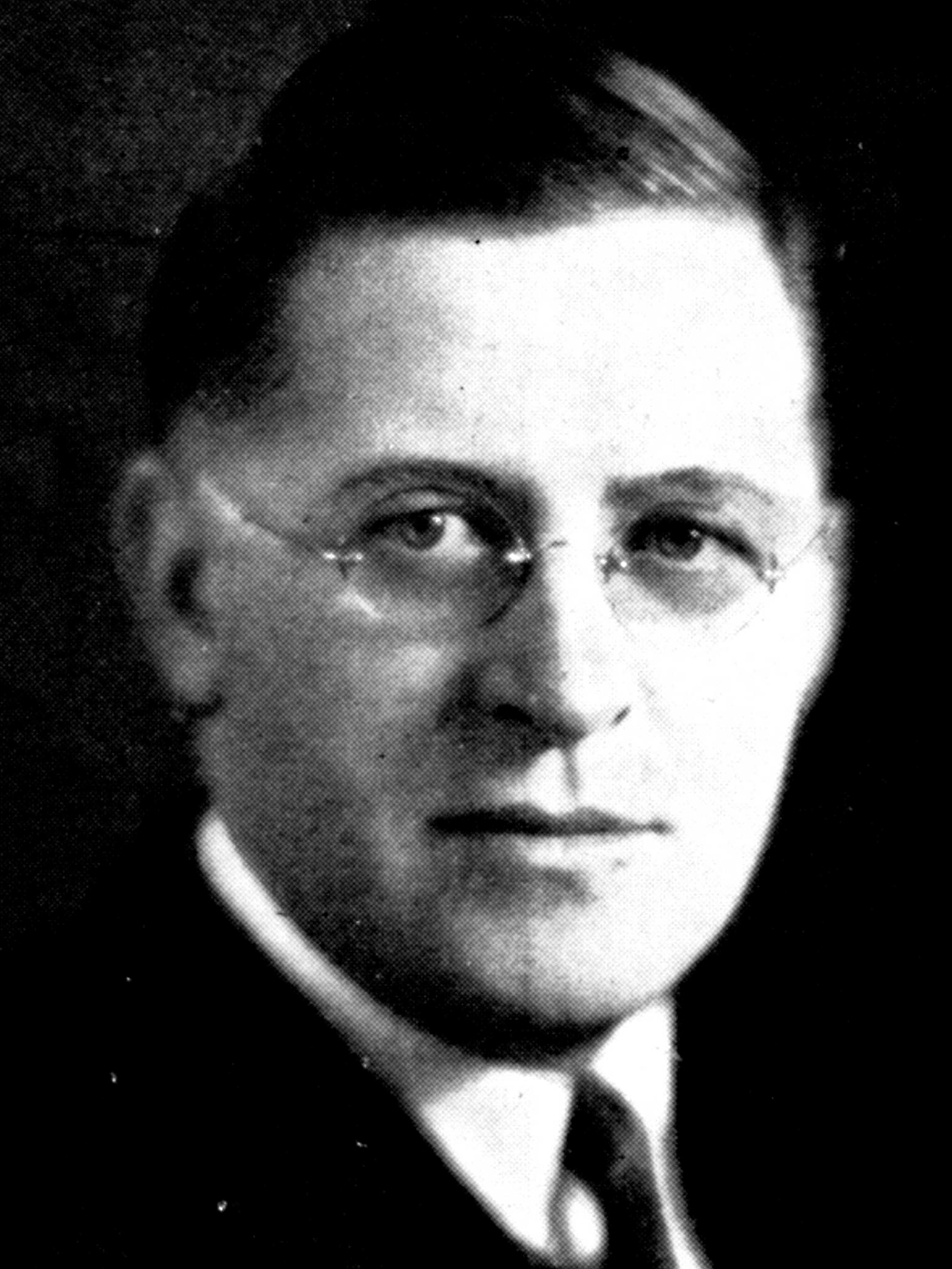

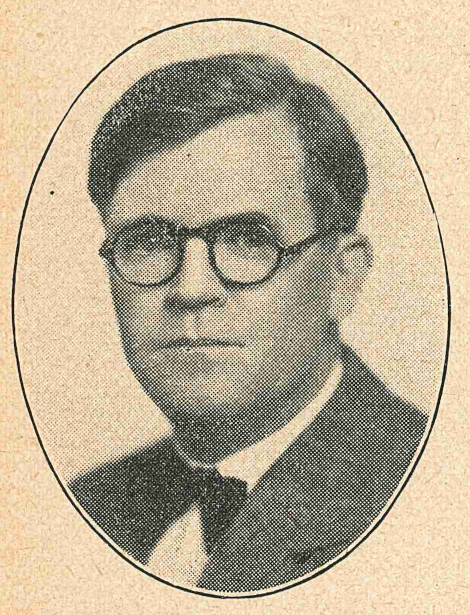
Nominee	Henrik Shipstead	Elmer A. Benson	John E. Regan
Party	Republican	Farmer–Labor	Democratic
Popular vote	641,049	310,875	248,658
Percentage	53.01%	25.71%	20.56%
- County results Shipstead: 30–40% 40–50% 50–60% 60–70% 70–80% Benson: 40–50%
U.S. senator before election
Henrik Shipstead
Farmer–Labor
Elected U.S. Senator
Henrik Shipstead
Republican

The 1940 United States Senate election in Minnesota took place on November 5, 1940. Incumbent U.S. Senator Henrik Shipstead defected to the Republican Party of Minnesota from the Farmer–Labor Party of Minnesota, and defeated former Governor Elmer Benson of the Farmer–Labor Party and John E. Regan of the Minnesota Democratic Party to win a fourth term.

== Democratic primary ==
=== Candidates ===
==== Declared ====
- Louis Erickson
- John E. O'Rourke, Former Minnesota State Representative from the 27th district (1935–1937)
- John E. Regan, 1932 and 1934 Democratic gubernatorial nominee and former Minnesota State Representative from the 8th district (1931–1933)
- Joseph Wolf

=== Results ===
Democratic primary election results
Party	Candidate	Votes	%
Democratic	John E. Regan	50,328	52.31%
Democratic	Joseph Wolf	20,759	21.58%
Democratic	Louis Erickson	13,966	14.52%
Democratic	John E. O'Rourke	11,154	11.59%
Total votes		96,207	100.00%

== Farmer–Labor primary ==
=== Candidates ===
==== Declared ====
- Elmer A. Benson, 24th Governor of Minnesota (1937–1939) and former U.S. Senator (1935–1936)
- George H. Lommen, Minnesota State Senator from the 61st district since 1927

=== Results ===
Farmer–Labor primary election results
Party	Candidate	Votes	%
Farmer–Labor	Elmer A. Benson	79,245	61.90%
Farmer–Labor	George H. Lommen	48,781	38.10%
Total votes		128,026	100.00%

== Republican primary ==
=== Candidates ===
==== Declared ====
- Ben Andreen
- Ray P. Chase, Former U.S. Representative (1933–1935) and 9th Minnesota State Auditor (1921–1931)
- Michael Ferch
- O. J. Hagen
- Asher Howard, Former Minnesota State Representative from the 34th district (1917–1923)
- Martin A. Nelson, 1934 and 1936 Republican gubernatorial nominee (unsuccessful)
- Henrik Shipstead, Incumbent U.S. Senator since 1923
- Engelberth Zeiner

=== Results ===
Republican primary election results
Party	Candidate	Votes	%
Republican	Henrik Shipstead (Incumbent)	168,876	51.37%
Republican	Martin A. Nelson	97,812	29.75%
Republican	Ray P. Chase	35,697	10.86%
Republican	Ben Andreen	13,858	4.22%
Republican	O. J. Hagen	5,810	1.77%
Republican	Asher Howard	3,313	1.01%
Republican	Michael Ferch	1,712	0.52%
Republican	Engelberth Zeiner	1,660	0.50%
Total votes		328,738	100.00%

== General election ==
=== Results ===
General election results
Party	Candidate	Votes	%
Republican	Henrik Shipstead (Incumbent)	641,049	53.01%
Farmer–Labor	Elmer A. Benson	310,875	25.71%
Democratic	John E. Regan	248,658	20.56%
Trotskyist Anti-War	Grace Holmes Carlson	8,761	0.72%
Independent	Carl Winter	256	0.02
Total votes		1,209,343	100.00%
Majority		330,174	27.30%
Republican gain from Farmer–Labor			

== See also ==
- United States Senate elections, 1940 and 1941
