= John E. Regan =

American politician (1883–1946)

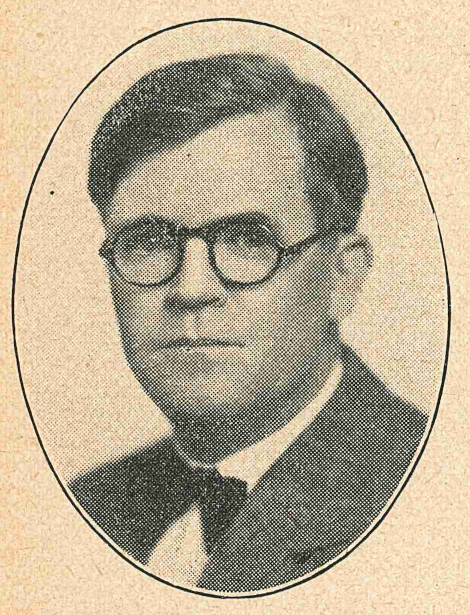
- Regan in 1931

Member of the Minnesota House of Representatives from the 8th district
- In office January 5, 1931 – January 1, 1933 Serving with Math Sanger
- Preceded by: C. H. G. Hazel
- Succeeded by: Lester Ulrich

Personal details
- Born: October 18, 1883 Mendota, Minnesota, U.S.
- Died: August 3, 1946 (aged 62) Mankato, Minnesota, U.S.
- Party: Democratic
- Spouse(s): Mary Martin (m. 1908–1930) Winifred Maley (m. 1933)
- Children: 6

John E. Regan Sr. (October 18, 1883 – August 3, 1946) was a United States politician from the state of Minnesota. He was the last leading figure of the Democratic Party of Minnesota from 1930 to 1944.

Regan was born in Mendota, Minnesota on October 18, 1883. He attended the St. Paul College of Law, and became an attorney. Regan moved to Balaton in 1908 and then to Mankato in 1910.

Regan entered politics by being elected to the Minnesota House of Representatives, for District 8 in 1930, serving from 1931 to 1933.

Regan ran for Governor of Minnesota against incumbent Floyd B. Olson twice. First in 1932, and again in 1934. Despite much of his party being favorable to the Farmer-Labor Party, Regan was much more of an economic conservative, and found himself at odds with the Farmer-Laborites and the progressives in his own party. Regan was the 'angry man' of the campaign, regularly attacking his opponents on the ballot and his enemies within his party. Regan was bitterly against Fusion.

Amid calls for him to drop out in 1932, Regan focused his campaign in defending his legitimacy as a serious candidate. He attacked Democrats who supported Olson, and referred specifically to the very pro-Olson Democrats of St. Paul as 'Soup Irish'. (Note: It is not clear what the phrase 'Soup Irish' means. It is possible it refers to Irish-Americans who do not work in industry, in contrast to Regan, who had experience working in industrial labor. This would be in reference to criticisms of Regan's labor policies.) Regan also berated Democratic politicians Edward Murphy and Tom E. Davis for a speech on the radio denouncing him as a serious candidate and endorsing Olson. Regan argued that if he truly was not a serious candidate, then the Olson campaign would not spend so much time and money trying to convince the public he wasn't.

In 1940, Regan ran for senate against incumbent Republican Henrik Shipstead and Farmer-Laborite Elmer Benson. Regan placed third.

Regan died on August 3, 1946, in Mankato, Minnesota.

== Electoral History ==
1932 Democratic Party of Minnesota primary results
Party	Candidate	Votes	%
Democratic	John E. Regan	50,105	50.95%
Democratic	Arthur Alexander Van Dyke	30,133	30.64%
Democratic	James Hegland	18,094	18.40%
Total votes		98,332	100%

1932 Minnesota gubernatorial election
Party	Candidate	Votes	%	±%
Farmer–Labor	Floyd B. Olson (incumbent)	522,438	50.57%	−8.76%
Republican	Earle Brown	334,081	32.34%	−3.97%
Democratic	John E. Regan	169,859	16.44%	+12.79%
Communist	William Schneiderman	4,807	0.47%	−0.24%
Industrial	John P. Johnson	1,824	0.18%	n/a
Majority		188,357	18.23%	
Turnout		1,033,009		
Farmer–Labor hold		Swing		

1934 Democratic gubernatorial primary
Party	Candidate	Votes	%
Democratic	John E. Regan	91,076	34.62%
Democratic	Fred Schilplin	68,649	26.10%
Democratic	Albert Pfaender	39,386	14.97%
Democratic	Oliver Skellet	24,923	9.47%
Democratic	Silas M. Bryan	16,539	6.29%
Democratic	Joseph J. Moriarty	9,239	3.51%
Democratic	James Hegland	7,733	2.94%
Democratic	Matthew F. Eusterman	5,504	2.09%
Total votes		263,049	100%

1932 Minnesota gubernatorial election
Party	Candidate	Votes	%	±%
Farmer–Labor	Floyd B. Olson (incumbent)	468,812	44.61%	−5.96%
Republican	Martin A. Nelson	396,359	37.72%	+5.38%
Democratic	John E. Regan	176,928	16.84%	+0.39%
Independent	Arthur C. Townley	4,454	0.42%	n/a
Communist	Samuel K. Davis	4,334	0.41%	−0.05%
Majority		72,453	6.89%	
Turnout		1,050,887		
Farmer–Labor hold		Swing		

1940 United States Senate election in Minnesota
Party	Candidate	Votes	%
Democratic	John E. Regan	50,328	52.31%
Democratic	Joseph Wolf	20,759	21.58%
Democratic	Louis Erickson	13,966	14.52%
Democratic	John E. O'Rourke	11,154	11.59%
Total votes		96,207	100.00%

1940 United States Senate election in Minnesota
Party	Candidate	Votes	%
Republican	Henrik Shipstead (Incumbent)	641,049	53.01%
Farmer–Labor	Elmer A. Benson	310,875	25.71%
Democratic	John E. Regan	248,658	20.56%
Trotskyist Anti-War	Grace Holmes Carlson	8,761	0.72%
Independent	Carl Winter	256	0.02
Total votes		1,209,343	100.00%
Majority		330,174	27.30%
Republican gain from Farmer–Labor			

== Notes ==
Party political offices
Preceded by Edward Indrehus	Democratic nominee for Governor of Minnesota; 1932, 1934	Succeeded by None (1936); Thomas F. Gallagher (1938)
