= 1942 Minnesota gubernatorial election =

- November 3, 1942
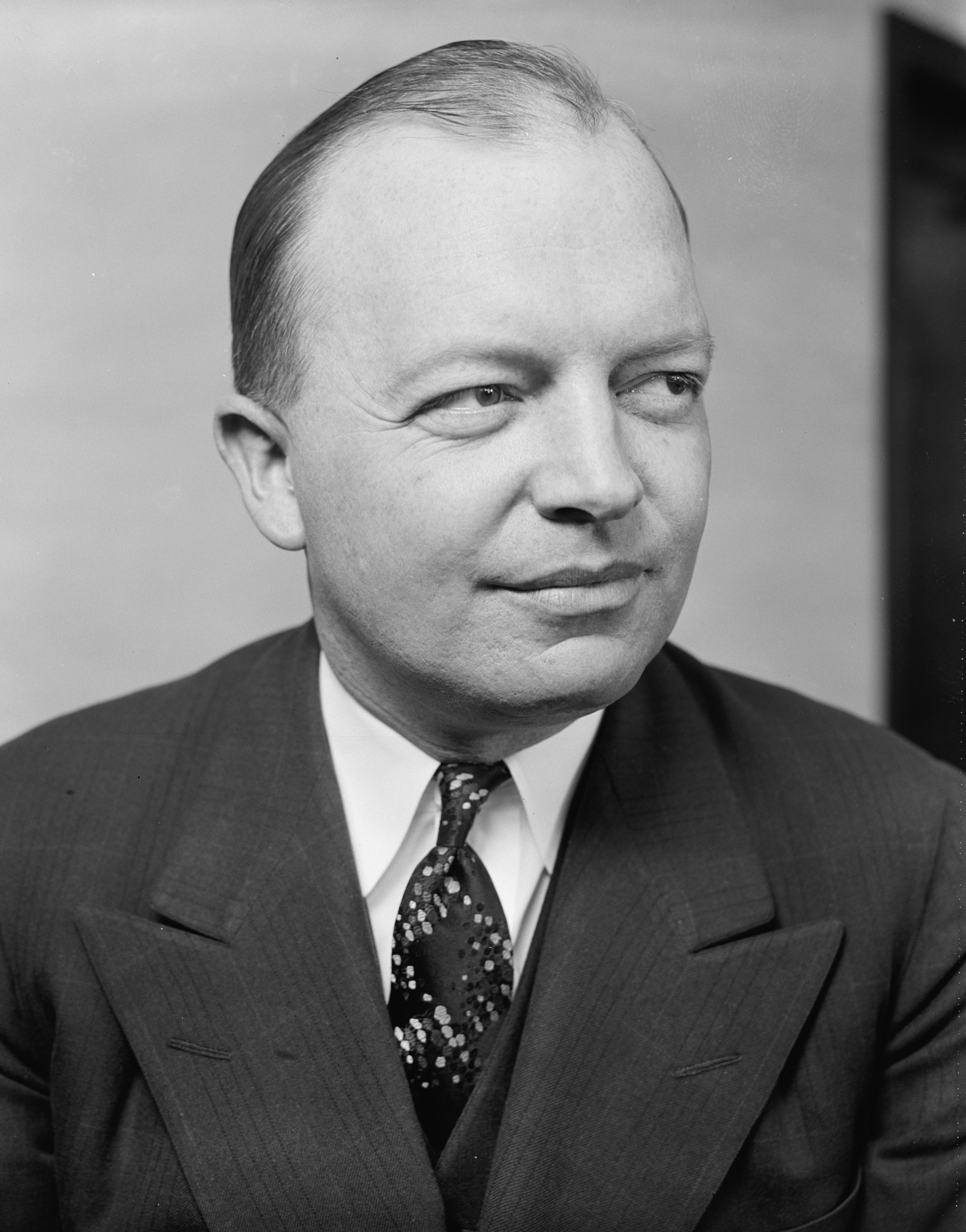

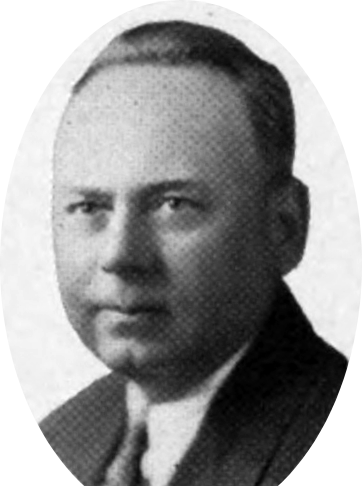

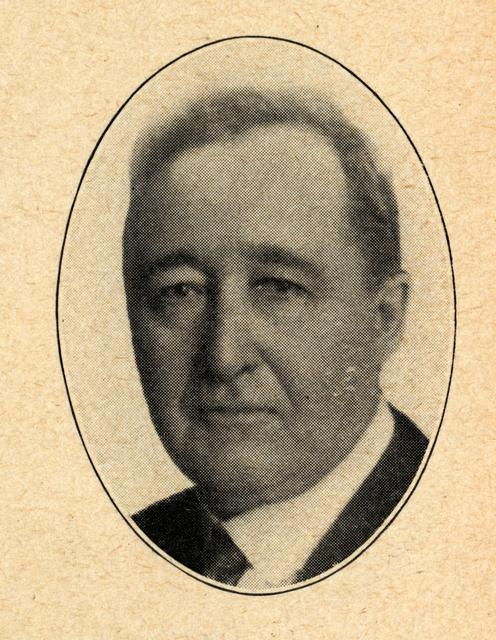
Nominee	Harold Stassen	Hjalmar Petersen	John D. Sullivan
Party	Republican	Farmer–Labor	Democratic
Popular vote	409,800	299,917	75,151
Percentage	51.60%	37.76%	9.46%
- County results Stassen: 40–50% 50–60% 60–70% 70–80% Peterson: 40–50% 50–60%
Governor before election
Harold Stassen
Republican
Elected Governor
Harold Stassen
Republican

The 1942 Minnesota gubernatorial election took place on November 3, 1942. Republican incumbent Harold Stassen defeated Farmer–Labor Party challenger Hjalmar Petersen. This was the last election in which the Democratic Party of Minnesota and the Farmer–Labor Party ran separate candidates; in 1944, both parties ran under the umbrella of the Minnesota Democratic–Farmer–Labor Party.

== Republican primary ==
Incumbent Harold Stassen faced primary opposition from two-time gubernatorial candidate Martin A. Nelson and Congressmember John G. Alexander.

=== Candidates ===
==== Nominated ====
- Harold Stassen, incumbent

=== Eliminated in primary ===
- John G. Alexander, former congressman for MN-03
- Martin A. Nelson, attorney and Republican gubernatorial candidate in 1934 and 1936

=== Results ===
Farmer-Labor Party of Minnesota primary results
Party	Candidate	Votes	%
Republican	Harold Stassen	218,457	53.31%
Republican	Martin A. Nelson	142,465	34.77%
Republican	John G. Alexander	48,865	11.92%
Total votes		409,787	100%

== Farmer-Labor primary ==
The Farmer-Labor primary election was won by former governor Hjalmar Petersen, who was running a second time to re-take his former position as governor.

=== Candidates ===
==== Nominated ====
- Hjalmar Petersen, former governor

=== Eliminated in primary ===
- Edgar Bernard, darmer, Republican primary candidate in 1934, and Farmer-Labor primary candidate in 1936 and 1940
- Paul A. Rasmussen, former state budget commissioner

=== Results ===
Farmer-Labor Party of Minnesota primary results
Party	Candidate	Votes	%
Farmer–Labor	Hjalmar Petersen	66,405	58.05%
Farmer–Labor	Paul A. Rasmussen	39,362	34.41%
Farmer–Labor	Edgar Bernard	8,627	7.54%
Total votes		114,394	100%

== Candidates ==
- Harris A. Brandborg, farmer (Industrial Government)
- Martin Mackie, labor organizer (Communist)
- Hjalmar Petersen, former governor (Farmer-Labor)
- Harold Stassen, incumbent (Republican)
- John D. Sullivan, attorney (Democrat)

== Campaigns ==
Stassen campaigned on expanding social welfare, notably old age pension, stating, "We will not make extravagant promises to our aged folks in a demagogic attempt to get votes, but we will steadily improve the old age assistance and we will administer it without favoritism for political views or race, or creeds or color."

Petersen criticized Stassen's 27.5% tax cut on mining companies, claiming that this lost the state approximately $3,000,000 in revenue. Sullivan, running on a similar platform, sent a letter to Petersen and the Farmer-Labor party office proposing that Petersen should drop out and a Fusion ticket should be created. Party Secretary Viena P. Johnson responded with a letter only acknowledging that the proposal had been received. Petersen and Sullivan broke mainly on the issue of war, with Petersen an isolationist and Sullivan a pro-war candidate.

Stassen was the "recommended candidate" chosen by the CIO. The CIO generally opposed Stassen's labor policies, but believed that due to the ongoing Second World War, Stassen's policies would best allow for Minnesota to contribute to the war effort. The CIO vice president went on to accuse Petersen of advocating for negotiating for peace with Adolf Hitler.

Petersen criticized Stassen as not caring for the farmers of the state, saying that wheat and grain priced were now about half of what they were in 1918, and citing Stassen's lack of concern for struggling farmers.

== Results ==
1942 gubernatorial election, Minnesota
Party	Candidate	Votes	%	±%
Republican	Harold Stassen (incumbent)	409,800	51.60%	−0.47%
Farmer–Labor	Hjalmar Petersen	299,917	37.76%	+1.21%
Democratic	John D. Sullivan	75,151	9.46%	−1.67%
Communist	Martin Mackie	5,082	0.64%	n/a
Industrial Government	Harris A. Brandborg	4,278	0.53%	n/a
Majority		109,883	13.84%	
Turnout		794,228		
Republican hold		Swing		

== See also ==
- List of Minnesota gubernatorial elections
