= Fred A. Curtis =

Member of the Minnesota House of Representatives from the 20th district
- In office January 2, 1933 – January 6, 1935
- Preceded by: Louis E. Berg
- Succeeded by: R. H. Forsythe

Personal details
- Born: July 4, 1899 Stillwater Township, Minnesota
- Died: April 11, 1972 (aged 72) South St. Paul, Minnesota
- Party: Democratic
- Spouse: Orane Marcelline O'Shaughnessy
- Children: 1
- Education: University of Minnesota; St. Paul College of Law

Frederick A. Curtis ( July 4, 1899 – April 11, 1972) was a U.S. politician from Minnesota.

Curtis served in World War I. After the war, be became the principal of South St. Paul High School. Following his time there, Curtis became an attorney.

Curtis was elected to the Minnesota House of Representatives in 1932 as a Democrat. He lost re-election in 1934. In 1936, he was nominated for governor of Minnesota by the Democratic party. However, Curtis dropped out of the race as part of an informal deal between the Minnesota Farmer-Labor Party and the New Deal Coalition to support Elmer Benson in the gubernatorial election.

In 1940, Curtis ran for MN-2, but lost the primary to Elmer J. Ryan.

Party political offices
Preceded by John E. Regan	Democratic nominee for Governor of Minnesota; 1936 (dropped out)	Succeeded by Thomas F. Gallagher
