= Frederick Curtis =

Frederick Curtis may refer to:

- Frederick Kingsbury Curtis, American lawyer and director of the Ann Arbor Railroad
- Frederick Francis Charles Curtis, first chief architect for British Railways
- Fred Curtis (baseball) (Frederick Maroin Curtis, 1880–1939)), Major League Baseball first baseman
- Fred A. Curtis (Frederick A. Curtis, 1899–1972), American politician from Minnesota
