= 1942 United States Senate election in Minnesota =

- November 3, 1942
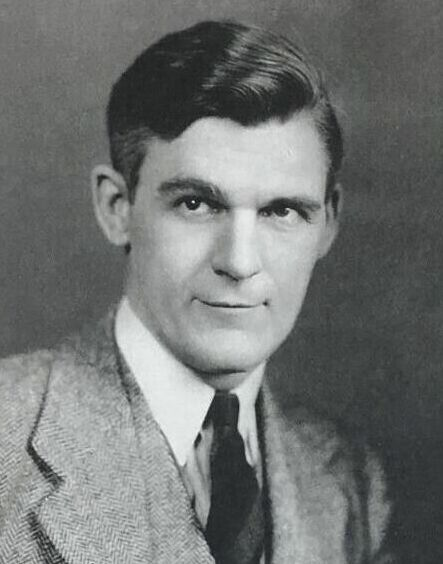

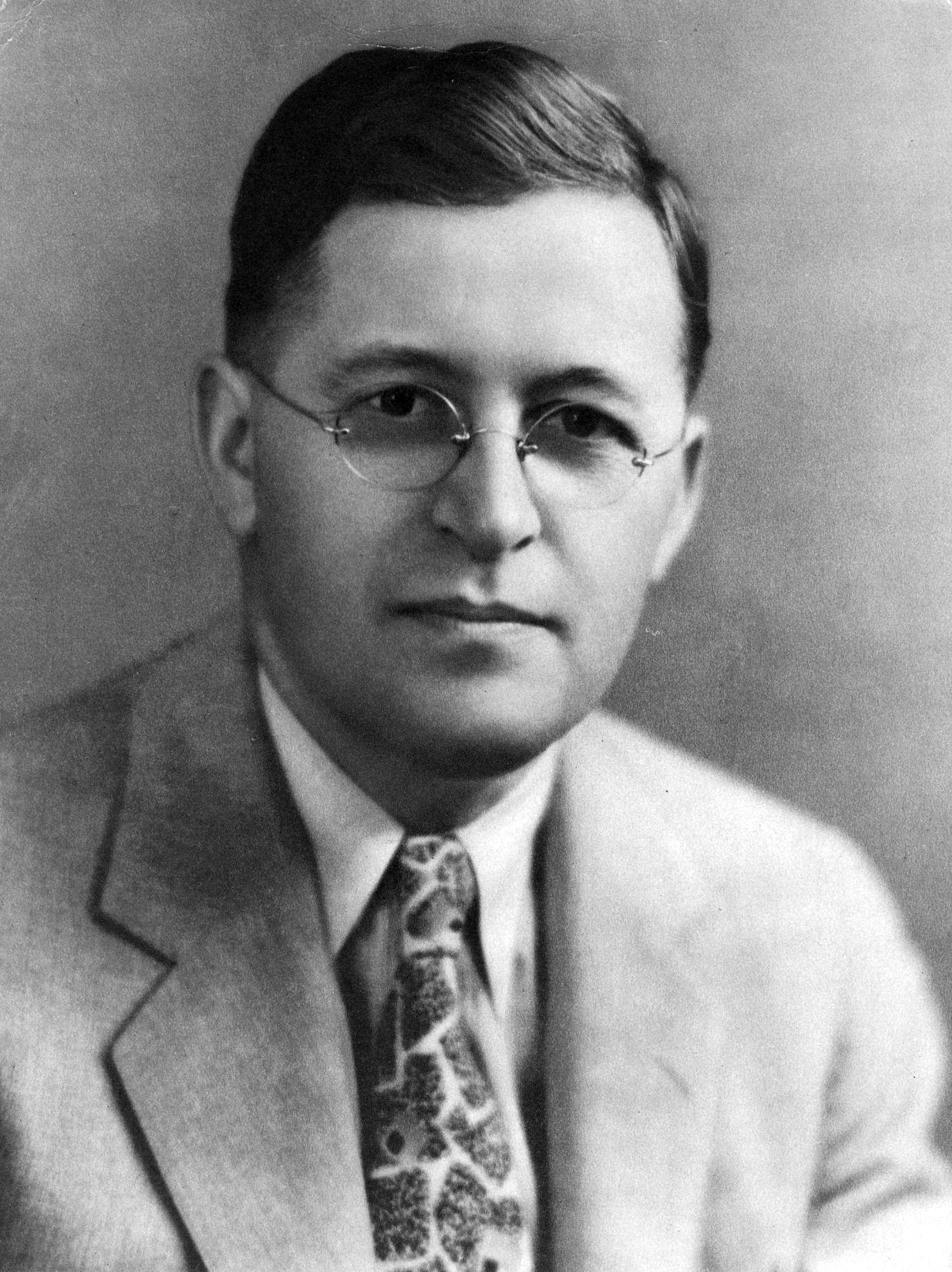

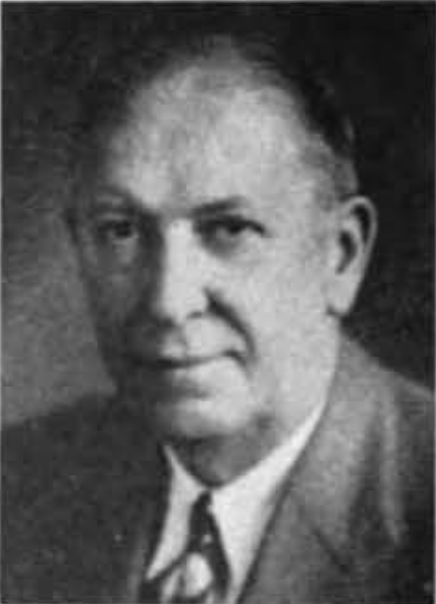

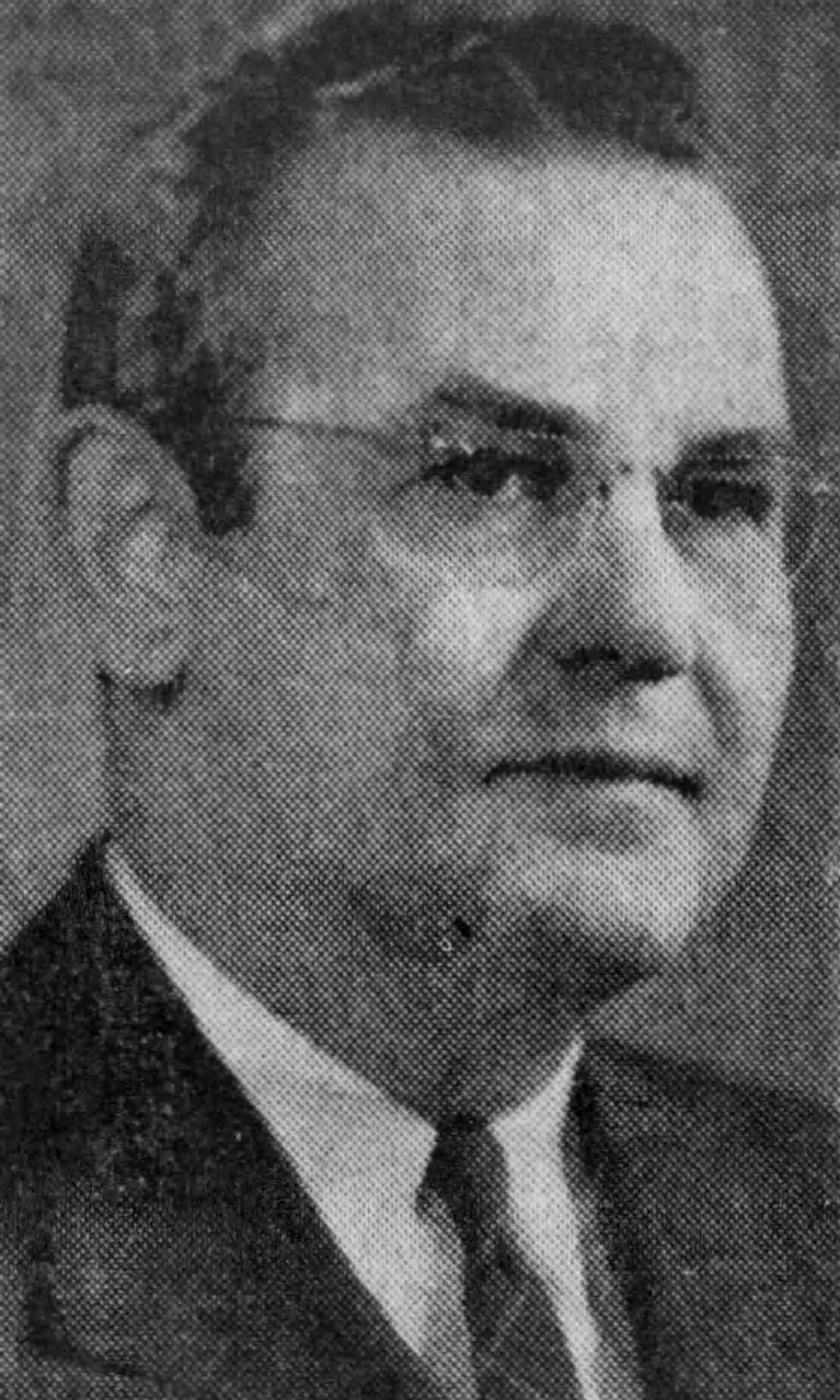
| Nominee | Joseph H. Ball | Elmer A. Benson |
| Party | Republican | Farmer–Labor |
| Popular vote | 356,297 | 213,965 |
| Percentage | 46.98% | 28.21% |
| Nominee | Martin A. Nelson | Ed Murphy |
| Party | Independent | Democratic |
| Popular vote | 109,226 | 78,959 |
| Percentage | 14.40% | 10.41% |
- County results Ball: 30–40% 40–50% 50–60% 60–70% Benson: 40–50% 50–60% Nelson: 30–40% 40–50%
U.S. senator before election
Joseph H. Ball
Republican
Elected U.S. Senator
Joseph H. Ball
Republican

The 1942 United States Senate election in Minnesota took place on November 3, 1942. Incumbent Republican Joseph H. Ball, who had been temporarily appointed by Governor Harold Stassen in 1940 to fill the seat of the deceased Farmer–Labor U.S. Senator Ernest Lundeen, defeated Farmer–Labor former U.S. Senator and former Governor Elmer Benson, independent candidate Martin A. Nelson, and Democratic nominee Ed Murphy, to win election to the full six-year term beginning in January 1943. A special election held on the same date elected Republican nominee Arthur E. Nelson to serve the remainder of Lundeen's unexpired term.

Following his 1940 appointment and subsequent election, Ball ultimately served the longest tenure of any Senator only elected once.

== Farmer–Labor primary ==
=== Candidates ===
==== Declared ====
- Henry Arens, Former U.S. Representative (1933–1935) and 26th Lieutenant Governor of Minnesota (1931–1933)
- Elmer A. Benson, 24th Governor of Minnesota (1937–1939) and former U.S. Senator (1935–1936)
- Norma Ward Lundeen (named "Mrs. Ernest Lundeen" on the ballot), widow of Ernest Lundeen
- Herbert L. Millington

=== Results ===
Farmer–Labor primary election results
| Party | Candidate | Votes | % |
|---|---|---|---|
| Farmer–Labor | Elmer A. Benson | 66,051 | 59.14% |
| Farmer–Labor | Mrs. Ernest Lundeen | 24,019 | 21.50% |
| Farmer–Labor | Henry Arens | 17,163 | 15.37% |
| Farmer–Labor | Herbert L. Millington | 4,453 | 3.99% |
| Total votes | | 111,686 | 100.00% |

== Republican primary ==
=== Candidates ===
==== Declared ====
- Joseph H. Ball, Incumbent U.S. Senator since 1940
- Walter K. Mickelson, New Ulm-area publisher
- Harson A. Northrop
- Henry J. Soltau, Methodist pastor and ardent prohibitionist

=== Results ===
Republican primary election results
| Party | Candidate | Votes | % |
|---|---|---|---|
| Republican | Joseph H. Ball (Incumbent) | 198,733 | 51.93% |
| Republican | Walter K. Mickelson | 111,834 | 29.22% |
| Republican | Henry J. Soltau | 53,138 | 13.88% |
| Republican | Harson A. Northrop | 19,027 | 4.97% |
| Total votes | | 382,732 | 100.00% |

== General election ==
=== Results ===
General election results
| Party | Candidate | Votes | % |
|---|---|---|---|
| Republican | Joseph H. Ball (Incumbent) | 356,297 | 46.98% |
| Farmer–Labor | Elmer A. Benson | 213,965 | 28.21% |
| Independent | Martin A. Nelson | 109,226 | 14.40% |
| Democratic | Ed Murphy | 78,959 | 10.41% |
| Total votes | | 758,447 | 100.00% |
| Majority | | 142,332 | 18.77% |
| Republican hold | | | |

== See also ==
- United States Senate elections, 1942
