= 1936 Minnesota gubernatorial election =

- November 3, 1936
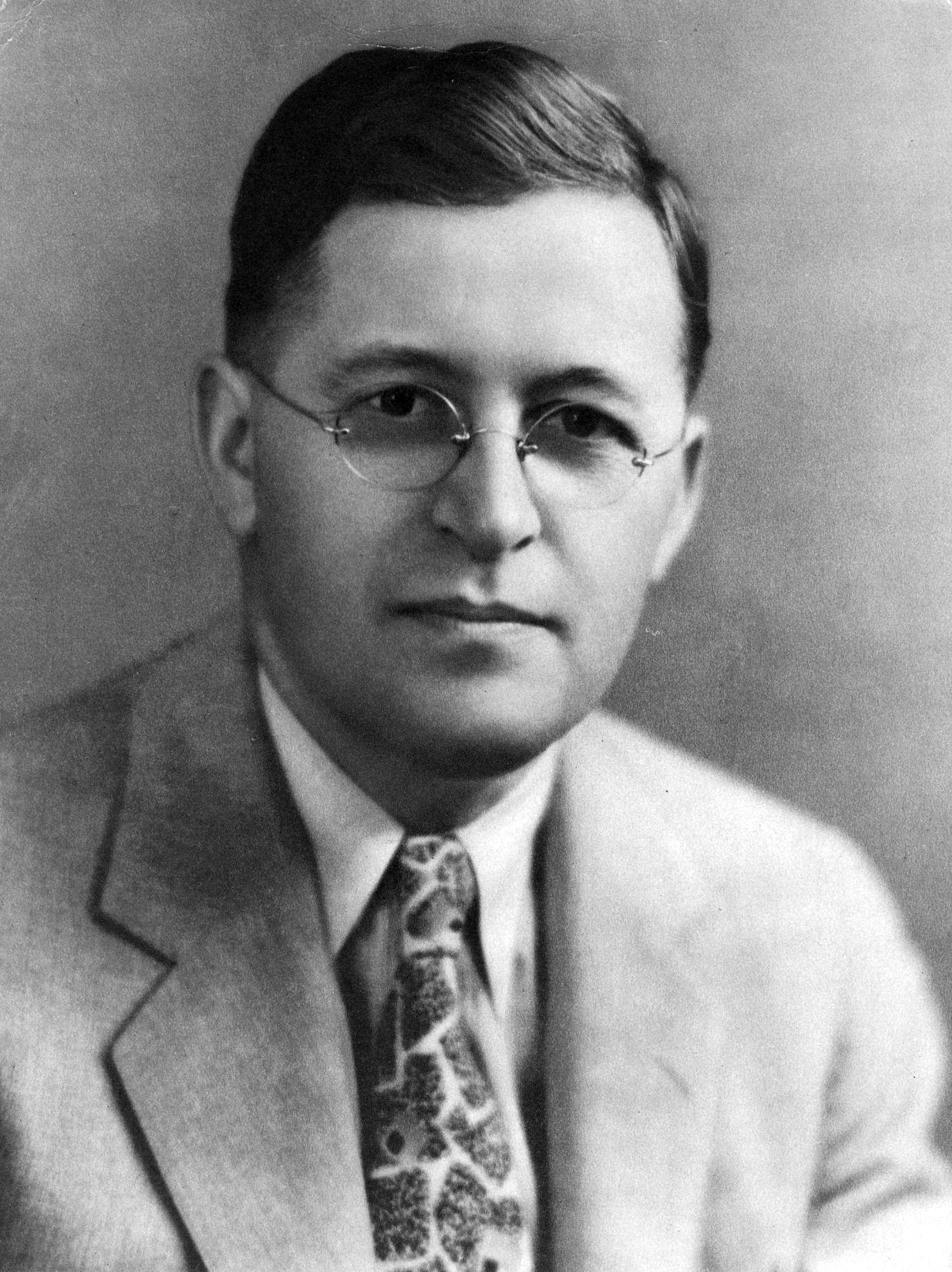

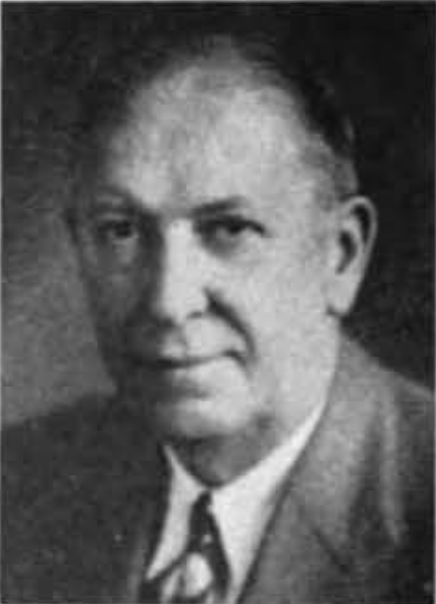
Nominee	Elmer Austin Benson	Martin A. Nelson
Party	Farmer–Labor	Republican
Alliance	Democratic
Popular vote	680,342	431,841
Percentage	60.74%	38.55%
- County results Benson: 40–50% 50–60% 60–70% 70–80% Nelson 40–50% 50–60%
Governor before election
Hjalmar Petersen
Farmer–Labor
Elected Governor
Elmer Austin Benson
Farmer–Labor

The 1936 Minnesota gubernatorial election took place on November 3, 1936. Farmer-Labor candidate Elmer Austin Benson defeated Republican challenger Martin A. Nelson. The Democratic candidate withdrew and endorsed Benson.

Farmer-Laborite Floyd B. Olson had won the previous three elections. Olson would die in office on August 22, 1936. Lieutenant Governor Hjalmar Petersen would succeed him, and did not run for a term in his own right in this election.

== Farmer-Labor primary ==
The Farmer-Labor primary election was held on June 15, 1936, before Olson was even hospitalized. Olson was not seeking a fourth term due to ambitions to run for the Senate.

=== Candidates ===
==== Nominated ====
- Elmer Benson, senator and former state commissioner of banks

=== Eliminated in primary ===
- Edgar Bernard, farmer
- Magnus Johnson, former senator and Farmer-Labor gubernatorial candidate in 1922 and 1926
- Adolph W. Olson, dried goods salesman

=== Results ===
Farmer-Labor Party of Minnesota primary results
Party	Candidate	Votes	%
Farmer–Labor	Elmer Benson	126,088	66.14%
Farmer–Labor	Magnus Johnson	50,503	26.49%
Farmer–Labor	Edgar Bernard	7,901	4.14%
Farmer–Labor	Adolph W. Olson	6,156	3.23%
Total votes		190,648	100%

== Republican primary ==
The Republican primary was held on June 15, 1936. Martin A. Nelson won the primary for a second time. The primary was a rematch between the two top-finishing candidates in the 1934 Republican gubernatorial primary.

=== Candidates ===
==== Nominated ====
- Martin A. Nelson, attorney and Republican gubernatorial candidate in 1934

=== Eliminated in primary ===
- Arthur B. Gilbert, president of the Recovery League of Minnesota

=== Results ===
Farmer-Labor Party of Minnesota primary results
Party	Candidate	Votes	%
Republican	Martin A. Nelson	174,586	86.42%
Republican	Arthur B. Gilbert	17,536	13.5%
Total votes		202,011	100%

== Democratic primary ==
The Democratic primary was held on June 15, 1936. Fred A. Curtis won the primary election. Following the primary, Novak's campaign manager, William Fitzharris, sued Curtis, alleging he had violated the Minnesota Corrupt Practices Act. Instead of taking the suit to court, Curtis withdrew and endorsed Farmer-Labor nominee Elmer Benson.

=== Candidates ===
==== Nominated ====
- Fred A. Curtis, attorney and former member of the Minnesota House of Representatives

=== Eliminated in primary ===
- Edward E. Novak, physician

=== Results ===
Farmer-Labor Party of Minnesota primary results
Party	Candidate	Votes	%
Democratic	Fred A. Curtis	66,324	53.31%
Democratic	Edward E. Novak	58,080	46.69%
Total votes		124,404	100%

== Candidates ==
- Elmer Benson, senator (Farmer-Labor)
- Earl Stewart, machinist (Industrial)
- Martin A. Nelson, attorney and Republican gubernatorial candidate in 1934 (Republican)

== Campaigns ==
Benson launched his campaign on September 21, 1936, in Appleton, Minnesota. He argued in his keynote address against the Republican plan to pass a constitutional amendment banning property tax and increasing sales tax. He argued that the state should instead deliver tax relief through a raised income tax on the rich, inheritance tax, and various forms of higher corporate tax. His address was so well attended, the 2000 seats in the county armory were filled, as was all standing room, and 3000 people gathered in a nearby park to listen to the broadcast. Benson found it difficult to deliver the speech due to the amount of applause received.

On October 9, 1936, Franklin D. Roosevelt delivered an address at the Minnesota State Capitol in which he endorsed Benson for governor. Benson called Roosevelt "...A man who has done more for industrial workers, small business men and farmers than any other man in this generation". Benson, like previous Farmer-Laborite candidates, faced regular accusations of communism. Specifically, he was accused of being a supporter of Earl Browder. Benson stated that these accusations were created to distract from real issues. He chose not to treat these claims as serious, and mostly ignored them.

== Results ==
1936 gubernatorial election, Minnesota
Party	Candidate	Votes	%	±%
Farmer–Labor	Elmer Austin Benson	680,342	60.74%	+16.12%
Republican	Martin A. Nelson	431,841	38.55%	+0.83%
Industrial	Earl Stewart	7,996	0.71%	n/a
Majority		248,501	22.18%	
Turnout		1,120,179		
Farmer–Labor hold		Swing		

== See also ==
- List of Minnesota gubernatorial elections
