= 1930 Minnesota gubernatorial election =

- November 4, 1930
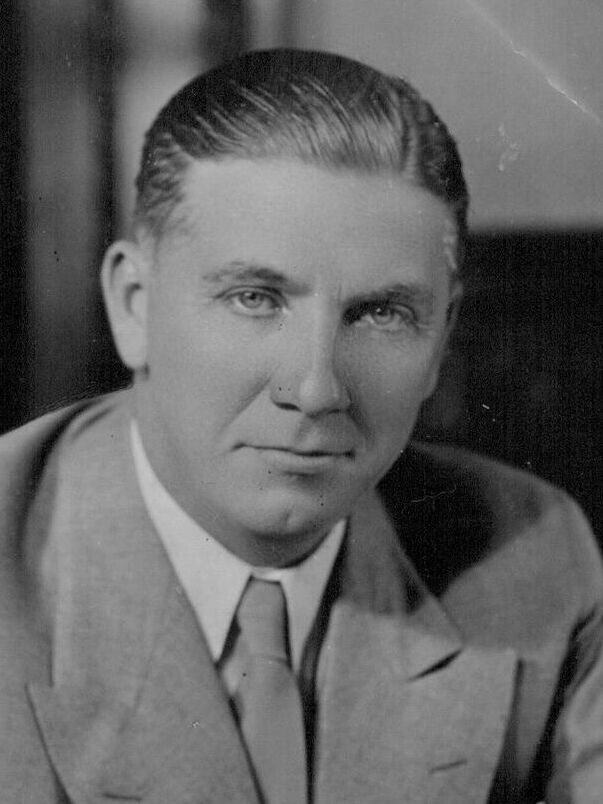

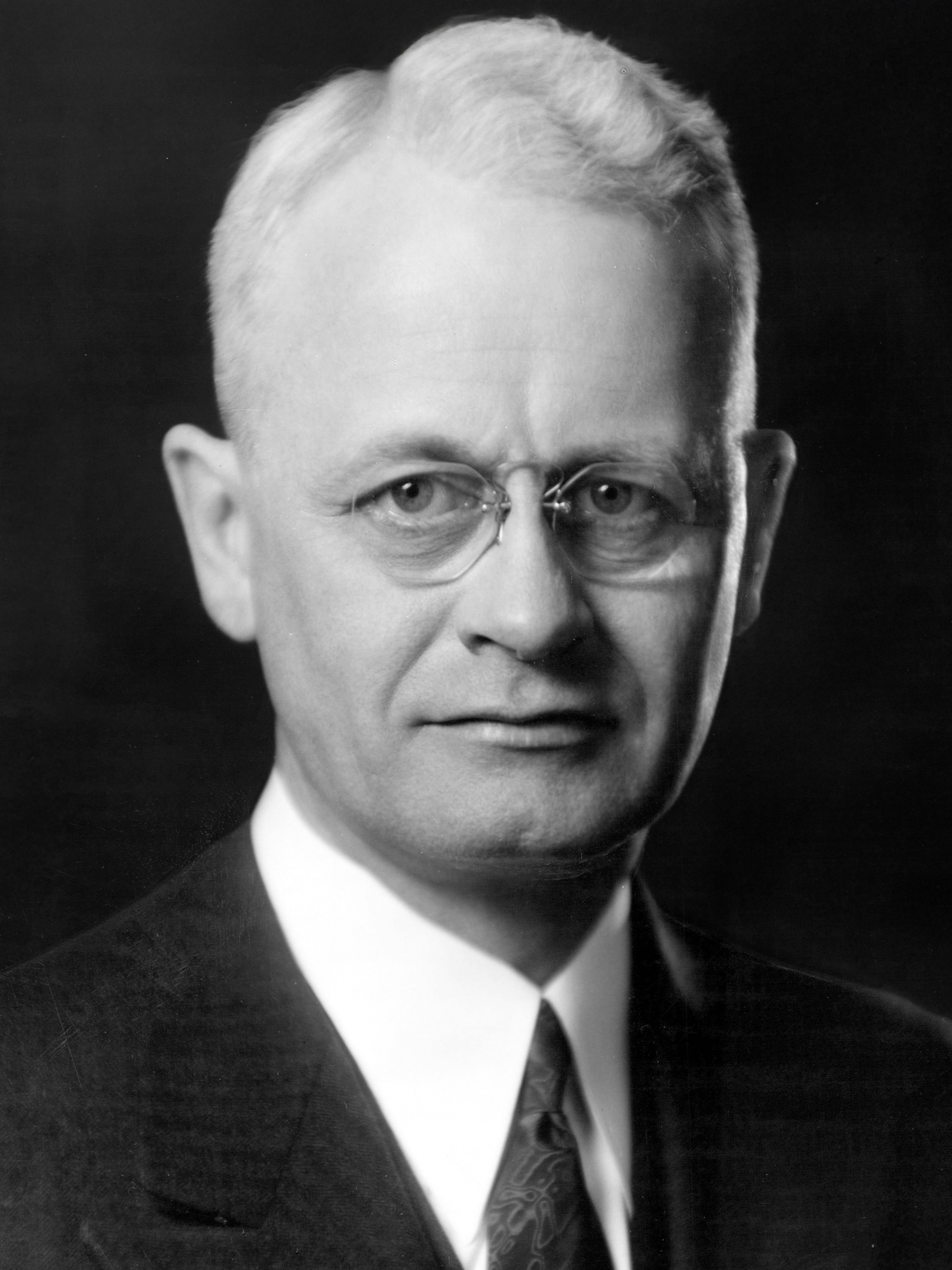
Nominee	Floyd B. Olson	Ray P. Chase
Party	Farmer–Labor	Republican
Popular vote	473,154	289,528
Percentage	59.34%	36.31%
- Olson: 30–40% 40–50% 50–60% 60–70% 70–80% 80–90% >90% Chase: 30–40% 40–50% 50–60% 60–70% 70–80% 80–90% Indrehus: 30–40% Reeve: 40–50% 50–60% Tie: 30–40% 40–50% 50% No data
Governor before election
Theodore Christianson
Republican
Elected Governor
Floyd B. Olson
Farmer–Labor

The 1930 Minnesota gubernatorial election took place on November 4, 1930. It was the first gubernatorial race to start in Minnesota since the beginning of the Great Depression, which contributed to the meteoric rise of the Farmer–Labor Party in the state. Farmer–Labor Party candidate Floyd B. Olson decisively defeated Republican Party of Minnesota challenger Raymond P. Chase.

== Republican primary ==
With no incumbent, the Republican primary was crowded with candidates. Raymond P. Chase was the nominee. The primary election was held on June 16, 1930.

=== Candidates ===
==== Nominated ====
- Raymond P. Chase, Minnesota state auditor

=== Eliminated in Primary ===
- Joseph A.A. Burnquist, former governor of Minnesota
- Paul F. Dehnel, newspaper publisher
- Nathaniel J. Holmberg, former Minnesota senator
- Eivind Klaveness, former head of the Moderation League of Minnesota
- Albert Lagerstedt, member of the Minnesota House of Representatives

=== Results ===
Farmer-Labor Party of Minnesota primary results
Party	Candidate	Votes	%
Republican	Raymond P. Chase	201,234	45.81%
Republican	Joseph A.A. Burnquist	114,473	26.06%
Republican	Nathaniel J. Holmberg	82,669	18.82%
Republican	Albert Lagerstedt	17,389	3.96%
Republican	Paul F. Dehnel	13,746	3.13%
Republican	Eivind Klaveness	9,769	2.22%
Total votes		439,280	100%

== Farmer-Labor primary ==
Floyd B. Olson embarked on his second gubernatorial run, facing challenger Carl E. Taylor. Olson won in a landslide.

=== Candidates ===
==== Nominated ====
- Floyd B. Olson, county attorney of Hennepin County

=== Eliminated in primary ===
- Carl E. Taylor, court commissioner of Aitkin County

=== Results ===
Farmer-Labor Party of Minnesota primary results
Party	Candidate	Votes	%
Farmer–Labor	Floyd B. Olson	60,455	83.68%
Farmer–Labor	Carl E. Taylor	11,791	16.32%
Total votes		72,246	100%

== Candidates ==
- Raymond P. Chase, Minnesota state auditor
- Edward Indrehus, former member of the Minnesota House of Representatives
- Karl Reeve, candidate for mayor of St. Paul
- Floyd B. Olson, county attorney of Hennepin County

== Campaigns ==
Olson campaigned on a number of progressive reforms. One of these was old-age pension, which would become Social Security. For this policy, he collaborated with the Women's Welfare League. Olson opposed the creation of new departments of law enforcement, instead arguing for expanded powers and usage of pre-existing organizations. The one exception was a proposal for a board of parole, a criminal investigation organization independent from the police and prison systems. The plan was widely supported, and was endorsed by the Minneapolis Police Department, and judges Oscar Hallam and John Meighen.

Olson was careful in his campaign to attack the Republican Party, but not Republicans themselves. He argued that the party itself was under the control of special interest groups and was no longer serving its base. Olson thus found much success among Republicans.

A cause of contention between the two candidates was on the policy of reforestation. In 1926, Article X, Section 2 of the Minnesota Constitution was passed by the public to allow for the state government to enforce reforestation laws. Olson argued that the state government had taken little action with these new powers, and that all that had been done was to create an illusion on paper that action was being taken. Chase refuted this, stating that these claims were proof that the Farmer-Labor party had been "taken over" by Minneapolis politicians with no understanding of the ongoing in the north of the state. Chase went on to state that the Republican party's success in agricultural and industrial policy should be a larger focus instead.

Chase made a point in his campaign to receive no party funding. Instead, his campaign was financed entirely from donations individuals. Olson disputed that this was true, which Chase called "gross ignorance".

Chase ended his campaign the day before election day with a final address to the Ramsey County Women's Republican Club.

== Results ==
1930 gubernatorial election, Minnesota
Party	Candidate	Votes	%	±%
Farmer–Labor	Floyd B. Olson	473,154	59.34%	+36.61%
Republican	Raymond P. Chase	289,528	36.31%	−18.67%
Democratic	Edward Indrehus	29,109	3.65%	−17.73%
Communist	Karl Reeve	5,594	0.70%	n/a
Majority		183,626	23.03%	
Turnout		797,385		
Farmer–Labor gain from Republican		Swing		

== See also ==
- List of Minnesota gubernatorial elections
