= Albert Pfaender =

Major Albert Pfaender
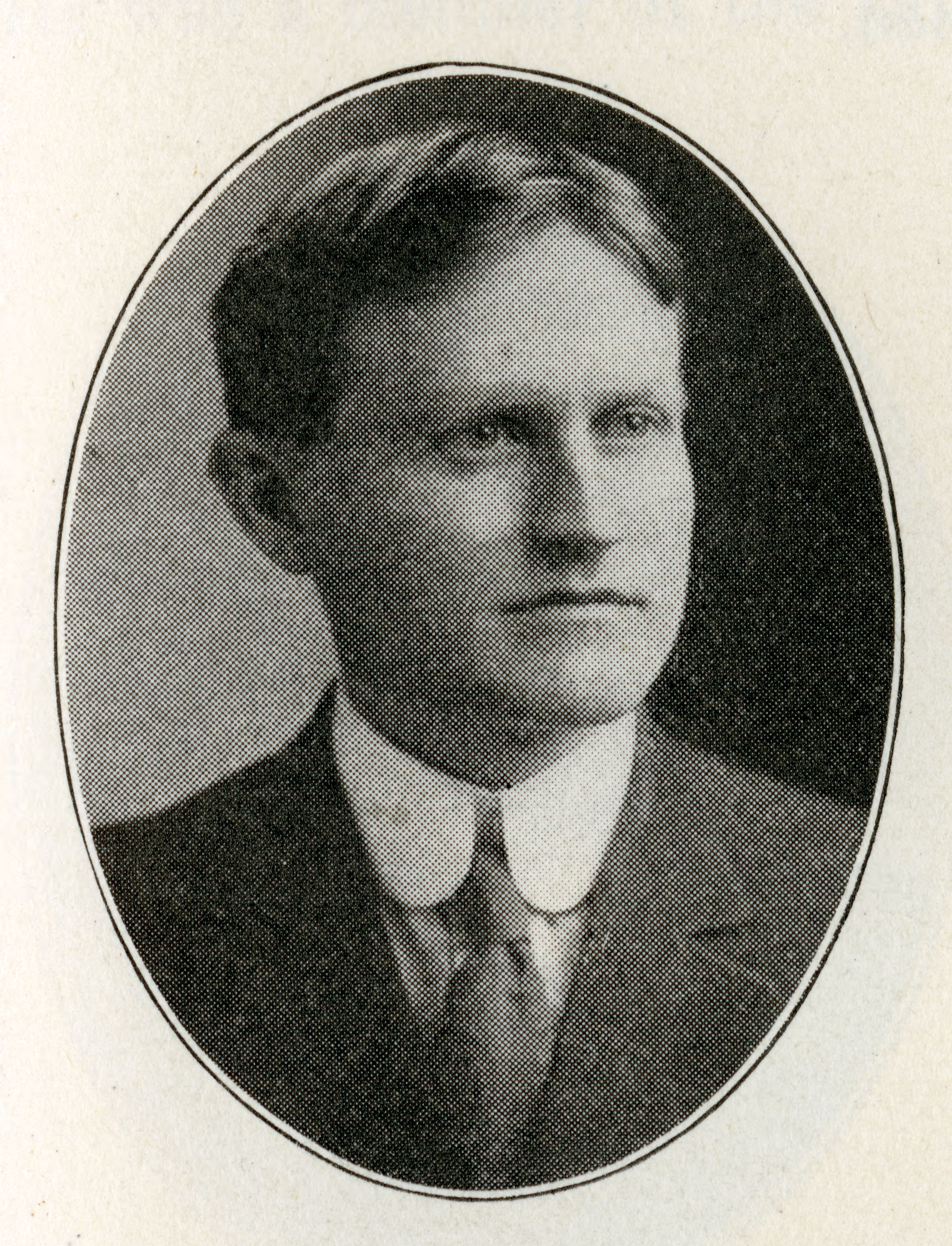
- Pfeander in 1911

Member of the Minnesota House of Representatives from the 19th district
- In office January 4, 1909 – January 3, 1915

Member of the Minnesota House of Representatives from the 14th district
- In office January 2, 1933 – January 6, 1935

Personal details
- Born: September 9, 1873 New Ulm, Minnesota
- Died: February 14, 1946 (aged 72)
- Party: Democratic

Maj. Albert Pfaender (September 9, 1873 – February 14, 1946) was a U.S. politician from the state of Minnesota. He was the son of Minnesota State Treasurer William Pfaender.

== Political career ==
Pfaender served in the Minnesota House of Representatives twice, first from 1909 – 1915, then again from 1933 – 1935. Following his first term in the legislature, Pfaender was elected City attorney of New Ulm, Minnesota, serving alongside mayor Louis A. Fritsche in 1914. Following the United States's entry into the First World War in 1917, Pfaender and Fritsche gave speeches in July of that year urging compliance with the draft, and Pfaender stated that he hoped no soldiers from New Ulm would be sent to fight in Europe. The Minnesota Commission of Public Safety, which together with Governor Joseph A. A. Burnquist, had recently been given near dictatorial powers, suspended Pfaender and Fritsche from their positions on August 21 for “promoting and participating in seditious public meetings.” On December 1, 1917, they were removed from office for their opposition to state and federal war policy. Pfaender was re-instated by 1920.

In 1934, Pfaender in the Democratic primary for Governor. He was defeated by John E. Regan and placed third, with only 14.97% of the vote.

In 1935, Pfaender was appointed as a member of the University of Minnesota board of regents, a position he would hold until his death in 1946.

== See also ==
- Anti-German sentiment
- Opposition to World War I
