= Earle Brown (Minnesota politician) =

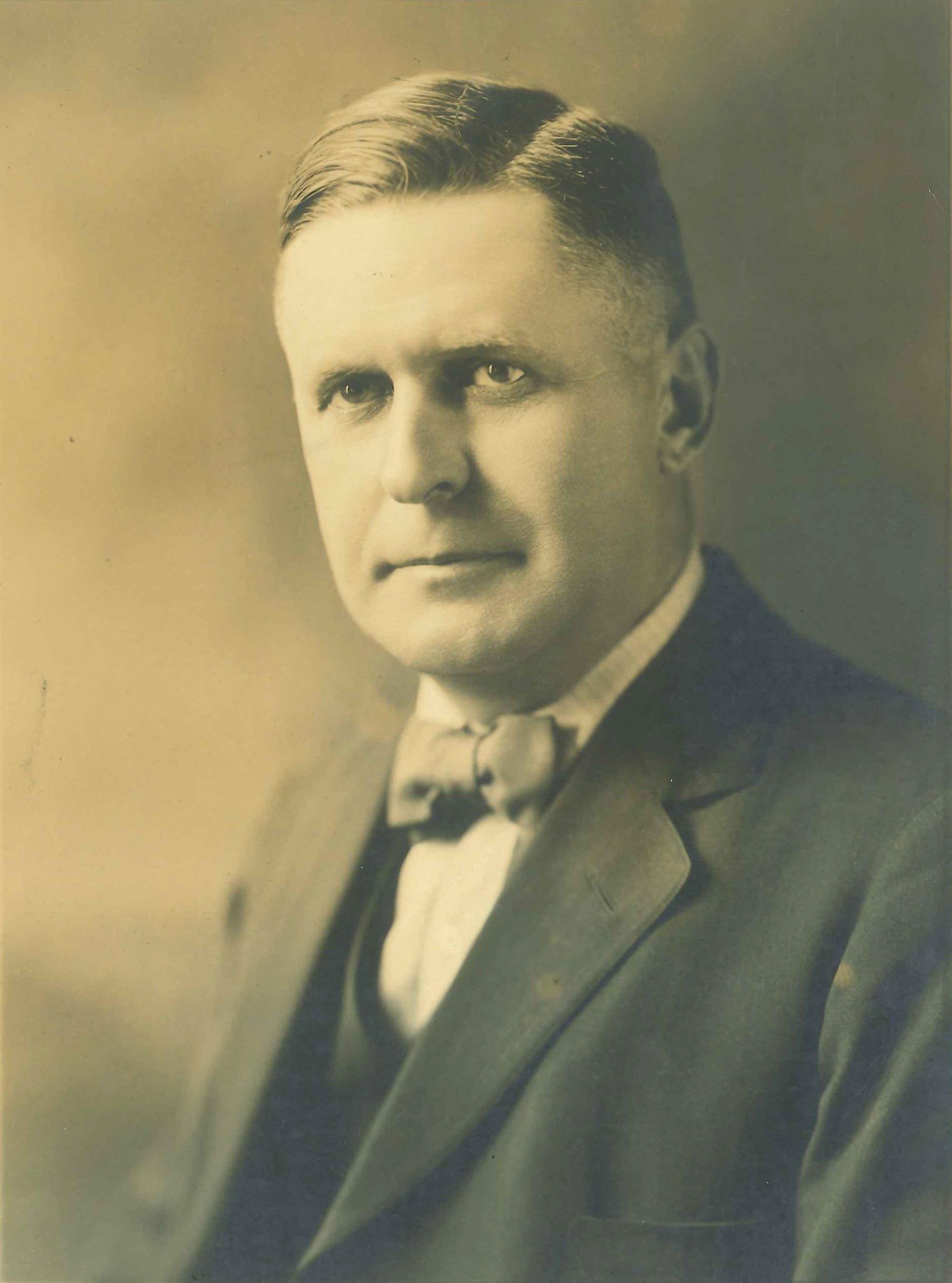
- Born: October 6, 1879; Minneapolis, Minnesota, US
- Died: March 12, 1963 (aged 83); Minneapolis, Minnesota, US
- Political party: Republican
- Spouse: Gwendoline Ida Foster Brown (m. 1921)

Earle Brown (October 6, 1879 – March 12, 1963) was a U.S. politician from the state of Minnesota.

In 1911, Brooklyn Center was incorporated at a meeting on his farm. Brown served two terms in the 1920s as Hennepin County Sheriff. In 1929, he was appointed first chief of the newly created Minnesota Highway Patrol by the Minnesota Legislature. He would serve in that position until 1932. He would again become Hennepin County Sheriff from 1943-1947.

Although not confirmed, it is suspected that Brown had ties with the Ku Klux Klan. In 2013, the book "The Ku Klux Klan in Minnesota" by Elizabeth Dorsey Hatle was published. The book claimed that Brown joined the KKK in 1923 to spy on it. Brown did nothing to stop or discourage their public displays, such as cross burnings.

He ran for governor in 1932, losing to incumbent Floyd B. Olson. While running his campaign, his campaign manager claimed that all allegations he was a member of, or affiliated with, the Klan were politically motivated. However, the allegations of Klan affiliation or membership were never denied by Brown or his campaign. Brown campaigned alongside fellow Republicans Raymond P. Chase and Oscar A. Swenson, who decried Olson as committed to State Socialism. Brown would lose the election, with only 32.34% of the vote.

He died on March 12, 1963 at Abbott Hospital. He was buried at Lakewood Cemetery.

Due to his potential connections with the KKK, many locations named after Brown and many memorials dedicated to him have been either re-named or removed. In 2024, a portrait of him in the Brooklyn Center city hall was stolen, but quickly returned by law enforcement.

== Electoral History ==
1932 Minnesota gubernatorial election
Party	Candidate	Votes	%	±%
Farmer–Labor	Floyd B. Olson (incumbent)	522,438	50.57%	−8.76%
Republican	Earle Brown	334,081	32.34%	−3.97%
Democratic	John E. Regan	169,859	16.44%	+12.79%
Communist	William Schneiderman	4,807	0.47%	−0.24%
Industrial	John P. Johnson	1,824	0.18%	n/a
Majority		188,357	18.23%	
Turnout		1,033,009		
Farmer–Labor hold		Swing		

== Legacy ==
- Brooklyn Center Elementary in Brooklyn Center was previously named 'Earle Brown Elementary'.
- Earle Brown Drive, in Brooklyn Center
- Earle Brown Tower, in Brooklyn Center

Party political offices
Preceded by Ray P. Chase	Republican nominee for Governor of Minnesota; 1932	Succeeded by Martin A. Nelson
