= William Nash (Minnesota politician) =

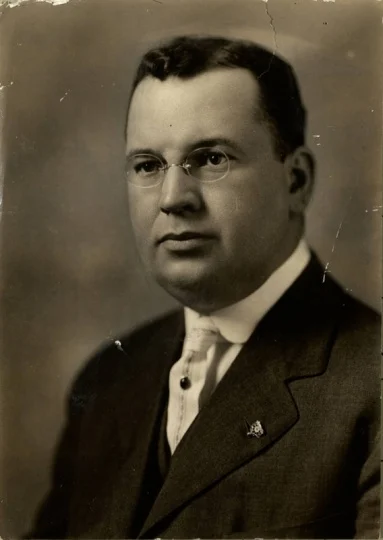
- Nash in 1918

County Attorney of Hennepin County
- In office January 1919 – September 5, 1920
- Preceded by: John M. Rees
- Succeeded by: Floyd B. Olson

Personal details
- Died: 1935 Brainerd, Minnesota

William M. Nash was a U.S. attorney and politician from the state of Minnesota.

In November 1918, after a career as a lawyer, Nash was elected County Attorney of Hennepin County. In February of 1919, he was in charge of handling the case of the St. Louis Park State Bank, which was undergoing financial issues. The bank mostly served soldiers who had served in World War I, and their wives and widows. Fearing the bank to be closed and money lost, Nash's office was stormed by those fearing destitution.

In January 1920, the Volstead Act came into effect, beginning prohibition. Nash collaborated with Hennepin County Sherriff Oscar Martinson to allow for the illegal import alcohol from Winnipeg to continue with minimal legal issue. On May 13, 1920, Nash was arrested. He was charged with taking bribes, and four prostitution charges unrelated to his other criminal activities. He pleaded not guilty. The case was widely publicized, and the trial lasted longer than a week. Nash was acquitted, and broke into tears following the not guilty verdict. he was removed from office by governor Joseph Burnquist. A personal ousting hearing was held before Burnquist.

Nash returned to his career as an attorney, where he did well. He died on a fishing trip in near Brainerd in 1935.
