= 1932 Minnesota gubernatorial election =

- November 8, 1932
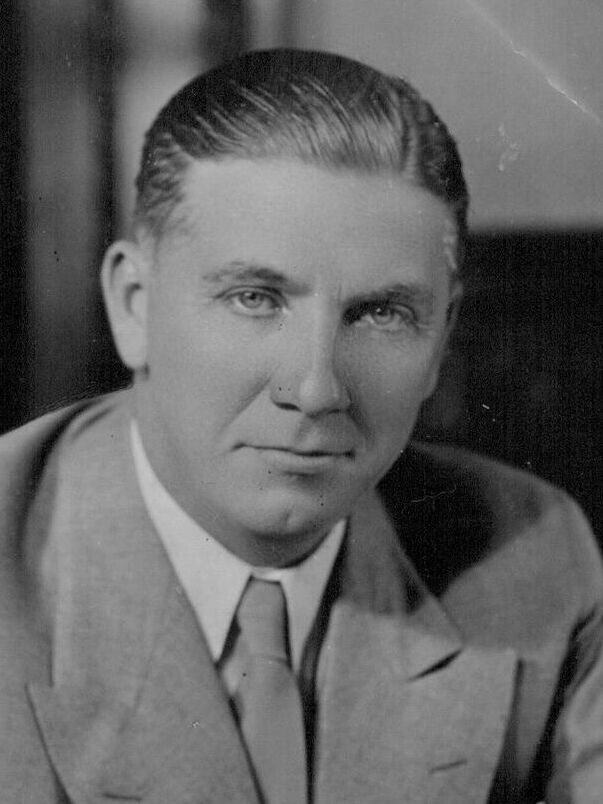

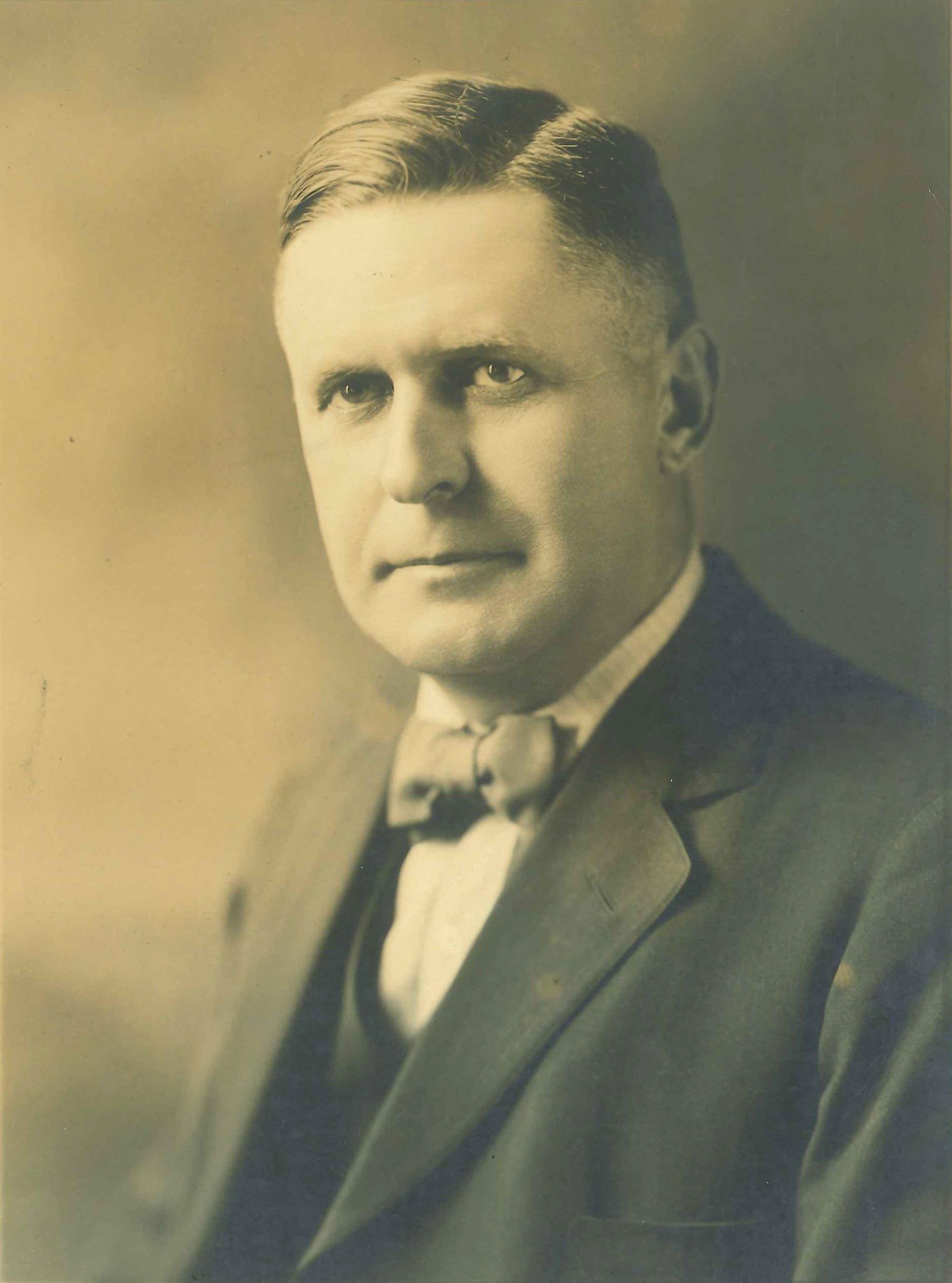

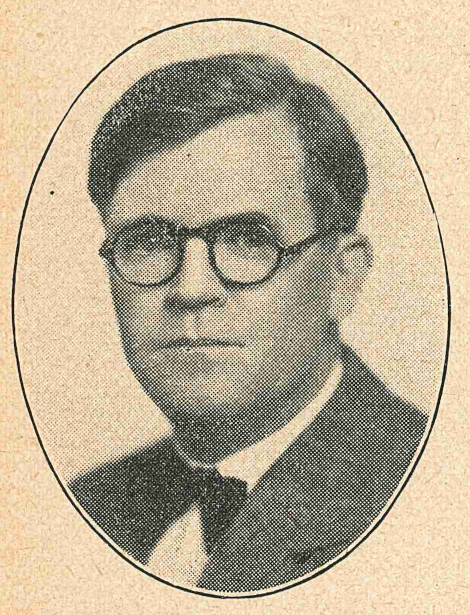
Nominee	Floyd B. Olson	Earle Brown	John E. Regan
Party	Farmer–Labor	Republican	Democratic
Popular vote	522,438	334,081	169,859
Percentage	50.57%	32.34%	16.44%
- County results Olson: 30–40% 40–50% 50–60% 60–70% 70–80% Brown: 30–40% 40–50% Regan: 30–40% 40–50% 50–60%
Governor before election
Floyd B. Olson
Farmer–Labor
Elected Governor
Floyd B. Olson
Farmer–Labor

The 1932 Minnesota gubernatorial election took place on November 8, 1932. Farmer-Labor candidate Floyd B. Olson defeated Republican challenger Earle Brown and Democratic challenger John E. Regan.

Olson was running for his second term, having been elected in 1930. This was the second gubernatorial election in Minnesota to take place during the Great Depression.

Incumbent Olson faced no primary election, being renominated by his party without opposition on March 30, 1932.

== Republican primary ==
The Republican primary election was held on June 20, 1932. Earle Brown was nominated following his victory in the primary election.

=== Candidates ===
==== Nominated ====
- Earle Brown, former Hennepin County sheriff

=== Eliminated in primary ===
- Franklin F. Ellsworth, former member of the House of Representatives

=== Results ===
Republican Party of Minnesota primary results
Party	Candidate	Votes	%
Republican	Earle Brown	187,215	73.77%
Republican	Franklin F. Ellsworth	66,559	26.23%
Total votes		253,774	100%

== Democratic primary ==
The Democratic primary election was held on June 20, 1932.

=== Candidates ===
==== Nominated ====
- John E. Regan, member of the Minnesota House of Representatives

=== Eliminated in primary ===
- James Hegland, harness maker
- Arthur Alexander Van Dyke, postmaster of St. Paul

=== Results ===
Democratic Party of Minnesota primary results
Party	Candidate	Votes	%
Democratic	John E. Regan	50,105	50.95%
Democratic	Arthur Alexander Van Dyke	30,133	30.64%
Democratic	James Hegland	18,094	18.40%
Total votes		98,332	100%

== Candidates ==
- Earle Brown, former Hennepin County sheriff (Republican)
- John P. Johnson, chiropractor (Industrial)
- Floyd B. Olson, incumbent (Farmer-Labor)
- John E. Regan, member of the Minnesota House of Representatives (Democratic)
- William Schneiderman, Minnesota district organizer of the Communist Party (Communist)

== Campaigns ==
One of Olson's goals was to ensure he was able to appeal to Democrats. Olson initially suggested a fusion ticket, as had previously been successful with John Lind in 1898, who ran as a fusion candidate between the Democratic party and the Populist Party. However, this idea died following Regan's victory in the Democratic primary, as Regan was opposed to a fusion ticket. Amid calls for him to drop out, Regan focused his campaign in defending his legitimacy as a serious candidate. He attacked Democrats who supported Olson, and referred specifically to the very pro-Olson Democrats of St. Paul as 'Soup Irish'. (Note: It is not clear what the phrase 'Soup Irish' means. It is possible it refers to Irish-Americans who do not work in industry, in contrast to Regan, who had experience working in industrial labor. This would be in reference to criticisms of Regan's labor policies.) Regan also berated Democratic politicians Edward Murphy and Tom E. Davis for a speech on the radio denouncing him as a serious candidate and endorsing Olson. Regan argued that if he truly was not a serious candidate, then the Olson campaign would not spend so much time and money trying to convince the public he wasn't.

Brown campaigned alongside fellow Republicans Raymond P. Chase and Oscar A. Swenson, who decried Olson as committed to State Socialism. Olson was also attacked by State Senator Milton Lightner for not vetoing a single appropriations bill in his first term. Olson was the first governor to achieve this feat, which Lightner considered irresponsible.

Brown battled accusations of affiliation or membership of the Ku Klux Klan during his campaign. Brown's campaign manager claimed that all allegations he was a member of, or affiliated with, the Klan were politically motivated. However, the allegations were never denied by Brown or his campaign.

While Brown continued to attack Olson for his financial and tax policies, Olson responded by stating that Brown's policies "Failed to consider human welfare," and such policies were responsible for the depression to begin with.

=== Straw vote ===
This was the first gubernatorial election in Minnesota in which a straw poll was conducted. Due to a small sample size, it proved to have little to no correlation with the actual election result.

Poll source	Date(s) administered	Sample size	Margin of error	Floyd Olson (FL)	Earle Brown (R)	John E. Regan (D)	Undecided
Business and Professional Men's Association	November 3, 1932	44	–	13%	61%	7%	19%

== Results ==
1932 gubernatorial election, Minnesota
Party	Candidate	Votes	%	±%
Farmer–Labor	Floyd B. Olson (incumbent)	522,438	50.57%	−8.76%
Republican	Earle Brown	334,081	32.34%	−3.97%
Democratic	John E. Regan	169,859	16.44%	+12.79%
Communist	William Schneiderman	4,807	0.47%	−0.24%
Industrial	John P. Johnson	1,824	0.18%	n/a
Majority		188,357	18.23%	
Turnout		1,033,009		
Farmer–Labor hold		Swing		

== See also ==
- List of Minnesota gubernatorial elections
