= Floyd B. Olson =

22nd governor of Minnesota (1891-1936)

Floyd Olson
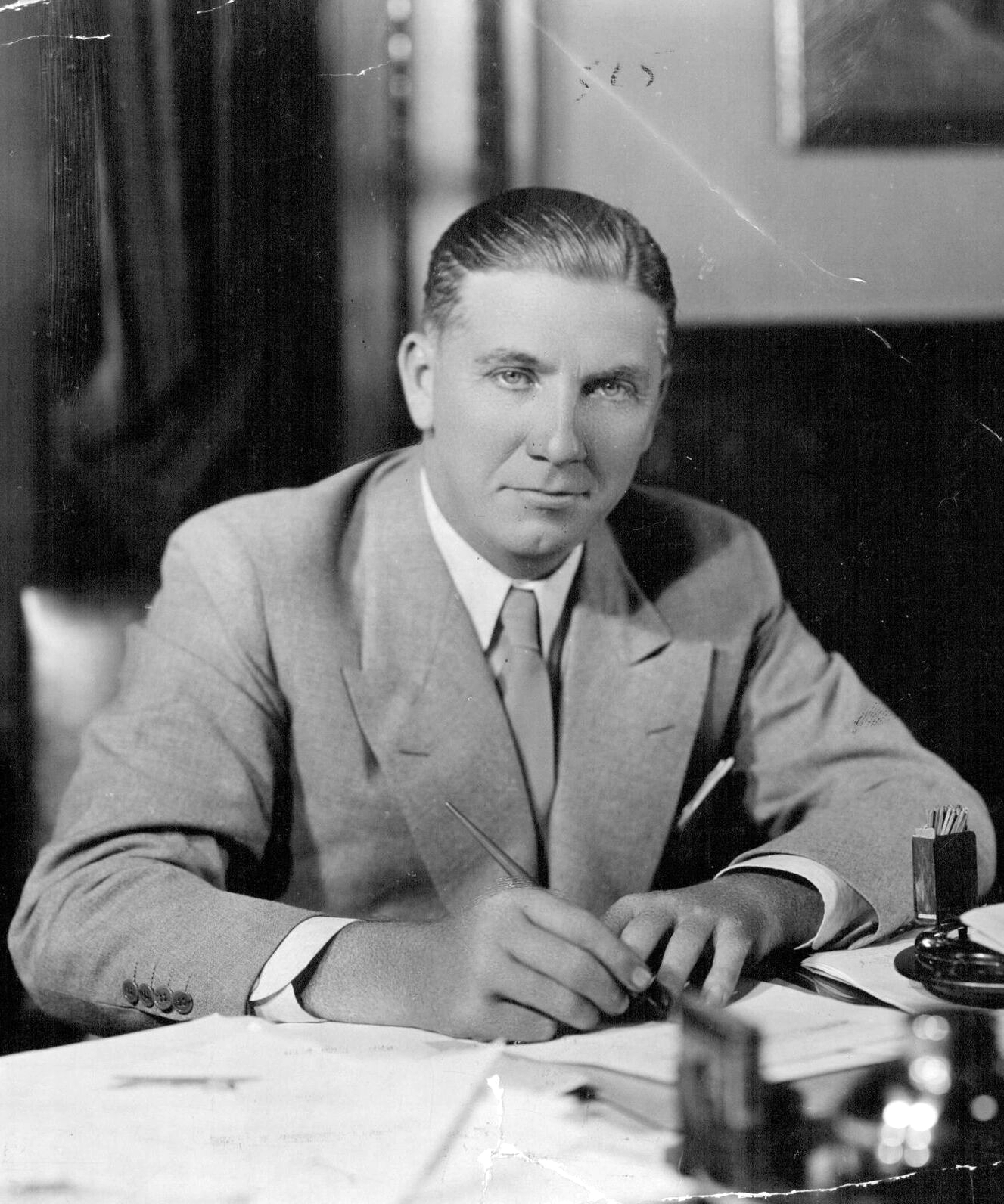
- Olson c. 1931

22nd Governor of Minnesota
- In office January 6, 1931 – August 22, 1936
- Lieutenant: Henry M. Arens; Konrad K. Solberg; Hjalmar Petersen
- Preceded by: Theodore Christianson
- Succeeded by: Hjalmar Petersen

County Attorney of Hennepin County
- In office September 13, 1920 – January 6, 1931
- Preceded by: William Nash
- Succeeded by: Edward J. Goff

Personal details
- Born: Floyd Bjørnstjerne Olson; November 13, 1891 Minneapolis, Minnesota, U.S.
- Died: August 22, 1936 (aged 44) Rochester, Minnesota, U.S.
- Resting place: Lakewood Cemetery
- Party: Farmer–Labor (after 1924)
- Other political affiliations: Democratic (before 1924)
- Spouse: Ada Krejci
- Children: Patricia Olson
- Education: Northwestern College of Law

Floyd Bjørnstjerne "Skipper" Olson (November 13, 1891 – August 22, 1936) was an American politician and lawyer who served three-terms as the 22nd governor of Minnesota from January 6, 1931 until his death in office at the age of forty-four on August 22, 1936. A left-wing populist, Olson was a member of the Minnesota Farmer–Labor Party, and the first member of the party to win the office of governor. He was a prominent governor of Minnesota and an influential American politician.

== Early life ==
Floyd B. Olson was born on the north side of Minneapolis, Minnesota, the only child of a Norwegian father, Paul Olsen, and a Swedish mother, Ida Maria (Nilsdotter). The North Side neighborhood where Olson grew up was the home of a sizable Orthodox Jewish community, and Olson's friendships with some of the local Jewish families led him to serve as a shabbos goy, assisting Jews on the Sabbath by performing actions they were not permitted to do. Olson picked up Yiddish from his childhood associations with his Jewish neighbors and years later spoke the language fluently while campaigning in Jewish communities, in addition to having several Jews serve him in advisory roles while in elected office.

After graduating from North High School in Minneapolis in 1909, Olson went to work for the Northern Pacific Railway. The next year, he enrolled at the University of Minnesota, but he left after only a year, during which he was always in trouble for wearing a derby in violation of school rules and for refusing to participate in required ROTC drills.

Heading west, Olson worked a series of odd jobs in Canada and Alaska before settling briefly in Seattle, Washington, where he became a stevedore and joined the Industrial Workers of the World. During this time, Olson read widely and began to adopt a populist, semi-socialist philosophy he would retain for the rest of his life.

Returning to Minnesota in 1913, Olson enrolled at William Mitchell College of Law (then the Northwestern College of Law), earning his degree in 1915. That same year, he met and married Ada Krejci in New Prague, Minnesota, and became a practicing lawyer.

== Hennepin County Attorney ==
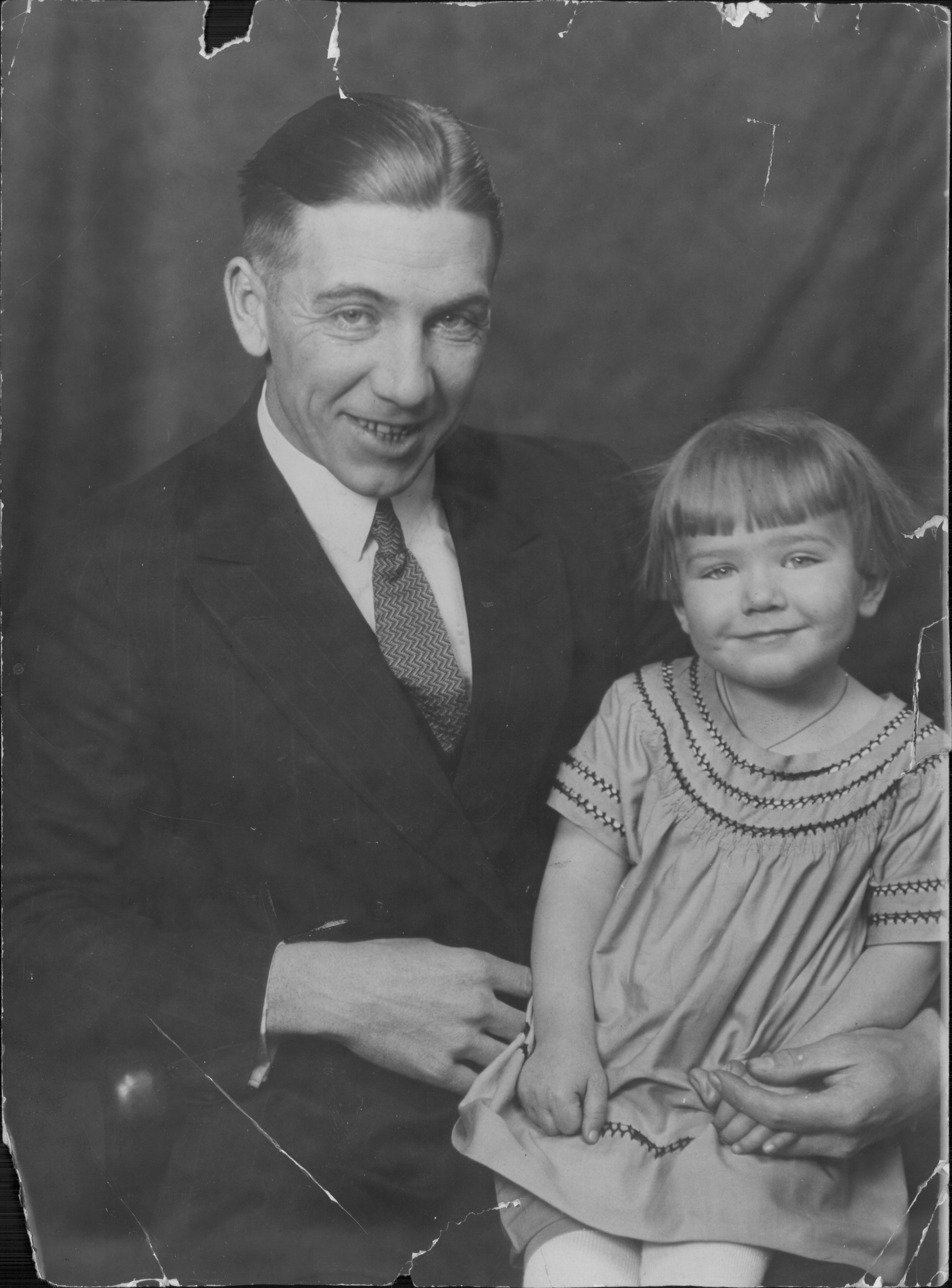
Olson as County Attorney with daughter Patricia, 1924

In 1919, Olson was hired as an Assistant Hennepin County Attorney and by the following year had himself become the Hennepin County Attorney after the previous attorney, William Nash, was fired for accepting bribes.

During that period, he made his first foray into politics when he helped form the Committee of 48, an organization that attempted to draft Senator Robert M. La Follette to run for president on a third-party ticket. The effort proved unsuccessful, but La Follette would later run on the Progressive Party ticket in 1924. That same year, Olson ran in the Democratic primary for the local seat in the House of Representatives but lost.

As Hennepin County Attorney, Olson quickly earned a name for himself as a stern prosecutor who relished going after crooked businessmen. He took on the Ku Klux Klan in a well-publicized case that brought both respect and death threats and was reelected to the position in 1922 and 1926.

== Candidate for governor ==
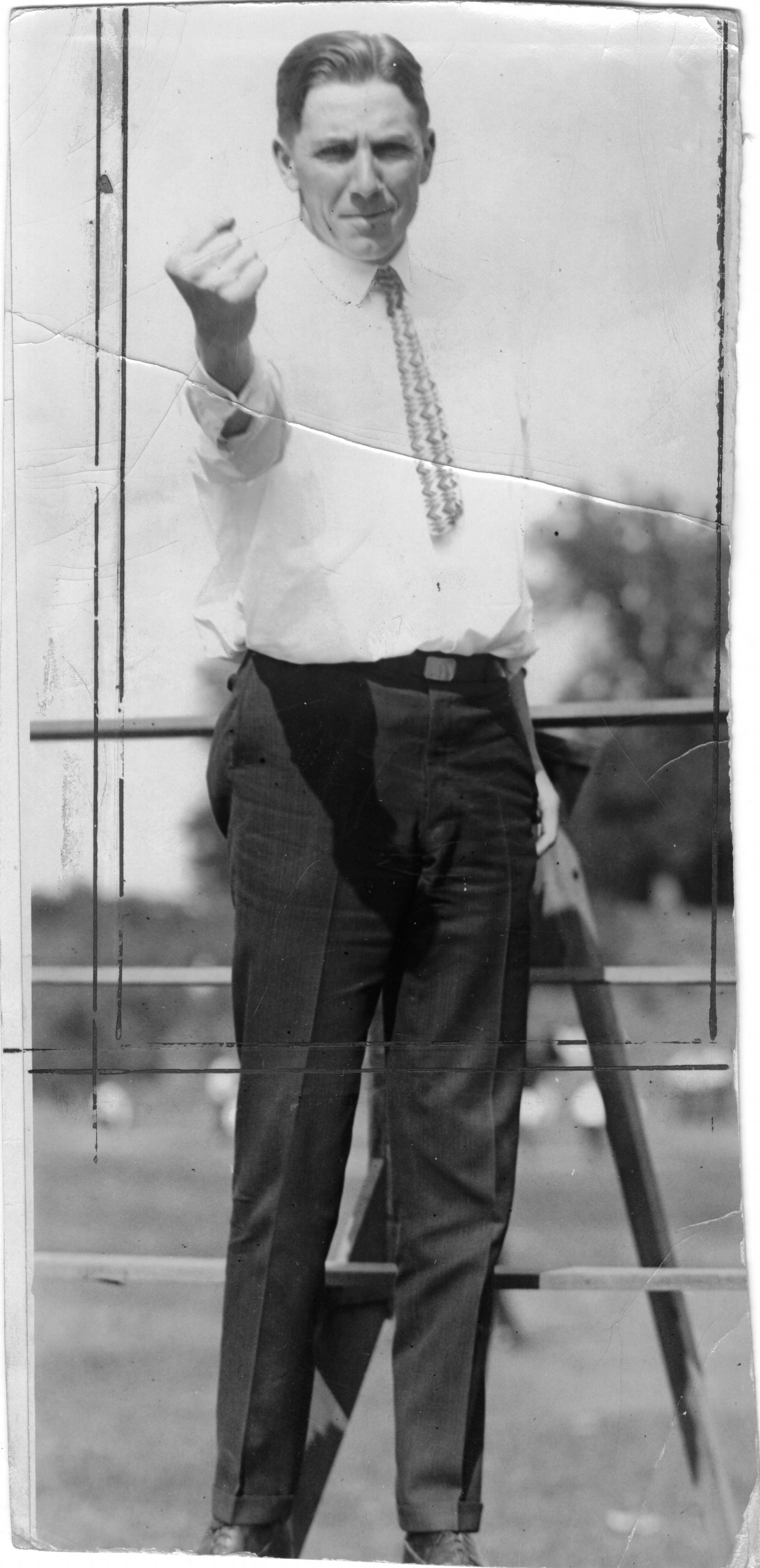
Olson strikes a pose, 1924

In 1923, Olson brought a case against the leaders of the Minnesota Citizens Alliance, a conservative business organization dedicated to preserving right-to-work laws, after they hired a hitman to dynamite the home of a union leader. Olson's vigorous pursuit of the Citizens Alliance made him a hero to the local labor movement, which encouraged him to run for the Minnesota Farmer-Labor Party's gubernatorial nomination in 1924.

Having secured the endorsement of the Hennepin County Farmer-Labor Central Committee, Olson narrowly won the nomination in a bitterly fought primary. Buoyed by La Follette's presidential campaign (La Follette endorsed Olson and vice versa), he received 43% of the vote to Republican candidate Theodore Christianson's 48%. Democratic candidate Carlos Avery came in a distant third with 6%.

Four years later, in 1928, the new "Farmer-Labor Association" (which had changed its name to avoid being linked with local communists) attempted to draft Olson to run for governor again. Although the party committee once again endorsed him and this time guaranteed that he would not face a primary battle, Olson declined to run. In the U.S. presidential election, 1928, the Farmer-Labor candidate lost in the Republican landslide that accompanied Herbert Hoover's election.

By 1930, however, the stock market had crashed, and the Great Depression had begun. After the party's newspaper urged that Olson be drafted, he easily won the nomination. Forming a coalition of farmers, organized labor, and small businessmen, Olson swept to a landslide victory in the election, receiving 59% of the vote in a four-way race and winning 82 of the state's 87 counties.

== Olson as governor ==
At the time Olson assumed his office, Minnesota's legislature was officially non-partisan but was in reality dominated by conservative Republicans who opposed most of what Olson stood for.

Nevertheless, Olson soon proved himself skilled at the art of politics and managed to fulfill the vast majority of his campaign promises. During his three terms as governor, Olson proposed, and the legislature passed, bills that instituted a progressive income tax, created a social security program for the elderly, expanded the state's environmental conservation programs, guaranteed equal pay for women and the right to collective bargaining, and instituted a minimum wage and a system of unemployment insurance. Olson received criticism from State Senator Milton Lightner for not vetoing a single appropriations bill in his first term. Olson was the first governor to achieve this feat, which Lightner considered irresponsible.

Despite these changes, the thing Olson wanted the most, a bill that would have put Minnesota's electric utilities, iron mines, oil fields, grain elevators, and meatpacking plants under state ownership, never saw the light of day, as the legislature balked at what they saw as socialism and Olson insisted was "cooperativism".

As the platform of his party grew successively more radical, Olson's support amongst the middle class gradually began to erode. His vigorous support from labor and agriculture, however, remained undiminished and he was easily reelected in 1932 and 1934.

In 1933, Time magazine quoted Olson speaking from the steps of the state capitol:

I am making a last appeal to the Legislature. If the Senate does not make provision for the sufferers in the State and the Federal Government refuses to aid, I shall invoke the powers I hold and shall declare martial law. ... A lot of people who are now fighting [relief] measures because they happen to possess considerable wealth will be brought in by provost guard and be obliged to give up more than they would now. There is not going to be misery in this State if I can humanly prevent it. ... Unless the Federal and State governments act to insure against recurrence of the present situation, I hope the present system of government goes right down to hell.

On May 16, 1934, the trucker's union in Minneapolis started a strike that quickly resulted in open violence. The violence ebbed and flowed for the next two months until Governor Olson declared martial law on July 26, and mobilized 4,000 National Guardsmen under the command of Adjutant General Ellard A. Walsh. Walsh used a combination of checkpoints, security patrols, and curfews to restore order. As the violence subsided, negotiations resumed, and an agreement was reached to end the labor dispute.

Despite considerable achievements and widespread support, Olson's administration was marred by allegations made by crusading newspaper editor Walter Liggett that there were links between some members of his administration and organized crime. No evidence ever implicated Olson personally, however. Liggett was gunned down in front of his family in 1935. Kid Cann, a Minnesota gangster, was charged with but not convicted of the killing.

Olson vocally criticized those who opposed his policies, notably calling out State Senators Anton J. Rockne, J. V. Weber and Claude MacKenzie for opposing a $5,000,000 relief bill, stating "These men were willing to play politics with human misery." In order to pass a mortgage moratorium despite opposition within the legislature, Olson arranged for one of his speechwriters, Sylvester McGovern, to host a radio show in which McGovern (under the pseudonym 'Rome Roberts') would criticize and build up public opinion against Olson's opponents, starting in January 1935. The radio show would be successful in building public resentment for conservatives in the legislature, to Olson's benefit.

Olson and his Farmer-Labor Party made an informal alliance with President Franklin D. Roosevelt and supported him in 1936. Roosevelt was building the New Deal coalition and wanted the solid base Olson could promise in Minnesota, where the Democrats were a weak third party. Roosevelt had a deal with Olson whereby the FLP would get federal patronage, and in turn the FLP would work to block a third-party ticket against Roosevelt in 1936.

== Final days ==
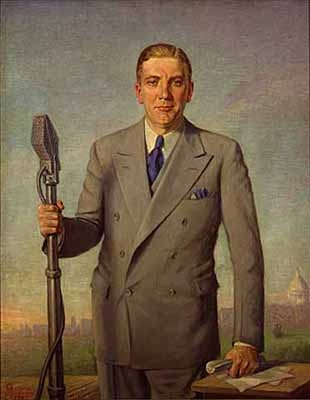
Portrait of Olson as Governor by Carl Bohnen

In 1935, Olson ruled out the possibility of running for president in the 1936 election, as a third-party candidate. Instead, on November 18, 1935, he announced his intention to run against longtime incumbent Thomas Schall for one of Minnesota's U.S. Senate seats. His chances improved the next month when Senator Schall died in office following a road accident, and Elmer Benson, the interim successor to Schall chosen by Olson, promised not to run for the seat in the 1936 election.

However, Olson's own health was beginning to fail. Having suffered from severe ulcers ever since his election, Olson went to the Mayo Clinic in December 1935 and was diagnosed with stomach cancer (although sources differ on what type of cancer it was, stomach cancer is the most likely candidate). The cancer would eventually prove fatal, though Olson was not told of the seriousness of his condition until near the end of his life.

Thus reassured of his "good health", Olson proceeded to further weaken himself by not only resuming his duties as governor but also beginning to organize his party's state convention and returning to his senatorial campaign. As he stumped across the state, promising to support federal ownership of monopolies, his cancer metastasized.

Olson last made a public appearance on June 29, 1936, giving a stump speech in Minnehaha Park in Minneapolis. The next day, he returned to the Mayo Clinic for treatment, but it was too late. He died there on August 22 at the age of 44. He was buried in Lakewood Cemetery.

Prior to his health's failure, he was considered as a serious future contender for President of the United States.

== Monuments ==
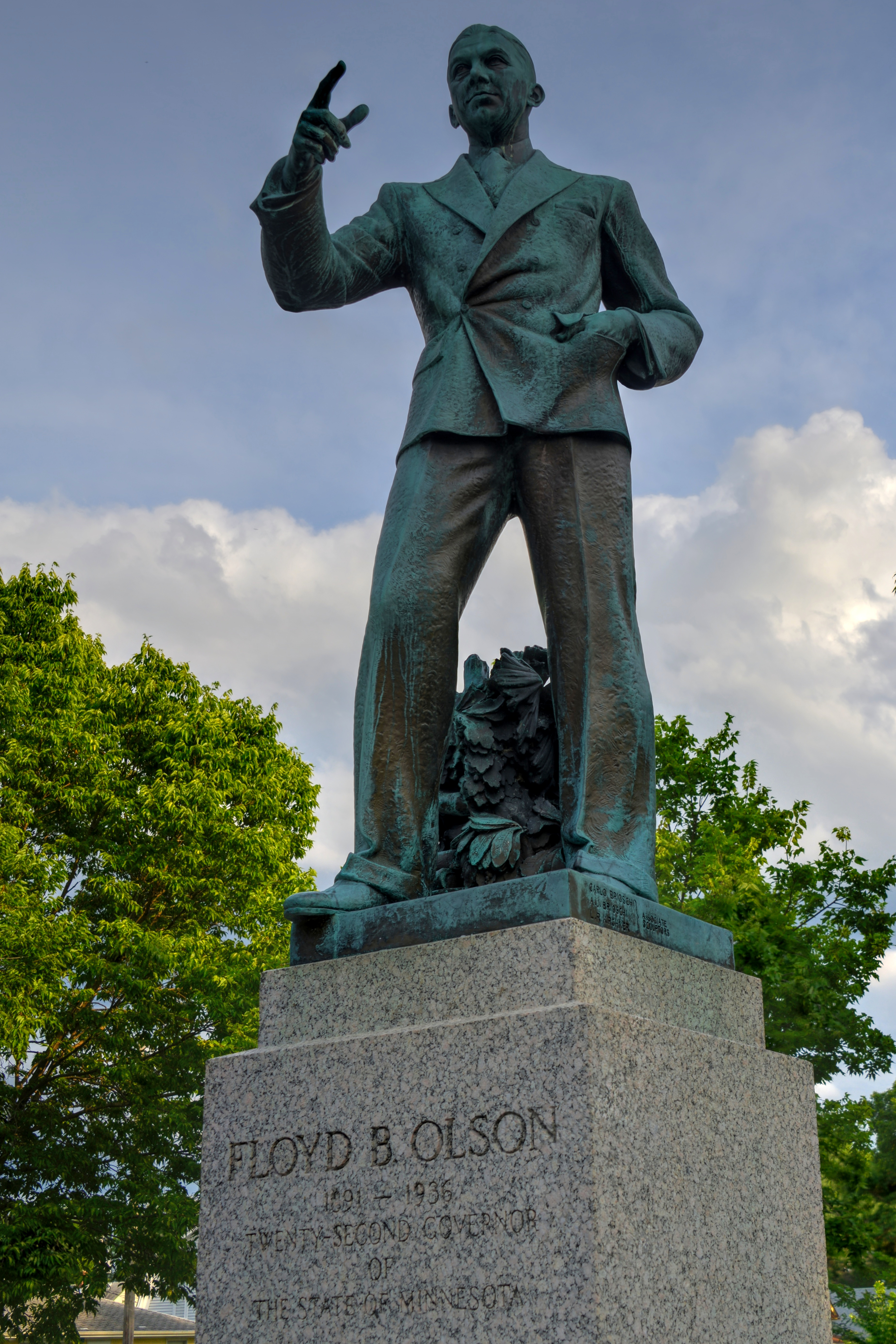
Olson Memorial Highway statue

Since his death, dozens of statues of Olson have been constructed throughout the state, many of which declare him to be the state's "greatest governor".

Shortly after Olson died, Minnesota State Highway 55 (a highway that was then being constructed) was renamed the "Floyd B. Olson Memorial Highway" in his honor. A proposal by the Taxpayers League in late 2004 to rename the highway after the recently deceased President Ronald Reagan met with widespread public condemnation and was soon abandoned.

In 1974, Olson's home at 1914 West 49th Street in Minneapolis was listed on the National Register of Historic Places.

== Electoral history ==
=== U.S. Representative (1920) ===
1920 Minnesota 5th District U.S. Representative election (Democratic primary)
Party	Candidate	Votes	%
Democratic	T. O. Dahl	1,263	55.13%
Democratic	Floyd B. Olson	1,028	44.87%
Total votes		2,291	100.00%

=== Governor of Minnesota (1924) ===
Minnesota gubernatorial election, 1924 (Farmer–Labor primary)
Party	Candidate	Votes	%
Farmer–Labor	Floyd B. Olson	55,825	28.13%
Farmer–Labor	Tom Davis	55,532	27.99%
Farmer–Labor	I. A. Fritsche	41,831	21.08%
Farmer–Labor	Victor E. Lawson	20,784	10.47%
Farmer–Labor	W. W. Royster	9,083	4.58%
Farmer–Labor	William A. Schaper	8,134	4.10%
Farmer–Labor	Thomas Vollom	7,245	3.65%
Total votes		198,434	100.00%

Minnesota gubernatorial election, 1924 (General election)
Party	Candidate	Votes	%
Republican	Theodore Christianson	406,692	48.71%
Farmer–Labor	Floyd B. Olson	366,029	43.84%
Democratic	Carlos Avery	49,353	5.91%
Prohibition	Michael Ferch	9,052	1.08%
Industrial	Oscar Anderson	3,876	0.46%
Total votes		835,002	100.00%

=== Governor of Minnesota (1930–1934) ===
Minnesota gubernatorial election, 1930 (Farmer–Labor primary)
Party	Candidate	Votes	%
Farmer–Labor	Floyd B. Olson	60,455	83.68%
Farmer–Labor	Carl E. Taylor	11,791	16.32%
Total votes		72,246	100.00%

Minnesota gubernatorial election, 1930 (General election)
Party	Candidate	Votes	%
Farmer–Labor	Floyd B. Olson	473,154	59.34%
Republican	Ray P. Chase	289,528	36.31%
Democratic	Edward Indrehus	29,109	3.65%
Communist	Karl Reeve	5,594	0.70%
Total votes		797,385	100.00%

Minnesota gubernatorial election, 1932 (General election)
Party	Candidate	Votes	%
Farmer–Labor	Floyd B. Olson	522,438	50.57%
Republican	Earle Brown	334,081	32.34%
Democratic	John E. Regan	169,859	16.44%
Communist	William Schneiderman	4,807	0.47%
Industrial	John P. Johnson	1,824	0.18%
Total votes		1,033,009	100.00%

Minnesota gubernatorial election, 1934 (Farmer–Labor primary)
Party	Candidate	Votes	%
Farmer–Labor	Floyd B. Olson	238,821	87.77%
Farmer–Labor	John Lind III	33,268	12.23%
Total votes		272,089	100.00%

Minnesota gubernatorial election, 1934 (General election)
Party	Candidate	Votes	%
Farmer–Labor	Floyd B. Olson	468,812	44.61%
Republican	Martin A. Nelson	396,359	37.72%
Democratic	John E. Regan	176,928	16.84%
Independent	Arthur C. Townley	4,454	0.42%
Communist	Samuel K. Davis	4,334	0.41%
Total votes		1,050,887	100.00%

=== U.S. Senator (1936) ===
1936 Minnesota U.S. Senate election (Farmer–Labor primary)
Party	Candidate	Votes	%
Farmer–Labor	Floyd B. Olson	175,652	92.64%
Farmer–Labor	Carl E. Taylor	13,952	7.36%
Total votes		189,604	100.00%

== See also ==
- Floyd of Rosedale, a sculpture of a pig that Governor Olson won in a football bet.

Party political offices
Preceded by Magnus Johnson	Farmer–Labor nominee for Governor of Minnesota; 1924	Succeeded by Magnus Johnson
Preceded by Ernest Lundeen	Farmer–Labor nominee for Governor of Minnesota; 1930, 1932, 1934	Succeeded by Elmer Austin Benson
Preceded by Ernest Lundeen	Farmer–Labor nominee for U.S. Senator from Minnesota (Class 2); 1936	Succeeded by Ernest Lundeen
Political offices
Preceded by Theodore Christianson	Governor of Minnesota; 1931–1936	Succeeded by Hjalmar Petersen
Preceded by William Nash	County Attorney of Hennepin County; 1920–1930	Succeeded by Edward J. Goff
