= Milton Lightner =

American politician

Milton Charles Lightner
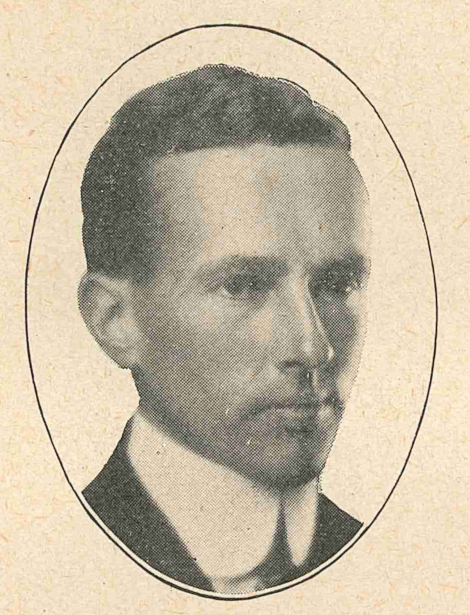
- Lightner in 1921

Member of the Minnesota Senate from the 40th district
- In office 1931–1954

Member of the Minnesota House of Representatives from the 40th district
- In office 1921–1930

Personal details
- Born: December 13, 1886 Saint Paul, Minnesota, U.S.
- Died: March 11, 1967 (aged 80)
- Party: Republican
- Education: Yale University; Harvard Law School
- Occupation: Attorney

Milton Lightner (1887–1967) was an American politician and lawyer in the state of Minnesota. He served in the Minnesota House of Representatives from 1921 to 1930 and the Minnesota Senate from 1931 to 1954. He was a member of the Republican Party.

Lightner was a major opponent of governor Floyd B. Olson, who Lightner attacked for not vetoing a single appropriations bill in his first term. Olson was the first governor to achieve this feat, which Lightner considered irresponsible.

In 1969, he was honored by the State Senate.
