= Joseph J. Moriarty =

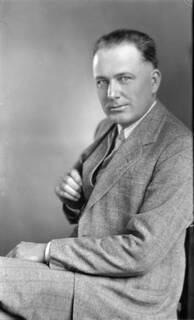
Joseph J. Moriarty, 1925

Judge Joseph James Moriarty (Note: Sometimes spelled 'Moriarity') (March 23, 1884 – February 2, 1963) was a U.S. politician and judge from the state of Minnesota.

Moriarty grew up in Belle Plaine, Minnesota. He became a lawyer in 1910, and moved to Shakopee. Moriarty served one term in the Minnesota House of Representatives, from 1911 – 1913 as a Democrat. He did not seek a second term to run for mayor of Shakopee, an office he would win, and serve out one term as. In 1930, unsuccessfully ran to retake his house seat. In 1934, he ran for Governor of Minnesota in the Democratic Primary. He placed sixth, with only 3.51%.

Moriarty became 8th Judicial District Court Judge in 1937. In 1948, he was invited by Lucius D. Clay to give a speech in Kassel. Moriarty spoke on democracy and the reconstruction of Germany following World War II. His speech was positively received by both the German and American press. He lost re-election in 1950 to his political rival, County Attorney Harold E. Flynn. In retirement, he was a supporter of a failed bill that would have allowed the state to appeal criminal cases.
