= Elmer A. Benson =

American politician (1895–1985)

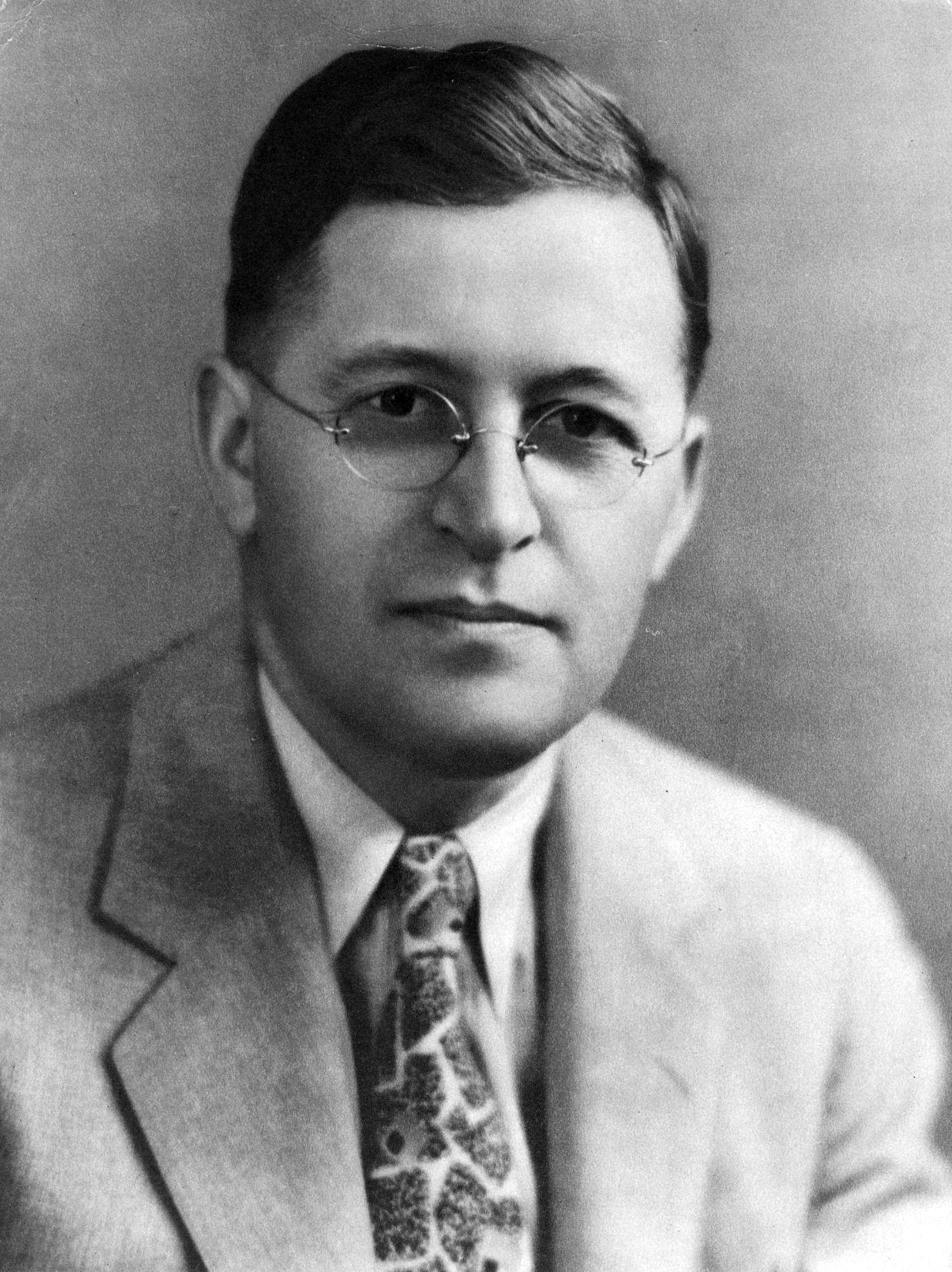

24th Governor of Minnesota
- In office January 4, 1937 – January 2, 1939
- Lieutenant: Gottfrid Lindsten
- Preceded by: Hjalmar Petersen
- Succeeded by: Harold Stassen

United States Senator from Minnesota
- In office December 27, 1935 – November 3, 1936
- Appointed by: Floyd B. Olson
- Preceded by: Thomas D. Schall
- Succeeded by: Guy V. Howard

Personal details
- Born: September 22, 1895 Appleton, Minnesota, U.S.
- Died: March 13, 1985 (aged 89) Minneapolis, Minnesota, U.S.
- Party: Democratic-Farmer-Labor (1944-1948)
- Other political affiliations: Farmer-Labor (Before 1944); Progressive Party (After 1948)
- Spouse: Frances Lillian Miller (m. 1922)
- Education: William Mitchell College of Law

Military service
- Branch/service: United States Army
- Years of service: 1918–1919
- Rank: Private
- Battles/wars: World War I

Elmer Austin Benson (September 22, 1895 – March 13, 1985) was an American lawyer and politician from Minnesota. In 1935, Benson was appointed to the U.S. Senate following the death of Thomas Schall. He served as the 24th governor of Minnesota, defeating Republican Martin Nelson in a landslide in Minnesota's 1936 gubernatorial election. He lost the governorship two years later to Republican Harold Stassen in the 1938 gubernatorial election.

== Early life & education ==
Benson was born in 1895 in Appleton, Minnesota. His father, Tom Benson, was a member of the Non-Partisan League. His maternal grandfather was a signer of the Norwegian Declaration of Independence. He studied law at William Mitchell College of Law (then the St. Paul College of Law) and served for a year in the U.S. Army during World War I. He never practiced law after returning from active duty, choosing instead to pursue a banking and business career.

== Entry into politics ==
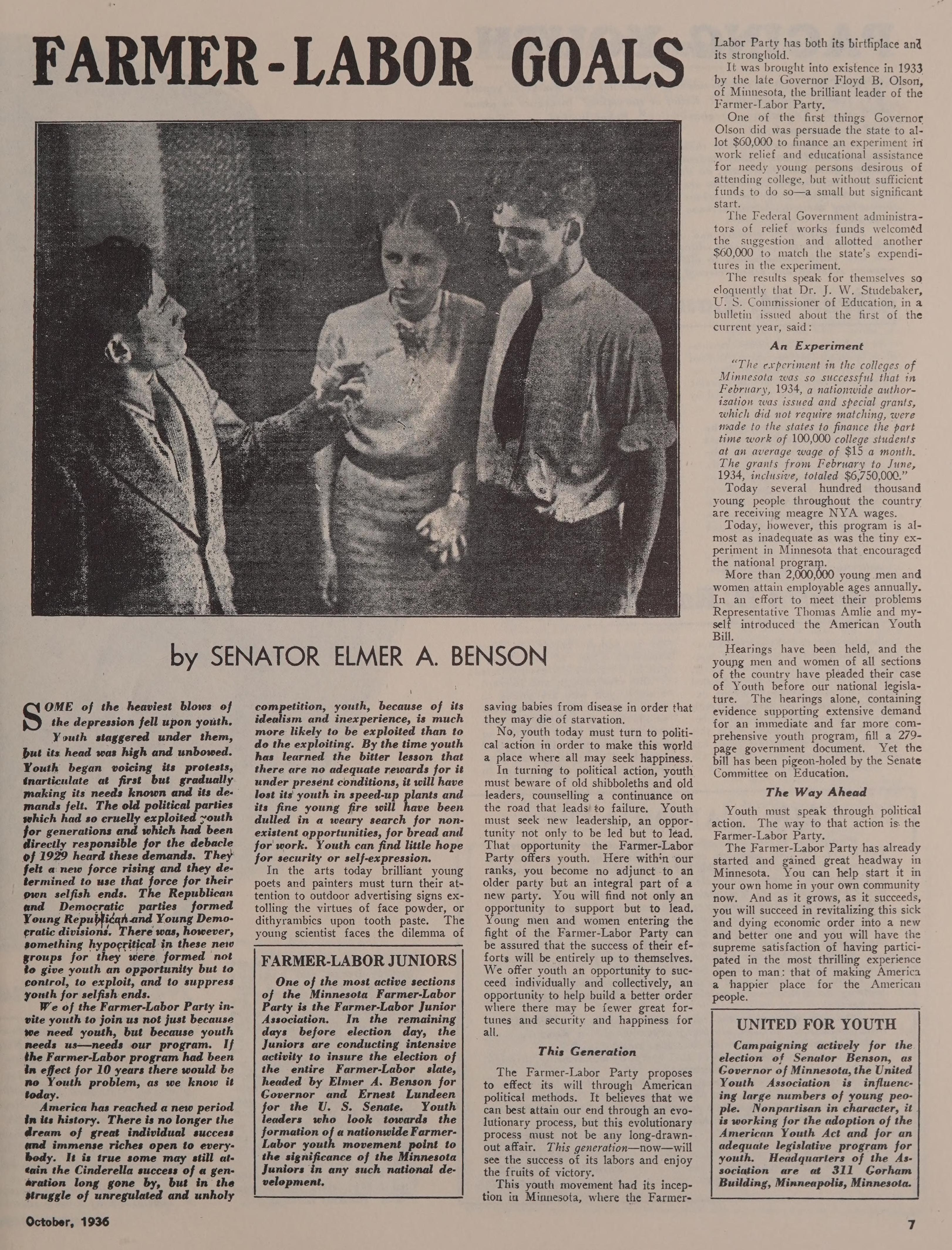
"Farmer-Labor Goals," an article by Benson for the Champion of Youth, published October 1936

While working as a banker, Benson also organized the Farmer-Labor Party in his native Swift County. He was a close ally of Governor Floyd B. Olson, another Farmer-Laborite, who helped orchestrate Benson's political rise. Olson appointed Benson state Commissioner of Securities in 1932. On April 30, 1933, Olson appointed Benson as Commissioner of Banking. Olson promoted Benson again, choosing him to replace Thomas D. Schall in the United States Senate after Schall's death in December 1935. Benson served in the 74th congress until November 3, 1936.

== Governor of Minnesota ==
After Olson's premature death from cancer in 1936 and the interregnum of Lieutenant Governor Hjalmar Petersen, Benson stepped into the breach and was elected the 24th governor of Minnesota by the largest margin in state history. He served as the 24th governor of Minnesota from January 4, 1937, to January 2, 1939. His defeat by a record margin in 1938 is seen as the beginning of the end of the Farmer-Labor Party as an independent political force and a setback for progressive politics in Minnesota.

Benson launched his campaign on September 21, 1936, at the county armory in Appleton, Minnesota. In his keynote address, he argued against the Republican plan to pass a constitutional amendment banning property tax and increasing sales tax. Benson argued that the state should instead deliver tax relief by raising the income tax on the rich, the inheritance tax, and various forms of higher corporate tax. All 2,000 seats at the armory were filled, as was all standing room, and 3,000 people gathered in a nearby park to listen to the broadcast. Benson found it difficult to deliver the speech due to the amount of applause received. On October 9, 1936, Franklin D. Roosevelt delivered an address at the Minnesota State Capitol in which he endorsed Benson for governor. Benson called Roosevelt a "man who has done more for industrial workers, small business men, and farmers than any other man in this generation". Like previous Farmer-Laborite candidates, Benson faced regular accusations of communism. Specifically, he was accused of being a supporter of Earl Browder. Benson said these accusations were created to distract from real issues. He did not treat them seriously, mostly ignoring them.

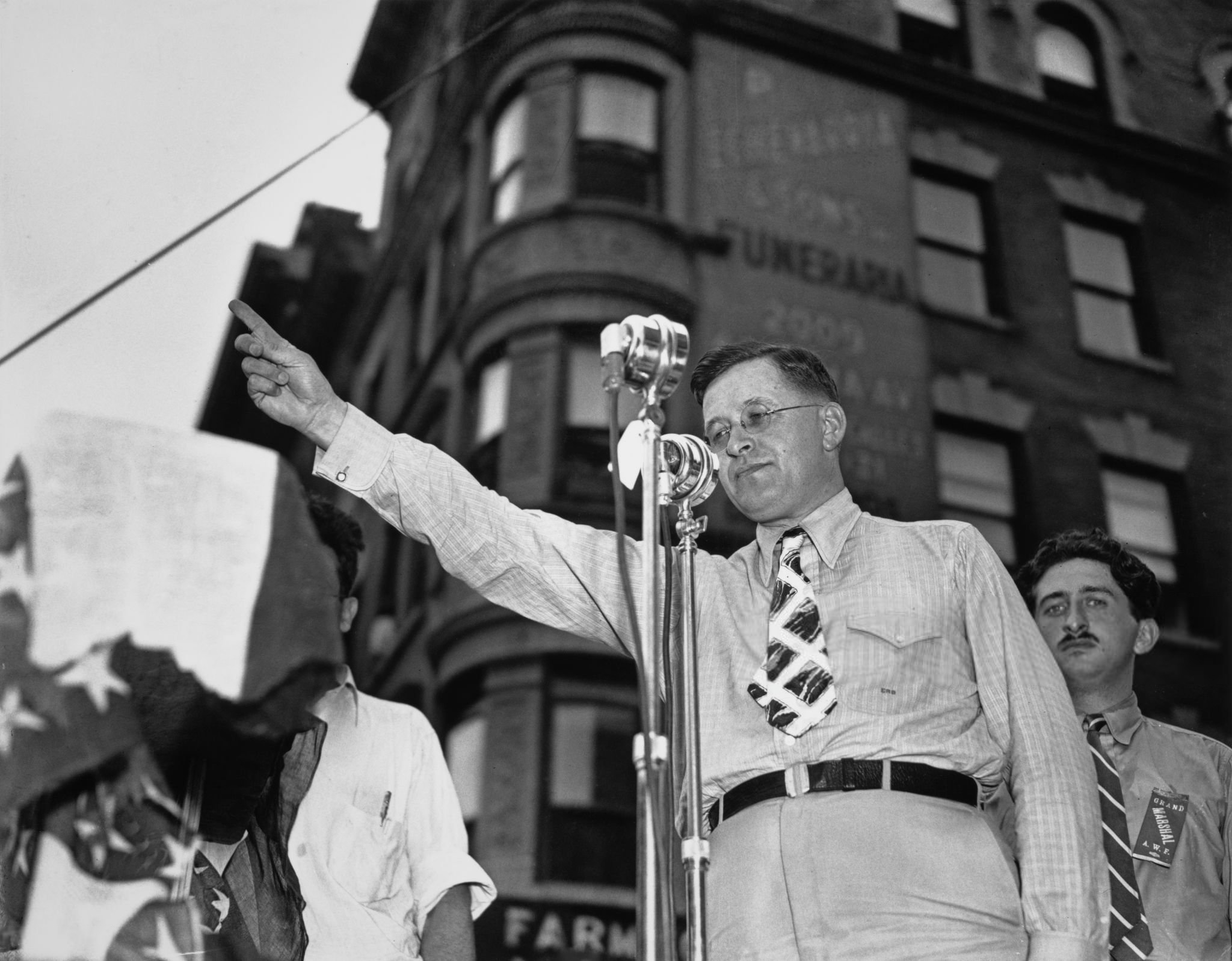
Benson addresses an American League Against War and Fascism rally in Harlem, New York, August 7, 1937

Benson's ambitious legislative agenda struggled against a conservative Minnesota Senate. His administration had to rely heavily on his executive power, which he used to protect workers to an unprecedented degree, providing food and shelter for striking timber workers, refusing to renew the license for the Pinkertons operation in the state, sending the Minnesota National Guard to protect striking newspaper workers, ordering the release of arrested striking workers in Albert Lea, and personally conducting labor negotiations.

Benson's former Wisconsin political allies Governor Philip La Follette and Senator Robert M. La Follette Jr. broke with him. The La Follettes has sought to unite the Farmer-Labor party with the Wisconsin Progressive Party into the National Progressives of America, with candidates already slated in Iowa. Benson rejected the union, resulting in the collapse of relations between the two.

While running for reelection in 1938, Benson faced serious primary opposition from Hjalmar Petersen, leader of the party's more moderate wing. Benson was renominated, but with only 51.91% of the primary vote. Roosevelt did not endorse him for a second term.

== Post-Governor ==
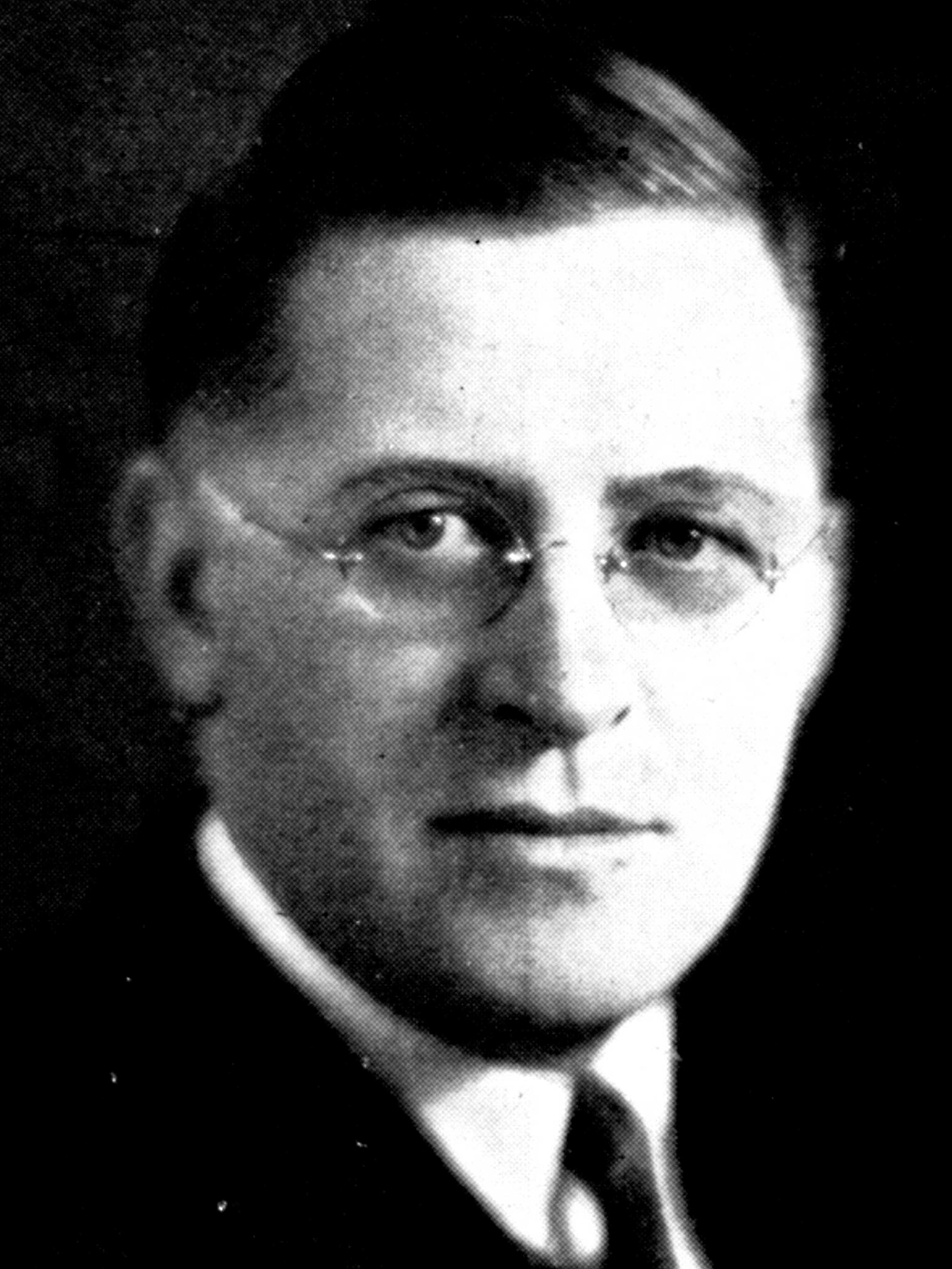
Benson c. 1938

In 1940, Benson ran for the United States Senate against Henrik Shipstead, an incumbent senator who defected from the Farmer-Labor Party to join the Republicans. Benson took second place, receiving 25% of the vote, in a race that also involved a Democrat, while Shipstead was reelected. Benson ran for the Senate for the last time in 1942, losing to Republican Joseph H. Ball in a four-way race.

=== DFL Party ===
Benson was also the chief figure behind a schism within the DFL Party in Minnesota between 1946 and 1948. The DFL (Democratic-Farmer-Labor Party) had been created in 1944 with the merging of the Minnesota Democratic Party and the Farmer-Labor Party. Benson and his supporters actively took control of the party's main committee in 1946, but were displaced by the supporters of Hubert H. Humphrey (then the mayor of Minneapolis) in 1948. The influence of Humphrey and his supporters had grown significantly within the party between 1946 and 1948 due to Humphrey's popularity and his work through the ADA, the state farm co-ops, and support from the national arm of the CIO. Humphrey's group of supporters—which included such future DFL political stars as Arthur Naftalin, Orville Freeman, and Walter Mondale—wrested control of the DFL from Benson's supporters at a February 1948 party convention. Humphrey's later successful Senate campaign signaled a significant victory for his faction within the fledgling DFL Party and the defeat of Benson's candidates in the DFL primaries. The 1948 schism eventually led Benson and his supporters to leave the DFL.

== Death ==
Before ill health drove him from the public arena, Benson became a force within the short-lived Progressive Party, managing the 1948 presidential campaign of its candidate, Henry A. Wallace. After Wallace's defeat, Benson served as national chair of the Progressive Party until August 1951, when he was forced to retire due to encephalitis. Benson died in 1985 in Minneapolis, and is buried at the Appleton Cemetery in the town of his birth, Appleton, Minnesota.

Party political offices
Preceded by Floyd B. Olson	Farmer–Labor nominee for Governor of Minnesota; 1936, 1938	Succeeded by Hjalmar Petersen
Preceded by Henrik Shipstead	Farmer–Labor nominee for U.S. Senator from Minnesota (Class 1); 1940	Succeeded by Theodore Jorgenson; Democratic–Farmer–Labor
Preceded by Al Hansen	Farmer–Labor nominee for U.S. Senator from Minnesota (Class 2); 1942	Succeeded by Hubert Humphrey; Democratic–Farmer–Labor
U.S. Senate
Preceded by Thomas D. Schall	U.S. senator (Class 2) from Minnesota; 1935–1936; Served alongside: Henrik Shipstead	Succeeded by Guy V. Howard
Political offices
Preceded by Hjalmar Petersen	Governor of Minnesota; 1937–1939	Succeeded by Harold Stassen
Honorary titles
Preceded by F. Ryan Duffy	Most senior living U.S. senator (Sitting or former); August 16, 1979 – March 13, 1985	Succeeded by Claude Pepper
