= 1934 Minnesota gubernatorial election =

- November 6, 1934
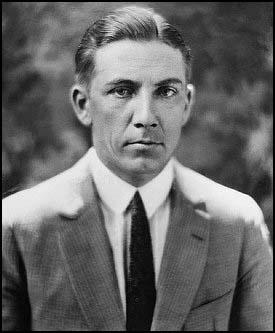

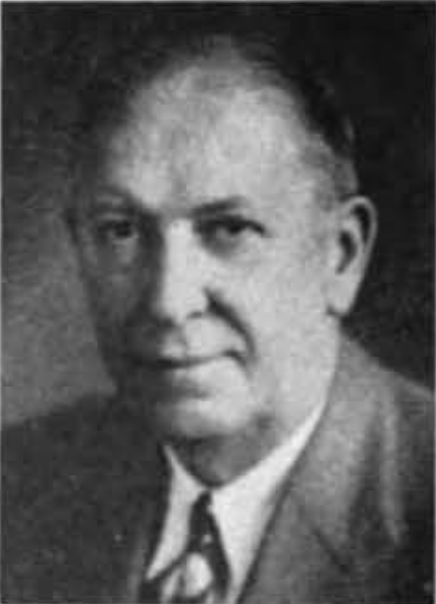

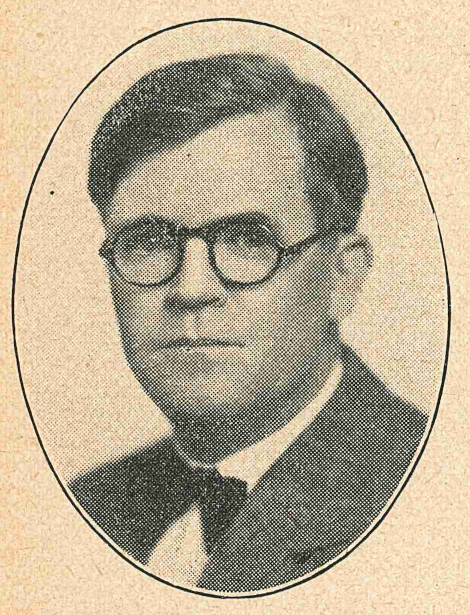
Nominee	Floyd B. Olson	Martin A. Nelson	John E. Regan
Party	Farmer–Labor	Republican	Democratic
Popular vote	468,812	396,359	176,928
Percentage	44.61%	37.72%	16.84%
- County results Olson: 40–50% 50–60% 60–70% Nelson: 30–40% 40–50% 50–60% Regan: 30–40% 40–50% 50–60%
Governor before election
Floyd B. Olson
Farmer–Labor
Elected Governor
Floyd B. Olson
Farmer–Labor

The 1934 Minnesota gubernatorial election took place on November 6, 1934. Farmer-Labor candidate Floyd B. Olson defeated Republican challenger Martin A. Nelson and returning Democratic challenger John E. Regan, who had previously run against him in 1932. The election took place during the Great Depression.

== Farmer-Labor primary ==
The Farmer-Labor Ppimary election was held on June 18, 1933. Floyd Olson was renominated for a third term. Olson was challenged by John Lind III, who had no known relation to previous governor John Lind.

=== Candidates ===
==== Nominated ====
- Floyd B. Olson, incumbent

=== Eliminated in primary ===
- John Lind III, farmer

=== Results ===
Farmer-Labor Party of Minnesota primary results
Party	Candidate	Votes	%
Farmer–Labor	Floyd B. Olson	238,821	87.77%
Farmer–Labor	John Lind III	33,268	12.23%
Total votes		272,089	100%

== Republican primary ==
The Republican primary was held on June 18, 1934. Martin A. Nelson won the primary.

=== Candidates ===
==== Nominated ====
- Martin A. Nelson, attorney

=== Eliminated in primary ===
- Edgar Bernard, farmer
- Arthur B. Gilbert, president of the Recovery League of Minnesota
- Knute Sandum, newspaper publisher

=== Results ===
Republican Party of Minnesota primary results
Party	Candidate	Votes	%
Republican	Martin A. Nelson	117,893	73.50%
Republican	Arthur B. Gilbert	17,536	10.93%
Republican	Edgar Bernard	13,524	8.43%
Republican	Knute Sandum	11,442	7.13%
Total votes		160,395	100%

== Democratic primary ==
The Democratic primary was a crowded battle among eight candidates. John E. Regan, who was the Democratic nominee in 1932, won his second primary.

=== Nominated ===
- John E. Regan, former member of the Minnesota House of Representatives

=== Eliminated in primary ===
- Silas M. Bryan, attorney
- Matthew F. Eusterman, dentist
- James Hegland, harness maker
- Joseph J. Moriarty, former member of the Minnesota House of Representatives, former mayor of Shakopee, Minnesota
- Albert Pfaender, member of the Minnesota House of Representatives
- Fred Schilplin, newspaper editor
- Oliver Skellet, transfer company manager

=== Results ===
Democratic Party of Minnesota primary results
Party	Candidate	Votes	%
Democratic	John E. Regan	91,076	34.62%
Democratic	Fred Schilplin	68,649	26.10%
Democratic	Albert Pfaender	39,386	14.97%
Democratic	Oliver Skellet	24,923	9.47%
Democratic	Silas M. Bryan	16,539	6.29%
Democratic	Joseph J. Moriarty	9,239	3.51%
Democratic	James Hegland	7,733	2.94%
Democratic	Matthew F. Eusterman	5,504	2.09%
Total votes		263,049	100%

== Candidates ==
- Samuel K. Davis, journalist (Communist)
- Martin A. Nelson, attorney (Republican)
- Floyd B. Olson, incumbent (Farmer-Labor)
- John E. Regan, former member of the Minnesota House of Representatives (Democrat)
- Arthur C. Townley, founder of the National Non-Partisan League

== Campaigns ==
Early in the campaign, in March of 1934, Olson declared himself a Radical, not a Liberal, as many had attempted to frame him. Amid accusations of being a Communist, he stated that he was not a Communist, nor was Communism an immediate threat to the United States or Minnesota. Olson argued that if any ideology should be of concern, it should be Fascism. A journalist of the time mocked Olson, saying that if there was a real threat of fascism, Olson was the only person who knew about it. Olson was unable to dispel the ideological concerns of his most vocal critics.

Olson criticized those who opposed his policies, notably calling out State Senators Anton J. Rockne, J. V. Weber and Claude MacKenzie for opposing a $5,000,000 relief bill, stating, "These men were willing to play politics with human misery."

Townley's campaign was considered hopeful for the Republicans, since it was thought that Olson's voter base would be split to their advantage. Townley was running on a more moderate Farmer-Labor platform.

=== Straw vote ===
This election was the second gubernatorial election in Minnesota in which a straw poll was conducted. Despite a large sample size, the straw poll massively over-predicted Nelson's performance, as the previous one in 1932 had over-predicted the performance of then-nominee Earle Brown.

Poll source	Date(s) administered	Sample size	Margin of error	Floyd Olson (FL)	Floyd B. Nelson (R)	John E. Regan (D)
Pioneer Press and Dispatch	October 6, 1934	109,156	–	30%	43%	27%

== Results ==
1934 gubernatorial election, Minnesota
Party	Candidate	Votes	%	±%
Farmer–Labor	Floyd B. Olson (incumbent)	468,812	44.61%	−5.96%
Republican	Martin A. Nelson	396,359	37.72%	+5.38%
Democratic	John E. Regan	176,928	16.84%	+0.39%
Independent	Arthur C. Townley	4,454	0.42%	n/a
Communist	Samuel K. Davis	4,334	0.41%	−0.05%
Majority		72,453	6.89%	
Turnout		1,050,887		
Farmer–Labor hold		Swing		

== See also ==
- List of Minnesota gubernatorial elections
