= Grace Carlson =

American politician (1906–1992)

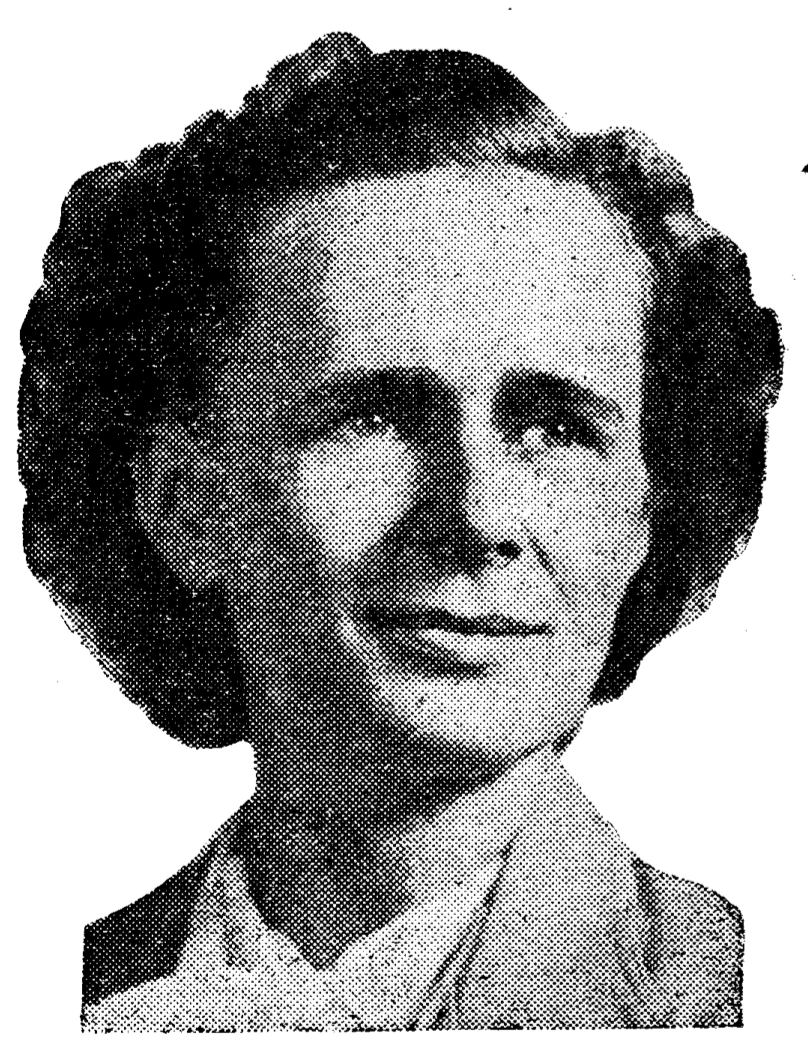
- Born: November 13, 1906; Saint Paul, Minnesota, U.S.
- Died: July 7, 1992 (aged 85)
- Occupations: Politician; professor
- Political party: Socialist Workers Party

Grace Holmes Carlson (November 13, 1906 – July 7, 1992) was an American Marxist politician.

== Background ==
Grace Holmes Carlson was born on November 13, 1906, in Saint Paul, Minnesota, and studied in local Catholic schools.

== Career ==
Carlson was a professor of psychology at the University of Minnesota. In 1940, Carlson was the Socialist Workers Party candidate for United States Senator in Minnesota, receiving almost 9,000 votes. In 1941, as a leading member of the Socialist Workers Party she was imprisoned under the Smith Act together with Farrell Dobbs and many other SWP leaders for opposing the US involvement in World War II. After her 16-month prison sentence, she became an activist for better conditions for women prisoners.

In 1948, Carlson ran as the Socialist Workers Party vice presidential candidate in presidential election with Dobbs as presidential candidate. In 1950, she ran again as a U.S. House of Representatives candidate for Minnesota's 5th district 1950.

In 1952, Carlson left the SWP, citing conflict with her Catholic beliefs. James P. Cannon, the central leader of the SWP famously penned the article "How We Won Grace Carlson and How We Lost Her" following her resignation; it focused on the extreme right-wing pressures of the McCarthy period as the material basis for Carlson's departure.

== Death ==
Grace Carlson died age 85 on July 7, 1992.

== See also ==
- Socialist Workers Party (United States)
- Farrell Dobbs
- James P. Cannon

Preceded by —	Socialist Workers Party nominee for Vice President of the United States; 1948	Succeeded by Myra Tanner Weiss
