= Martin A. Nelson =

American judge

Martin Nelson
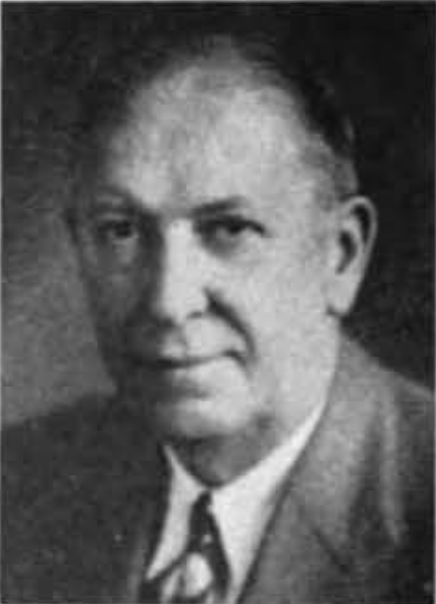

Associate Justice of the Minnesota Supreme Court
- In office 1953–1972
- Appointed by: C. Elmer Anderson
- Preceded by: Roger L. Dell

Personal details
- Born: February 21, 1889 Hesper Township, Winneshiek County, Iowa, U.S.
- Died: May 22, 1979 (aged 90) St. Paul, Minnesota, U.S.
- Party: Republican
- Other political affiliations: Independent (1942)
- Education: St. Paul College of Law (LLB)

Military service
- Battles/wars: World War I

Martin A. Nelson (February 21, 1889 – May 22, 1979) was an American attorney, politician, and jurist from Minnesota. He served as an associate justice of the Minnesota Supreme Court.

== Early life and education ==
Nelson was born in Hesper Township, Winneshiek County, Iowa and received his early education there. He later moved to Minnesota and earned his law degree from William Mitchell College of Law (then the St. Paul College of Law) in 1916.

== Career ==
Nelson practiced law in St. Paul, Minnesota, prior to his enlistment. During World War I, Nelson served as an aviator and aviation instructor at American air training fields. From 1919 to 1944, he practiced law at Austin, Minnesota. He served as a trustee of St. Olaf Hospital in Austin for 22 years including 10 years as board president. He was a delegate to the Republican National Conventions in 1928 and 1932.

Nelson obtained the Republican gubernatorial nomination in 1934 and 1936, but lost both general elections to Floyd B. Olson and Elmer A. Benson, respectively. In 1942, he was an independent candidate for the United States Senate from Minnesota, receiving 14.4% of the vote and coming in third place. In 1944, he was appointed a state court district judge in Austin, Minnesota. Governor C. Elmer Anderson appointed him to the Minnesota Supreme Court in 1953, to fill a vacancy caused by the elevation of Roger L. Dell to be chief justice. He served until his retirement in 1972. Nelson's fight to remain on the court despite his advanced age (he finally retired at eighty-two) spawned the law mandating retirement for state judges at the age of seventy.

Party political offices
Preceded by Earle Brown	Republican nominee for Governor of Minnesota; 1934, 1936	Succeeded by Harold Stassen
