= 1920 Minnesota lieutenant gubernatorial election =

Minnesota lieutenant gubernatorial election, 1920
- November 2, 1920
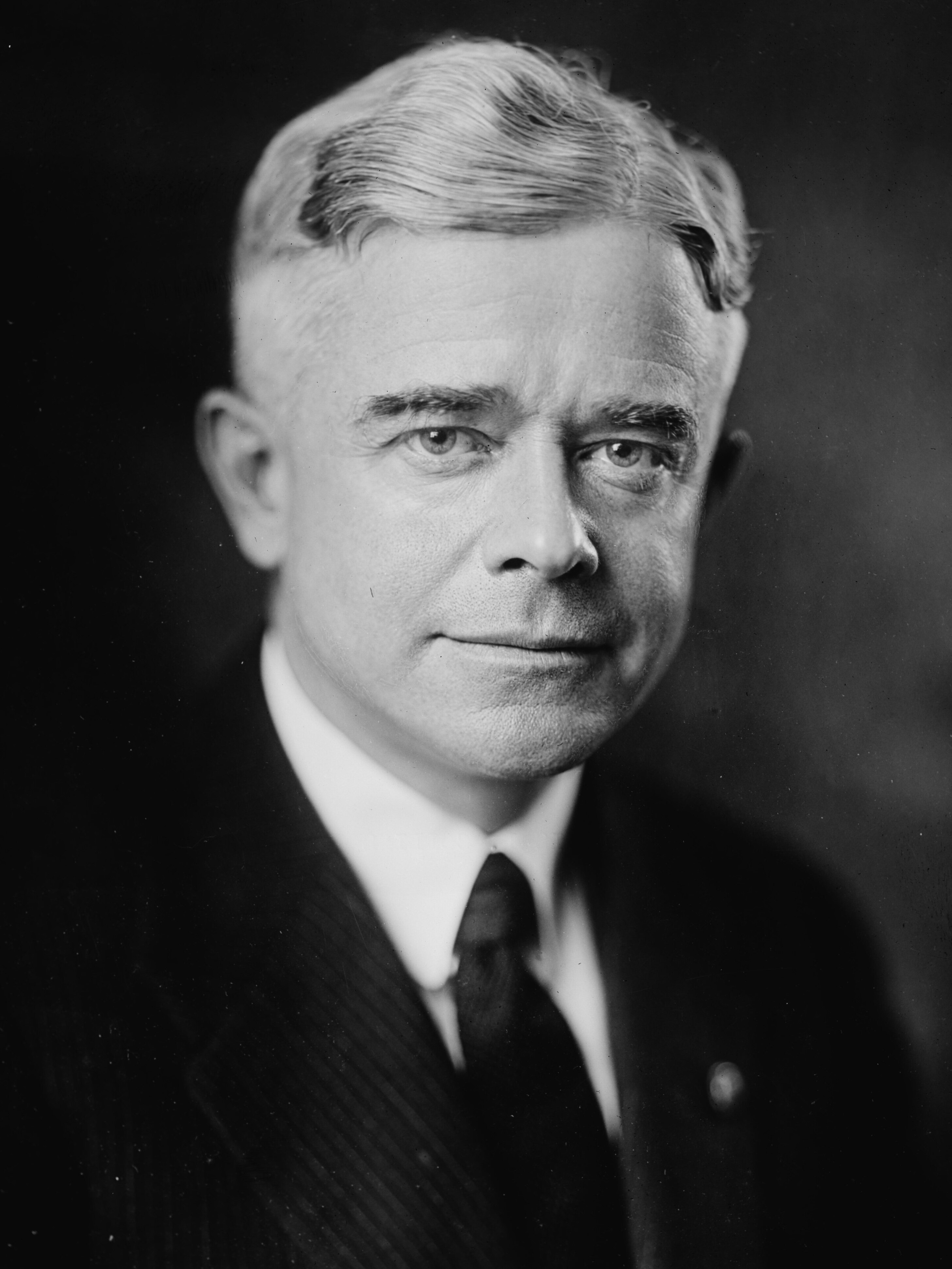

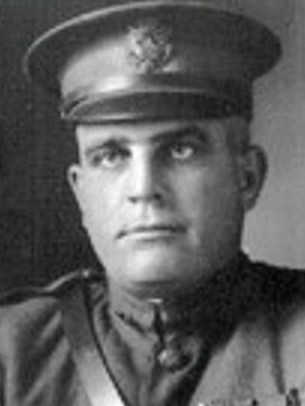

Nominee	Louis L. Collins	George H. Mallon	James P. McDonnell
Party	Republican	Independent	Democratic
Popular vote	432,226	224,601	79,414
Percentage	57.36%	29.81%	10.54%
- County results Collins: 30–40% 40–50% 50–60% 60–70% 70–80% Mallon: 40–50% 50–60%
Lieutenant Governor before election
Thomas Frankson
Republican
Elected Lieutenant Governor
Louis L. Collins
Republican

The 1920 Minnesota lieutenant gubernatorial election took place on November 2, 1920. Republican Party of Minnesota candidate Louis L. Collins defeated Independent challenger George H. Mallon and Minnesota Democratic Party candidate James P. McDonnell.

Mallon was the nominee of the young Minnesota Farmer-Labor Party. However, the Farmer-Labor nominees for governor and lieutenant governor in the general election of 1920 were unable to use the Farmer-Labor party designation, and ran as independents instead.

Also among the defeated candidates was Lillian Friedman of the Socialist Party of Minnesota, who was the first woman ever to be nominated for the office of lieutenant governor of Minnesota, and the final nominee of the Socialist Party for that office. The 1920 general election—the first held since the ratification of the 19th Amendment—also saw the first nomination of a woman for the office of Minnesota secretary of state: Lily J. Anderson of the Farmer-Labor Party.

== Results ==
1920 lieutenant gubernatorial election, Minnesota
Party	Candidate	Votes	%	±%
Republican	Louis L. Collins	432,226	57.36%	−1.04%
Independent	George H. Mallon	272,669	29.81%	n/a
Democratic	James P. McDonnell	79,414	10.54%	−18.04%
Socialist	Lillian Friedman	10,629	1.41%	n/a
National	C. H. Hubbell	6,695	0.89%	−12.13%
Majority		159,557	27.55%	
Turnout		753,565		
Republican hold		Swing		
