= William I. Nolan =

American politician

William Ignatius Nolan
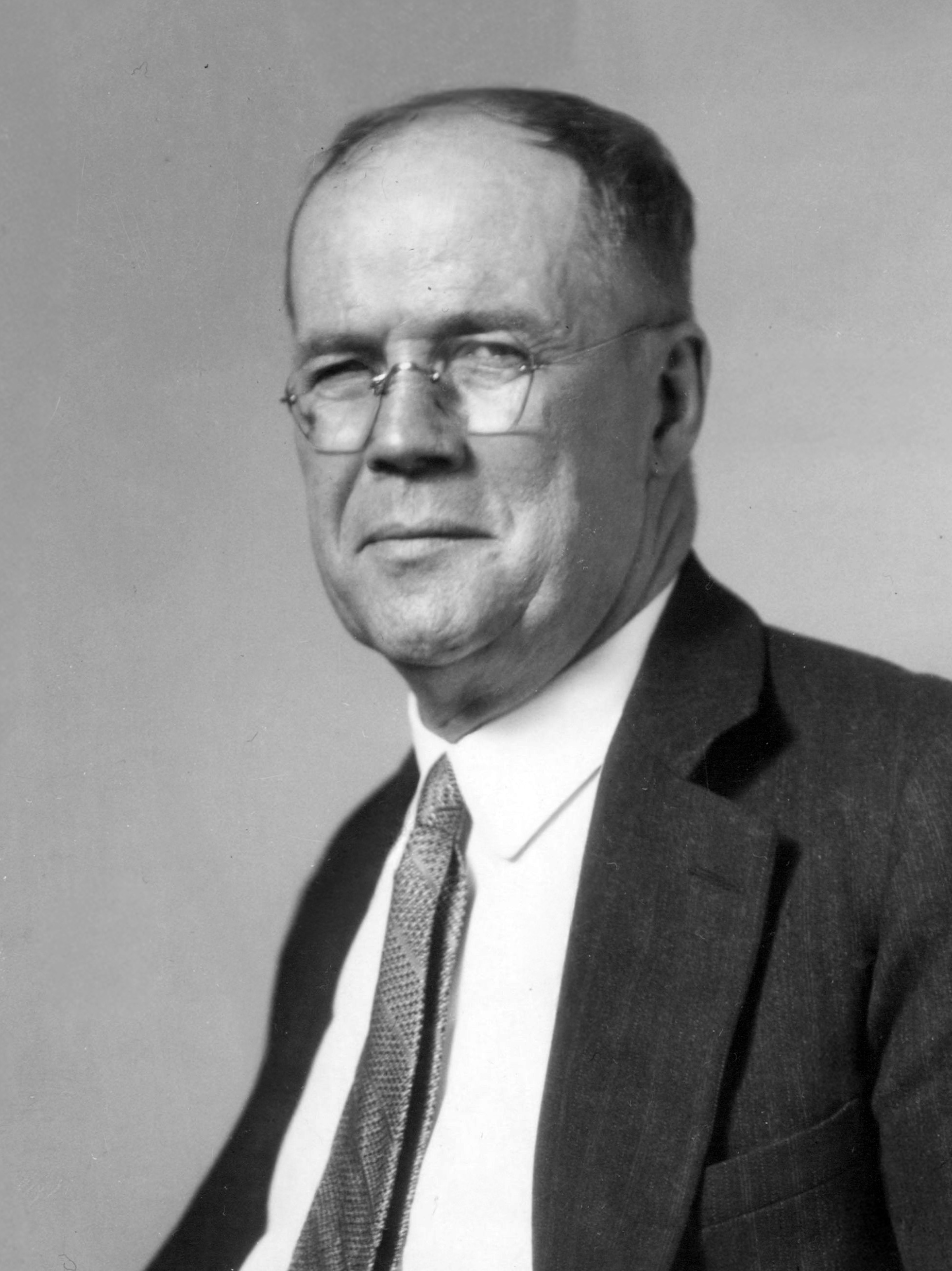
- Nolan in 1929

Member of the U.S. House of Representatives from Minnesota's 5th district
- In office July 17, 1929 – March 3, 1933
- Preceded by: Walter Newton
- Succeeded by: Theodore Christianson

24th Lieutenant Governor of Minnesota
- In office January 5, 1925 – June 25, 1929
- Governor: Theodore Christianson
- Preceded by: Louis L. Collins
- Succeeded by: Charles Edward Adams

34th Speaker of the Minnesota House of Representatives
- In office January 7, 1919 – January 4, 1925
- Preceded by: Ralph J. Parker
- Succeeded by: John A. Johnson

Member of the Minnesota House of Representatives
- In office January 1, 1917 – January 4, 1925
- Preceded by: Paul Willis Guilford; John A. Larimore
- Succeeded by: Willis I. Norton
- Constituency: 33rd district
- In office January 2, 1911 – January 3, 1915 Serving with Livingston A.Lydiard
- Preceded by: Lawrence Henry Johnson; Carleton Lyman Wallace
- Succeeded by: Henry H. Harrison; Carl G. Malmberg
- Constituency: 43rd district
- In office January 5, 1903 – January 3, 1909
- Preceded by: James A. Peterson; Jay W. Phillips
- Succeeded by: William A. Campbell; John B. Goodspeed
- Constituency: 42nd district

Minnesota House Majority Leader
- In office 1913–1915
- Preceded by: Henry Rines
- Succeeded by: Thomas H. Girling

Personal details
- Born: May 14, 1874 Saint Paul, Minnesota, U.S.
- Died: August 3, 1943 (aged 69) Winona, Minnesota, U.S.
- Resting place: Lakewood Cemetery
- Party: Republican
- Spouse: Matea E. Solem (m. 1894)
- Profession: lecturer, politician

William Ignatius Nolan (May 14, 1874 – August 3, 1943) was a politician from the U.S. State of Minnesota. He represented the state in the U.S. House of Representatives.

Nolan was born in Saint Paul, Minnesota and served in the Minnesota National Guard from 1891 to 1896.

He was member of the Minnesota House of Representatives from 1903 to 1907, 1911–1913, and 1917–1923, serving as speaker from 1919–1923, defeating the Nonpartisan League candidate John A. Urness at the start of the 41st Minnesota Legislature. He was the 24th lieutenant governor of Minnesota from 1925–1929. Nolan was the chairman of the Minnesota Reforestation Commission in 1927.

Nolan was elected as a Republican to the 71st congress to fill the vacancy caused by the resignation of Walter Newton. Nolan was reelected to the 72nd congress and served from July 17, 1929, to March 4, 1933. He was an unsuccessful candidate for reelection in 1932 to the 73rd congress and continued to be an unsuccessful candidate for nomination in 1934, 1936, and 1938. Nolan resumed his profession as a lecturer. He was elected State railroad and warehouse commissioner in 1942 and served until his death in Winona, Minnesota. He was buried in Lakewood Cemetery.

Party political offices
Preceded by Louis L. Collins	Republican nominee for Lieutenant Governor of Minnesota; 1924, 1926, 1928	Succeeded by John H. Hougen
Political offices
Preceded by Louis L. Collins	Lieutenant Governor of Minnesota; 1925 – 1929	Succeeded by Charles Edward Adams
Preceded by Ralph J. Parker	Speaker of the Minnesota House of Representatives; 1919 – 1925	Succeeded by John A. Johnson
Preceded by Henry Rines	Minnesota House Majority Leader; 1913 – 1915	Succeeded by Thomas H. Girling
U.S. House of Representatives
Preceded by Walter Newton	U.S. Representative from Minnesota's 5th congressional district 1929 – 1933	Succeeded by At large on a General ticket: Henry M. Arens, Ray P. Chase, Theodore Christianson, Einar Hoidale, Magnus Johnson, Harold Knutson, Paul John Kvale, Ernest Lundeen, Francis Shoemaker
