= 1924 Minnesota lieutenant gubernatorial election =

Minnesota lieutenant gubernatorial election, 1924
- November 4, 1924
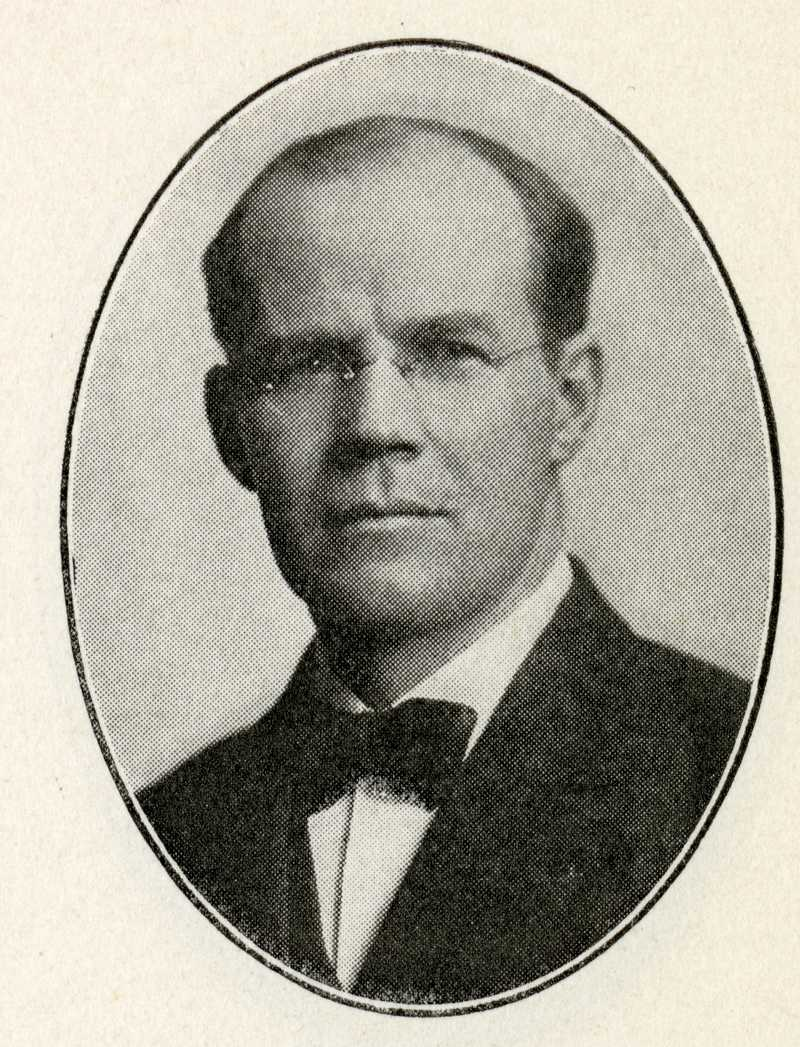

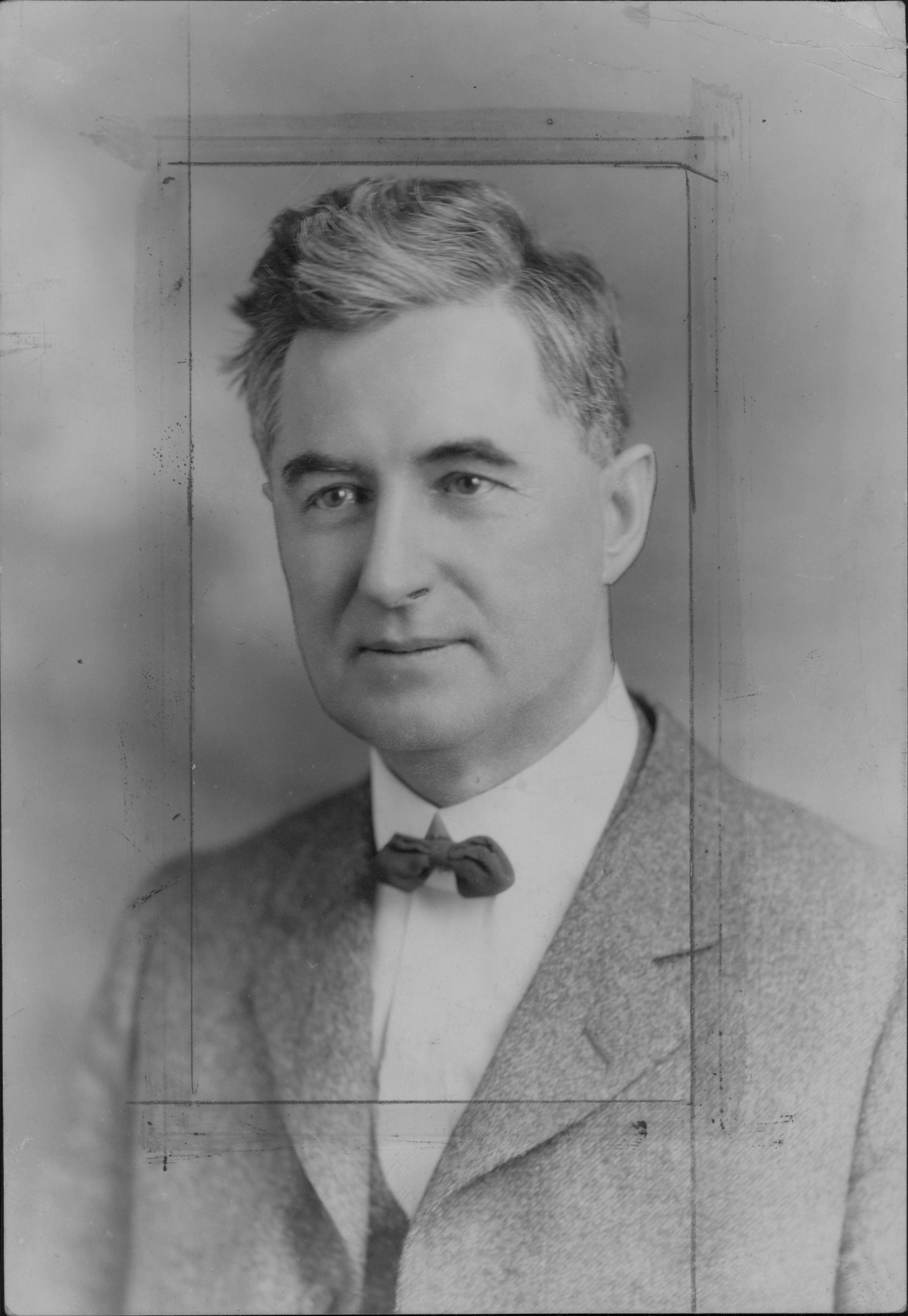
Nominee	William I. Nolan	Emil E. Holmes	Fred Schilplin
Party	Republican	Farmer–Labor	Democratic
Popular vote	409,933	345,633	50,330
Percentage	50.87%	42.89%	6.25%
- County results Nolan: 40–50% 50–60% 60–70% Holmes: 40–50% 50–60% 60–70%
Lieutenant Governor before election
Louis L. Collins
Republican
Elected Lieutenant Governor
William I. Nolan
Republican

The 1924 Minnesota lieutenant gubernatorial election took place on November 4, 1924. Republican Party of Minnesota candidate William I. Nolan defeated Minnesota Farmer–Labor Party challenger Emil E. Holmes and Minnesota Democratic Party candidate Fred Schilplin.

== Results ==
1924 lieutenant gubernatorial election, Minnesota
Party	Candidate	Votes	%	±%
Republican	William I. Nolan	409,933	50.87%	+2.09%
Farmer–Labor	Emil E. Holmes	345,633	42.89%	+2.01%
Democratic	Fred Schilplin	50,330	6.25%	−4.09%
Majority		64,300	7.98%	
Turnout		805,896		
Republican hold		Swing		
