= 1930 Minnesota lieutenant gubernatorial election =

Minnesota lieutenant gubernatorial election, 1930
- November 6, 1930
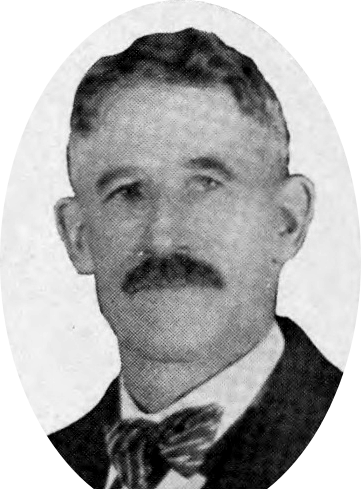

Nominee	Henry M. Arens	John H. Hougen
Party	Farmer–Labor	Republican
Popular vote	345,225	326,751
Percentage	50.32%	47.63%
Lieutenant Governor before election
Charles Edward Adams
Republican
Elected Lieutenant Governor
Konrad K. Solberg
Farmer–Labor

The 1930 Minnesota lieutenant gubernatorial election took place on November 6, 1930. Minnesota Farmer–Labor Party candidate Henry M. Arens defeated Republican Party of Minnesota challenger John H. Hougen.

== Results ==
1930 lieutenant gubernatorial election, Minnesota
Party	Candidate	Votes	%	±%
Farmer–Labor	Henry M. Arens	345,225	50.32%	+25.36%
Republican	John H. Hougen	326,751	47.63%	−8.25%
Communist	Arne Roine	14,089	2.05%	n/a
Majority		18,474	2.69%	
Turnout		686,065		
Farmer–Labor gain from Republican		Swing		
