= Ralph J. Parker =

American politician

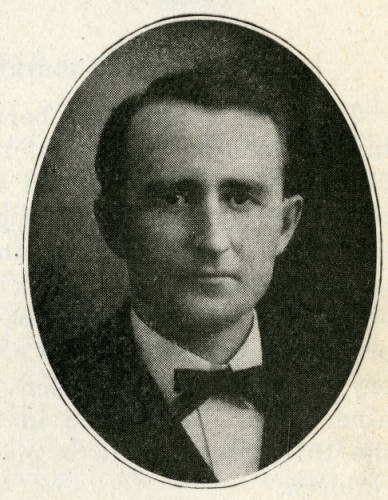
- Portrait of Ralph J. Parker, 1915.

33rd Speaker of the Minnesota House of Representatives
- In office January 1917 – January 1919
- Preceded by: H.H. Flowers
- Succeeded by: William I. Nolan

Minnesota State Representative from the 1st District
- In office January 5, 1915 – December 27, 1922

Judge for Minnesota's 10th District
- In office December 22, 1922 – December 27, 1922

Personal details
- Born: December 17, 1867 Frankford Township, Minnesota, U.S.
- Died: December 27, 1922 (aged 55) Rochester, Minnesota, U.S.
- Party: Nonpartisan (Conservative Caucus)
- Education: University of Minnesota
- Profession: Lawyer

Ralph J. Parker (December 17, 1867 – December 27, 1922) was a Minnesota politician and a Speaker of the Minnesota House of Representatives.

== Life and career ==
Parker was born in Frankford Township, Minnesota, to W. H. and Hannah Parker. He attended local schools before enrolling in the University of Minnesota Law School, graduating in 1890. He then moved to Spring Valley, Minnesota, where began to practice law and would live for the remainder of his life.

Parker served as county attorney for Fillmore County, Minnesota, from 1903 to 1909. He was elected to the Minnesota House of Representatives in 1914 where he served four total terms as a representative from 1915 to 1922. From 1917 to 1919 he served as speaker.

In 1922, Parker was elected as the judge for the 10th Minnesota District Court. His election was disputed by his opponent. While the dispute was being heard in court, Parker became ill and underwent surgery in Rochester, Minnesota. The dispute was dismissed and on December 22, 1922, he was sworn into office from his hospital bed. He died five days later on December 27.

Political offices
Preceded by H.H. Flowers	Speaker of the Minnesota House of Representatives; 1917–1919	Succeeded by William I. Nolan
