= John D. Jones (Minnesota politician) =

American politician

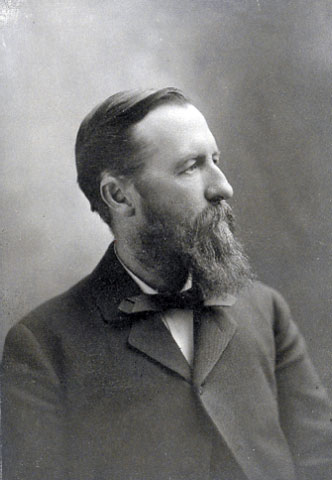

23rd Speaker of the Minnesota House of Representatives
- In office 1897–1899
- Preceded by: Samuel R. Van Sant
- Succeeded by: Arthur N. Dare

Personal details
- Born: 1849 Pennsylvania, U.S.
- Died: 1914 (aged 64–65)
- Party: Republican
- Education: Lewisburg University
- Profession: Lawyer

John D. Jones (1849–1914) was a Minnesota politician and Speaker of the Minnesota House of Representatives.

Jones was born in Pennsylvania. First elected to the Minnesota House of Representatives in 1894, he served two terms, becoming speaker in 1897. In 1898, Jones successfully ran for a seat in the Minnesota Senate, where he served until 1902.

Political offices
Preceded by Samuel R. Van Sant	Speaker of the Minnesota House of Representatives; 1897–1899	Succeeded by Arthur N. Dare
