= Michael J. Dowling (politician) =

American politician

Michael John Dowling
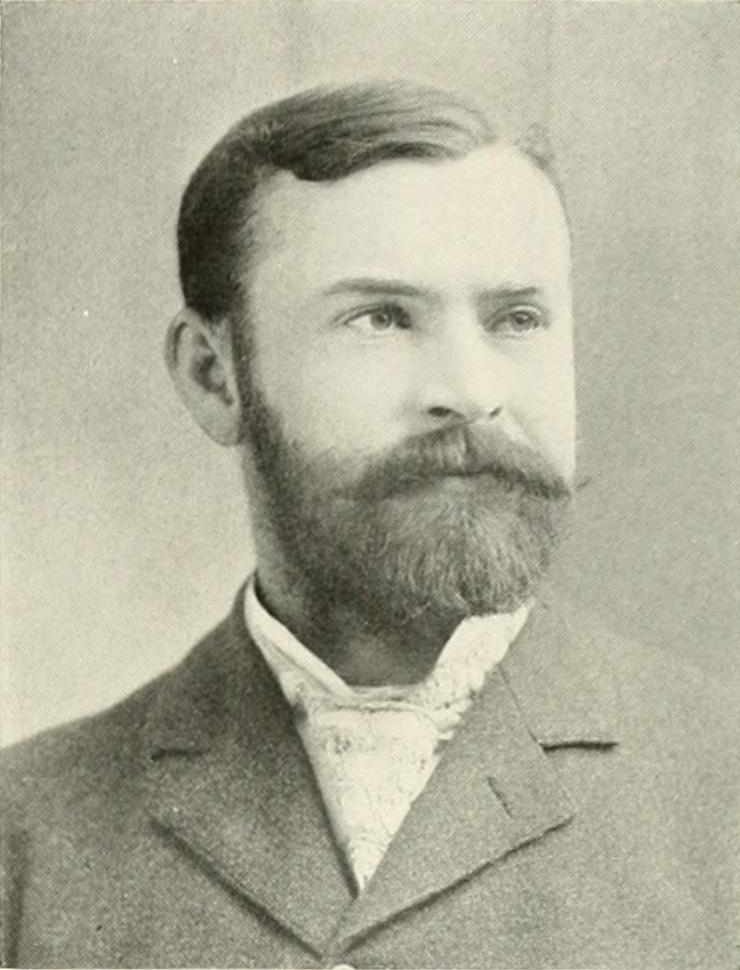

25th Speaker of the Minnesota House of Representatives
- In office January 8, 1901 – January 5, 1903
- Preceded by: Arthur N. Dare
- Succeeded by: Leverett W. Babcock

Minnesota State Representative from the 22nd district
- In office January 8, 1901 – January 5, 1903

Personal details
- Born: February 17, 1866 Huntington, Massachusetts, US
- Died: April 25, 1921
- Party: Republican
- Spouse: Jennie B. Dowling
- Profession: Newspaper publisher realtor

Michael John "M.J." Dowling (February 17, 1866 – April 25, 1921) was a Minnesota Republican politician and Speaker of the Minnesota House of Representatives.

== Life and career ==
Dowling was born in Huntington, Massachusetts. His family moved frequently while he was a child and he spent periods living in New York, Illinois, Iowa and Wisconsin before settling near Olivia, Minnesota. In 1880, Dowling suffered extreme frostbite when he was stranded outside during a blizzard. He lost parts of both legs, his left arm, and fingers on his right hand. For several years after he was a ward of the state.

In 1883, he made a deal with the county where he agreed to live independently if they paid for artificial limbs for his missing legs and arm. He attended Carleton College for a year and later worked as a school principal in Granite Falls, Minnesota and Renville, Minnesota. He was later involved in the newspaper business, insurance, and real estate in Olivia. He also became active in local Republican politics, serving as village recorder and mayor of Olivia as well as justice of the peace for Renville County, Minnesota.

Dowling served as an assistant clerk in the Minnesota State House of Representatives from 1892 to 1894 and as chief clerk from 1895 to 1898. He was elected to one term as a representative, serving from 1901 to 1903. He also served as speaker of the house during that term.

A short silent film of Dowling was made showing how he was able to live his life normally and go about his work despite his missing limbs. The film was shown at the 1918 American Medical Association conference and has been digitized.

Dowling died in 1921. Dowling School in Minneapolis, Minnesota is named in his honor.

== Papers ==
Papers of Michael J. Dowling are available for research use at the Minnesota Historical Society. They include newspaper and magazine articles, correspondence, printed materials, photographs, film recordings, and memorabilia.

Political offices
Preceded by Arthur N. Dare	Speaker of the Minnesota House of Representatives; 1901–1903	Succeeded by Leverett W. Babcock
