= Walter Newton =

American politician

Walter H. Newton
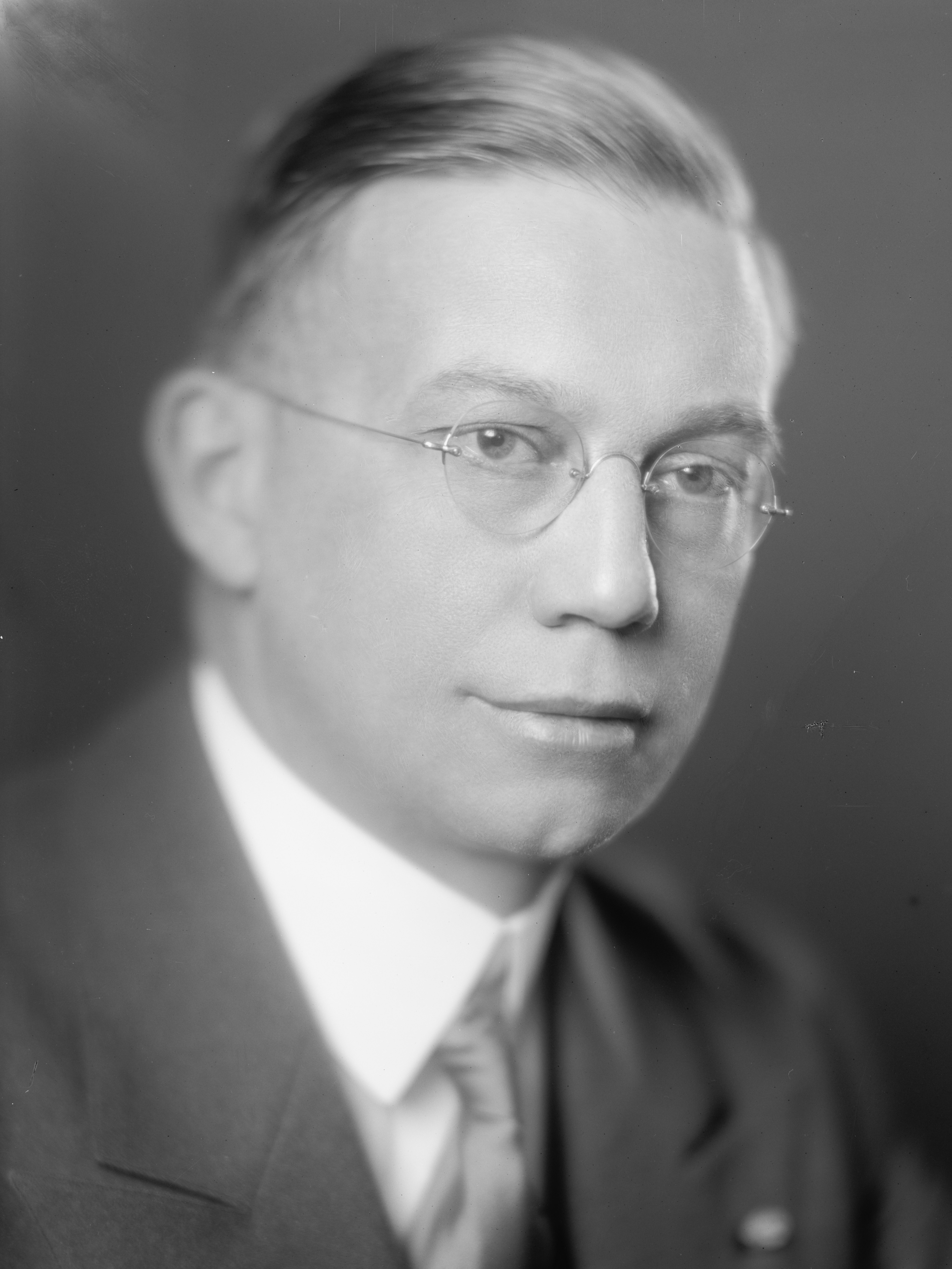

Secretary to the President
- In office July 1, 1929 – March 3, 1933
- President: Herbert Hoover
- Preceded by: Everett Sanders
- Succeeded by: Louis Howe

Member of the U.S. House of Representatives from Minnesota's 5th district
- In office March 4, 1919 – June 30, 1929
- Preceded by: Ernest Lundeen
- Succeeded by: William I. Nolan

Personal details
- Born: Walter Hughes Newton; October 10, 1880 Minneapolis, Minnesota, U.S.
- Died: August 10, 1941 (aged 60) Minneapolis, Minnesota. U.S.
- Resting place: Lakewood Cemetery
- Party: Republican

Walter Hughes Newton (October 10, 1880 – August 10, 1941) was a United States representative from Minnesota who also served in the Herbert Hoover administration as the secretary to the president.

== Early life and career ==
Newton was born in Minneapolis, Hennepin County, Minnesota; attended the public schools and was graduated from the law department of the University of Minnesota at Minneapolis in 1905; was admitted to the bar the same year and commenced practice in Minneapolis, Minnesota; first assistant prosecuting attorney of Hennepin County 1914 – 1918;

== Congress ==
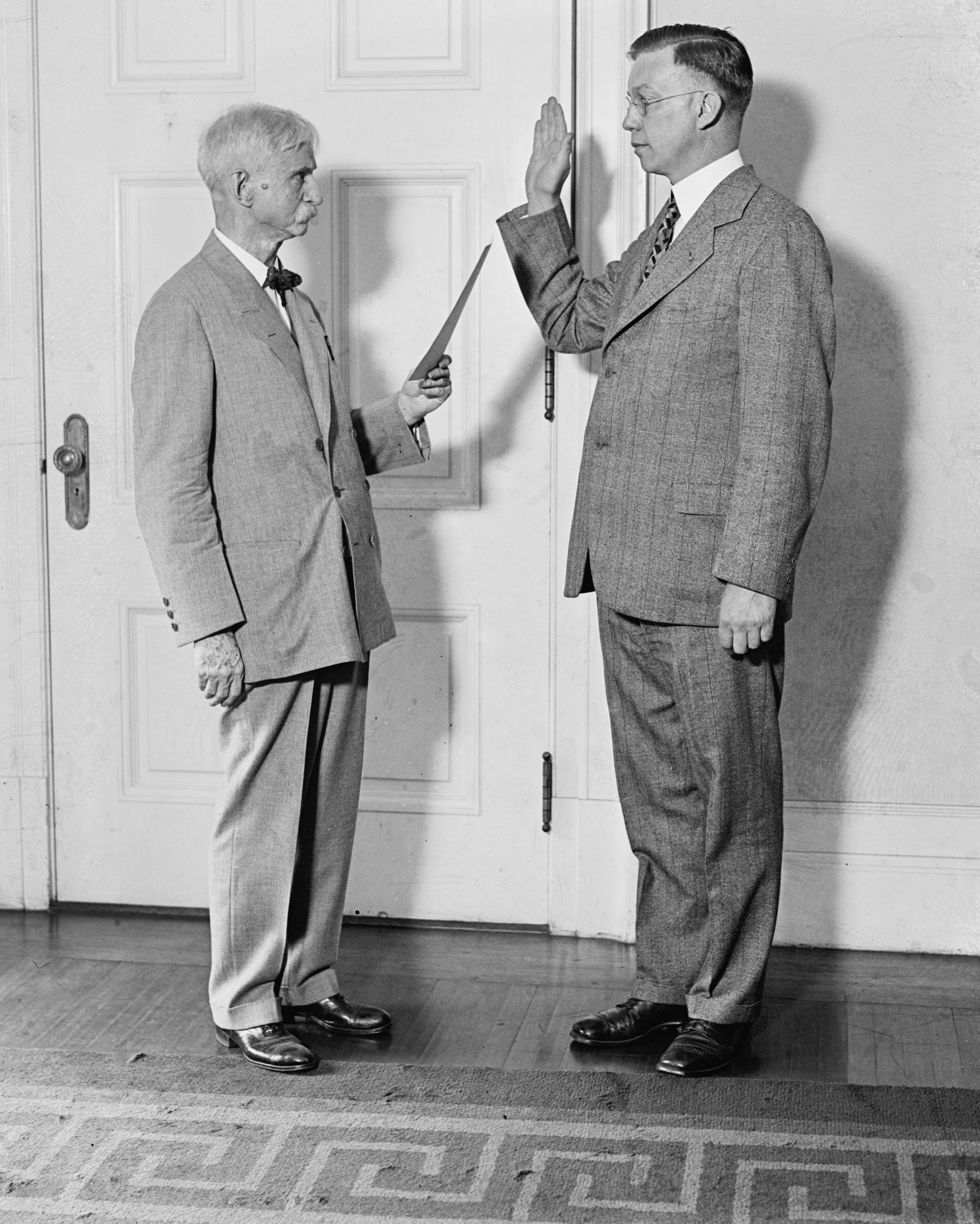
Newton (right) being sworn in as Secretary to the President on July 1, 1929

Newton was elected as a Republican to the 66th, 67th, 68th, 69th, 70th, and 71st congresses. He served from March 4, 1919, until his resignation on June 30, 1929.

Congress in 1928 and 1929 adopted what was known as the "Newton Bill," to divide the jurisdiction of the Eighth Circuit Court of Appeals, creating the Tenth Circuit, which sits in Denver. This was the first change in the geography of the federal courts since the present system of courts of appeals was created in 1891. The enormous Eighth Circuit had encompassed all the territory from the Mississippi (except Texas and part of Louisiana) almost to the states of the West Coast. Congressman Newton's plan resolved multiple disputes among the American Bar Association, the courts, and both Houses. Newton's solution was to divide the states along a North/South boundary, creating the Tenth Circuit as encompassing Oklahoma, Colorado, Wyoming, Utah and New Mexico, thereby leaving a somewhat unified grouping of Eighth Circuit states sharing the Mississippi/Missouri river system, from Minnesota and the Dakotas to Arkansas. The likeliest pre-Newton plan would have divided the circuit along a boundary from East to West.

== After Congress ==
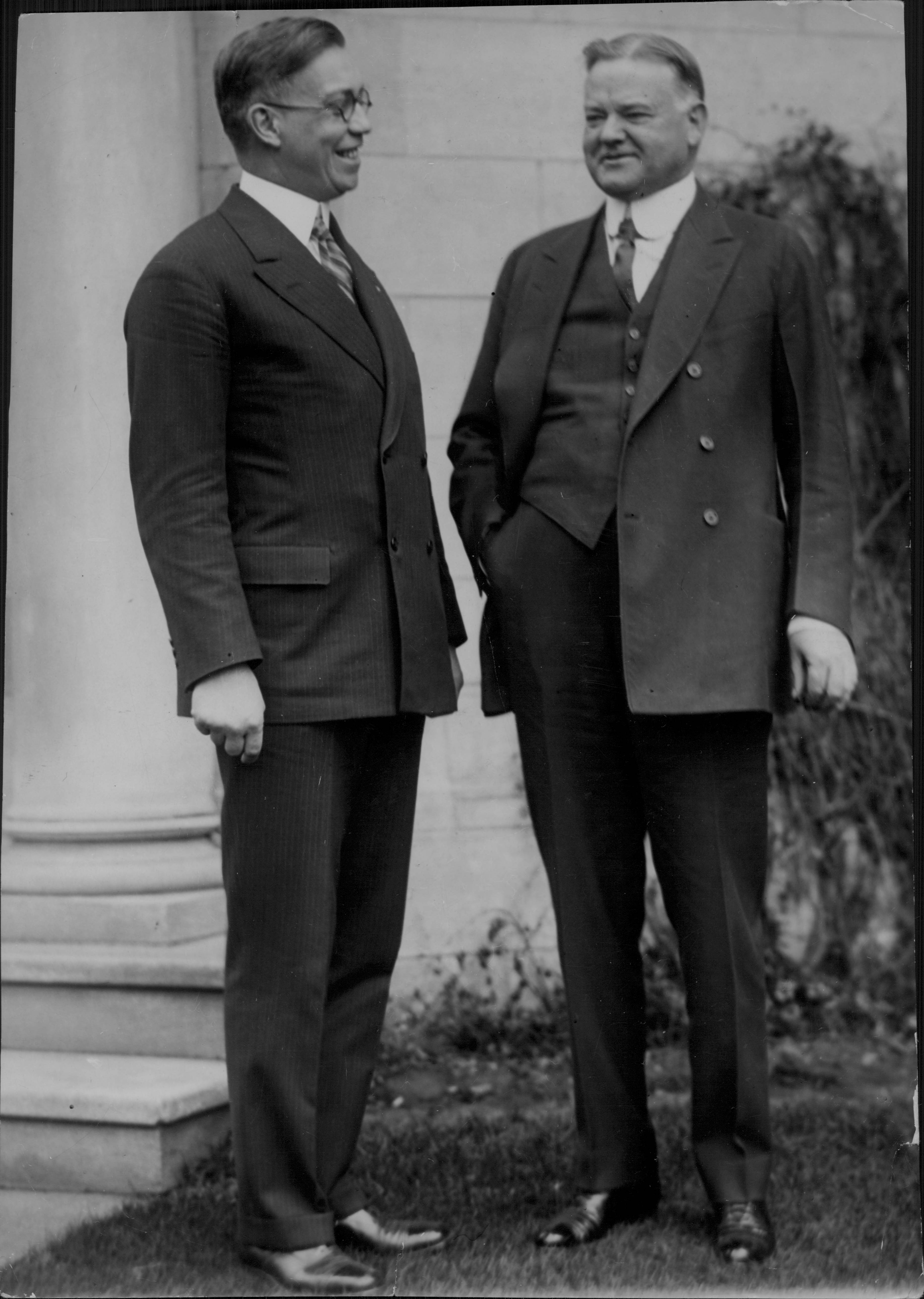
Newton with President Hoover at the Minneapolis Athletic Club

Newton left Congress upon his appointment as personal secretary to President Herbert Hoover. He served in that capacity until March 3, 1933; regent of the Smithsonian Institution; appointed a member of the Federal Home Loan Bank Board by President Franklin D. Roosevelt in 1933 and served until 1934 when he resumed the practice of law in Minneapolis, Minnesota; also engaged as an author; unsuccessful candidate for election in 1936 to the 75th Congress; appointed Federal Referee in Bankruptcy in 1938 and served until his death in Minneapolis, Minnesota, August 10, 1941; interment in Lakewood Cemetery.

== Sources ==
- United States Congress. "Walter Newton (id: N000079)". Biographical Directory of the United States Congress.

U.S. House of Representatives
Preceded by Ernest Lundeen	U.S. Representative from Minnesota's 5th congressional district 1919 – 1929	Succeeded by William I. Nolan
