= Leverett W. Babcock =

American politician

Leverett Wright Babcock
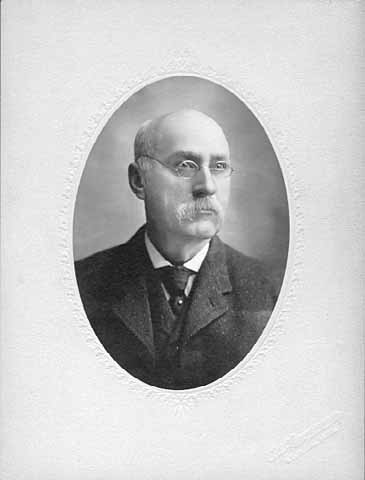

26th Speaker of the Minnesota House of Representatives
- In office 1903–1905
- Preceded by: Michael J. Dowling
- Succeeded by: Frank Clague

Minnesota State Representative
- In office 1899–1905

Personal details
- Born: 1840 New York
- Died: 1906 (aged 65–66)
- Party: Republican
- Education: University of Vermont
- Profession: Physician

Leverett Wright Babcock (1840–1906) was a Minnesota Republican politician and a Speaker of the Minnesota House of Representatives. Babcock, a physician, came to Minnesota in 1879. He served as village council president for Wadena, Minnesota for seven years, and was elected to the Minnesota House of Representatives in 1898. He served three terms, his last as speaker. Babcock died in 1906.

Political offices
Preceded by Michael J. Dowling	Speaker of the Minnesota House of Representatives; 1903–1905	Succeeded by Frank Clague
