= Frank Clague =

American politician

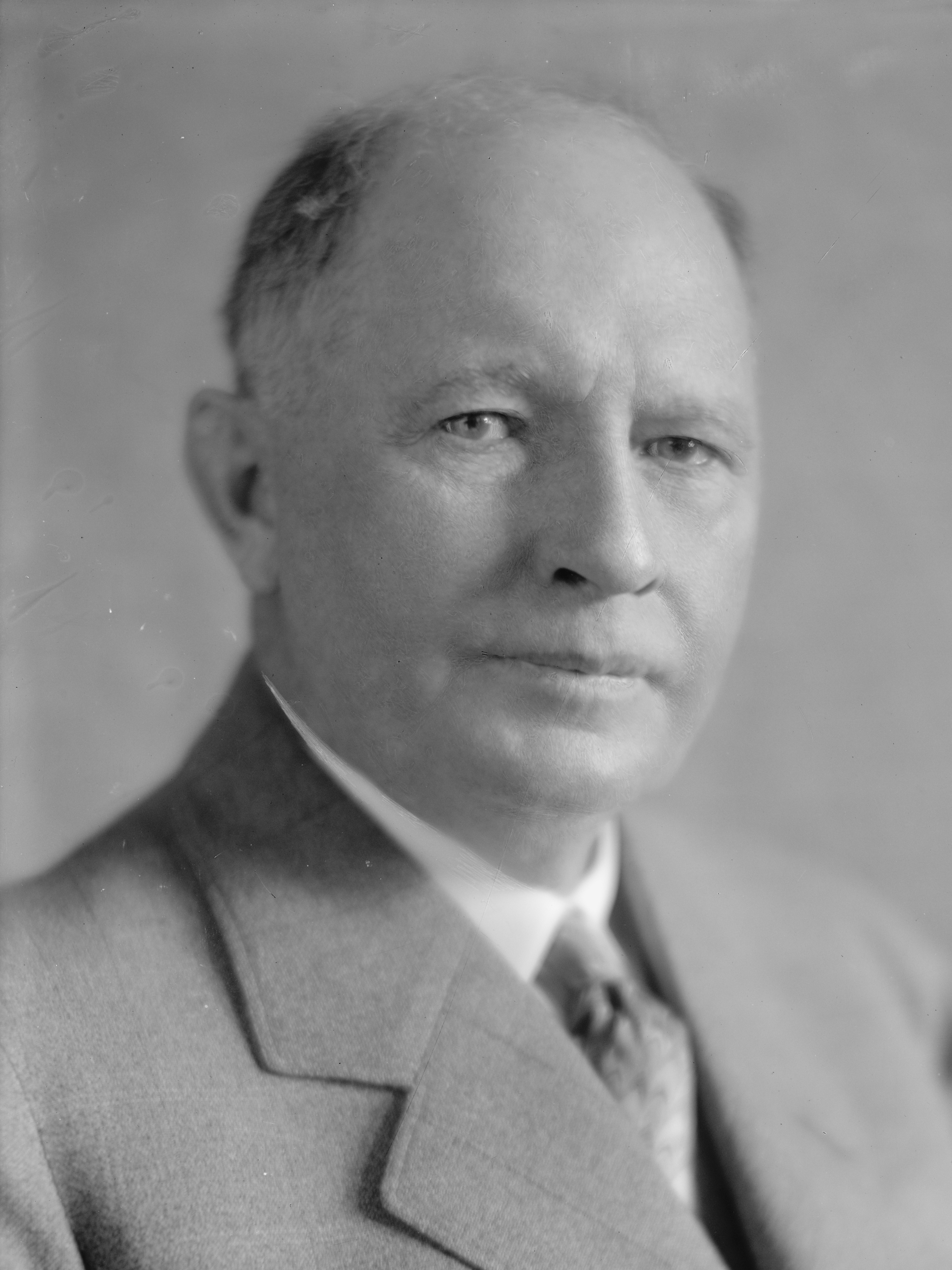

Member of the U.S. House of Representatives from Minnesota's 2nd district
- In office March 4, 1921 – March 3, 1933
- Preceded by: Franklin Ellsworth
- Succeeded by: General Ticket Adopted

27th Speaker of the Minnesota House of Representatives
- In office 1905-1907
- Preceded by: Leverett W. Babcock
- Succeeded by: Lawrence H. Johnson

Member of the Minnesota House of Representatives
- In office January 1, 1903 – January 1, 1907

Member of the Minnesota Senate
- In office January 1, 1907 – December 31, 1915

Personal details
- Born: July 13, 1865
- Died: March 25, 1952 (aged 86)
- Party: Republican
- Spouse: Stella Porter
- Occupation: Attorney

Frank Andrew Clague (July 13, 1865 – March 25, 1952) was a U.S. representative from Minnesota. He was born in Warrensville, Cuyahoga County, Ohio; attended the common schools; moved to Minnesota in 1881; attended the State normal school at Mankato 1882 – 1885; taught school at Springfield, Minnesota, 1886 – 1890; studied law; was admitted to the bar in 1891 and commenced practice in Lamberton, Redwood County, Minnesota, the same year; prosecuting attorney of Redwood County, Minnesota, 1895 – 1903; member of the Minnesota House of Representatives from January 1, 1903, to January 1, 1907, serving as speaker in the 1905 session; served in the Minnesota Senate from January 1, 1907, to December 31, 1915; judge of the ninth judicial district of Minnesota from January 1, 1919, to March 1, 1920, when he resigned; elected as a Republican to the 67th, 68th, 69th, 70th, 71st, and 72nd congresses, (March 4, 1921 – March 3, 1933); was not a candidate for renomination in 1932; resumed the practice of law and also engaged in agricultural pursuits until his retirement; died in Redwood Falls, Minnesota, March 25, 1952; interment in Redwood Falls Cemetery.

U.S. House of Representatives
Preceded by Franklin Ellsworth	U.S. Representative from Minnesota's 2nd congressional district 1921 – 1933	Succeeded by General Ticket Adopted
Political offices
Preceded by Leverett W. Babcock	Speaker of the Minnesota House of Representatives; 1905 – 1907	Succeeded by Lawrence H. Johnson
