= H. H. Flowers =

American politician

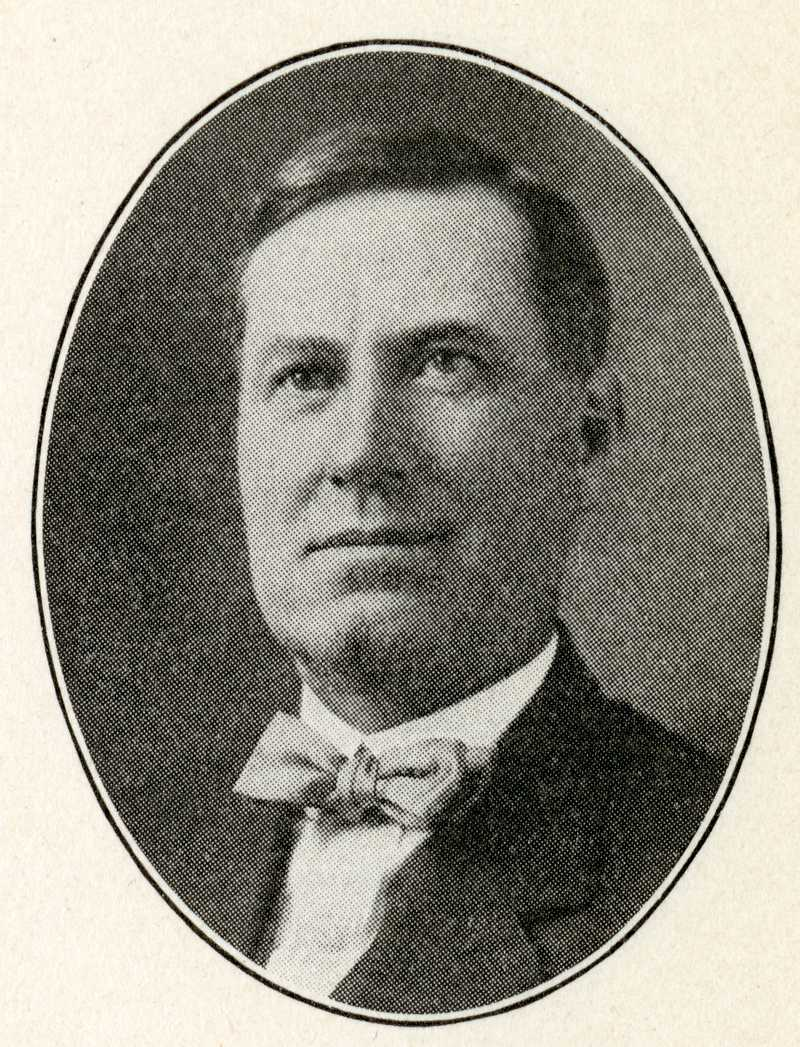

32nd Speaker of the Minnesota House of Representatives
- In office 1915–1917
- Preceded by: Henry Rines
- Succeeded by: Ralph J. Parker

Minnesota State Representative
- In office 1913–1919

Personal details
- Born: September 11, 1865 Cleveland, Minnesota, U.S.
- Died: May 8, 1945 (aged 79) Le Sueur County, Minnesota, U.S.
- Party: Republican
- Profession: Postmaster; Teacher; Banker

Harvey Howard Flowers (September 11, 1865 – May 8, 1945) was a Minnesota Republican politician and a Speaker of the Minnesota House of Representatives. Flowers served as postmaster for Cleveland, Minnesota and president of the Cleveland State Bank. He was elected to the Minnesota House of Representatives in 1912. He became speaker in 1915, a position he held two years.

Political offices
Preceded by Henry Rines	Speaker of the Minnesota House of Representatives; 1915–1917	Succeeded by Ralph J. Parker
