= Anton J. Rockne =

American politician (died 1950)

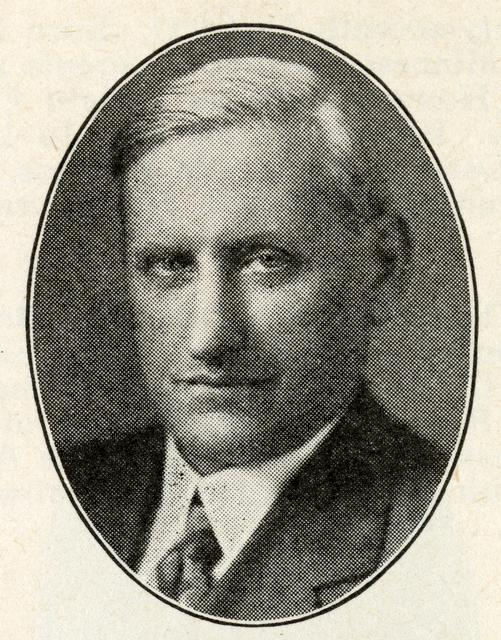
- Rockne in 1935

29th Speaker of the Minnesota House of Representatives
- In office 1909–1911
- Preceded by: Lawrence H. Johnson
- Succeeded by: Howard H. Dunn

Member of the Minnesota House of Representatives
- In office 1903–1911

Member of the Minnesota Senate
- In office 1911–1947

Minnesota House Majority Leader
- In office 1905–1909
- Preceded by: George W. Wilson
- Succeeded by: Henry Rines

Personal details
- Born: December 19, 1868(?) Harmony, Minnesota, U.S.
- Died: May 2, 1950 (aged 81)
- Party: Republican; Nonpartisan (Conservative Caucus)
- Spouse: Susie Albertson
- Children: Melroy, Elnor, Ariel
- Education: University of Minnesota
- Profession: Lawyer

Anton Julius "A.J." Rockne (December 19, 1868 or 1869 – May 2, 1950) was a Minnesota Republican politician, and the longest-serving state senator in the history of Minnesota.

== Background ==
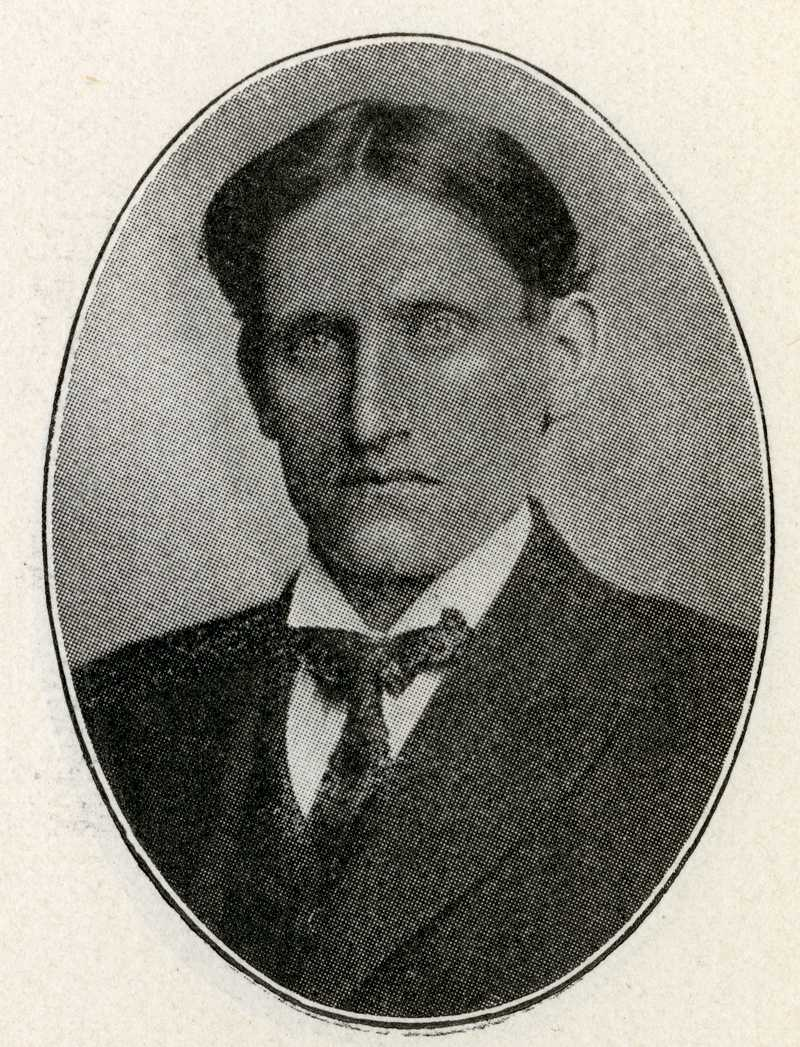
Rockne in 1913

Rockne was born in Harmony, Minnesota, to Norwegian immigrant parents. Rockne graduated from Decorah Institute, in Decorah, Iowa. Rockne completed a JD at University of Minnesota Law School in 1894. He was admitted to the Bar on June 7, 1894, and practiced as an attorney.

He was married to Susie Albertson on December 10, 1899, and had three children. Anton J. Rockne was a director and 1909 charter member of the Norwegian fraternal organization, Vosselag.

== Career ==
He was elected to the Minnesota House of Representatives in 1902 and elevated to Speaker of the Minnesota House of Representatives before election in 1910 to the Minnesota Senate, the latter position earning him the distinction during a 36 years tenure, the longest serving of any senator in state history. Rockne was chairman of the Senate Finance Committee from 1915 to 1947, with a conservative fiscal approach to state spending. As 'Watchdog of the Treasury', he was often in opposition to efforts of Governor Floyd B. Olson elected in 1931, to pass social programs, including during the Great Depression, the pair regularly traded insults and criticisms. Rockne would lose much of his control over the committee and the senate when an Olson-backed relief bill passed.

In the early 1930s, Rockne believed that state expenses could be cut by closing at least three public colleges, and that private colleges were able to replace them. This was met with opposition from public and private colleges, and the legislature defeated the plan.

His combined 44 years of state legislative service tied him with Carl M. Iverson for the longest tenure of legislative service in state until passed by Lyndon Carlson on January 3, 2017.

== Other sources ==
- Curtiss-Wedge, Franklyn History of Goodhue County, Minnesota (Chicago: H.C. Cooper Jr. & Co. 1910)

Political offices
Preceded by Lawrence H. Johnson	Speaker of the Minnesota House of Representatives; 1909–1911	Succeeded by Howard H. Dunn
Preceded by George W. Wilson	Minnesota House Majority Leader; 1905-1909	Succeeded by Henry Rines
