= Arthur N. Dare =

American politician

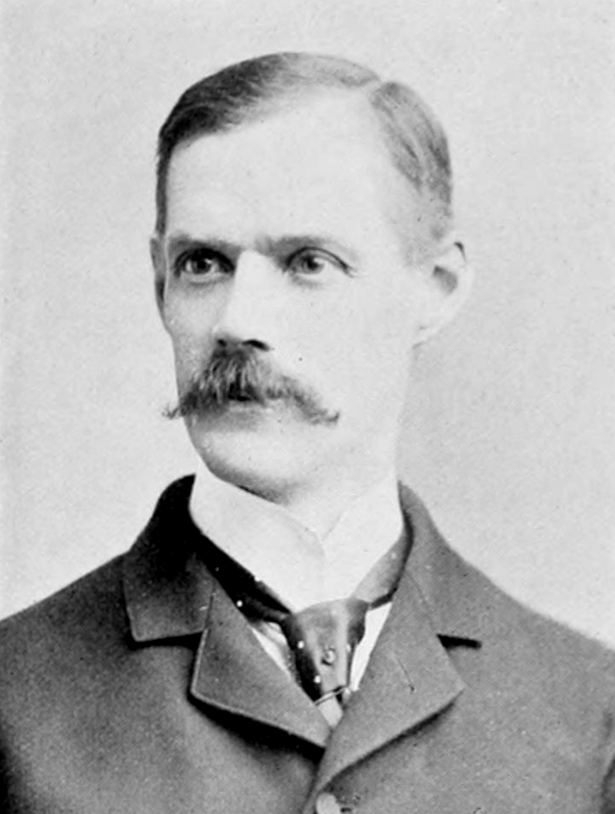

24th Speaker of the Minnesota House of Representatives
- In office 1899–1901
- Preceded by: John D. Jones
- Succeeded by: Michael J. Dowling

Minnesota State Representative
- In office 1895–1901

Personal details
- Born: May 25, 1850 Jordan, New York, U.S.
- Died: September 4, 1923 (aged 73) Elk River, Minnesota, U.S.
- Party: Republican
- Spouse: Susan "May" Albee
- Children: 3
- Profession: Newspaper publisher

Arthur Newman Dare (May 25, 1850 – September 4, 1923) was a Minnesota Republican politician and Speaker of the Minnesota House of Representatives. The publisher of the Star News in Elk River, Minnesota, Dare was first elected to the Minnesota House of Representatives in 1894. Dare served three terms, becoming speaker in 1899.

== Biography ==
Arthur N. Dare was born in Jordan, New York on Mary 25, 1850.

He died in Elk River on September 4, 1923.

Political offices
Preceded by John D. Jones	Speaker of the Minnesota House of Representatives; 1899–1901	Succeeded by Michael J. Dowling
