= 1926 Minnesota lieutenant gubernatorial election =

Minnesota lieutenant gubernatorial election, 1926
- November 2, 1926
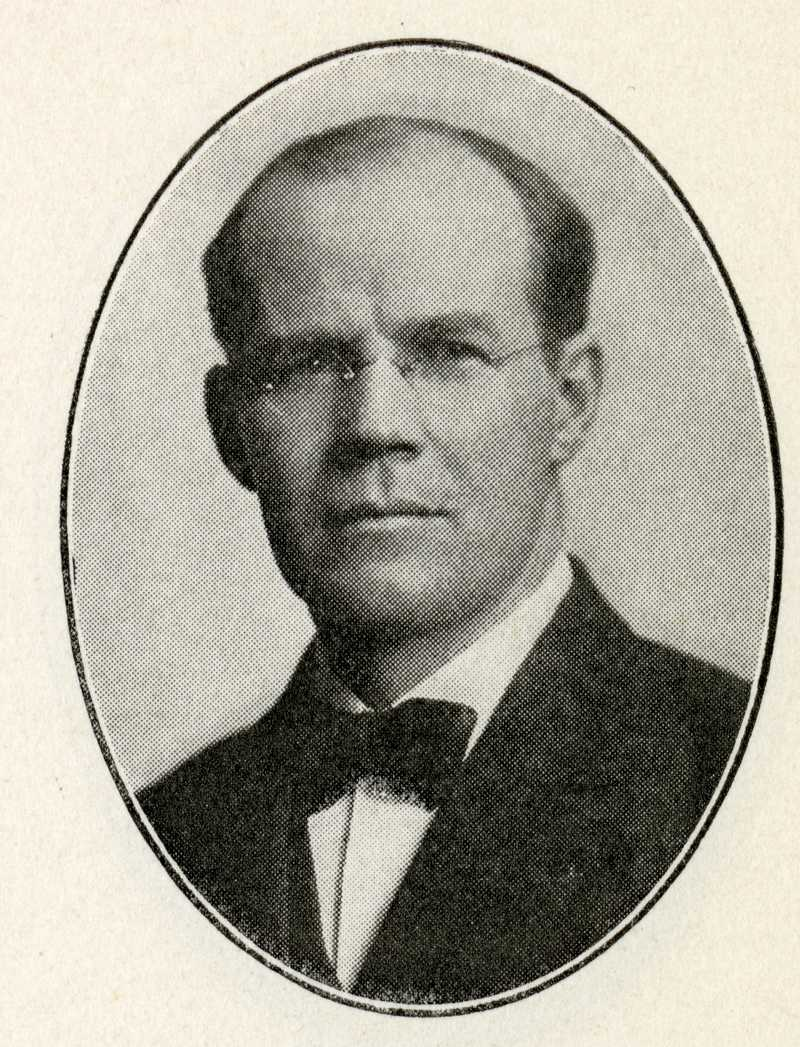

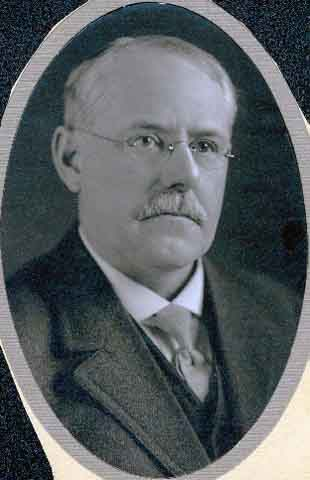
Nominee	William I. Nolan	Emil E. Holmes	Charles D. Johnson
Party	Republican	Farmer–Labor	Democratic
Popular vote	373,940	236,307	53,189
Percentage	56.36%	35.62%	8.02%
Lieutenant Governor before election
William I. Nolan
Republican
Elected Lieutenant Governor
William I. Nolan
Republican

The 1926 Minnesota lieutenant gubernatorial election took place on November 2, 1926. Incumbent Lieutenant Governor William I. Nolan of the Republican Party of Minnesota defeated Minnesota Farmer–Labor Party challenger Emil E. Holmes and Minnesota Democratic Party candidate Charles D. Johnson.

== Results ==
1926 lieutenant gubernatorial election, Minnesota
Party	Candidate	Votes	%	±%
Republican	William I. Nolan (incumbent)	373,940	56.36%	+5.49%
Farmer–Labor	Emil E. Holmes	236,307	35.62%	−7.27%
Democratic	Charles D. Johnson	53,189	8.02%	+1.77%
Majority		137,633	20.74%	
Turnout		663,436		
Republican hold		Swing		
