= List of speakers of the Minnesota House of Representatives =

Speaker of the Minnesota House of Representatives

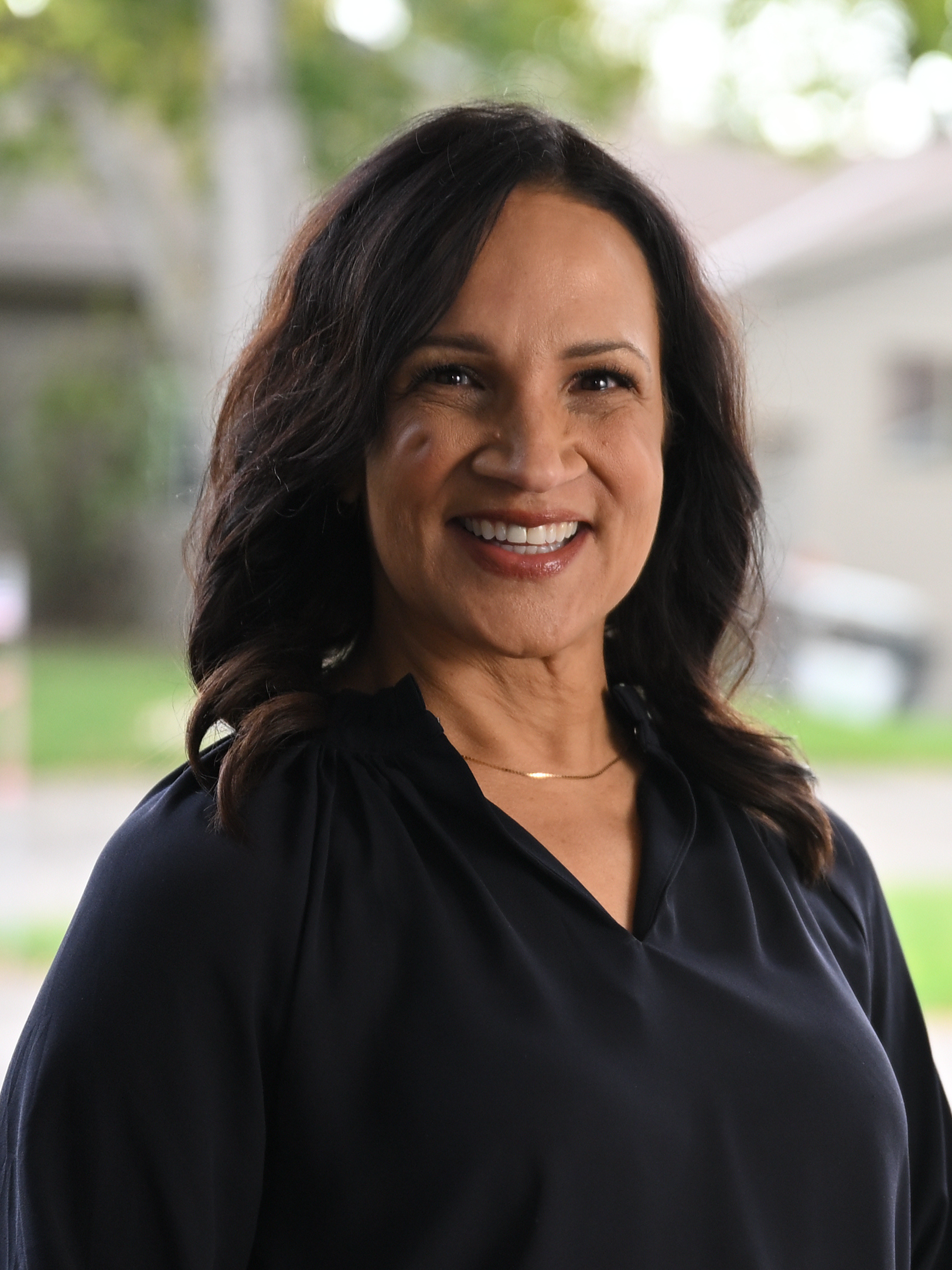
- Incumbent; Lisa Demuth since February 6, 2025
- Term length: Two years, no term limit
- Inaugural holder: John S. Watrous
- Formation: December 2, 1857
- Succession: Third
- Website: http://www.house.leg.state.mn.us/

This is a list of speakers of the Minnesota House of Representatives. The speaker of the House is usually the leader of the majority party, and is the most powerful figure in the House.

== Territorial ==
| # | Image | Speaker | Took office | Left office | Party/caucus |
|---|---|---|---|---|---|
| 1 | | Joseph W. Furber | 1849 | 1851 | Whig |
| 2 | | Michael E. Ames | 1851 | 1852 | Democratic |
| 3 | | John D. Ludden | 1852 | 1853 | Unknown |
| 4 | | David Day | 1853 | 1854 | Unknown |
| 5 | | Nathan C. D. Taylor | 1854 | 1855 | Unknown |
| 6 | | James S. Norris | 1855 | 1856 | Democratic |
| 7 | | Charles Gardner | 1856 | 1857 | Unknown |
| 8 | | Joseph W. Furber | 1857 | 1857 | Whig |

== State ==
| # | Image | Speaker | Took office | Left office | Party/caucus | Notes | Session |
|---|---|---|---|---|---|---|---|
| 1 | | John S. Watrous | 2 December 1857 | 12 March 1858 | Unknown | Further information: John S. Watrous Sources conflict on party | 1st |
| 2 | | George Bradley | 12 March 1858 | 6 December 1859 | Unknown | Further information: George Bradley (Minnesota politician) No sources proving or disproving any party affiliation | 1st |
| 3 | | Amos Coggswell | 7 December 1859 | 7 January 1861 | Republican | | 2nd |
| 4 | | Jared Benson | 8 January 1861 | 5 January 1863 | Republican | | 3rd |
| 4 | | Jared Benson | 8 January 1861 | 5 January 1863 | Republican | | 4th |
| 5 | | Charles D. Sherwood | 6 January 1863 | 4 January 1864 | Republican | | 5th |
| 6 | | Jared Benson | 5 January 1864 | 1864? | Republican | | 6th |
| 7 | | Thomas H. Armstrong | 1864? | 1865 | Republican | Unclear whether he took office in 1864 or 1865 | 7th |
| 8 | | James B. Wakefield | 1866 | 1866 | Republican | Served as a U.S. representative | 8th |
| 9 | | John Q. Farmer | 1867 | 1868 | Whig/Republican | | 9th |
| 9 | | John Q. Farmer | 1867 | 1868 | Whig/Republican | | 10th |
| 10 | | Chester D. Davidson | 1869 | 1869 | Republican | | 11th |
| 11 | | John L. Merriam | 1870 | 1871 | Republican | | 12th |
| 11 | | John L. Merriam | 1870 | 1871 | Republican | | 13th |
| 12 | | A.R. Hall | 1872 | 1874 | Republican | | 14th |
| 12 | | A.R. Hall | 1872 | 1874 | Republican | | 15th |
| 12 | | A.R. Hall | 1872 | 1874 | Republican | | 16th |
| 13 | | William R. Kinyon | 1875 | 1876 | Republican | | 17th |
| 13 | | William R. Kinyon | 1875 | 1876 | Republican | | 18th |
| 14 | | John L. Gibbs | 1877 | 1877 | Republican | | 19th |
| 15 | | Charles A. Gilman | 1878 | 1879 | Republican | | 20th |
| 15 | | Charles A. Gilman | 1878 | 1879 | Republican | | 21st |
| 16 | | Loren Fletcher | 1881 | 1885 | Republican | | 22nd |
| 16 | | Loren Fletcher | 1881 | 1885 | Republican | | 23rd |
| 17 | | John L. Gibbs | 1885 | 1887 | Republican | | 24th |
| 18 | | William Rush Merriam | 1887 | 1889 | Republican | Served as Governor of Minnesota | 25th |
| 19 | | Charles H. Graves | 1889 | 1891 | Republican | | 26th |
| 20 | | Ezra T. Champlin | 1891 | 1893 | Alliance | | 27th |
| 21 | | William E. Lee | 1893 | 1895 | Republican | | 28th |
| 22 | | Samuel Rinnah Van Sant | 1895 | 1897 | Republican | Served as Governor of Minnesota | 29th |
| 23 | | John D. Jones | 1897 | 1899 | Republican | | 30th |
| 24 | | Arthur N. Dare | 1899 | 1901 | Republican | | 31st |
| 25 | | M.J. Dowling | 1901 | 1903 | Republican | | 32nd |
| 26 | | Leverett W. Babcock | 1903 | 1905 | Republican | | 33rd |
| 27 | | Frank Clague | 1905 | 1907 | Republican | Served as a U.S. representative | 34th |
| 28 | | Lawrence H. Johnson | 1907 | 1909 | Republican | | 35th |
| 29 | | Anton J. Rockne | 1909 | 1911 | Republican | | 36th |
| 30 | | Howard H. Dunn | 1911 | 1913 | Republican | | 37th |
| 31 | | Henry Rines | 1913 | 1915 | Conservative | Served as Minnesota Treasurer | 38th |
| 32 | | H. H. Flowers | 1915 | 1917 | Conservative | | 39th |
| 33 | | Ralph J. Parker | January 1917 | January 1919 | Conservative | | 40th |
| 34 | | William I. Nolan | January 1919 | January 1925 | Conservative | | 41st |
| 34 | | William I. Nolan | January 1919 | January 1925 | Conservative | | 42nd |
| 34 | | William I. Nolan | January 1919 | January 1925 | Conservative | | 43rd |
| 35 | | John A. Johnson | January 1925 | January 1931 | Conservative | | 44th |
| 35 | | John A. Johnson | January 1925 | January 1931 | Conservative | | 45th |
| 35 | | John A. Johnson | January 1925 | January 1931 | Conservative | | 46th |
| 36 | | Oscar A. Swenson | January 1931 | January 1933 | Conservative | | 47th |
| 37 | | Charles Munn | January 1933 | January 1935 | Liberal | | 48th |
| 38 | | George W. Johnson | January 1935 | January 1937 | Conservative | | 49th |
| 39 | | Harold H. Barker | January 1937 | January 1939 | Liberal | | 50th |
| 40 | | Lawrence M. Hall | January 1939 | January 1949 | Conservative | Longest-serving speaker | 51st |
| 40 | | Lawrence M. Hall | January 1939 | January 1949 | Conservative | Longest-serving speaker | 52nd |
| 40 | | Lawrence M. Hall | January 1939 | January 1949 | Conservative | Longest-serving speaker | 53rd |
| 40 | | Lawrence M. Hall | January 1939 | January 1949 | Conservative | Longest-serving speaker | 54th |
| 40 | | Lawrence M. Hall | January 1939 | January 1949 | Conservative | Longest-serving speaker | 55th |
| 41 | | John A. Hartle | January 4, 1949 | January 6, 1955 | Conservative | | 56th |
| 41 | | John A. Hartle | January 4, 1949 | January 6, 1955 | Conservative | | 57th |
| 41 | | John A. Hartle | January 4, 1949 | January 6, 1955 | Conservative | | 58th |
| 42 | | Alfred I. Johnson | January 6, 1955 | January 5, 1959 | Liberal | | 59th |
| 42 | | Alfred I. Johnson | January 6, 1955 | January 5, 1959 | Liberal | | 60th |
| 43 | | Edwin J. Chilgren | January 5, 1959 | January 7, 1963 | Liberal | | 61st |
| 43 | | Edwin J. Chilgren | January 5, 1959 | January 7, 1963 | Liberal | | 62nd |
| 44 | | Lloyd L. Duxbury | January 7, 1963 | January 1971 | Conservative | | 63rd |
| 44 | | Lloyd L. Duxbury | January 7, 1963 | January 1971 | Conservative | | 64th |
| 44 | | Lloyd L. Duxbury | January 7, 1963 | January 1971 | Conservative | | 65th |
| 44 | | Lloyd L. Duxbury | January 7, 1963 | January 1971 | Conservative | | 66th |
| 45 | | A.W. Dirlam | January 1971 | January 1973 | Conservative | | 67th |
| 46 | | Martin Olav Sabo | January 1973 | January 1979 | DFL | Served as a U.S. representative | 68th |
| 46 | | Martin Olav Sabo | January 1973 | January 1979 | DFL | Served as a U.S. representative | 69th |
| 46 | | Martin Olav Sabo | January 1973 | January 1979 | DFL | Served as a U.S. representative | 70th |
| 47 | | Rod Searle | January 1979 | January 1980 | Independent-Republican | | 71st |
| 48 | | Fred C. Norton | January 1980 | January 1981 | DFL | Served on Minnesota Court of Appeals | 71st |
| 49 | | Harry A. Sieben | January 1981 | January 1985 | DFL | | 72nd |
| 49 | | Harry A. Sieben | January 1981 | January 1985 | DFL | | 73rd |
| 50 | | David M. Jennings | January 1985 | January 1987 | Independent-Republican | | 74th |
| 51 | | Fred C. Norton | January 1987 | June 1987 | DFL | Served on Minnesota Court of Appeals | 75th |
| 52 | | Robert Vanasek | June 1987 | January 6, 1992 | DFL | | 75th |
| 52 | | Robert Vanasek | June 1987 | January 6, 1992 | DFL | | 76th |
| 52 | | Robert Vanasek | June 1987 | January 6, 1992 | DFL | | 77th |
| 53 | | Dee Long | January 6, 1992 | September 15, 1993 | DFL | First woman to serve as speaker | 77th |
| 53 | | Dee Long | January 6, 1992 | September 15, 1993 | DFL | First woman to serve as speaker | 78th |
| 54 | | Irv Anderson | September 1993 | January 1997 | DFL | | 78th |
| 54 | | Irv Anderson | September 1993 | January 1997 | DFL | | 79th |
| 55 | | Phil Carruthers | January 1997 | January 1999 | DFL | | 80th |
| 56 | | Steve Sviggum | January 1999 | January 2007 | Republican | | 81st |
| 56 | | Steve Sviggum | January 1999 | January 2007 | Republican | | 82nd |
| 56 | | Steve Sviggum | January 1999 | January 2007 | Republican | | 83rd |
| 56 | | Steve Sviggum | January 1999 | January 2007 | Republican | | 84th |
| 57 | | Margaret Anderson Kelliher | January 2007 | January 2011 | DFL | | 85th |
| 57 | | Margaret Anderson Kelliher | January 2007 | January 2011 | DFL | | 86th |
| 58 | | Kurt Zellers | January 4, 2011 | January 8, 2013 | Republican | | 87th |
| 59 | | Paul Thissen | January 8, 2013 | January 6, 2015 | DFL | Appointed to the Minnesota Supreme Court in 2018 | 88th |
| 60 | | Kurt Daudt | January 6, 2015 | January 8, 2019 | Republican | | 89th |
| 60 | | Kurt Daudt | January 6, 2015 | January 8, 2019 | Republican | | 90th |
| 61 | | Melissa Hortman | January 8, 2019 | January 14, 2025 | DFL | | 91st |
| 61 | | Melissa Hortman | January 8, 2019 | January 14, 2025 | DFL | | 92nd |
| 61 | | Melissa Hortman | January 8, 2019 | January 14, 2025 | DFL | | 93rd |
| — | — | — | January 14, 2025 | February 6, 2025 | Vacant | Lisa Demuth (Republican) was purportedly elected on the aforementioned date; the Minnesota Supreme Court invalidated her election, finding that the House did not have a quorum to transact the business of electing her | 94th |
| 62 | | Lisa Demuth | February 6, 2025 | Incumbent | Republican | First African-American speaker, first biracial speaker, first female Republican Speaker. | 94th |
Source: Minnesota Legislative Reference Library

=== Notes on Minnesota political party names ===
- Minnesota Democratic–Farmer–Labor Party: On April 15, 1944, the state Democratic Party and the Minnesota Farmer-Labor Party merged and created the Minnesota Democratic–Farmer–Labor Party (DFL). It is affiliated with the national Democratic Party.
- Republican Party of Minnesota: From November 15, 1975, to September 23, 1995, the name of the state Republican party was the Independent-Republican party (I-R). The party has always been affiliated with the national Republican Party.

In 1913, Minnesota legislators began to be elected on nonpartisan ballots. Nonpartisanship also was an historical accident that occurred in the 1913 session when a bill to provide for no party elections of judges and city and county officers was amended to include the Legislature in the belief that it would kill the bill. Legislators ran and caucused as "Liberals" or "Conservatives" roughly equivalent in most years to Democratic-Farmer-Labor and Republican, respectively. The law was changed in 1973, in 1974, House members again ran with party designation.

=== Speaker Emeritus ===
Under House rules, former speakers who are serving in the House are given the title of Speaker Emeritus. While the position has no formal power, the title is seen as a sign of respect for former speakers.

== See also ==
- List of Minnesota state legislatures
