= Henry Rines =

American politician (1872–1950)

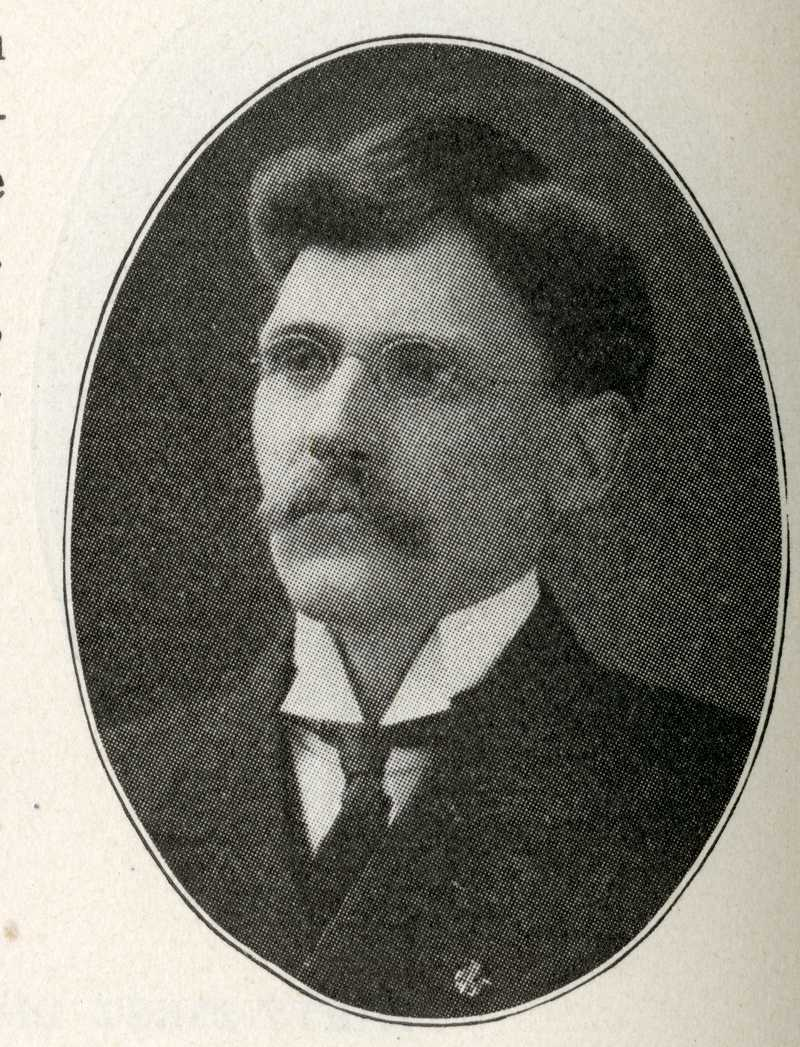

15th Minnesota State Treasurer
- In office 1917–1925
- Governor: J. A. A. Burnquist; J. A. O. Preus
- Preceded by: Arthur C. Gooding
- Succeeded by: Edward W. Stark

31st Speaker of the Minnesota House of Representatives
- In office 1913–1915
- Preceded by: Howard H. Dunn
- Succeeded by: H.H. Flowers

Minnesota House Majority Leader
- In office 1909–1913
- Preceded by: Anton J. Rockne
- Succeeded by: William I. Nolan

Personal details
- Born: June 9, 1872 Orsa, Sweden
- Died: October 5, 1950 (aged 78) Mora, Minnesota, U.S.
- Party: Republican
- Profession: Publisher

Henry Rines (June 9, 1872 – October 5, 1950) was a Minnesota Republican politician, Minnesota State Treasurer, and Speaker of the Minnesota House of Representatives. Rines, a newspaper publisher, emigrated as a child from Orsa, Sweden. He was elected to the Minnesota House of Representatives in 1906. He served as speaker from 1913 to 1915, as a part of a faction of progressive Republicans. He was elected as State Treasurer in 1916, a position he held for two terms.

After leaving office, Rines served in a variety of capacities, working as the chair of the state commission of administration and finance, and serving on the state office building committee. He was elected again to the House in 1942, and served two terms. He died in 1950.

Party political offices
Preceded by Walter J. Smith	Republican nominee for Minnesota State Treasurer; 1916, 1918, 1920, 1922, 1924	Succeeded by Julius A. Schmahl
Political offices
Preceded by Arthur C. Gooding	Minnesota State Treasurer; 1917 – 1925	Succeeded by Edward W. Stark
Preceded by Howard H. Dunn	Speaker of the Minnesota House of Representatives; 1913 – 1915	Succeeded by H.H. Flowers
Preceded by Anton J. Rockne	Minnesota House Majority Leader; 1909-1913	Succeeded by William I. Nolan
