= 1922 Minnesota lieutenant gubernatorial election =

Minnesota lieutenant gubernatorial election, 1922
- November 7, 1922
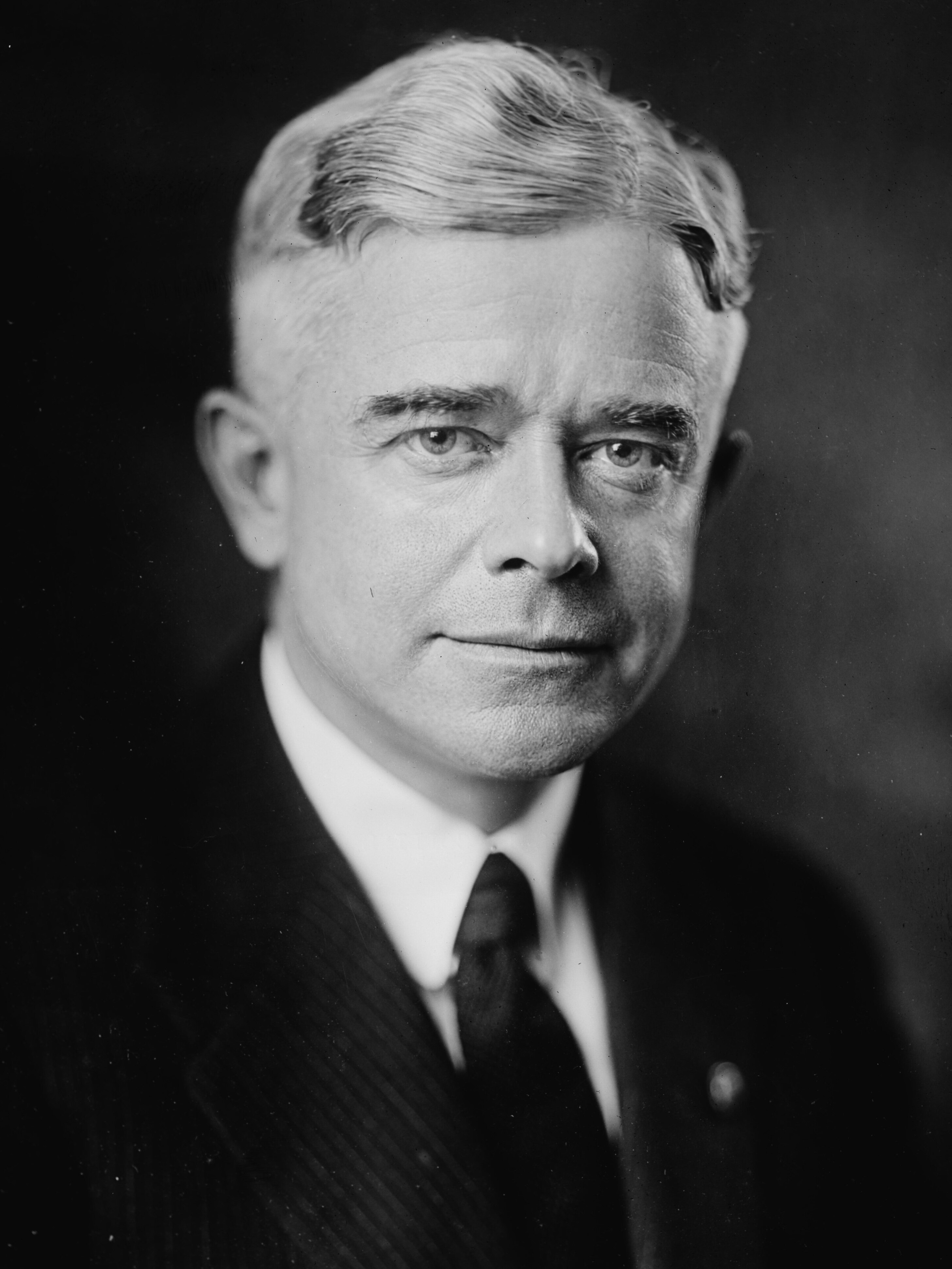

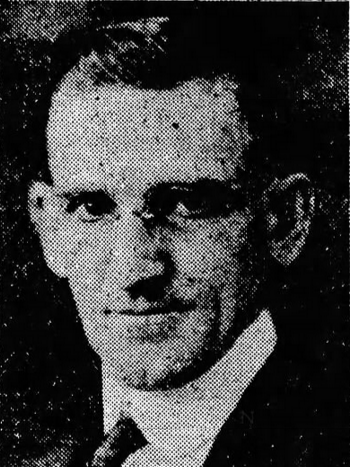

Nominee	Louis L. Collins	Arthur A. Siegler	Silas M. Bryan
Party	Republican	Farmer–Labor	Democratic
Popular vote	325,320	272,669	68,934
Percentage	48.78%	40.88%	10.34%
Lieutenant Governor before election
Louis L. Collins
Republican
Elected Lieutenant Governor
Louis L. Collins
Republican

The 1922 Minnesota lieutenant gubernatorial election took place on November 7, 1922. Incumbent Lieutenant Governor Louis L. Collins of the Republican Party of Minnesota defeated Minnesota Farmer–Labor Party challenger Arthur A. Siegler and Minnesota Democratic Party candidate Silas M. Bryan.

== Results ==
1922 lieutenant gubernatorial election, Minnesota
Party	Candidate	Votes	%	±%
Republican	Louis L. Collins (incumbent)	325,320	48.78%	−8.58%
Farmer–Labor	Arthur A. Siegler	272,669	40.88%	+11.07%
Democratic	Silas M. Bryan	68,934	10.34%	−0.20%
Majority		52,651	7.90%	
Turnout		666,923		
Republican hold		Swing		
