= Howard H. Dunn =

American politician

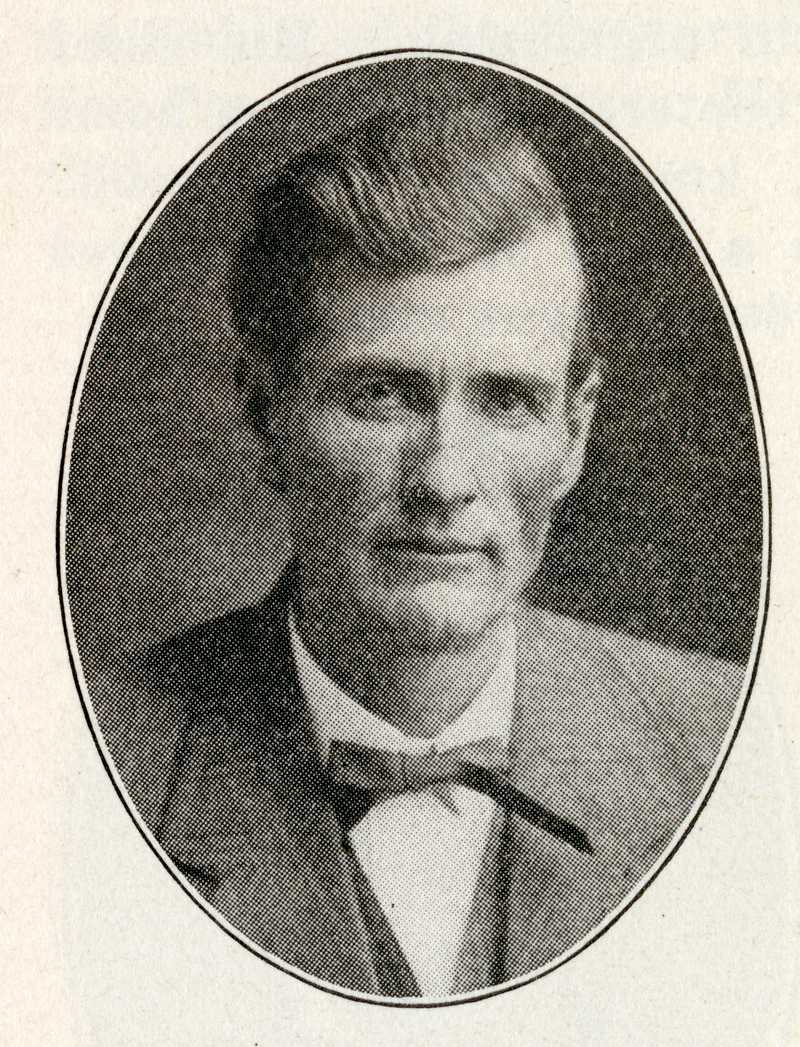

30th Speaker of the Minnesota House of Representatives
- In office 1911–1913
- Preceded by: Anton J. Rockne
- Succeeded by: Henry Rines

Minnesota State Representative
- In office 1911–1915

Minnesota State Senator
- In office 1897–1899

Personal details
- Born: October 29, 1867 Jackson, Minnesota, U.S.
- Died: May 7, 1942 (aged 74) San Antonio, Texas, U.S.
- Party: Republican
- Profession: Lawyer

Howard Harrison Dunn (1867–1942) was a Minnesota Republican politician and a Speaker of the Minnesota House of Representatives.

== Biography ==
Howard H. Dunn was born in Jackson, Minnesota on October 29, 1867.

Dunn was city attorney for Fairmont, Minnesota, and was elected to the Minnesota Senate in 1896. He served only one term in the Senate, but was elected to the Minnesota House of Representatives in 1910, where he was immediately selected as speaker, a position he held until 1913. Dunn died in San Antonio, Texas on May 7, 1942.

Political offices
Preceded by Anton J. Rockne	Speaker of the Minnesota House of Representatives; 1911–1913	Succeeded by Henry Rines
