= Louis L. Collins =

American politician (1882–1950)

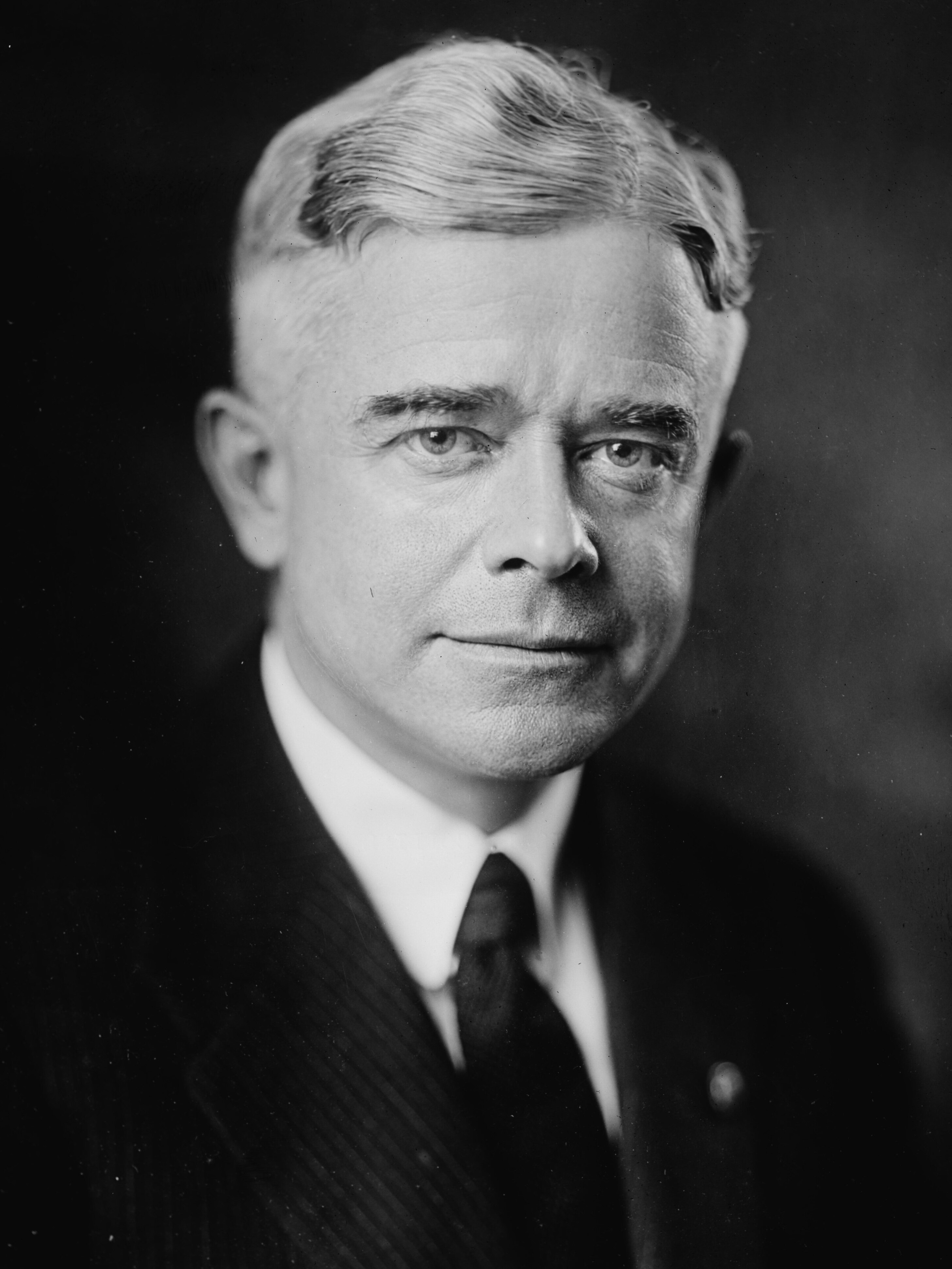

23rd Lieutenant Governor of Minnesota
- In office January 4, 1921 – January 6, 1925
- Governor: J. A. O. Preus
- Preceded by: Thomas Frankson
- Succeeded by: William I. Nolan

Personal details
- Born: October 6, 1882 St. Cloud, Minnesota, U.S.
- Died: June 24, 1950 (aged 67) St. Cloud, Minnesota, U.S.
- Party: Republican
- Profession: lawyer, newspaperman

Louis Loren Collins (October 6, 1882 – June 24, 1950) was an attorney, newspaperman, and Republican politician from Minnesota. He was the 23rd Lieutenant Governor of Minnesota.

== Early life ==
He was born in St. Cloud, Minnesota, and was the son of Minnesota Supreme Court Associate Justice Loren W. Collins.

Prior to becoming an attorney, Collins worked in journalism and was city editor of the Minneapolis Journal. During World War I, he served as a volunteer ambulance driver for the French Army prior to the US entrance into the war. When the US entered the war, he joined the US Army and served as a corporal in the artillery.

== Political career ==
He was elected Lieutenant Governor in 1920 as running mate of Governor J. A. O. Preus. He and Preus were re-elected in 1922. In both elections, Collins received more votes than Preus. They both served from January 4, 1921 to January 6, 1925.

== Death ==
He died in 1950 in St. Cloud.

Party political offices
| Preceded by Thomas Frankson | Republican nominee for Lieutenant Governor of Minnesota; 1920, 1922 | Succeeded by William I. Nolan |
Political offices
| Preceded by Thomas Frankson | Lieutenant Governor of Minnesota; 1921–1925 | Succeeded by William I. Nolan |
