= Charles Edward Adams (politician) =

American lawyer and politician (1867–1936)

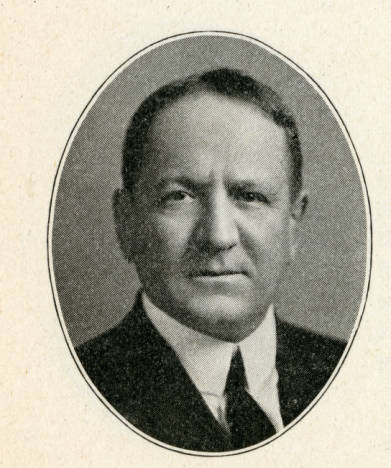
- Portrait of Charles Edward Adams in 1915

Member of the Minnesota Senate from the 57th district
- In office January 1, 1915 – October 6, 1936

25th Lieutenant Governor of Minnesota
- In office June 25, 1929 – January 6, 1931
- Governor: Theodore Christianson
- Preceded by: William I. Nolan
- Succeeded by: Henry M. Arens

Personal details
- Born: October 1, 1867 Boston, Massachusetts, U.S.
- Died: October 6, 1936 (aged 69) Duluth, Minnesota, U.S.
- Resting place: Lakewood Cemetery; Minneapolis, Minnesota, U.S.
- Party: Republican
- Spouse: Grace Mabel Tennant (m. 1902)
- Children: 3
- Education: University of Minnesota (BA, LLB)

Charles Edward Adams (October 1, 1867 – October 6, 1936) was an American lawyer and Republican politician who was a member of the Minnesota Senate and the 25th lieutenant governor of Minnesota.

== Life and career ==
Adams was born in Boston, Massachusetts in 1867. His family moved to New York in 1882, then later to the Dakota Territory. Adams attended high school and his first year of college in Fargo, North Dakota before transferring to Princeton University in 1892. After a year he transferred to the University of Minnesota where he completed his degree, graduating in 1896. While there Adams played on the Minnesota Golden Gophers football team from 1893 to 1895 as quarterback and halfback. He later earned a law degree from the University of Minnesota Law School in 1900.

== Career ==
After a brief period as superintendent of the Granite Falls, Minnesota schools.

Adams settled in Duluth, Minnesota and started a law practice. In 1911, he was named special counsel for St. Louis County, Minnesota. In 1914 he was elected to his first term in the Minnesota Senate, a position he would hold for the next 22 years. While a senator he was an advocate for the Babcock Amendment which established the Minnesota trunk highways as well as causes related to transportation, taxation and education. He became president pro tempore of the Minnesota Senate in 1929 which meant that he became acting lieutenant governor after William Ignatius Nolan was elected to the U.S. House of Representatives.

== Personal life ==
In 1902, he married Grace Mabel Tennant of Minneapolis. They had a son and two daughters, John, Elizabeth and Mary. Adams died while in office on October 6, 1936. He is buried in Lakewood Cemetery in Minneapolis, Minnesota.

Political offices
Preceded by William I. Nolan	Lieutenant Governor of Minnesota; 1929 – 1931	Succeeded by Henry M. Arens
