= George H. Mallon =

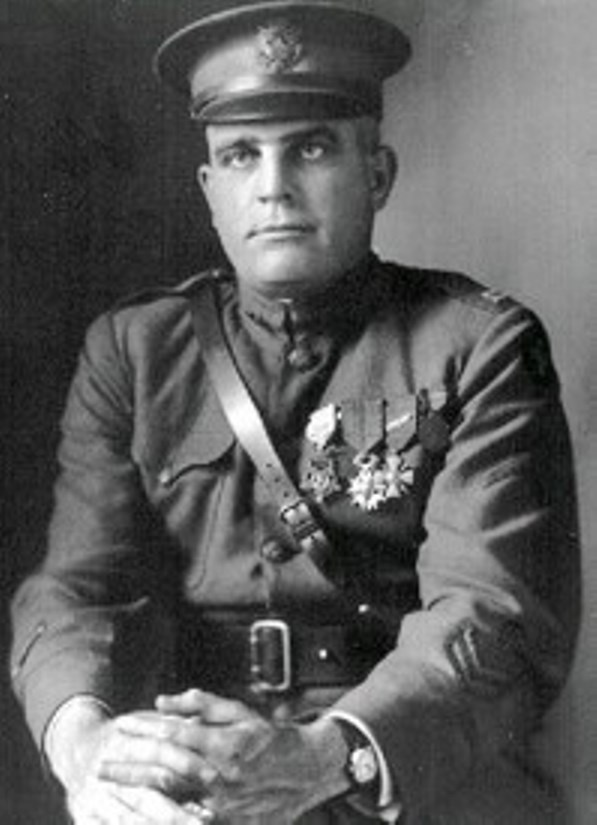
- Medal of Honor recipient
- Born: June 15, 1877; Ogden, Kansas, US
- Died: August 2, 1934 (aged 57); St. Cloud, Minnesota, US
- Burial place: Fort Snelling National Cemetery, Minneapolis, Minnesota
- Military career
- Allegiance: United States
- Branch: United States Army
- Service years: 1917–1919
- Rank: Captain
- Units: 132nd Infantry Regiment, 33rd Infantry Division
- Conflicts: World War I
- Awards: Medal of Honor; Purple Heart

George H. Mallon (June 15, 1877 – August 2, 1934) was an officer in the United States Army who received the Medal of Honor for his actions during World War I.

== Biography ==
Mallon was born in Ogden, Kansas on June 15, 1877. He was commissioned as a captain in August 1917, and honorably discharged in June 1919. Mallon died August 2, 1934, and is buried at Fort Snelling National Cemetery in Minneapolis, Minnesota.

== Awards ==
- Medal of Honor
- Purple Heart
- Philippine Campaign Medal
- World War I
- Army of Occupation of Germany Medal
- Legion of Honor (France)
- Croix de Guerre with palm (France)

=== Medal of Honor citation ===
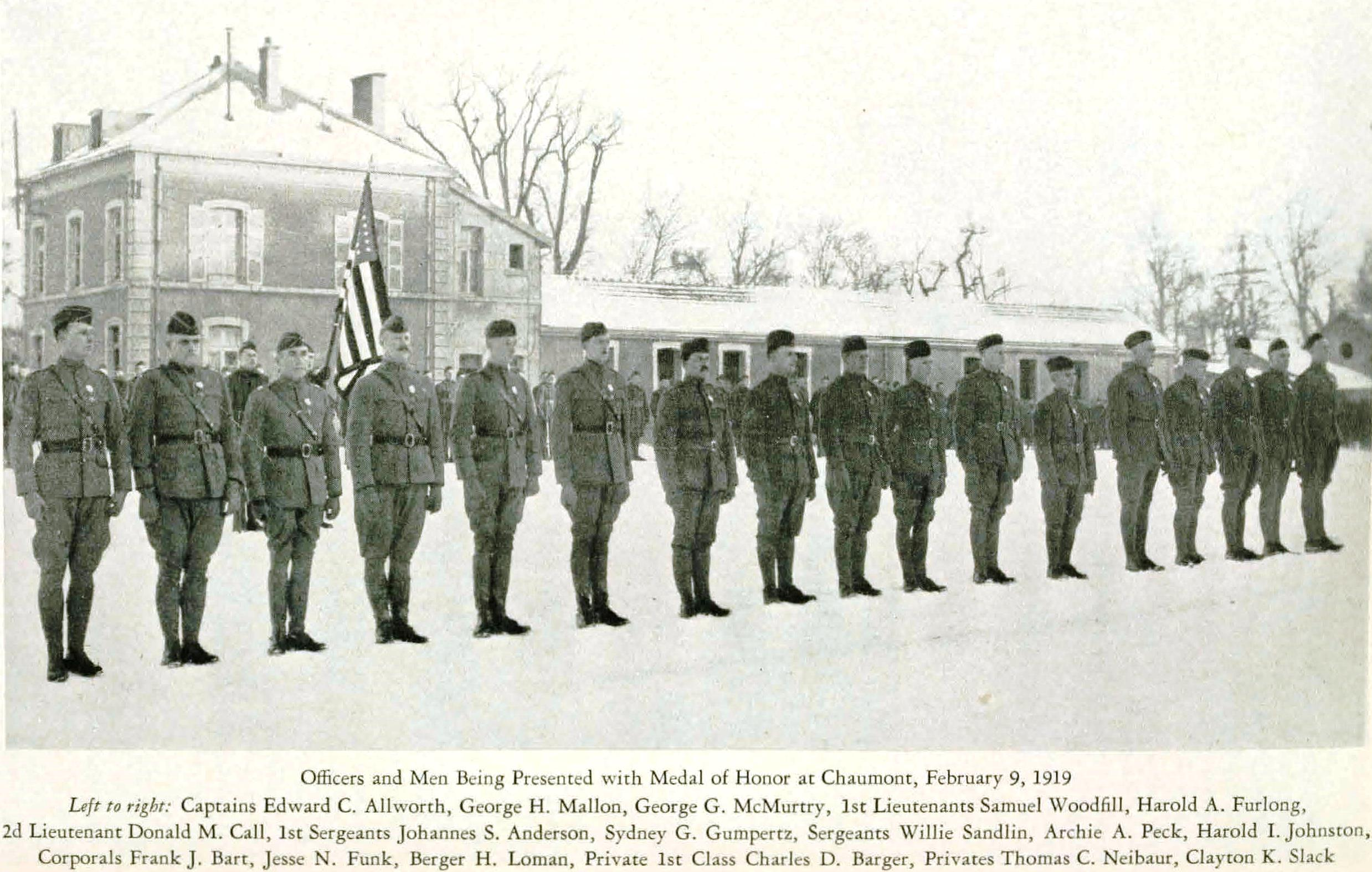
Medal of Honor Presentation Ceremony - February 9, 1919, at Chaumont, France. General John J. Pershing presided.

Rank and organization: Captain, U.S. Army, 132d Infantry, 33d Division. Place and date: In the Bois-de-Forges, France, 26 September 1918. Entered service at: Minneapolis, Minn. Born: 15 June 1877 Ogden, Kans. G.O. No.: 16, W.D., 1919.

Citation:

Becoming separated from the balance of his company because of a fog, Capt. Mallon, with 9 soldiers, pushed forward and attacked 9 active hostile machineguns, capturing all of them without the loss of a man. Continuing on through the woods, he led his men in attacking a battery of four 155-millimeter howitzers, which were in action, rushing the position and capturing the battery and its crew. In this encounter Capt. Mallon personally attacked 1 of the enemy with his fists. Later, when the party came upon 2 more machineguns, this officer sent men to the flanks while he rushed forward directly in the face of the fire and silenced the guns, being the first one of the party to reach the nest. The exceptional gallantry and determination displayed by Capt. Mallon resulted in the capture of 100 prisoners, 11 machineguns, four 155-millimeter howitzers and 1 antiaircraft gun.

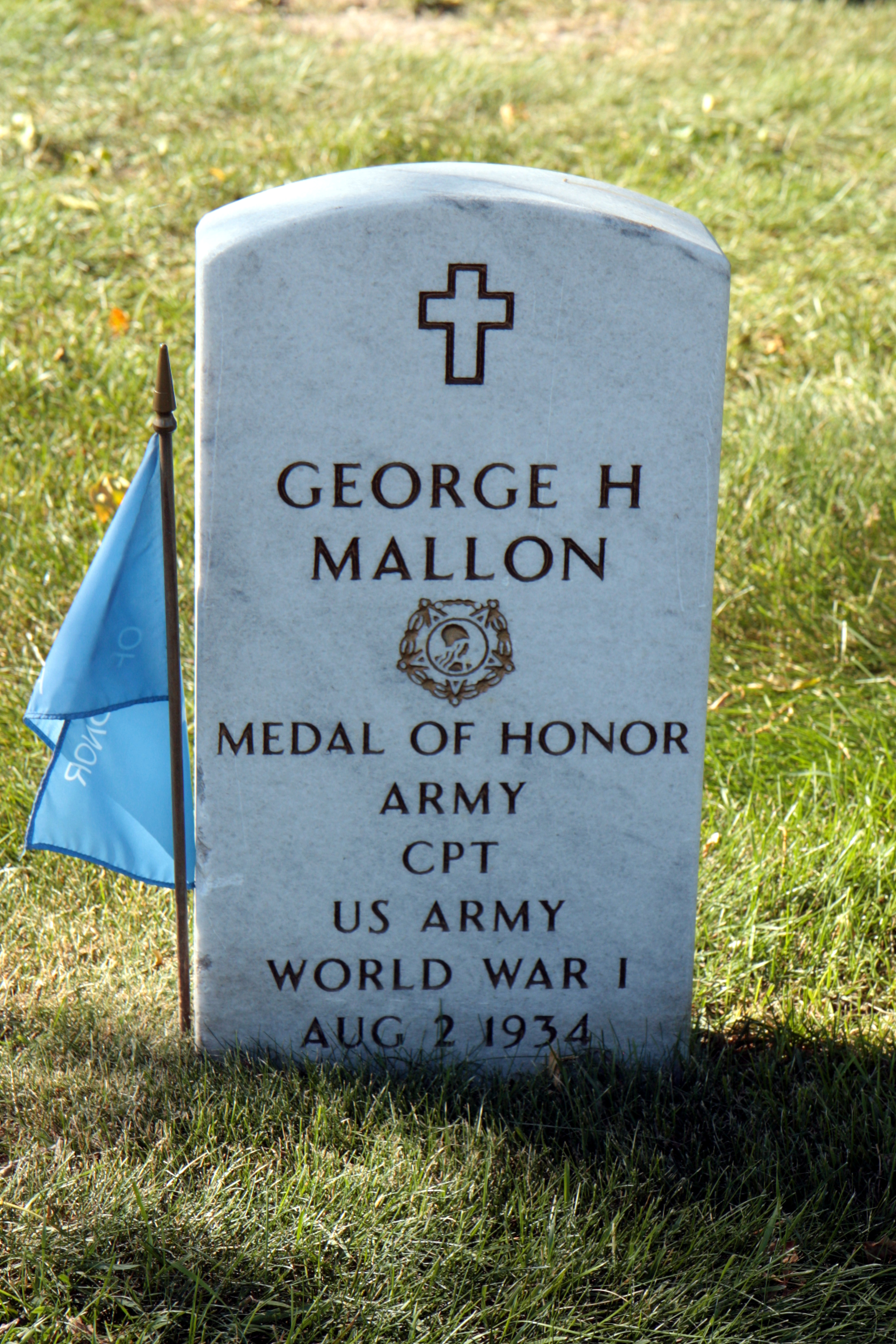
George H Mallon headstone in Fort Snelling National Cemetery

== See also ==
- List of Medal of Honor recipients
- List of Medal of Honor recipients for World War I
