= Lawrence H. Johnson =

American politician

Lawrence Henry Johnson
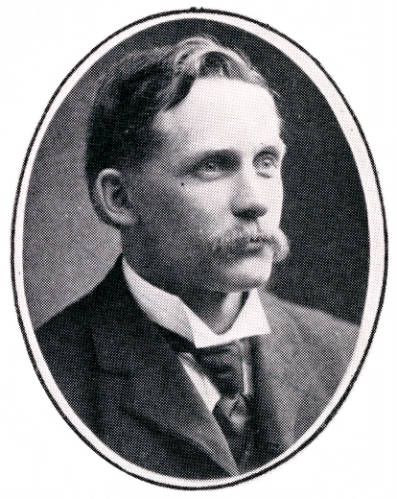
- Lawrence Henry Johnson, 1907

28th Speaker of the Minnesota House of Representatives
- In office 1907–1909
- Preceded by: Frank Clague
- Succeeded by: Anton J. Rockne

Minnesota State Representative
- In office 1901–1911

Personal details
- Born: 1862 Germany
- Died: 1947 (aged 84–85)
- Party: Republican
- Profession: Engineer

Lawrence Henry Johnson (1861 in Germany – 1947) was a Minnesota Republican politician and a Speaker of the Minnesota House of Representatives. Johnson, a bridge contractor and engineer, came to Minnesota in 1884, and was elected to the Minnesota House of Representatives in 1900. He served five terms, serving as speaker from 1907 to 1909. Johnson died in 1947.

Political offices
Preceded by Frank Clague	Speaker of the Minnesota House of Representatives; 1907–1909	Succeeded by Anton J. Rockne
