= 1877 Minnesota Attorney General election =

- November 6, 1877
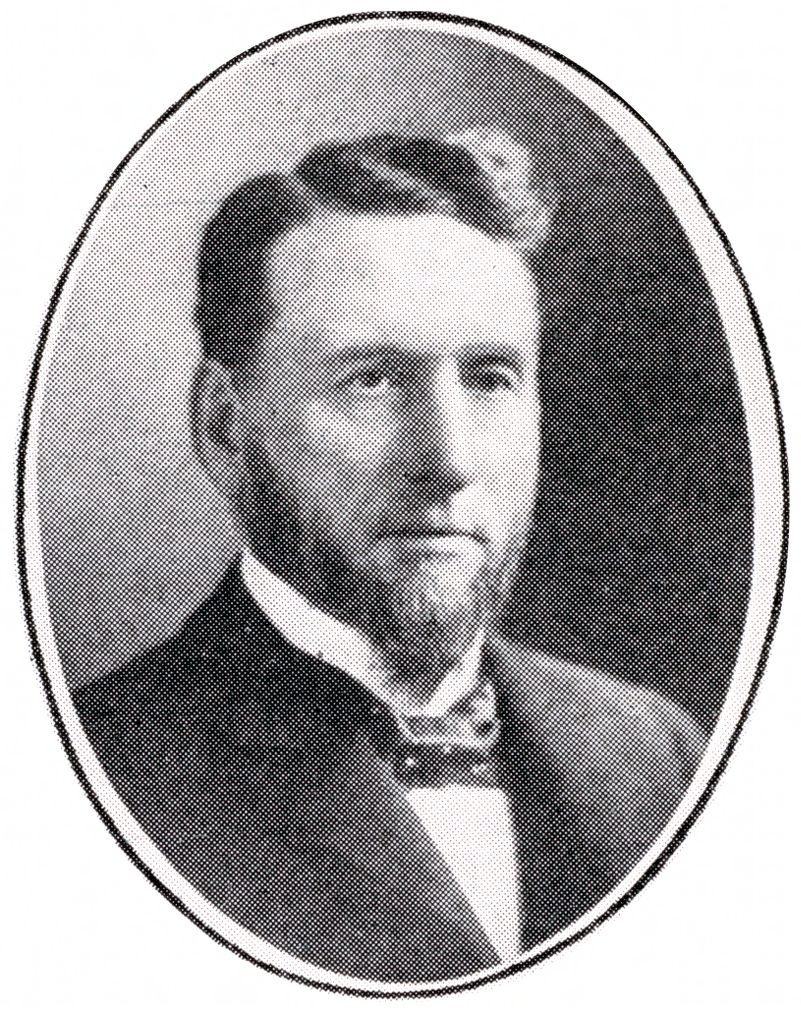

Nominee	George P. Wilson	Richard A. Jones
Party	Republican	Democratic
Popular vote	56,328	37,042
Percentage	58.92%	38.75%
Attorney General before election
George P. Wilson
Republican
Elected Attorney General
George P. Wilson
Republican

The 1877 Minnesota Attorney General election was held on November 6, 1877, in order to elect the attorney general of Minnesota. Republican nominee and incumbent attorney general George P. Wilson defeated Democratic nominee John R. Jones, Prohibition nominee James E. Child and Greenback nominee Nathan C. Martin. Squire L. Pierce was the original Greenback nominee, but he declined the nomination. Despite this, Pierce still received 208 votes in the election.

== General election ==
On election day, November 6, 1877, Republican nominee George P. Wilson won re-election by a margin of 19,286 votes against his foremost opponent Democratic nominee John R. Jones, thereby retaining Republican control over the office of attorney general. Wilson was sworn in for his third term on January 7, 1878.

=== Results ===
Minnesota Attorney General election, 1877
Party	Candidate	Votes	%
Republican	George P. Wilson (incumbent)	56,328	58.92
Democratic	John R. Jones	37,042	38.75
Prohibition	James E. Child	1,162	1.22
Greenback	Nathan C. Martin	856	0.90
Greenback	Squire L. Pierce	208	0.21
Total votes		95,596	100.00
Republican hold			
