= 1886 Minnesota Attorney General election =

- November 2, 1886
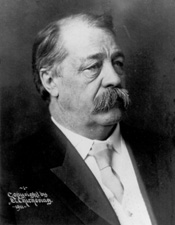

Nominee	Moses E. Clapp	John H. Ives
Party	Republican	Democratic
Popular vote	115,512	95,881
Percentage	52.43%	43.52%
Attorney General before election
William John Hahn
Republican
Elected Attorney General
Moses E. Clapp
Republican

The 1886 Minnesota Attorney General election was held on November 2, 1886, in order to elect the attorney general of Minnesota. Republican nominee Moses E. Clapp defeated Democratic nominee John H. Ives and Prohibition nominee W.M. Hatch.

== General election ==
On election day, November 2, 1886, Republican nominee Moses E. Clapp won the election by a margin of 19,631 votes against his foremost opponent Democratic nominee John H. Ives, thereby retaining Republican control over the office of attorney general. Clapp was sworn in as the 8th attorney general of Minnesota on January 5, 1887.

=== Results ===
Minnesota Attorney General election, 1886
Party	Candidate	Votes	%
Republican	Moses E. Clapp	115,512	52.43
Democratic	John H. Ives	95,881	43.52
Prohibition	W.M. Hatch	8,908	4.05
Total votes		220,301	100.00
Republican hold			
