= 1881 Minnesota Attorney General election =

- November 8, 1881
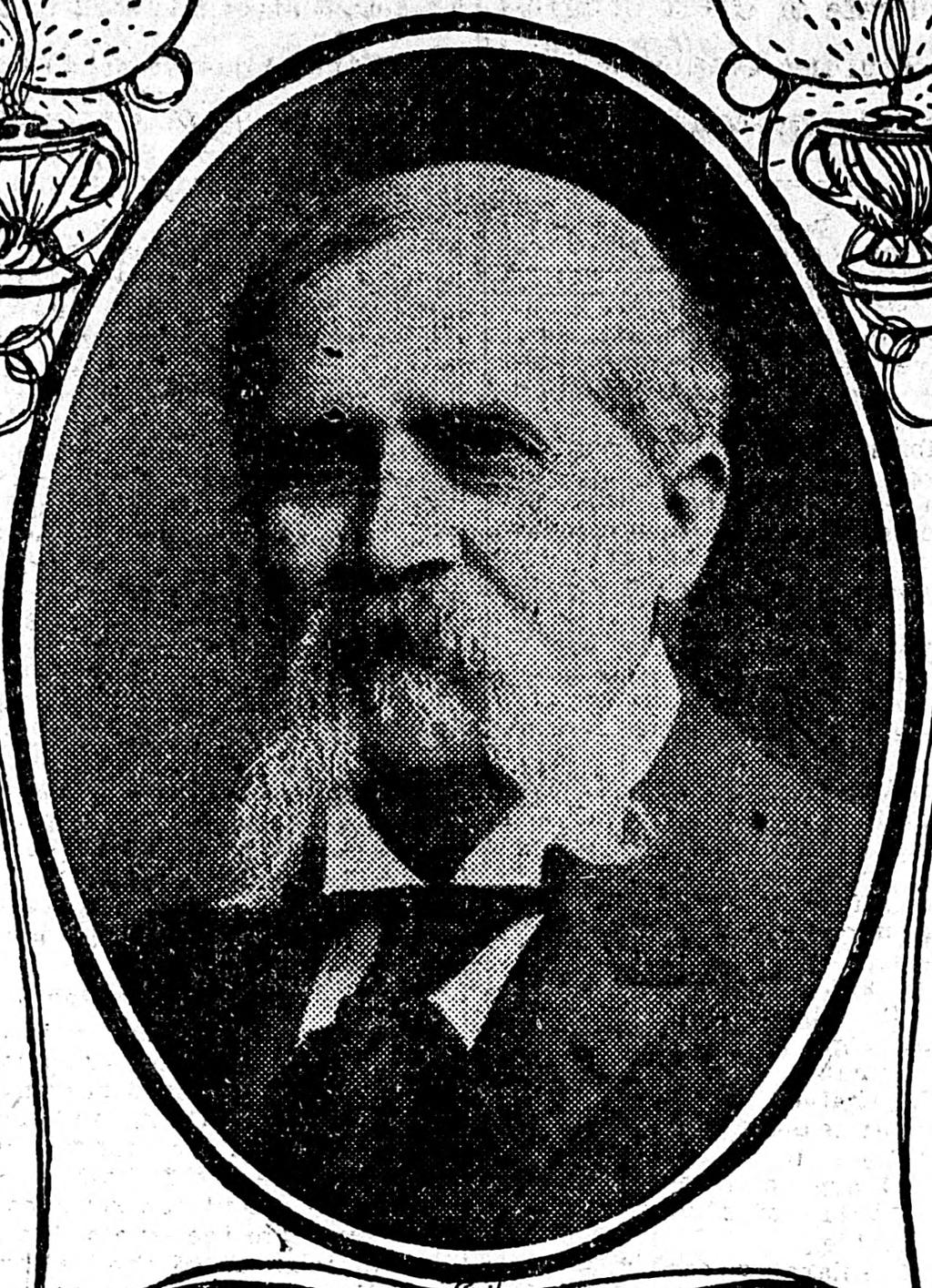

Nominee	William John Hahn	George N. Baxter
Party	Republican	Democratic
Popular vote	66,812	35,936
Percentage	63.08%	33.93%
Attorney General before election
William John Hahn (Acting)
Republican
Elected Attorney General
William John Hahn
Republican

The 1881 Minnesota attorney general election was held on November 8, 1881, in order to elect the attorney general of Minnesota. Republican nominee and incumbent acting attorney general William John Hahn defeated Democratic nominee George N. Baxter, Greenback nominee Joseph McKnight and Prohibition nominee Alfred W. Bangs.

== General election ==
On election day, November 8, 1881, Republican nominee William John Hahn won the election by a margin of 30,876 votes against his foremost opponent, Democratic nominee George N. Baxter, thereby retaining Republican control over the office of attorney general. Hahn was sworn in for his first full term on January 10, 1882.

=== Results ===
Minnesota attorney general election, 1881
Party	Candidate	Votes	%
Republican	William John Hahn (incumbent)	66,812	63.08
Democratic	George N. Baxter	35,936	33.93
Greenback	Joseph McKnight	2,598	2.45
Prohibition	Alfred W. Bangs	572	0.54
Total votes		105,918	100.00
Republican hold			
