= 1908 Minnesota Attorney General election =

- November 3, 1908
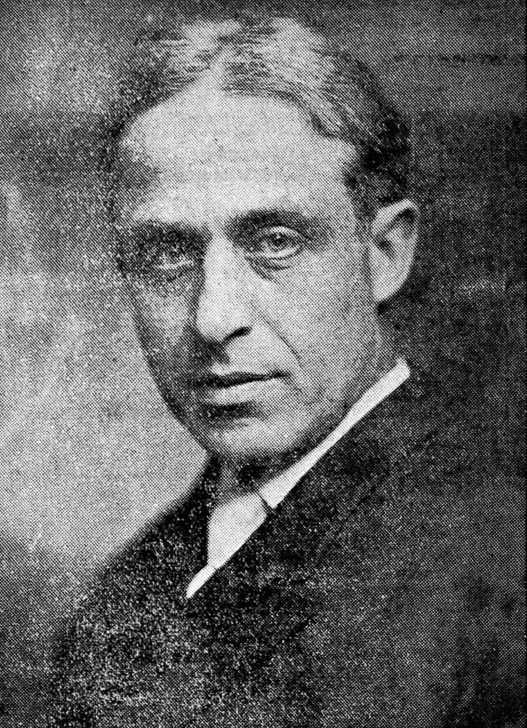

Nominee	George T. Simpson	Marvin E. Mathews
Party	Republican	Democratic
Popular vote	180,521	98,569
Percentage	61.11%	33.37%
Attorney General before election
Edward T. Young
Republican
Elected Attorney General
George T. Simpson
Republican

The 1908 Minnesota Attorney General election was held on November 3, 1908, in order to elect the attorney general of Minnesota. Republican nominee George T. Simpson defeated Democratic nominee Marvin E. Mathews, Public Ownership nominee Alfred W. Uhl and Independence League nominee John T. P. Power.

== General election ==
On election day, November 3, 1908, Republican nominee George T. Simpson won the election by a margin of 81,952 votes against his foremost opponent Democratic nominee Marvin E. Mathews, thereby retaining Republican control over the office of attorney general. Simpson was sworn in as the 13th attorney general of Minnesota on January 4, 1909.

=== Results ===
Minnesota Attorney General election, 1908
Party	Candidate	Votes	%
Republican	George T. Simpson	180,521	61.11
Democratic	Marvin E. Mathews	98,569	33.37
Socialist	Alfred W. Uhl	12,661	4.29
Independence	John T. P. Power	3,636	1.23
Total votes		295,387	100.00
Republican hold			
