= 1859 Minnesota Attorney General election =

- October 11, 1859
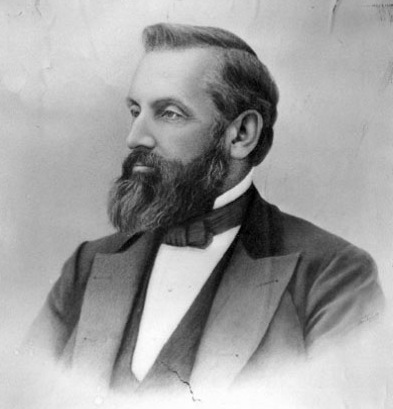

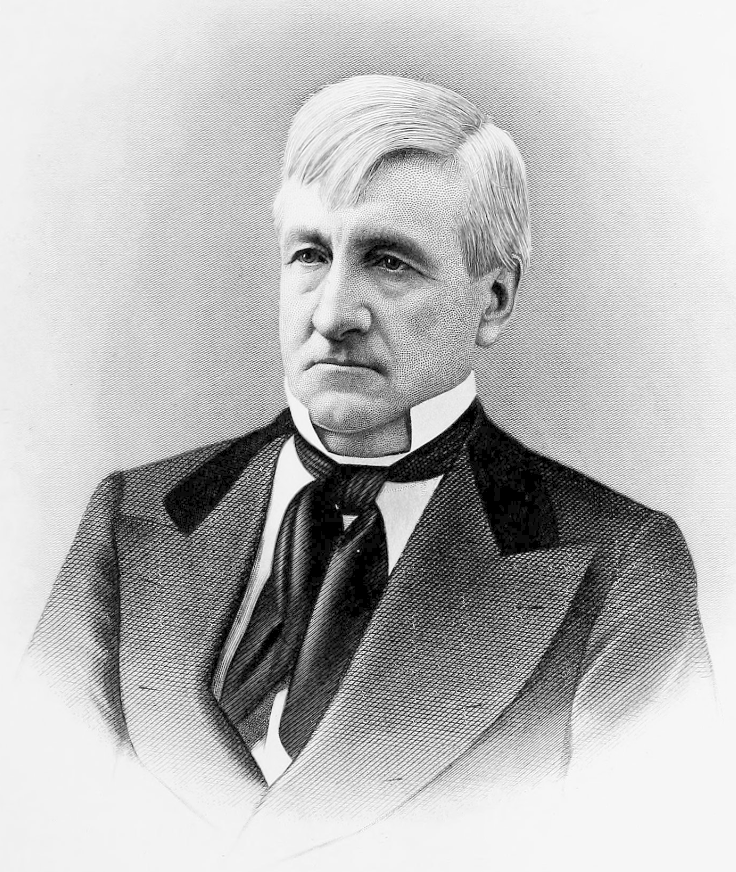
| Nominee | Gordon E. Cole | John B. Brisbin |
| Party | Republican | Democratic |
| Popular vote | 21,186 | 17,630 |
| Percentage | 54.58% | 45.42% |
Attorney General before election
Charles H. Berry
Democratic
Elected Attorney General
Gordon E. Cole
Republican

The 1859 Minnesota Attorney General election was held on October 11, 1859, in order to elect the attorney general of Minnesota. Republican nominee Gordon E. Cole defeated Democratic nominee and former Mayor of Saint Paul John B. Brisbin.

== General election ==
On election day, October 11, 1859, Republican nominee Gordon E. Cole won the election by a margin of 3,556 votes against his opponent Democratic nominee John B. Brisbin, thereby gaining Republican control over the office of attorney general. Cole was sworn in as the 2nd attorney general of Minnesota on January 2, 1860.

=== Results ===
Minnesota Attorney General election, 1859
| Party | Candidate | Votes | % |
|---|---|---|---|
| Republican | Gordon E. Cole | 21,186 | 54.58 |
| Democratic | John B. Brisbin | 17,630 | 45.42 |
| Total votes | | 38,816 | 100.00 |
| Republican gain from Democratic | | | |
