= 1883 Minnesota Attorney General election =

- November 6, 1883
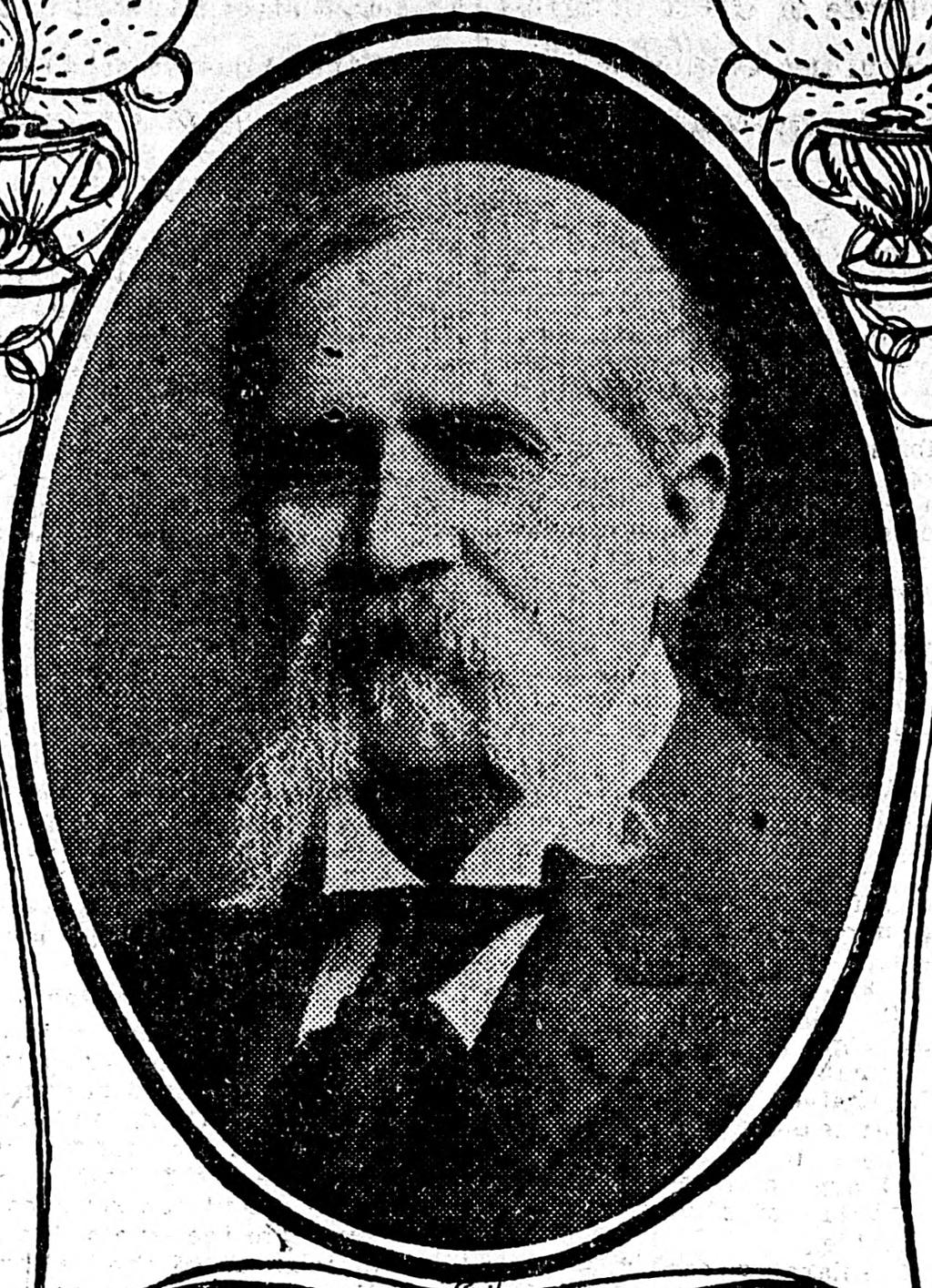

Nominee	William John Hahn	John W. Willis
Party	Republican	Democratic
Popular vote	79,324	50,973
Percentage	58.63%	37.67%
Attorney General before election
William John Hahn
Republican
Elected Attorney General
William John Hahn
Republican

The 1883 Minnesota Attorney General election was held on November 6, 1883, in order to elect the attorney general of Minnesota. Republican nominee and incumbent attorney general William John Hahn defeated Democratic nominee John W. Willis and Prohibition nominee Francis Cadwell.

== General election ==
On election day, November 6, 1883, Republican nominee William John Hahn won re-election by a margin of 28,351 votes against his foremost opponent Democratic nominee John W. Willis, thereby retaining Republican control over the office of attorney general. Hahn was sworn in for his second full term on January 10, 1884.

=== Results ===
Minnesota Attorney General election, 1883
Party	Candidate	Votes	%
Republican	William John Hahn (incumbent)	79,324	58.63
Democratic	John W. Willis	50,973	37.67
Prohibition	Francis Cadwell	4,925	3.64
Write-in		79	0.06
Total votes		135,301	100.00
Republican hold			
