= 1873 Minnesota Attorney General election =

- November 4, 1873
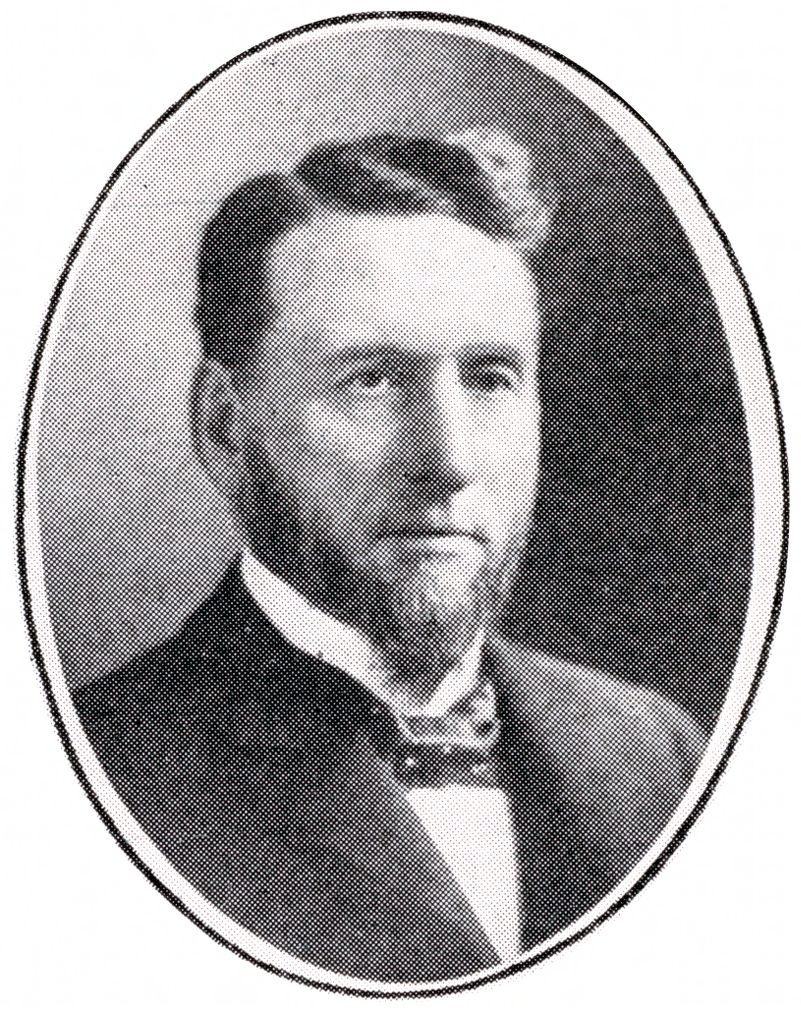

Nominee	George P. Wilson	William Clough
Party	Republican	Democratic
Popular vote	40,751	35,757
Percentage	53.26%	46.74%
Attorney General before election
Francis R. E. Cornell
Republican
Elected Attorney General
George P. Wilson
Republican

The 1873 Minnesota Attorney General election was held on November 4, 1873, in order to elect the attorney general of Minnesota. Republican nominee and incumbent member of the Minnesota House of Representatives from the 8th District George P. Wilson defeated Democratic nominee William Clough.

== General election ==
On election day, November 4, 1873, Republican nominee George P. Wilson won the election by a margin of 4,994 votes against his opponent Democratic nominee William Clough, thereby retaining Republican control over the office of attorney general. Wilson was sworn in as the 5th attorney general of Minnesota on January 7, 1874.

=== Results ===
Minnesota Attorney General election, 1873
Party	Candidate	Votes	%
Republican	George P. Wilson	40,751	53.26
Democratic	William Clough	35,757	46.74
Total votes		76,508	100.00
Republican hold			
