= William J. Donahower =

American politician (1865–1928)

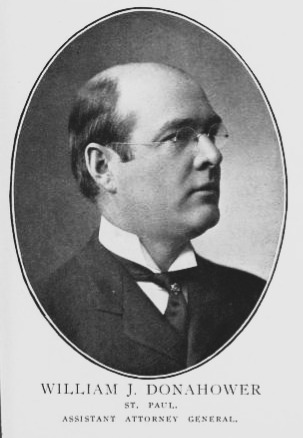
- Donahower c.1902

11th Minnesota Attorney General
- In office April 1, 1904 – January 2, 1905
- Governor: Samuel Rinnah Van Sant
- Preceded by: Wallace B. Douglas
- Succeeded by: Edward T. Young

Personal details
- Born: William James Donahower; 1865 St. Peter, Minnesota, U.S.
- Died: June 25, 1928 (aged 62–63) Saint Paul, Minnesota, U.S.
- Resting place: Woodlawn Cemetery, Kasota Township, Le Sueur County, Minnesota, U.S.
- Party: Republican

William James Donahower (c.1865 - June 25, 1928), sometimes written as W. J. Donahower, was a Minnesota lawyer and politician who served as the interim eleventh Minnesota Attorney General from 1904 to 1905. He later served on the Minnesota Supreme Court.

== Early life ==
William James Donahower was born in 1865 in St. Peter, Minnesota to parents Frederick Augustus Donahower and Helen M. Manger. Donahower was educated in the local St. Peter high school and later received degrees from both the University of Minnesota and Cornell University. Shortly before entering politics Donahower served as a law enforcement officer in the United States Marshals Service under the William McKinley administration.

== Political career ==
Donahower first entered politics beginning in 1901, serving as the Assistant Attorney General under Attorney General Wallace B. Douglas until 1904. Douglas resigned from his position on April 5, 1904 due to Associate Justice Loren W. Collins resigning from the Minnesota Supreme Court. Because of this, Donahower eventually became the "acting" Minnesota Attorney General until the 1904 Minnesota Attorney General election which was won by Edward T. Young.

Donahower unsuccessfully ran for Attorney General again in 1926 but would end up losing to incumbent Clifford L. Hilton in the Republican primary by a margin of 65.27%. In total Donahower only won 17.36% of the Republican vote.

== Personal life ==
Donahower was married to Grace Kendricks of Saint Paul. Together they had three sons.
