= 1888 Minnesota Attorney General election =

- November 6, 1888
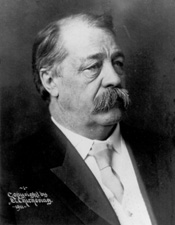

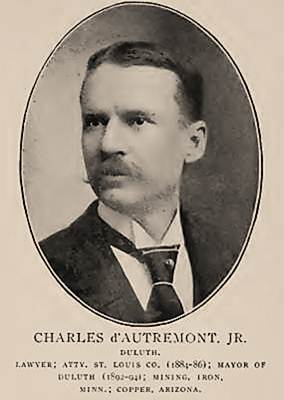

Nominee	Moses E. Clapp	Charles d'Autremont	Charles E. Shannon
Party	Republican	Democratic	Prohibition
Popular vote	142,074	104,202	15,629
Percentage	54.11%	39.69%	5.95%
Attorney General before election
Moses E. Clapp
Republican
Elected Attorney General
Moses E. Clapp
Republican

The 1888 Minnesota Attorney General election was held on November 6, 1888, in order to elect the attorney general of Minnesota. Republican nominee and incumbent attorney general Moses E. Clapp defeated Democratic nominee Charles d'Autremont, Prohibition nominee Charles E. Shannon and Union Labor nominee William Welch.

== General election ==
On election day, November 6, 1888, Republican nominee Moses E. Clapp won re-election by a margin of 37,872 votes against his foremost opponent Democratic nominee Charles d'Autremont, thereby retaining Republican control over the office of attorney general. Clapp was sworn in for his second term on January 9, 1889.

=== Results ===
Minnesota Attorney General election, 1888
Party	Candidate	Votes	%
Republican	Moses E. Clapp (incumbent)	142,074	54.11
Democratic	Charles d'Autremont	104,202	39.69
Prohibition	Charles E. Shannon	15,629	5.95
Union Labor	William Welch	644	0.25
Total votes		262,549	100.00
Republican hold			
