= 1857 Minnesota Attorney General election =

- October 13, 1857
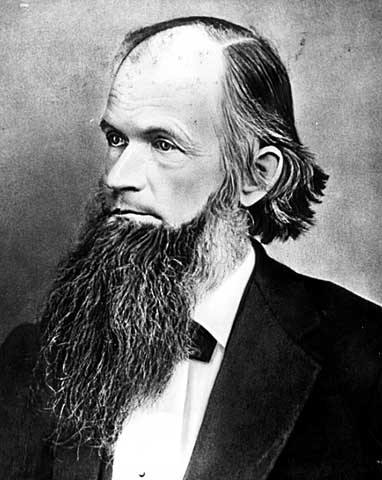

Nominee	Charles H. Berry	George Nourse
Party	Democratic	Republican
Popular vote	17,703	16,804
Percentage	50.96%	48.38%
Attorney General before election
LaFayette Emmett (Territorial)
Democratic
Elected Attorney General
Charles H. Berry
Democratic

The 1857 Minnesota Attorney General election was held on October 13, 1857, in order to elect the first attorney general of Minnesota upon Minnesota acquiring statehood on May 11, 1858. Democratic nominee Charles H. Berry defeated Republican nominee George Nourse.

== General election ==
On election day, October 13, 1857, Democratic nominee Charles H. Berry won the election by a margin of 899 votes against his opponent Republican nominee George Nourse, thereby retaining Democratic control over the office of attorney general. Berry was sworn in as the 1st attorney general of Minnesota on May 11, 1858.

=== Results ===
Minnesota Attorney General election, 1857
Party	Candidate	Votes	%
Democratic	Charles H. Berry	17,703	50.96
Republican	George Nourse	16,804	48.38
Write-in		230	0.66
Total votes		34,737	100.00
Democratic hold			
