= 1875 Minnesota Attorney General election =

- November 2, 1875
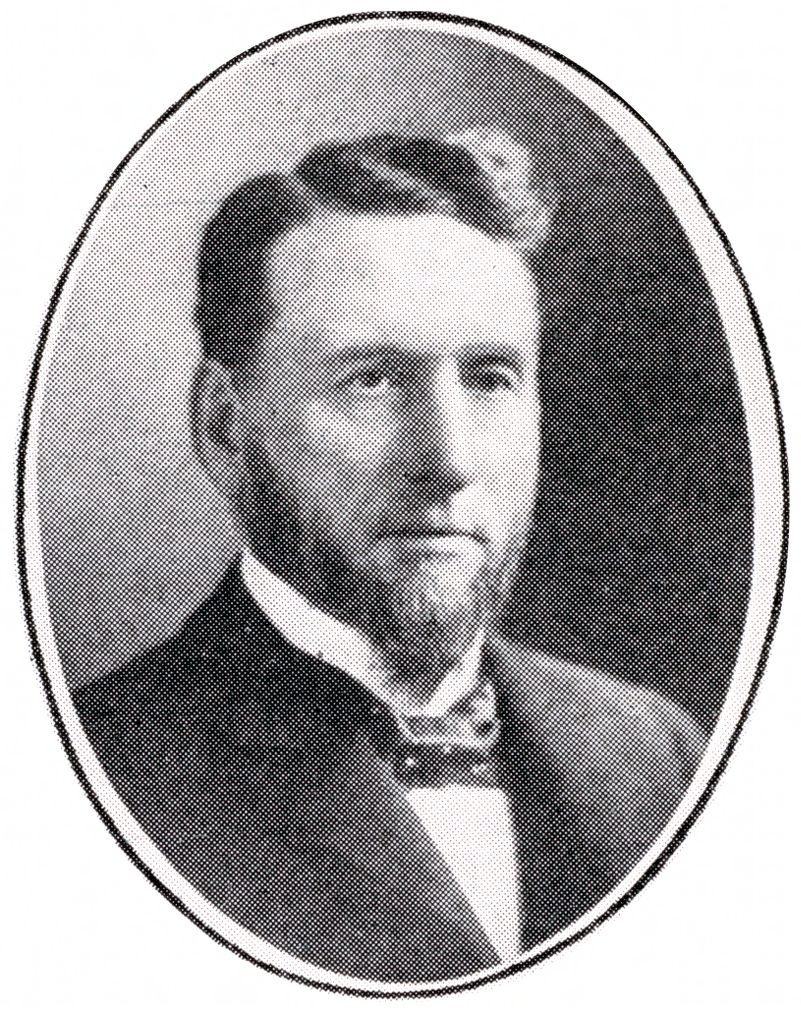

| Nominee | George P. Wilson | Richard A. Jones |
| Party | Republican | Democratic |
| Popular vote | 45,091 | 34,683 |
| Percentage | 54.64% | 42.03% |
Attorney General before election
George P. Wilson
Republican
Elected Attorney General
George P. Wilson
Republican

The 1875 Minnesota Attorney General election was held on November 2, 1875, in order to elect the attorney general of Minnesota. Republican nominee and incumbent attorney general George P. Wilson defeated Democratic nominee and former member of the Minnesota House of Representatives Richard A. Jones and Temperance nominee Cornelius M. McCarthy.

== General election ==
On election day, November 2, 1875, Republican nominee George P. Wilson won re-election by a margin of 10,408 votes against his foremost opponent Democratic nominee Richard A. Jones, thereby retaining Republican control over the office of attorney general. Wilson was sworn in for his second term on January 7, 1876.

=== Results ===
Minnesota Attorney General election, 1875
| Party | Candidate | Votes | % |
|---|---|---|---|
| Republican | George P. Wilson (incumbent) | 45,091 | 54.64 |
| Democratic | Richard A. Jones | 34,683 | 42.03 |
| Prohibition | Cornelius M. McCarthy | 2,749 | 3.33 |
| Total votes | | 82,523 | 100.00 |
| Republican hold | | | |
