= 1906 Minnesota Attorney General election =

- November 6, 1906
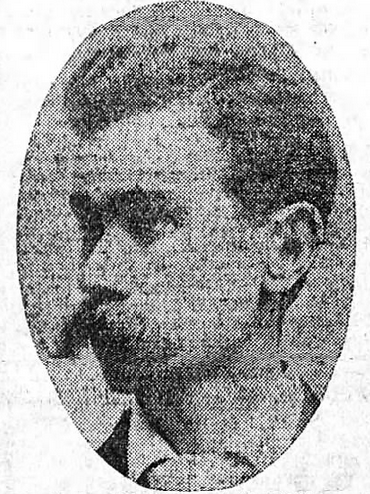

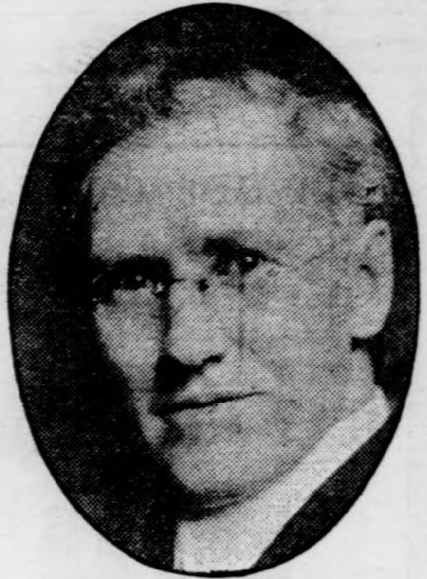
Nominee	Edward T. Young	John Dwan
Party	Republican	Democratic
Popular vote	169,908	85,154
Percentage	66.61%	33.39%
Attorney General before election
Edward T. Young
Republican
Elected Attorney General
Edward T. Young
Republican

The 1906 Minnesota Attorney General election was held on November 6, 1906, in order to elect the attorney general of Minnesota. Republican nominee and incumbent attorney general Edward T. Young defeated Democratic nominee John Dwan.

== General election ==
On election day, November 6, 1906, Republican nominee Edward T. Young won re-election by a margin of 84,754 votes against his opponent Democratic nominee John Dwan, thereby retaining Republican control over the office of attorney general. Young was sworn in for his second term on January 7, 1907.

=== Results ===
Minnesota Attorney General election, 1906
Party	Candidate	Votes	%
Republican	Edward T. Young (incumbent)	169,908	66.61
Democratic	John Dwan	85,154	33.39
Total votes		255,062	100.00
Republican hold			
