= 1948 Minnesota Attorney General election =

- November 2, 1948
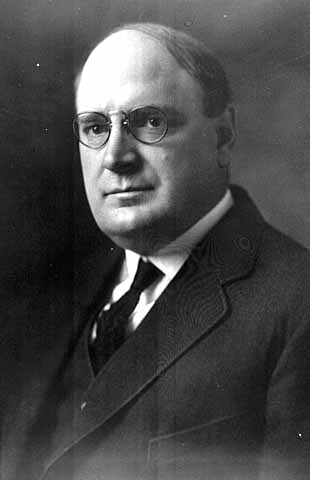

Nominee	Joseph A. A. Burnquist	Francis M. Smith
Party	Republican	Democratic (DFL)
Popular vote	624,891	524,607
Percentage	54.36%	45.64%
- County results Burnquist: 50-60% 60-70% 70-80% Smith: 50-60% 60-70%
Attorney General before election
Joseph A. A. Burnquist
Republican
Elected Attorney General
Joseph A. A. Burnquist
Republican

The 1948 Minnesota Attorney General election was held on November 2, 1948, in order to elect the attorney general of Minnesota. Republican nominee and incumbent attorney general Joseph A. A. Burnquist defeated Democratic–Farmer–Labor nominee Francis M. Smith.

== General election ==
On election day, November 2, 1948, Republican nominee Joseph A. A. Burnquist won re-election by a margin of 100,284 votes against his opponent Democratic–Farmer–Labor nominee Francis M. Smith, thereby retaining Republican control over the office of attorney general. Burnquist was sworn in for his sixth term on January 3, 1949.

=== Results ===
Minnesota Attorney General election, 1948
Party	Candidate	Votes	%
Republican	Joseph A. A. Burnquist (incumbent)	624,891	54.36
Democratic (DFL)	Francis M. Smith	524,607	45.64
Total votes		1,149,498	100.00
Republican hold			
