= 1944 Minnesota Attorney General election =

- November 7, 1944
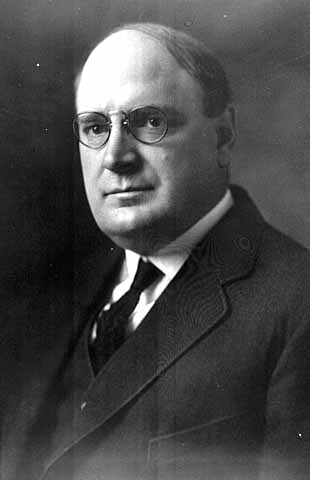

Nominee	Joseph A. A. Burnquist	Erling Swenson
Party	Republican	Democratic (DFL)
Popular vote	649,780	437,633
Percentage	59.76%	40.24%
- County results Burnquist: 50-60% 60-70% 70-80% 80-90% Swenson: 50-60% 60-70%
Attorney General before election
Joseph A. A. Burnquist
Republican
Elected Attorney General
Joseph A. A. Burnquist
Republican

The 1944 Minnesota Attorney General election was held on November 7, 1944, in order to elect the attorney general of Minnesota. Republican nominee and incumbent attorney general Joseph A. A. Burnquist defeated Democratic–Farmer–Labor nominee and former member of the Minnesota Senate Erling Swenson.

== General election ==
On election day, November 7, 1944, Republican nominee Joseph A. A. Burnquist won re-election by a margin of 212,147 votes against his opponent Democratic–Farmer–Labor nominee Erling Swenson, thereby retaining Republican control over the office of attorney general. Burnquist was sworn in for his fourth term on January 2, 1945.

=== Results ===
Minnesota Attorney General election, 1944
Party	Candidate	Votes	%
Republican	Joseph A. A. Burnquist (incumbent)	649,780	59.76
Democratic (DFL)	Erling Swenson	437,633	40.24
Total votes		1,087,413	100.00
Republican hold			
