= 1946 Minnesota Attorney General election =

- November 5, 1946
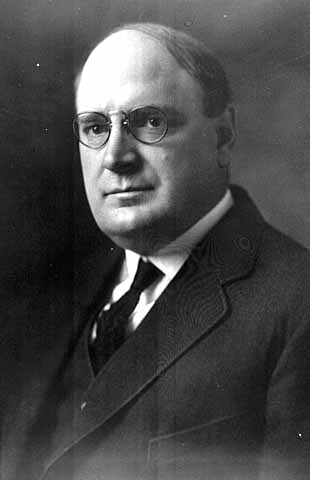

Nominee	Joseph A. A. Burnquist	Walter C. Boland
Party	Republican	Democratic (DFL)
Popular vote	526,331	325,764
Percentage	61.77%	38.23%
- County results Burnquist: 50-60% 60-70% 70-80% 80-90% Boland: 50-60%
Attorney General before election
Joseph A. A. Burnquist
Republican
Elected Attorney General
Joseph A. A. Burnquist
Republican

The 1946 Minnesota Attorney General election was held on November 5, 1946, in order to elect the attorney general of Minnesota. Republican nominee and incumbent attorney general Joseph A. A. Burnquist defeated Democratic–Farmer–Labor nominee Walter C. Boland.

== General election ==
On election day, November 5, 1946, Republican nominee Joseph A. A. Burnquist won re-election by a margin of 200,567 votes against his opponent Democratic–Farmer–Labor nominee Walter C. Boland, thereby retaining Republican control over the office of attorney general. Burnquist was sworn in for his fifth term on January 3, 1947.

=== Results ===
Minnesota Attorney General election, 1946
Party	Candidate	Votes	%
Republican	Joseph A. A. Burnquist (incumbent)	526,331	61.77
Democratic (DFL)	Walter C. Boland	325,764	38.23
Total votes		852,095	100.00
Republican hold			
