= 1982 Minnesota Attorney General election =

- November 2, 1982
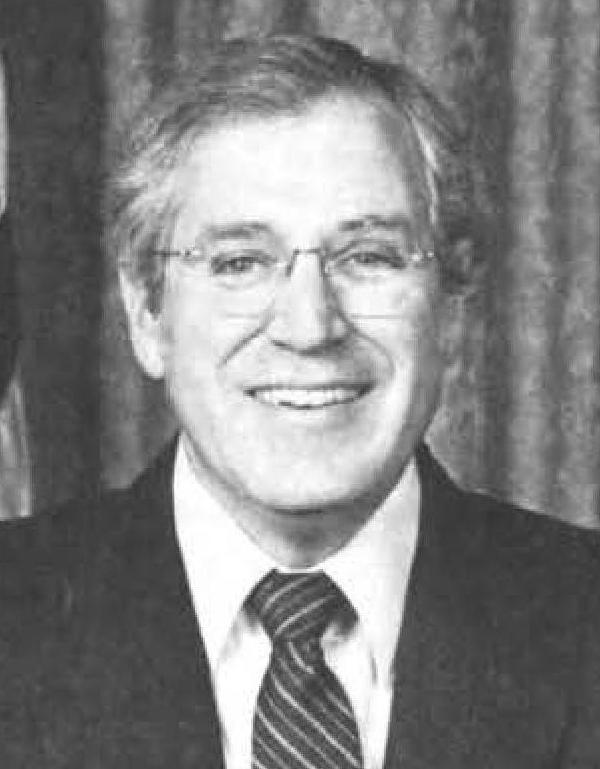

Nominee	Hubert Humphrey III	Elliot C. Rothenberg
Party	Democratic (DFL)	Republican
Popular vote	1,082,539	653,162
Percentage	61.72%	37.24%
- County results Humphrey: 50–60% 60–70% 70–80% 80–90% Rothenberg: 50–60%
Attorney General before election
Warren Spannaus
Democratic (DFL)
Elected Attorney General
Hubert Humphrey III
Democratic (DFL)

The 1982 Minnesota Attorney General election was held on November 2, 1982, in order to elect the attorney general of Minnesota. Democratic–Farmer–Labor nominee and incumbent member of the Minnesota Senate Hubert Humphrey III defeated Republican nominee and incumbent member of the Minnesota House of Representatives Elliot C. Rothenberg and Conservative People's nominee Samuel A. Faulk.

== General election ==
On election day, November 2, 1982, Democratic–Farmer–Labor nominee Hubert Humphrey III won the election by a margin of 429,377 votes against his foremost opponent Republican nominee Elliot C. Rothenberg, thereby retaining Democratic–Farmer–Labor Party control over the office of attorney general. Humphrey was sworn in as the 27th attorney general of Minnesota on January 3, 1983.

=== Results ===
Minnesota Attorney General election, 1982
Party	Candidate	Votes	%
Democratic (DFL)	Hubert Humphrey III	1,082,539	61.72
Republican	Elliot C. Rothenberg	653,162	37.24
Conservative People's	Samuel A. Faulk	18,278	1.04
Total votes		1,753,979	100.00
Democratic (DFL) hold			
