= 1954 Minnesota Attorney General election =

- November 2, 1954
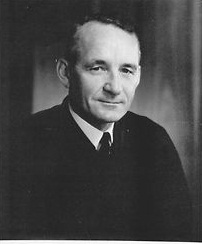

Nominee	Miles Lord	Bernhard LeVander
Party	Democratic (DFL)	Republican
Popular vote	587,883	526,761
Percentage	52.74%	47.26%
- County results Lord: 50–60% 60–70% 70–80% LeVander: 50–60% 60–70% 70–80%
Attorney General before election
Joseph A. A. Burnquist
Republican
Elected Attorney General
Miles Lord
Democratic (DFL)

The 1954 Minnesota Attorney General election was held on November 2, 1954, in order to elect the attorney general of Minnesota. Democratic–Farmer–Labor nominee Miles Lord defeated Republican nominee Bernhard LeVander.

== General election ==
On election day, November 2, 1954, Democratic–Farmer–Labor nominee Miles Lord won the election by a margin of 61,122 votes against his opponent Republican nominee Bernhard LeVander, thereby gaining Democratic–Farmer–Labor control over the office of attorney general. Lord was sworn in as the 22nd attorney general of Minnesota on January 3, 1955.

=== Results ===
Minnesota Attorney General election, 1954
Party	Candidate	Votes	%
Democratic (DFL)	Miles Lord	587,883	52.74
Republican	Bernhard LeVander	526,761	47.26
Total votes		1,114,644	100.00
Democratic (DFL) gain from Republican			
