= 1960 Minnesota Attorney General election =

- November 8, 1960
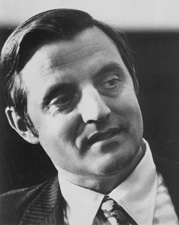

Nominee	Walter Mondale	Gaylord A. Saetre
Party	Democratic (DFL)	Republican
Popular vote	871,495	624,759
Percentage	58.25%	41.75%
- County results Mondale: 50–60% 60–70% 70–80% Saetre: 50–60% 60–70%
Attorney General before election
Walter Mondale (Acting)
Democratic (DFL)
Elected Attorney General
Walter Mondale
Democratic (DFL)

The 1960 Minnesota Attorney General election was held on November 8, 1960, in order to elect the attorney general of Minnesota. Democratic–Farmer–Labor nominee and incumbent acting attorney general Walter Mondale defeated Republican nominee Gaylord A. Saetre.

== General election ==
On election day, November 8, 1960, Democratic–Farmer–Labor nominee Walter Mondale won the election by a margin of 246,736 votes against his opponent Republican nominee Gaylord A. Saetre, thereby retaining Democratic–Farmer–Labor control over the office of attorney general. Mondale was sworn in for his first full term on January 3, 1961.

=== Results ===
Minnesota Attorney General election, 1960
Party	Candidate	Votes	%
Democratic (DFL)	Walter Mondale (incumbent)	871,495	58.25
Republican	Gaylord A. Saetre	624,759	41.75
Total votes		1,496,254	100.00
Democratic (DFL) hold			
