= Charles M. Start =

American judge

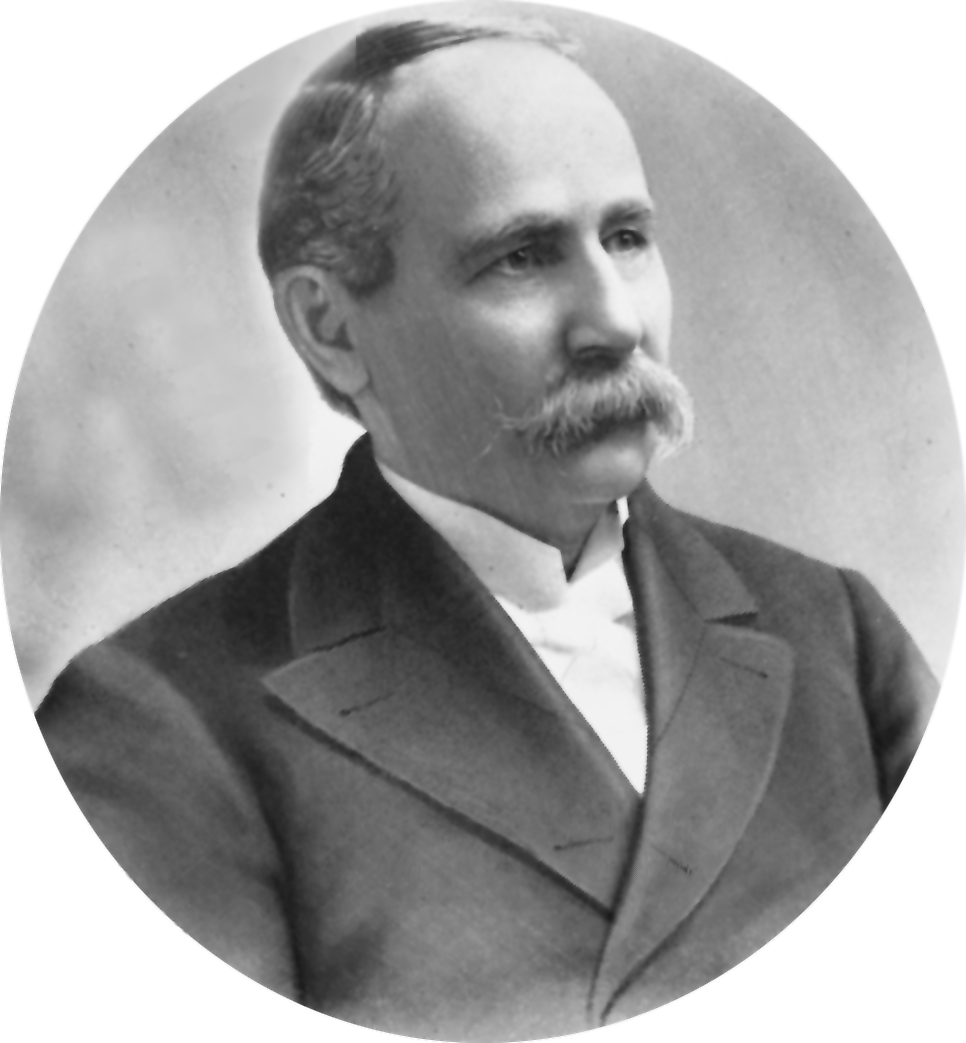
- Start c.1904

6th Minnesota Attorney General
- In office 1880–1881
- Preceded by: George P. Wilson
- Succeeded by: William John Hahn

Chief Justice of the Minnesota Supreme Court
- In office 1895–1913
- Preceded by: Thomas Canty
- Succeeded by: Calvin Brown

Personal details
- Born: Charles Monroe Start; October 4, 1839 Bakersfield, Vermont, U.S.
- Died: December 19, 1919 (aged 80) Saint Paul, Minnesota, U.S.
- Resting place: Oakwood Cemetery; Rochester, Minnesota, U.S.
- Other political affiliations: Republican
- Spouse: Clara Wilson
- Relations: Henry R. Start (brother)
- Children: 2
- Occupation: Lawyer chief justice politician

Military service
- Allegiance: United States of America
- Branch/service: Union Army
- Years of service: 1861-1863
- Rank: First Lieutenant
- Unit: Company I, 10th Vermont Infantry Regiment
- Battles/wars: American Civil War

Charles Monroe Start (October 4, 1839 – December 19, 1919) was a Minnesota jurist and a Chief Justice of the Minnesota Supreme Court.

== Biography ==
Start was born in Bakersfield, Vermont, the son of Simeon Gould Start and Mary Sophia (Barnes) Start. His father was a farmer who also served in local offices including justice of the peace. Start's younger brother, Henry R. Start, served as a member of the Vermont Supreme Court. Charles Start was educated in Bakersfield and at Barre Academy, studied law with William C. Wilson, and attained admission to the bar.

Wilson joined the Union Army during the American Civil War. In July 1862 he enlisted in Company I, 10th Vermont Volunteer Infantry, and he received a commission as a first lieutenant shortly after enlisting. However, ill health caused him to resign his commission in December, and he left the unit while it was serving in Virginia. In August 1863, Start married Wilson's daughter, Clara A. Wilson (1843-1924). They were the parents of two children, one of whom, daughter Clara L. (1868-1950), lived to adulthood. He moved to Rochester, Minnesota in 1863, and established himself in a law practice. In 1866, he formed a law partnership with Ozora P. Stearns.

A Republican, he served as Rochester city attorney beginning in 1864. His subsequent offices included Olmsted County Attorney (1871–1879), Minnesota Attorney General (1880–1881), Minnesota District Court Judge of the Third District (1881–1895), and Chief Justice of the Minnesota Supreme Court (1895–1913).

Start retired from the court in January 1913 and was succeeded as Chief Justice by Calvin L. Brown. Judge Start died at his home in Saint Paul, Minnesota on December 19, 1919. He was buried at Oakwood Cemetery in Rochester.

== Electoral history ==
=== 1879 ===
1879 Minnesota Attorney General election
Party	Candidate	Votes	%
Republican	Charles M. (C.M.) Start	60,816	57.28
Democratic	P.M. Babcock	38,604	36.36
Greenback	Oscar Stephenson	4,064	3.83
Prohibition	Alfred W. Bangs	2,697	2.54
Total votes		106,181	100.00
Republican hold			

== Sources ==
- Proceedings in Memory of Chief Justice Start, April 30, 1920 - Minnesota State Law Library

Legal offices
Preceded by George P. Wilson	Minnesota Attorney General; 1880–1881	Succeeded by William J. Hahn
