= 1916 Minnesota Attorney General election =

- November 7, 1916
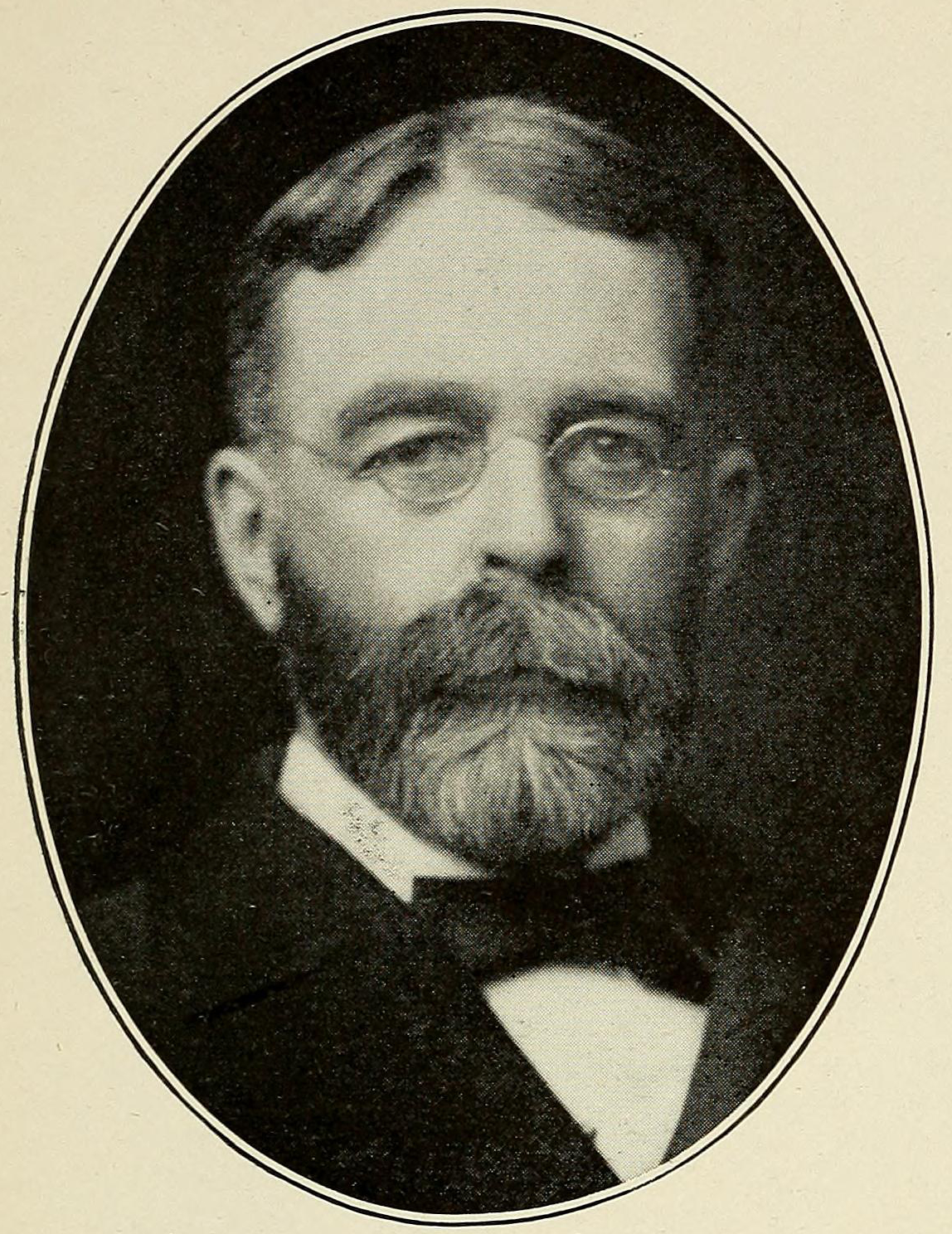
| Nominee | Lyndon A. Smith |
| Party | Republican |
| Popular vote | 263,285 |
| Percentage | 100.00% |
Attorney General before election
Lyndon A. Smith
Republican
Elected Attorney General
Lyndon A. Smith
Republican

The 1916 Minnesota Attorney General election was held on November 7, 1916, in order to elect the attorney general of Minnesota. Republican nominee and incumbent attorney general Lyndon A. Smith won re-election as he ran unopposed.

== General election ==
On election day, November 7, 1916, Republican nominee Lyndon A. Smith won re-election as he ran unopposed, thereby retaining Republican control over the office of attorney general. Smith was sworn in for his third full term on January 3, 1917.

=== Results ===
Minnesota Attorney General election, 1916
| Party | Candidate | Votes | % |
|---|---|---|---|
| Republican | Lyndon A. Smith (incumbent) | 263,285 | 100.00 |
| Total votes | | 263,285 | 100.00 |
| Republican hold | | | |
