= Minnesota Attorney General =

Attorney general for the U.S. state of Minnesota

Attorney General of Minnesota
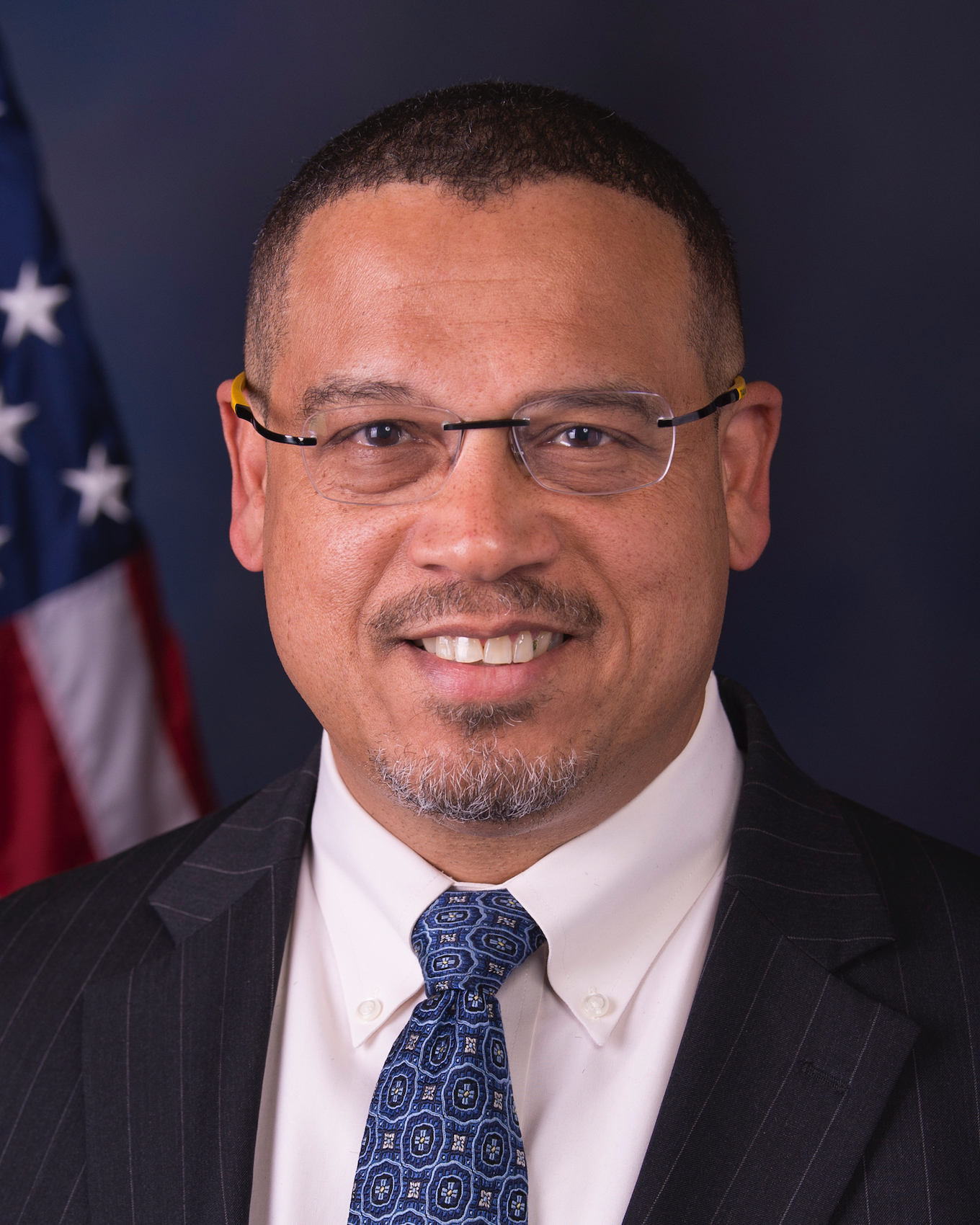
- Incumbent; Keith Ellison since January 7, 2019
- Style: Mister or Madam Attorney General (informal); The Honorable (formal)
- Member of: Executive Council, among others
- Seat: Minnesota State Capitol; Saint Paul, Minnesota
- Appointer: General election
- Term length: Four years, no term limits
- Constituting instrument: Minnesota Constitution of 1858, Article V
- Inaugural holder: Charles H. Berry
- Formation: May 11, 1858 (168 years ago)
- Succession: Sixth
- Salary: $190,000
- Website: Official page

The attorney general of Minnesota is a constitutional officer in the executive branch of the U.S. state of Minnesota. Thirty individuals have held the office of Attorney General since statehood. The incumbent is Keith Ellison, a Democratic-Farmer-Labor Party member.

== Election and term of office ==
The attorney general is elected by the people on Election Day in November, and takes office on the first Monday of the next January. There is no limit to the number of terms an attorney general may hold. To be elected attorney general, a person must be a qualified voter, permanently resident in the state of Minnesota at least 30 days prior to the election, and at least 21 years of age.

In the event of a vacancy in the office of the attorney general, the governor may appoint a successor to serve the balance of the term. The attorney general may also be recalled by the voters or removed from office through an impeachment trial.

== Powers and duties ==
The attorney general is the chief law officer for the state of Minnesota, and as such, represents the state of Minnesota parens patriae in both state and federal court as well as in administrative proceedings, such as matters of adjudication or rulemaking. In addition, the Office of the Attorney General handles felony criminal appeals, issues formal opinions on questions of constitutional or statutory law, and provides legal advice, litigation, and appellate services to over 100 state agencies, boards, and commissions. On occasion, these services are extended to rural county prosecutors in serious felonies and criminal prosecutions. Separately, the attorney general's office enforces state antitrust and consumer protection laws, regulates charities, and advocates for residents and small businesses in utility matters.

In addition to their functional responsibilities, the attorney general is an ex officio member of the Board of Pardons, the Executive Council, the Land Exchange Board, the Governing Board for the Minnesota Historical Society, the Records Disposition Panel, and the State Board of Investment.

== List of attorneys general ==
=== Minnesota Territory ===
Image	Name	Took office	Left office	Political party
	Lorenzo A. Babcock	1849	1853	Whig
	LaFayette Emmett	1853	1858	Democratic

In 1886, elections were moved from odd years to even years. Beginning with the 1962 election, the term of the office increased from two to four years.

Parties

DFL (8) Republican (19) Farmer-Labor (2) Union Democrat (1)

=== State of Minnesota ===
No.	Image	Name	Term of office	Political party	Election	Law school
1		Charles H. Berry	1858–1860	Republican	1857	Read law
2		Gordon E. Cole	1860–1866	Republican	1859; 1861; 1863	Harvard Law School
3		William J. Colvill	1866–1868	Union Democrat	1865	Read law under Millard Fillmore
4		Francis R. E. Cornell	1868–1874	Republican	1867; 1869; 1871	Read law
5		George P. Wilson	1874–1880	Republican	1873; 1875; 1877	Read law
6		Charles M. Start	1880–1881	Republican	1879	Read law under William C. Wilson
7		William John Hahn	1881–1887	Republican	1881; 1883	Read law
8		Moses E. Clapp	1887–1893	Republican	1886; 1888; 1890	University of Wisconsin Law School
9		Henry W. Childs	1893–1899	Republican	1892; 1894; 1896	Read law
10		Wallace B. Douglas	1899–1904	Republican	1898; 1900; 1902	University of Michigan Law School
11		William J. Donahower	1904–1905	Republican		Read law
12		Edward T. Young	1905–1909	Republican	1904; 1906	University of Minnesota Law School
13		George T. Simpson	1909–1912	Republican	1908; 1910	Read law
14		Lyndon A. Smith	1912–1918	Republican	1912; 1914; 1916	Georgetown University Law Center
15		Clifford L. Hilton	1918–1927	Republican	1918; 1920; 1922; 1924; 1926	University of Wisconsin Law School
16		Albert F. Pratt	1927–1928	Republican		University of Minnesota Law School
17		G. Aaron Youngquist	1928–1929	Republican	1928	St. Paul College of Law
18		Henry N. Benson	1929–1933	Republican	1930	University of Minnesota Law School
19		Harry H. Peterson	1933–1936	Farmer-Labor	1932; 1934; 1936	University of Minnesota Law School
20		William S. Ervin	1936–1939	Farmer-Labor		University of Minnesota Law School
21		Joseph A. A. Burnquist	1939–1955	Republican	1938; 1940; 1942; 1944; 1946; 1948; 1950; 1952	University of Minnesota Law School
22		Miles Lord	1955–1960	DFL	1954; 1956; 1958	University of Minnesota Law School
23		Walter Mondale	1960–1964	DFL	1960; 1962	University of Minnesota Law School
24		Robert W. Mattson Sr.	1964–1967	DFL		University of Minnesota Law School
25		Douglas M. Head	1967–1971	Republican	1966	University of Minnesota Law School
26		Warren Spannaus	1971–1983	DFL	1970; 1974; 1978	University of Minnesota Law School
27		Skip Humphrey	1983–1999	DFL	1982; 1986; 1990; 1994	University of Minnesota Law School
28		Mike Hatch	1999–2007	DFL	1998; 2002	University of Minnesota Law School
29		Lori Swanson	2007–2019	DFL	2006; 2010; 2014	William Mitchell College of Law
30		Keith Ellison	2019–present	DFL	2018; 2022; 2026	University of Minnesota Law School

- Minnesota Democratic–Farmer–Labor Party: On April 15, 1944, the state Democratic Party and the Minnesota Farmer–Labor Party merged and created the Minnesota Democratic–Farmer–Labor Party (DFL). It is affiliated with the national Democratic Party.

== See also ==
- University of Minnesota Law School
- William Mitchell College of Law
- Attorney General of South Dakota
