= 1865 Minnesota Attorney General election =

- November 7, 1865
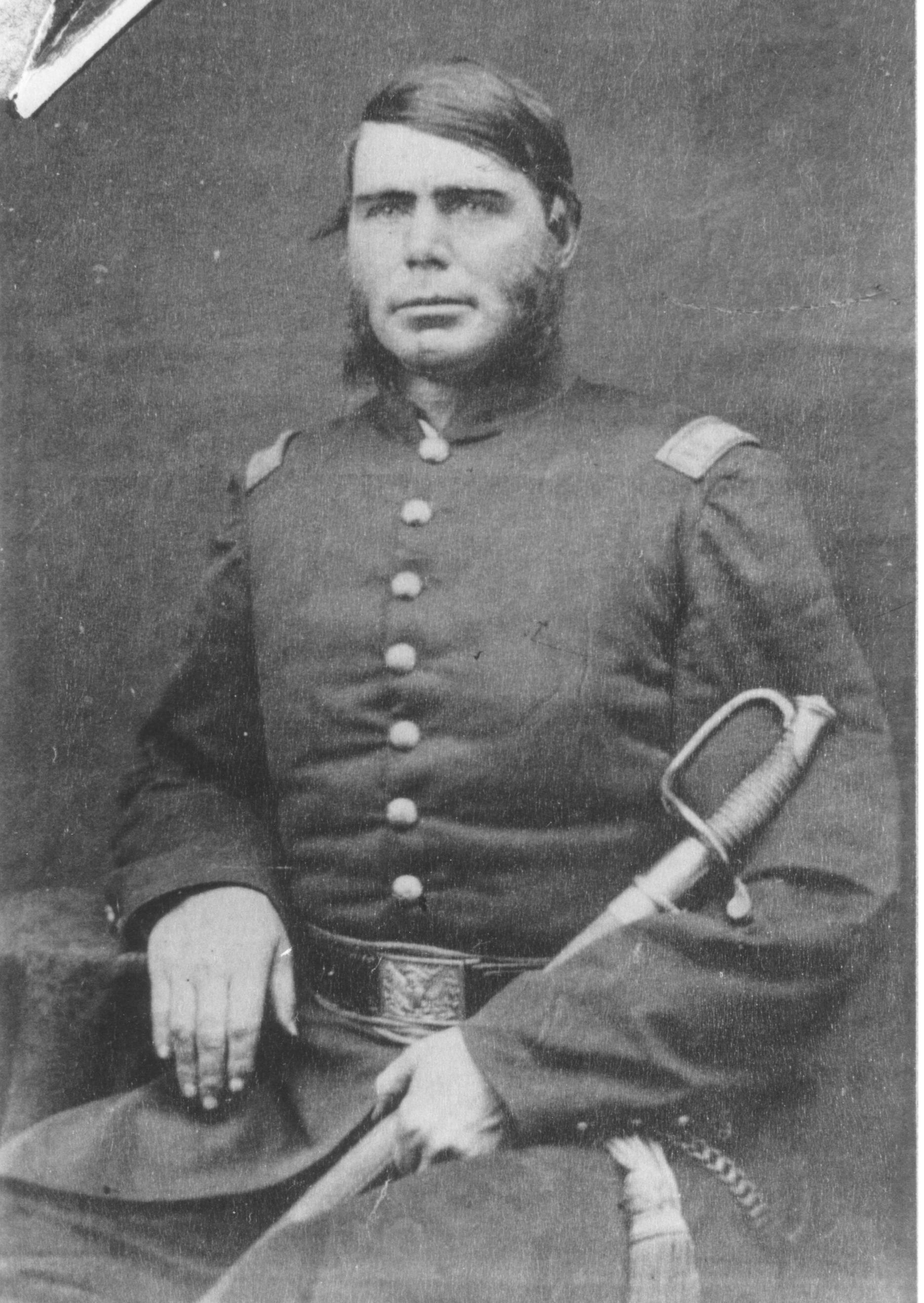

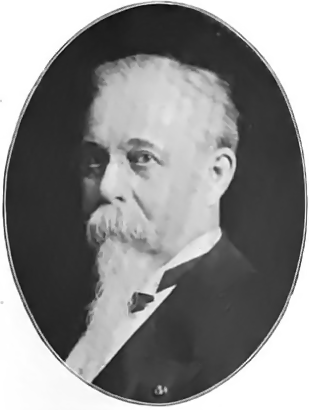
| Nominee | William J. Colvill | William Lochren |
| Party | National Union | Democratic |
| Popular vote | 17,460 | 13,436 |
| Percentage | 56.51% | 43.49% |
Attorney General before election
Gordon E. Cole
Republican
Elected Attorney General
William J. Colvill
National Union

The 1865 Minnesota Attorney General election was held on November 7, 1865, in order to elect the attorney general of Minnesota. National Union nominee and incumbent member of the Minnesota House of Representatives William J. Colvill defeated Democratic nominee William Lochren.

== General election ==
On election day, November 7, 1865, National Union nominee William J. Colvill won the election by a margin of 4,024 votes against his opponent Democratic nominee William Lochren, thereby gaining National Union control over the office of attorney general. Colvill was sworn in as the 3rd attorney general of Minnesota on January 8, 1866.

=== Results ===
Minnesota Attorney General election, 1865
| Party | Candidate | Votes | % |
|---|---|---|---|
| National Union | William J. Colvill | 17,460 | 56.51 |
| Democratic | William Lochren | 13,436 | 43.49 |
| Total votes | | 30,896 | 100.00 |
| National Union gain from Republican | | | |
