= 1956 Minnesota Attorney General election =

- November 6, 1956
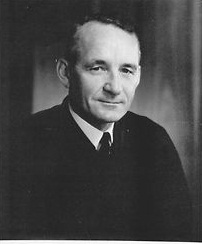

Nominee	Miles Lord	Keith Kennedy
Party	Democratic (DFL)	Republican
Popular vote	694,694	688,931
Percentage	50.21%	49.79%
- County results Lord: 50–60% 60–70% 70–80% Kennedy: 50–60% 60–70%
Attorney General before election
Miles Lord
Democratic (DFL)
Elected Attorney General
Miles Lord
Democratic (DFL)

The 1956 Minnesota Attorney General election was held on November 6, 1956, in order to elect the attorney general of Minnesota. Democratic–Farmer–Labor nominee and incumbent attorney general Miles Lord defeated Republican nominee Keith Kennedy.

== General election ==
On election day, November 6, 1956, Democratic–Farmer–Labor nominee Miles Lord won re-election by a margin of 5,763 votes against his opponent Republican nominee Keith Kennedy, thereby retaining Democratic–Farmer–Labor control over the office of attorney general. Lord was sworn in for his second term on January 7, 1957.

=== Results ===
Minnesota Attorney General election, 1956
Party	Candidate	Votes	%
Democratic (DFL)	Miles Lord (incumbent)	694,694	50.21
Republican	Keith Kennedy	688,931	49.79
Total votes		1,383,625	100.00
Democratic (DFL) hold			
