= 1890 Minnesota Attorney General election =

- November 4, 1890
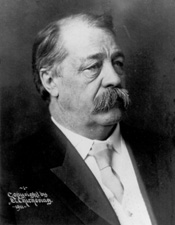

Nominee	Moses E. Clapp	David Calhoun	Robert Taylor
Party	Republican	Democratic	Prohibition
Popular vote	98,187	85,821	55,610
Percentage	40.98%	35.82%	23.20%
Attorney General before election
Moses E. Clapp
Republican
Elected Attorney General
Moses E. Clapp
Republican

The 1890 Minnesota Attorney General election was held on November 4, 1890, in order to elect the attorney general of Minnesota. Republican nominee and incumbent attorney general Moses E. Clapp defeated Democratic nominee David Calhoun and Prohibition nominee Robert Taylor.

== General election ==
On election day, November 4, 1890, Republican nominee Moses E. Clapp won re-election by a margin of 12,366 votes against his foremost opponent Democratic nominee David Calhoun, thereby retaining Republican control over the office of attorney general. Clapp was sworn in for his third term on January 9, 1891.

=== Results ===
Minnesota Attorney General election, 1890
Party	Candidate	Votes	%
Republican	Moses E. Clapp (incumbent)	98,187	40.98
Democratic	David Calhoun	85,821	35.82
Prohibition	Robert Taylor	55,610	23.20
Total votes		239,618	100.00
Republican hold			
