= 1910 Minnesota Attorney General election =

- November 8, 1910
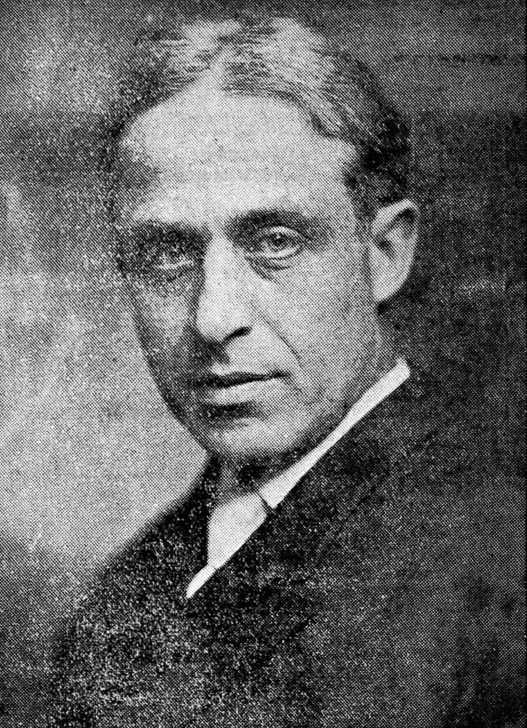

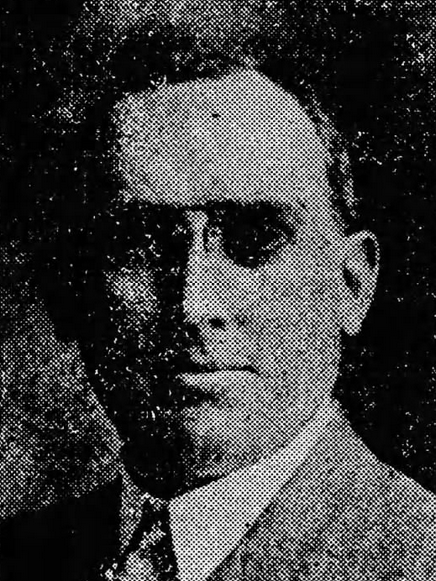
Nominee	George T. Simpson	John M. Freeman
Party	Republican	Democratic
Popular vote	172,257	87,183
Percentage	66.40%	33.60%
Attorney General before election
George T. Simpson
Republican
Elected Attorney General
George T. Simpson
Republican

The 1910 Minnesota Attorney General election was held on November 8, 1910, in order to elect the attorney general of Minnesota. Republican nominee and incumbent attorney general George T. Simpson defeated Democratic nominee John M. Freeman.

== General election ==
On election day, November 8, 1910, Republican nominee George T. Simpson won re-election by a margin of 85,074 votes against his opponent Democratic nominee John M. Freeman, thereby retaining Republican control over the office of attorney general. Simpson was sworn in for his second term on January 4, 1911.

=== Results ===
Minnesota Attorney General election, 1910
Party	Candidate	Votes	%
Republican	George T. Simpson (incumbent)	172,257	66.40
Democratic	John M. Freeman	87,183	33.60
Total votes		259,440	100.00
Republican hold			
