= 1896 Minnesota Attorney General election =

- November 3, 1896
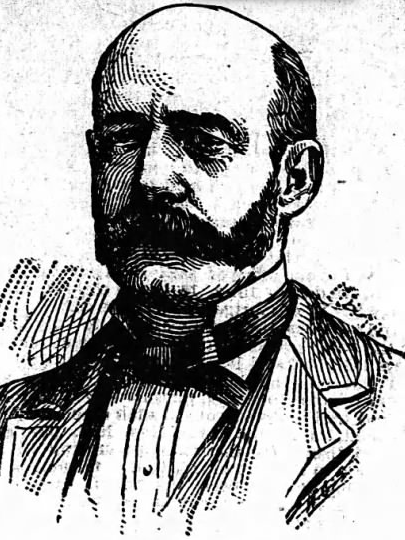

Nominee	Henry W. Childs	John Arnold Keyes
Party	Republican	Democratic
Popular vote	176,273	138,966
Percentage	55.92%	44.08%
Attorney General before election
Henry W. Childs
Republican
Elected Attorney General
Henry W. Childs
Republican

The 1896 Minnesota Attorney General election was held on November 3, 1896, in order to elect the attorney general of Minnesota. Republican nominee and incumbent attorney general Henry W. Childs defeated Democratic nominee John Arnold Keyes.

== General election ==
On election day, November 3, 1896, Republican nominee Henry W. Childs won re-election by a margin of 37,307 votes against his opponent Democratic nominee John Arnold Keyes, thereby retaining Republican control over the office of attorney general. Childs was sworn in for his third term on January 3, 1897.

=== Results ===
Minnesota Attorney General election, 1896
Party	Candidate	Votes	%
Republican	Henry W. Childs (incumbent)	176,273	55.92
Democratic	John Arnold Keyes	138,966	44.08
Total votes		315,239	100.00
Republican hold			
