= 1986 Minnesota Attorney General election =

- November 4, 1986
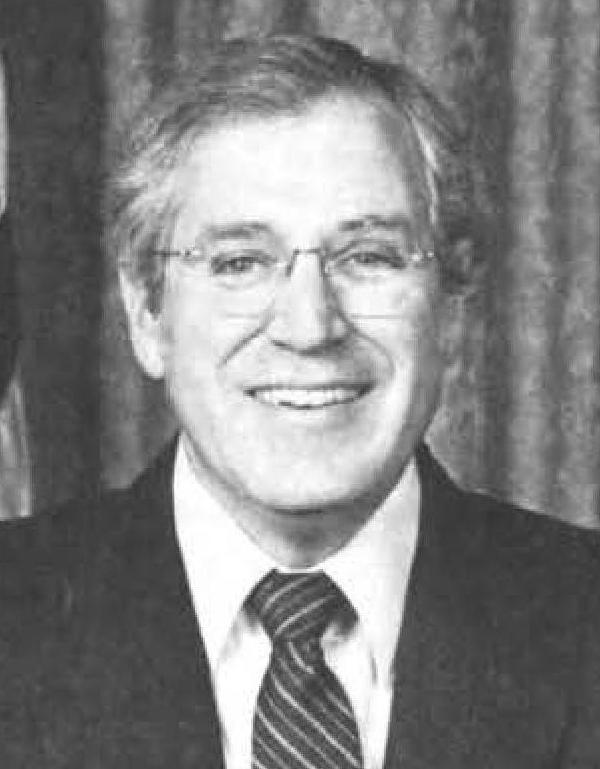

| Nominee | Hubert Humphrey III | Lewis Freeman |
| Party | Democratic (DFL) | Republican |
| Popular vote | 985,569 | 399,483 |
| Percentage | 70.33% | 28.51% |
- County results Humphrey: 50–60% 60–70% 70–80% 80–90%
Attorney General before election
Hubert Humphrey III
Democratic (DFL)
Elected Attorney General
Hubert Humphrey III
Democratic (DFL)

The 1986 Minnesota Attorney General election was held on November 4, 1986, in order to elect the attorney general of Minnesota. Democratic–Farmer–Labor nominee and incumbent attorney general Hubert Humphrey III defeated Republican nominee Lewis Freeman and Grassroots nominee Derrick P. Grimmer.

== General election ==
On election day, November 4, 1986, Democratic–Farmer–Labor nominee Hubert Humphrey III won re-election by a margin of 586,086 votes against his foremost opponent Republican nominee Lewis Freeman, thereby retaining Democratic–Farmer–Labor Party control over the office of attorney general. Humphrey was sworn in for his second term on January 6, 1987.

=== Results ===
Minnesota Attorney General election, 1986
| Party | Candidate | Votes | % |
|---|---|---|---|
| Democratic (DFL) | Hubert Humphrey III | 985,569 | 70.33 |
| Republican | Lewis Freeman | 399,483 | 28.51 |
| Grassroots | Derrick P. Grimmer | 16,394 | 1.16 |
| Total votes | | 1,401,446 | 100.00 |
| Democratic (DFL) hold | | | |
