= 1904 Minnesota Attorney General election =

- November 8, 1904
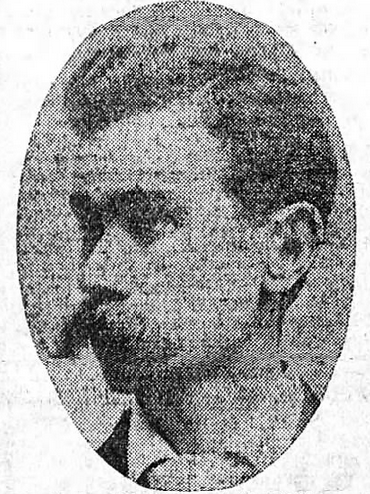

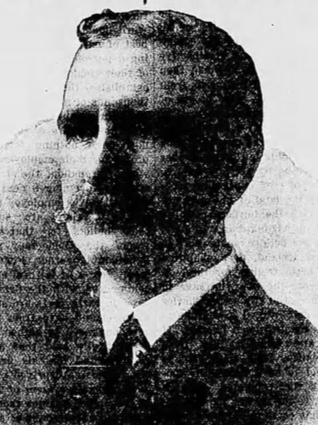
Nominee	Edward T. Young	Thomas McDermott
Party	Republican	Democratic
Popular vote	180,346	87,528
Percentage	67.33%	32.67%
Attorney General before election
William J. Donahower (Acting)
Republican
Elected Attorney General
Edward T. Young
Republican

The 1904 Minnesota Attorney General election was held on November 8, 1904, in order to elect the attorney general of Minnesota. Republican nominee and former member of the Minnesota Senate Edward T. Young defeated Democratic nominee Thomas McDermott.

== General election ==
On election day, November 8, 1904, Republican nominee Edward T. Young won the election by a margin of 92,818 votes against his opponent Democratic nominee Thomas McDermott, thereby retaining Republican control over the office of attorney general. Young was sworn in as the 12th attorney general of Minnesota on January 4, 1905.

=== Results ===
Minnesota Attorney General election, 1904
Party	Candidate	Votes	%
Republican	Edward T. Young	180,346	67.33
Democratic	Thomas McDermott	87,528	32.67
Total votes		267,874	100.00
Republican hold			
