= 1861 Minnesota Attorney General election =

- November 5, 1861
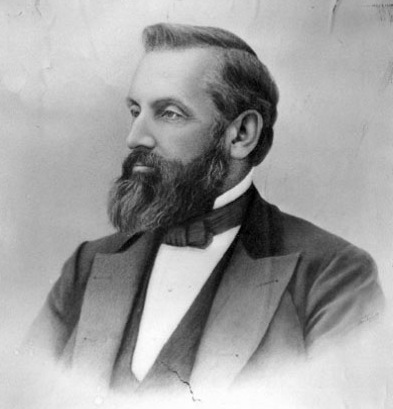

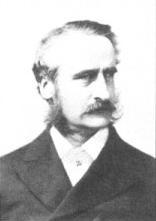
Nominee	Gordon E. Cole	Wheeler Hazard Peckham
Party	Republican	Democratic
Popular vote	16,112	10,533
Percentage	60.64%	39.53%
Attorney General before election
Gordon E. Cole
Republican
Elected Attorney General
Gordon E. Cole
Republican

The 1861 Minnesota Attorney General election was held on November 5, 1861, in order to elect the attorney general of Minnesota. Republican nominee and incumbent Attorney General Gordon E. Cole defeated Democratic nominee Wheeler Hazard Peckham.

== General election ==
On election day, November 5, 1861, Republican nominee Gordon E. Cole won re-election by a margin of 5,579 votes against his opponent Democratic nominee Wheeler Hazard Peckham, thereby retaining Republican control over the office of attorney general. Cole was sworn in for his second term on January 2, 1862.

=== Results ===
Minnesota Attorney General election, 1861
Party	Candidate	Votes	%
Republican	Gordon E. Cole (incumbent)	16,112	60.64
Democratic	Wheeler Hazard Peckham	10,533	39.53
Write-in		3	0.01
Total votes		26,648	100.00
Republican hold			
