= 1863 Minnesota Attorney General election =

- November 3, 1863
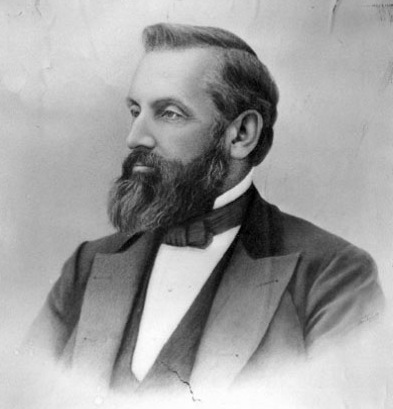

| Nominee | Gordon E. Cole | William H. Grant |
| Party | Republican | Democratic |
| Popular vote | 19,575 | 12,332 |
| Percentage | 61.35% | 38.65% |
Attorney General before election
Gordon E. Cole
Republican
Elected Attorney General
Gordon E. Cole
Republican

The 1863 Minnesota Attorney General election was held on November 3, 1863, in order to elect the attorney general of Minnesota. Republican nominee and incumbent Attorney General Gordon E. Cole defeated Democratic nominee William H. Grant.

== General election ==
On election day, November 3, 1863, Republican nominee Gordon E. Cole won re-election by a margin of 7,243 votes against his opponent Democratic nominee William H. Grant, thereby retaining Republican control over the office of attorney general. Cole was sworn in for his third term on January 11, 1864.

=== Results ===
Minnesota Attorney General election, 1863
| Party | Candidate | Votes | % |
|---|---|---|---|
| Republican | Gordon E. Cole (incumbent) | 19,575 | 61.35 |
| Democratic | William H. Grant | 12,332 | 38.65 |
| Total votes | | 31,907 | 100.00 |
| Republican hold | | | |
