= 1898 Minnesota Attorney General election =

- November 8, 1898
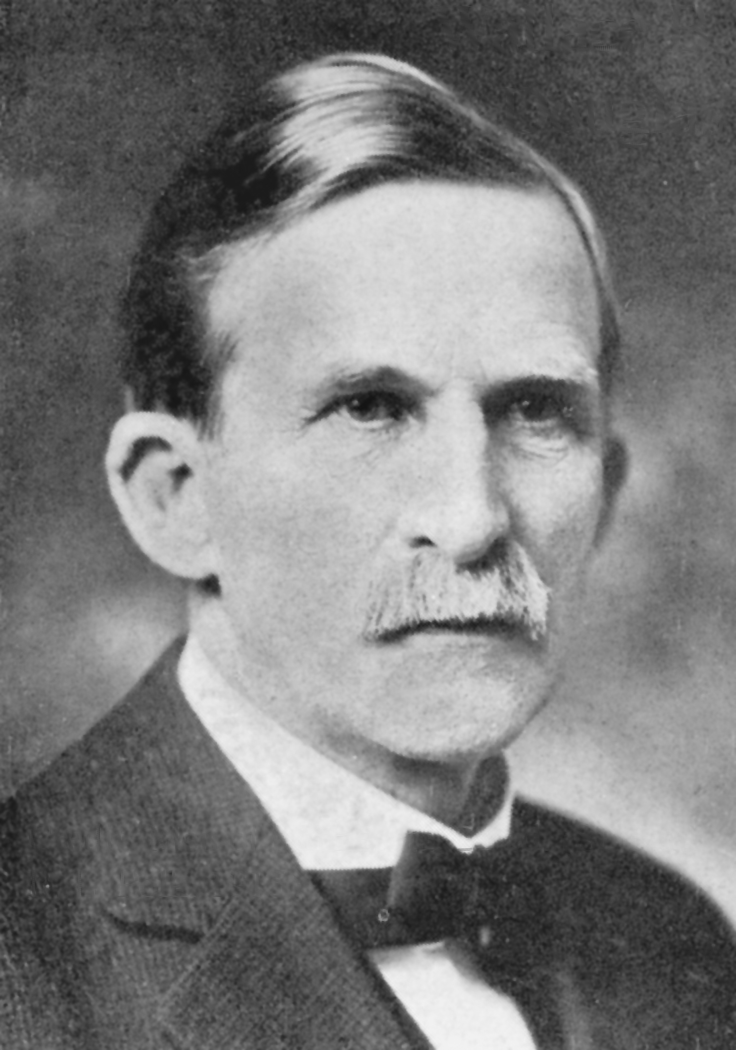

Nominee	Wallace B. Douglas	John F. Kelly
Party	Republican	Democratic
Popular vote	137,505	96,731
Percentage	56.67%	39.87%
Attorney General before election
Henry W. Childs
Republican
Elected Attorney General
Wallace B. Douglas
Republican

The 1898 Minnesota Attorney General election was held on November 8, 1898, in order to elect the attorney general of Minnesota. Republican nominee and incumbent member of the Minnesota House of Representatives Wallace B. Douglas defeated Democratic nominee John F. Kelly and Prohibition nominee Daniel W. Doty.

== General election ==
On election day, November 8, 1898, Republican nominee Wallace B. Douglas won the election by a margin of 40,774 votes against his foremost opponent Democratic nominee John F. Kelly, thereby retaining Republican control over the office of attorney general. Douglas was sworn in as the 10th attorney general of Minnesota on January 3, 1899.

=== Results ===
Minnesota Attorney General election, 1898
Party	Candidate	Votes	%
Republican	Wallace B. Douglas	137,505	56.67
Democratic	John F. Kelly	96,731	39.87
Prohibition	Daniel W. Doty	8,404	3.46
Total votes		242,640	100.00
Republican hold			
