= 1990 Minnesota Attorney General election =

- November 6, 1990
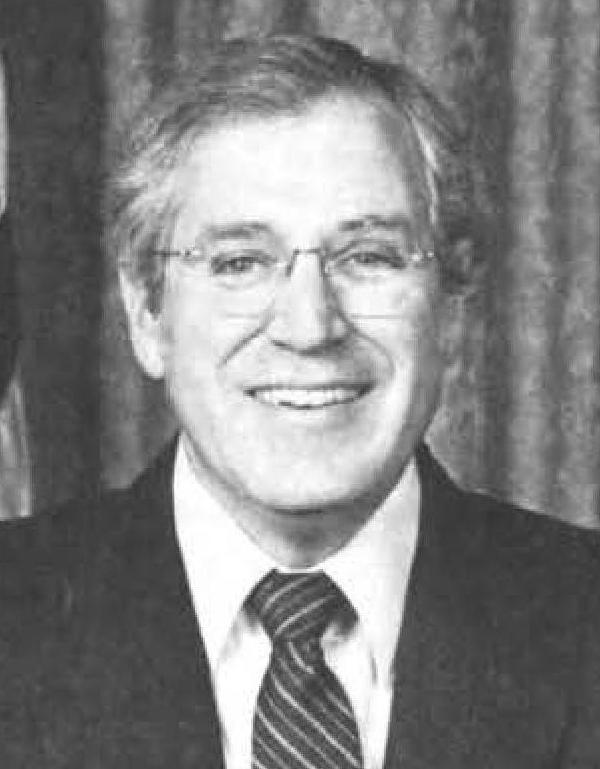

Nominee	Hubert Humphrey III	Kevin E. Johnson
Party	Democratic (DFL)	Republican
Popular vote	1,126,447	655,282
Percentage	63.22%	36.78%
- County results Humphrey: 50–60% 60–70% 70–80%
Attorney General before election
Hubert Humphrey III
Democratic (DFL)
Elected Attorney General
Hubert Humphrey III
Democratic (DFL)

The 1990 Minnesota Attorney General election was held on November 6, 1990, in order to elect the attorney general of Minnesota. Democratic–Farmer–Labor nominee and incumbent attorney general Hubert Humphrey III defeated Republican nominee Kevin E. Johnson.

== General election ==
On election day, November 6, 1990, Democratic–Farmer–Labor nominee Hubert Humphrey III won re-election by a margin of 471,165 votes against his opponent Republican nominee Kevin E. Johnson, thereby retaining Democratic–Farmer–Labor Party control over the office of attorney general. Humphrey was sworn in for his third term on January 3, 1991.

=== Results ===
Minnesota Attorney General election, 1990
Party	Candidate	Votes	%
Democratic (DFL)	Hubert Humphrey III	1,126,447	63.22
Republican	Kevin E. Johnson	655,282	36.78
Total votes		1,781,729	100.00
Democratic (DFL) hold			
