= 1900 Minnesota Attorney General election =

- November 6, 1900
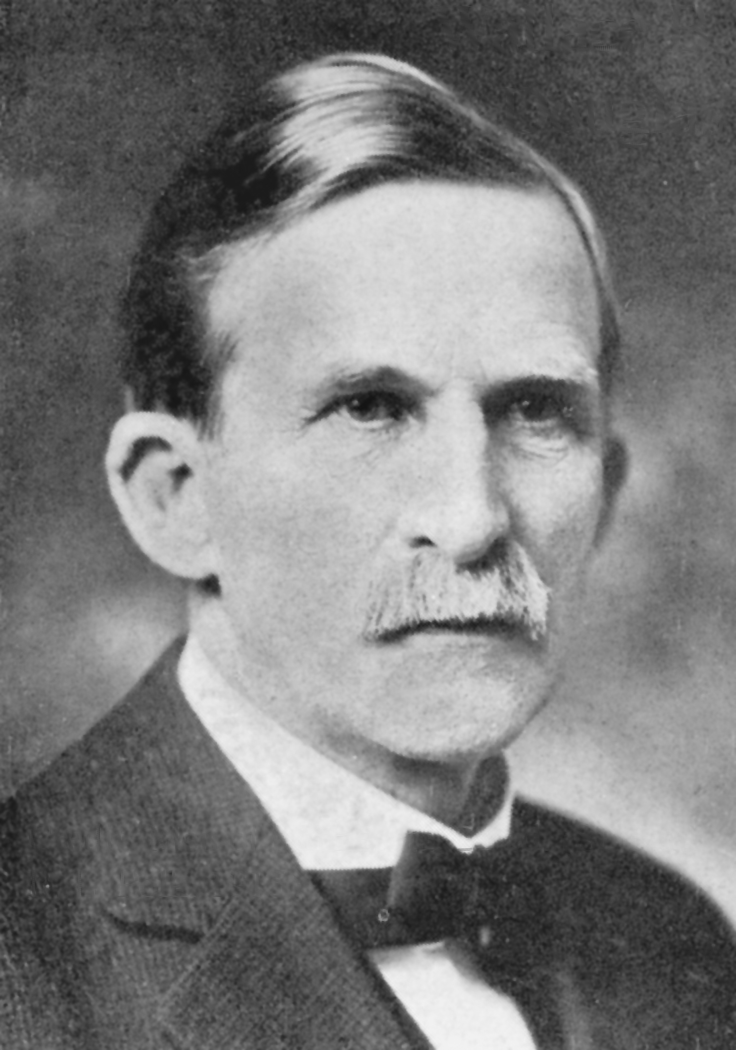

Nominee	Wallace B. Douglas	Robert C. Saunders
Party	Republican	Democratic
Popular vote	180,091	123,446
Percentage	59.33%	40.67%
Attorney General before election
Wallace B. Douglas
Republican
Elected Attorney General
Wallace B. Douglas
Republican

The 1900 Minnesota Attorney General election was held on November 6, 1900, in order to elect the attorney general of Minnesota. Republican nominee and incumbent attorney general Wallace B. Douglas defeated Democratic nominee Robert C. Saunders.

== General election ==
On election day, November 6, 1900, Republican nominee Wallace B. Douglas won re-election by a margin of 56,645 votes against his opponent Democratic nominee Robert C. Saunders, thereby retaining Republican control over the office of attorney general. Douglas was sworn in for his second term on January 7, 1901.

=== Results ===
Minnesota Attorney General election, 1900
Party	Candidate	Votes	%
Republican	Wallace B. Douglas (incumbent)	180,091	59.33
Democratic	Robert C. Saunders	123,446	40.67
Total votes		303,537	100.00
Republican hold			
