= 1958 Minnesota Attorney General election =

- November 4, 1958
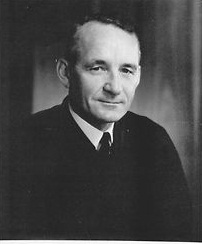

Nominee	Miles Lord	Gaylord A. Saetre
Party	Democratic (DFL)	Republican
Popular vote	627,851	498,478
Percentage	55.74%	44.26%
- County results Lord: 50–60% 60–70% 70–80% Saetre: 50–60% 60–70%
Attorney General before election
Miles Lord
Democratic (DFL)
Elected Attorney General
Miles Lord
Democratic (DFL)

The 1958 Minnesota Attorney General election was held on November 4, 1958, in order to elect the attorney general of Minnesota. Democratic–Farmer–Labor nominee and incumbent attorney general Miles Lord defeated Republican nominee Gaylord A. Saetre.

== General election ==
On election day, November 4, 1958, Democratic–Farmer–Labor nominee Miles Lord won re-election by a margin of 129,373 votes against his opponent Republican nominee Gaylord A. Saetre, thereby retaining Democratic–Farmer–Labor control over the office of attorney general. Lord was sworn in for his third term on January 3, 1959.

=== Results ===
Minnesota Attorney General election, 1958
Party	Candidate	Votes	%
Democratic (DFL)	Miles Lord (incumbent)	627,851	55.74
Republican	Gaylord A. Saetre	498,478	44.26
Total votes		1,126,129	100.00
Democratic (DFL) hold			
