= 1869 Minnesota Attorney General election =

- November 2, 1869
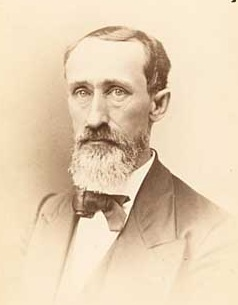

Nominee	Francis R. E. Cornell	Seagrave Smith
Party	Republican	Democratic
Popular vote	29,300	23,812
Percentage	53.80%	43.72%
Attorney General before election
Francis R. E. Cornell
Republican
Elected Attorney General
Francis R. E. Cornell
Republican

The 1869 Minnesota Attorney General election was held on November 2, 1869, in order to elect the attorney general of Minnesota. Republican nominee and incumbent attorney general Francis R. E. Cornell defeated Democratic nominee Seagrave Smith and Temperance nominee James H. Davidson.

== General election ==
On election day, November 2, 1869, Republican nominee Francis R. E. Cornell won re-election by a margin of 5,488 votes against his foremost opponent Democratic nominee Seagrave Smith, thereby retaining Republican control over the office of attorney general. Cornell was sworn in for his second term on January 9, 1870.

=== Results ===
Minnesota Attorney General election, 1869
Party	Candidate	Votes	%
Republican	Francis R. E. Cornell (incumbent)	29,300	53.80
Democratic	Seagrave Smith	23,812	43.72
Prohibition	James H. Davidson	1,348	2.48
Total votes		54,460	100.00
Republican hold			
