= John Lind =

John Lind is the name of:

- John Lind (barrister) (1737–1781), English lawyer and political writer
- John Lind (politician) (1854–1930), US politician
- John Lind (female impersonator) (1877–1940), female impersonator

== See also ==
- Jon Lind, American songwriter
- John Lynde (UK politician), Mayor of Canterbury
- John Lynde (US politician), assemblyman in the 49th New York State Legislature
