= 1952 Minnesota Attorney General election =

- November 4, 1952
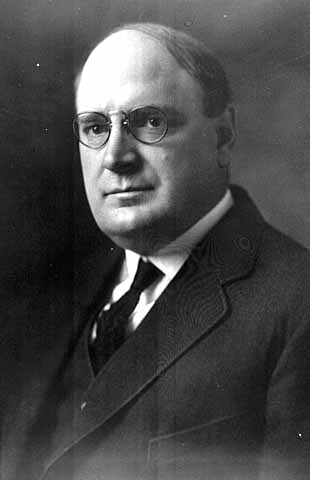

Nominee	Joseph A. A. Burnquist	Allan L. Johnson
Party	Republican	Democratic (DFL)
Popular vote	793,501	560,760
Percentage	58.59%	41.41%
- County results Burnquist: 50-60% 60-70% 70-80% 80-90% Johnson: 50-60%
Attorney General before election
Joseph A. A. Burnquist
Republican
Elected Attorney General
Joseph A. A. Burnquist
Republican

The 1952 Minnesota Attorney General election was held on November 4, 1952, in order to elect the attorney general of Minnesota. Republican nominee and incumbent attorney general Joseph A. A. Burnquist defeated Democratic–Farmer–Labor nominee Allan L. Johnson.

== General election ==
On election day, November 4, 1952, Republican nominee Joseph A. A. Burnquist won re-election by a margin of 232,741 votes against his opponent Democratic–Farmer–Labor nominee Allan L. Johnson, thereby retaining Republican control over the office of attorney general. Burnquist was sworn in for his eighth term on January 5, 1953.

=== Results ===
Minnesota Attorney General election, 1952
Party	Candidate	Votes	%
Republican	Joseph A. A. Burnquist (incumbent)	793,501	58.59
Democratic (DFL)	Allan L. Johnson	560,760	41.41
Total votes		1,354,261	100.00
Republican hold			
