= 1902 Minnesota Attorney General election =

- November 4, 1902
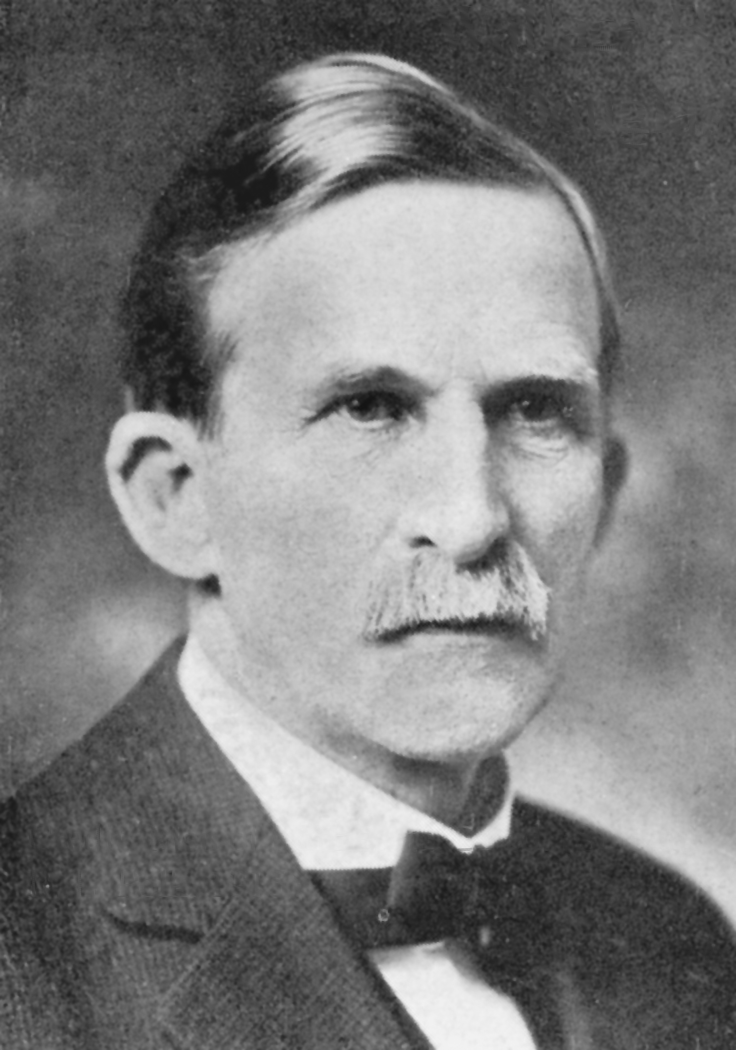

Nominee	Wallace B. Douglas	Frank D. Larrabee
Party	Republican	Democratic
Popular vote	165,744	90,520
Percentage	64.68%	35.32%
Attorney General before election
Wallace B. Douglas
Republican
Elected Attorney General
Wallace B. Douglas
Republican

The 1902 Minnesota Attorney General election was held on November 4, 1902, in order to elect the attorney general of Minnesota. Republican nominee and incumbent attorney general Wallace B. Douglas defeated Democratic nominee Frank D. Larrabee.

== General election ==
On election day, November 4, 1902, Republican nominee Wallace B. Douglas won re-election by a margin of 75,224 votes against his opponent Democratic nominee Frank D. Larrabee, thereby retaining Republican control over the office of attorney general. Douglas was sworn in for his third term on January 7, 1903.

=== Results ===
Minnesota Attorney General election, 1902
Party	Candidate	Votes	%
Republican	Wallace B. Douglas (incumbent)	165,744	64.68
Democratic	Frank D. Larrabee	90,520	35.32
Total votes		256,264	100.00
Republican hold			
