= 1912 Minnesota Attorney General election =

US state officer election

- November 5, 1912
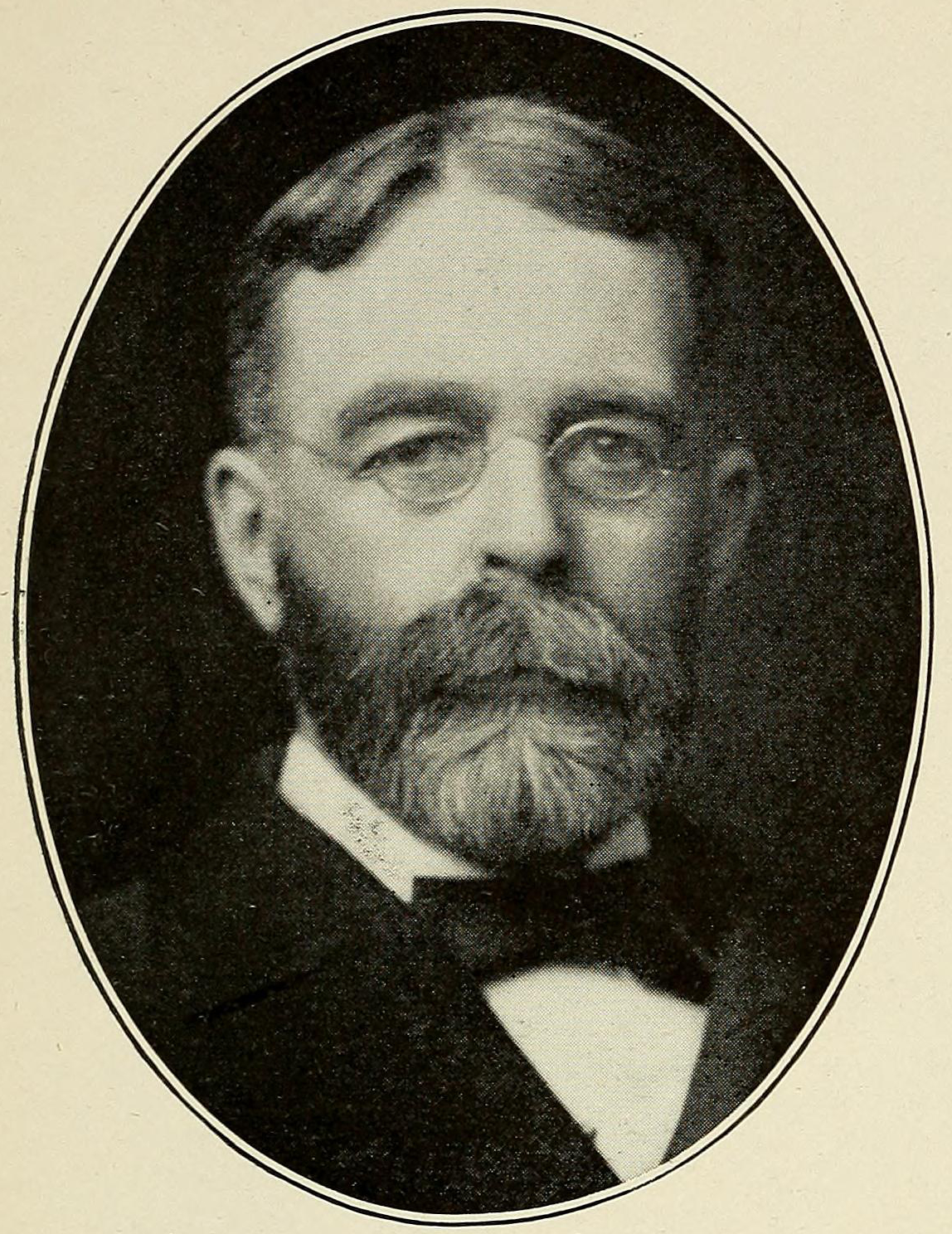

Nominee	Lyndon A. Smith	William F. Donohue	J.H. Morse
Party	Republican	Democratic	Prohibition
Popular vote	166,950	83,997	27,140
Percentage	60.04%	30.21%	9.75%
Attorney General before election
Lyndon A. Smith (Acting)
Republican
Elected Attorney General
Lyndon A. Smith
Republican

The 1912 Minnesota Attorney General election was held on November 5, 1912, in order to elect the attorney general of Minnesota. Republican nominee and incumbent acting attorney general Lyndon A. Smith defeated Democratic nominee William F. Donohue and Prohibition nominee J.H. Morse.

== General election ==
On election day, November 5, 1912, Republican nominee Lyndon A. Smith won the election by a margin of 82,953 votes against his foremost opponent Democratic nominee William F. Donohue, thereby retaining Republican control over the office of attorney general. Smith was sworn in for his first full term on January 3, 1913.

=== Results ===
Minnesota Attorney General election, 1912
Party	Candidate	Votes	%
Republican	Lyndon A. Smith (incumbent)	166,950	60.04
Democratic	William F. Donohue	83,997	30.21
Prohibition	J.H. Morse	27,140	9.75
Total votes		278,087	100.00
Republican hold			
