= 1871 Minnesota Attorney General election =

- November 7, 1871
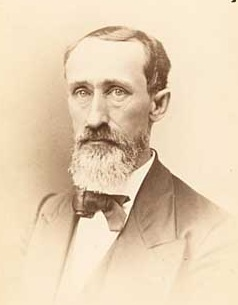

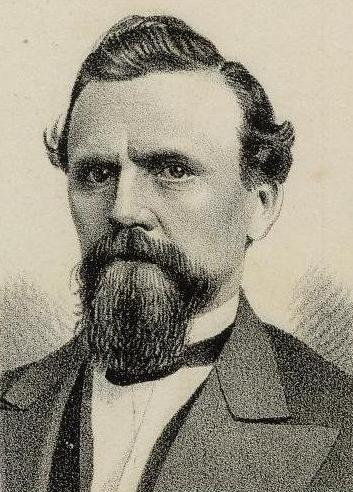
Nominee	Francis R. E. Cornell	John L. MacDonald
Party	Republican	Democratic
Popular vote	46,560	30,233
Percentage	60.53%	39.30%
Attorney General before election
Francis R. E. Cornell
Republican
Elected Attorney General
Francis R. E. Cornell
Republican

The 1871 Minnesota Attorney General election was held on November 7, 1871, in order to elect the attorney general of Minnesota. Republican nominee and incumbent attorney general Francis R. E. Cornell defeated Democratic nominee and incumbent ember of the Minnesota Senate from the 18th district John L. MacDonald and Temperance nominee Uzzel F. Sargent.

== General election ==
On election day, November 7, 1871, Republican nominee Francis R. E. Cornell won re-election by a margin of 16,327 votes against his foremost opponent Democratic nominee John L. MacDonald, thereby retaining Republican control over the office of attorney general. Cornell was sworn in for his third term on January 9, 1872.

=== Results ===
Minnesota Attorney General election, 1871
Party	Candidate	Votes	%
Republican	Francis R. E. Cornell (incumbent)	46,560	60.53
Democratic	John L. MacDonald	30,233	39.30
Prohibition	Uzzel F. Sargent	131	0.17
Total votes		76,924	100.00
Republican hold			
