= 1914 Minnesota Attorney General election =

- November 3, 1914
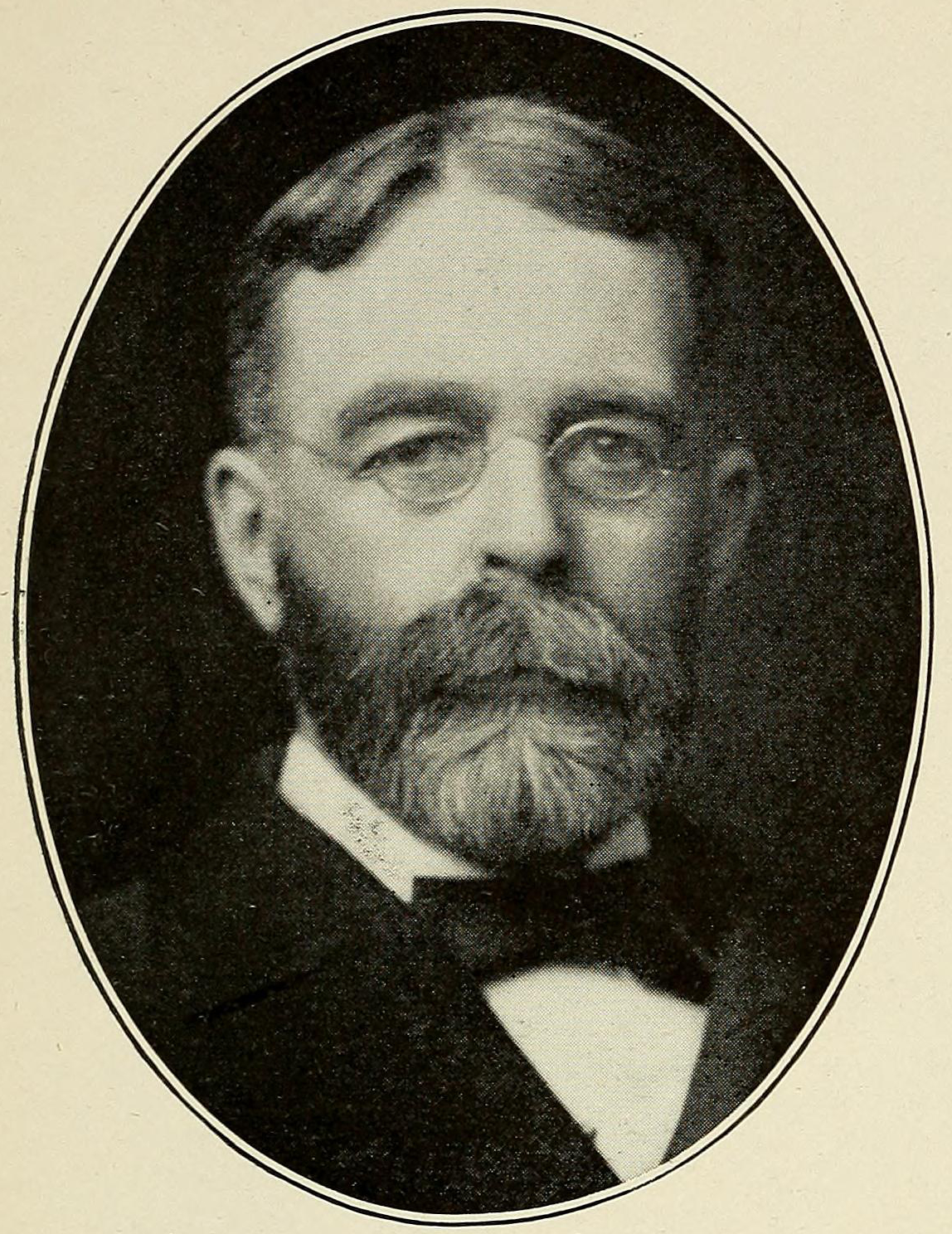

Nominee	Lyndon A. Smith	William F. Donohue	August V. Rieke
Party	Republican	Democratic	Progressive
Popular vote	195,372	94,025	16,736
Percentage	63.82%	30.71%	5.47%
Attorney General before election
Lyndon A. Smith
Republican
Elected Attorney General
Lyndon A. Smith
Republican

The 1914 Minnesota Attorney General election was held on November 3, 1914, in order to elect the attorney general of Minnesota. Republican nominee and incumbent attorney general Lyndon A. Smith defeated Democratic nominee Neil Cronin and Progressive nominee and former member of the Minnesota Senate August V. Rieke.

== General election ==
On election day, November 3, 1914, Republican nominee Lyndon A. Smith won re-election by a margin of 101,347 votes against his foremost opponent Democratic nominee Neil Cronin, thereby retaining Republican control over the office of attorney general. Smith was sworn in for his second full term on January 3, 1915.

=== Results ===
Minnesota Attorney General election, 1914
Party	Candidate	Votes	%
Republican	Lyndon A. Smith (incumbent)	195,372	63.82
Democratic	Neil Cronin	94,025	30.71
Progressive	August V. Rieke	16,736	5.47
Total votes		306,131	100.00
Republican hold			
