= 1867 Minnesota Attorney General election =

- November 5, 1867
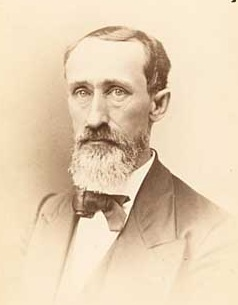

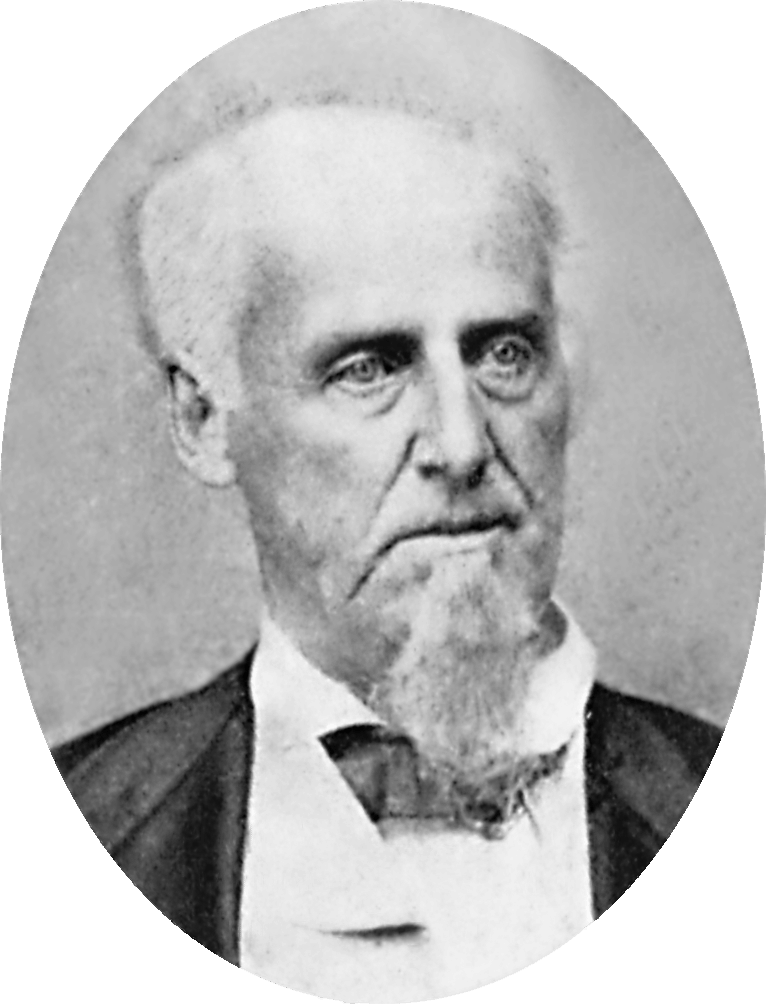
Nominee	Francis R. E. Cornell	Andrew G. Chatfield
Party	Republican	Democratic
Popular vote	34,657	28,918
Percentage	53.84%	44.92%
Attorney General before election
William J. Colvill
National Union
Elected Attorney General
Francis R. E. Cornell
Republican

The 1867 Minnesota Attorney General election was held on November 5, 1867, in order to elect the attorney general of Minnesota. Republican nominee and former member of the Minnesota House of Representatives Francis R. E. Cornell defeated Democratic nominee and former Justice of the Supreme Court of Minnesota Territory Andrew G. Chatfield.

== General election ==
On election day, November 5, 1867, Republican nominee Francis R. E. Cornell won the election by a margin of 5,739 votes against his opponent Democratic nominee Andrew G. Chatfield, thereby gaining Republican control over the office of attorney general. Cornell was sworn in as the 4th attorney general of Minnesota on January 8, 1868.

=== Results ===
Minnesota Attorney General election, 1867
Party	Candidate	Votes	%
Republican	Francis R. E. Cornell	34,657	53.84
Democratic	Andrew G. Chatfield	28,918	44.92
Write-in		801	1.24
Total votes		64,376	100.00
Republican gain from National Union			
