= John Lind (female impersonator) =

Swedish female impersonator (1877–1940)

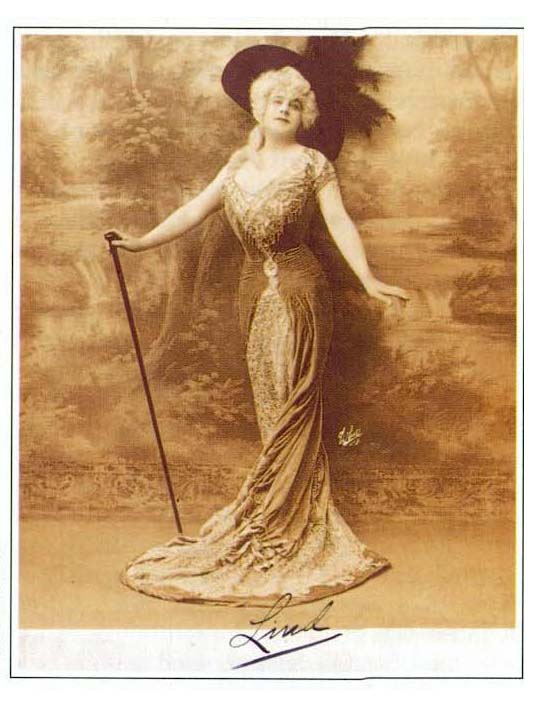
- Born: 17 January 1877
- Died: 3 February 1940 (aged 63); Karlskrona city community

John Lind (1877–1940), born with the surname Lindström, was a Swedish female impersonator, singer and dancer. Although mostly forgotten today, he toured the world in the early 20th century and was one of Sweden's most internationally famed artists.

== Early life ==
John Lindström was born in the small town Vissefjärda, but grew up in Karlskrona. The local director of theatre, Hildur Carlsberg, helped the young Lind get a place at the Alhambra variety theatre in Stockholm. At the age of 18 he performed as a ballet dancer dressed as a woman, and was a celebrated member receiving a lot of attention from an audience who in large consisted of sailors from the nearby Skeppsholmen flotilla.

== International career ==
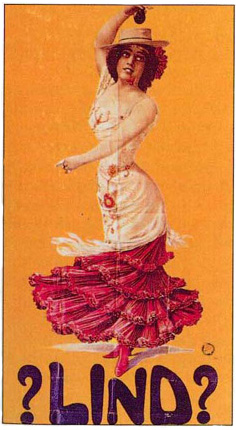
A poster from the ?Lind? tour

John Lindström changed his surname to Lind, most likely as a reference to the celebrated Jenny Lind. Together with a female partner he toured under the name of Fanny och John Lind (Fanny and John Lind). After touring Finland and Russia he moved on to Hamburg and started up the group Les Petits Filous together with Paul Schneider-Duncker, where Lind danced and sang soprano. He was discovered by an English impresario during a 1902 Paris performance, and in 1904 he became a star at the London Pavilion under the name of Lind?.

Lind toured the world with ?Lind? for over 20 years. He performed at stages in Europe, the US, South America and Africa. But he only performed once in Sweden, where female impersonators were not quite well considered at the time. During a tour in the US 1907 he met his future wife, the Russian Stepha Klein (1882–1973), who would also become his impresario and dresser.

?Lind? was a large and costly show that John Lind performed acts based on subjects like "the five senses", played the roles of historical female figures or made pastiches on contemporary dancers like Anna Pavlova, Cléo de Mérode, La Belle Otero and Isadora Duncan.

John Lind moved back to Karlskrona in 1923. Touring had worn him out, and while he remained a member of artists societies like the American The White Rats, he would not return to the stage again.

== Death and legacy ==
John Lind died in 1940 after a time of sickness and relative obscurity. He suffered from diabetes and had lost most of his money in the Kreuger Crash. His wife Stepha Lind stayed in Karlskrona until she died in 1973, when all of Lind's show materials, posters and outfits were donated to Blekinge Läns Museum. The museum displayed an exhibit over Lind that same year.

In Sweden today John Lind is still a largely unknown figure. He remains a larger figure on the international scene, spoken of as a precursor by Danny La Rue and a part in the history of female impersonation and drag queens.

== References and further reading ==
- A biography of John Lind (in Swedish)
- Baker, Roger et al. Drag: A History of Female Impersonation in the Performing Arts. ISBN 0-8147-1253-3
- https://web.archive.org/web/20140724040738/http://www.blekingemuseum.se/lind/index.htm (in Swedish)
- John Lind- karlskronapojken som vann världsrykte. ISBN 91-973042-9-8

Specific
