= Charles d'Autremont =

American politician

Charles E. d'Autremont
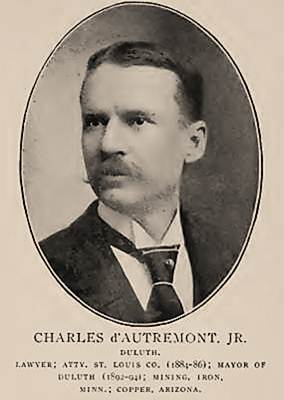
- d'Autremont from Men of Minnesota
- Born: June 2, 1855; Angelica, New York
- Died: July 25, 1919 (aged 64); Angelica, New York
- Education: Columbia University, 1875, Cornell University, 1869-1871
- Occupations: Lawyer and politician

Charles E. d'Autremont, Jr. (June 2, 1855 – July 25, 1919) was a mayor of Duluth, Minnesota. He was an attorney by profession, active in the Democratic Party, and pursued the exploitation of copper and iron mineral resources.

== Early life and education ==
d'Autremont was born in Angelica, New York, where his father, Charles E., Sr., was a banker and merchant. d'Autremont continued in his father's trade. The d'Autremont family, some of whose members had fallen victim to the Reign of Terror, immigrated to New York in 1792. Among the family wares were grindstones, shipped to Geneva, New York for sale, as well as the processing of wolf pelts as a part of the New York State bounty on the predator. He also traded stocks in New York City and invested in western real estate. In 1848, Charles E., Sr., traveled the Continent – notably the Republic of France – arriving in Paris during the Revolutions of that year. Sarah (Collins) d'Autremont, spouse to Charles E., Sr., was an abolitionist. She was the daughter of Judge John Collins, Jr., who also served as an officer in the New York militia in the War of 1812.

Charles E. d'Autremont, Jr., prepared at the Angelica Academy, matriculated at Cornell University (1868) for Academic Years 1868–69, 1869–70 and 1870–71. He took ill and moved to Lausanne, Switzerland to study in a place more favorable to his recovery than Ithaca, New York. In 1872, d'Autremont returned to the United States to study law. He first read the law with his uncle, John G. Collins, at Angelica, N.Y. He then attended Columbia Law School, from which he received his LL.B. (1875). d'Autremont then spent the summer of 1875 travelling in Europe; and he returned in 1879. During the fall of 1875, he decided to settle in Elmira, New York, where he practiced law as an associate attorney in his future father-in-law's firm, Hart & McGuire. He was elected to Chemung County Board of Supervisors. In 1878, he returned to the family's homestead and hung his shingle to practice law at Angelica. During the professional years on New York's southern tier (1875–1882), d'Autremont campaigned actively for Horace Greeley in 1872, Samuel Tilden in 1876, and Winfield Scott Hancock in 1880. He was president of Elmira's Tilden and Hancock Clubs and gave stump speeches throughout New York and Pennsylvania. He moved to Duluth, Minnesota, in 1882.

== The Minnesota years ==
The removal to Duluth was happenstance. d'Autremont travelled east from a hunting trip on the Little Missouri River and missed the eastbound steamer at Duluth. Waiting several days for the next boat, he decided Duluth had opportunities lacking at home. Reaching Angelica, he packed up his belongings and returned with his family. d'Autremont was elected Saint Louis County attorney in 1884 and ran for Attorney General of the State of Minnesota in 1888. He was defeated. d'Autremont's western law practice focused on federal land grant law, with several notable appeals being decided by the U.S. Supreme Court. He also championed state laws against gambling and banning the sale of liquor on Sunday.

In 1892 he was elected Mayor of Duluth. One of his most pressing concerns as mayor was relieving the effects of the Panic of 1893, which laid off hundreds of mine workers who, having no work, then moved into Duluth. In 1896 and 1902, d'Autremont served as Democratic elector for the State of Minnesota. After 1902, he served on the Democratic State Central Committee and its executive committee. His financial contribution to the campaign of William Jennings Bryan was double the party member's average for the 1908 presidential campaign.

In 1892, d'Autremont surveyed the historic Mesaba range for iron ore. He and James Sheridan staked claims that became the great Sheridan, d'Autremont and Foster mines. In 1900, d'Autremont moved into copper ore exploitation. He organized, in part, the Lake Superior and Western Development Company, later the subject of a takeover by the Arizona and Calumet Mining Company. Having focused on the copper and iron mining industries, he was eventually president of the Angelica Mining Company, of Wicks, Montana, and a director of the Calumet and Arizona Mining Company. At their peak, his mining interests stretched from British Columbia through the United States and into the Republic of Mexico.

== Family life ==
d'Autremont's spouse was Harriet "Hattie" Hart, dau. of Erastus Parmalee Hart of Elmira, New York. They were married in Elmira on April 21, 1880. Charles and Hattie had five children: Antoinette (b. July 10, 1881 Angelica, N.Y. – d. 1958) spouse to Oliver S. Andresen of Duluth, Minn.; Louis Paul (b. Aug. 23, 1883, Duluth, Minn.); Charles Maurice (b. Aug. 6, 1887 Tucson, AZ – d. Dec. 6, 1964 California) married Alice and had no children; Hubert Hart (b. Feb. 19, 1889, Duluth, Minn. – d. Apr. 15, 1947) married Helen Clara Congdon and had 4 children; and Marie Genevieve (b. March 9, 1892, Duluth, Minn. – d. Jun. 8, 1990), spouse to Alexander Le Roy Gerry of Hibbling, Minn., and had 3 children.

== Death ==
d'Autremont returned from the West to the family homeplace at Angelica, N.Y. and convalesced in Cuba, New York, near Angelica. From 1917 to 1919, his health declined and he died in Angelica, N.Y.

== Associations ==
d'Autremont was a member of Duluth's Commercial Club, the Kitchi Gammi Club, The Boat Club, The Yacht Club, The Curling Club, and the Northland Country Club. He initiated into both the Phi Kappa Psi and Psi Upsilon fraternities at Cornell University, when the local chapter of the former was changing affiliations between national organizations. At Phi Kappa Psi, he was a member along with, among others, federal Judge Franklin Ferriss and U.S. Senator Carl Schurz (R-Wis.). He was also a member of the Irving Literary Society. When living in Elmira, New York, he was a member of St. Omar's Commandery and the Century Club. Charles' sons Hubert Hart and Charles Maurice d'Autremont were Cornell graduates and members of Phi Kappa Psi and the Irving Literary Society, both joining with professor and Progressive Alfred Hayes, Jr.
