= Charles H. Berry =

American politician

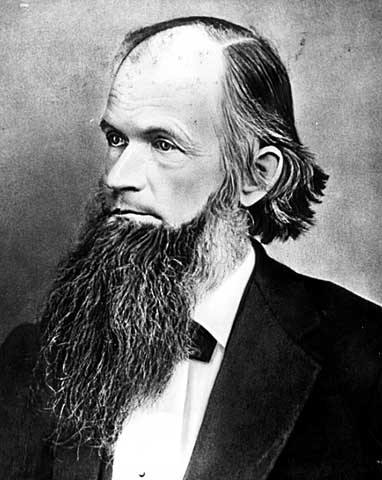

Associate Justice of the Idaho Territorial Supreme Court
- In office July 19, 1888 – October 1890
- Appointed by: Grover Cleveland
- Preceded by: Case Broderick
- Succeeded by: position abolished

Member of the Minnesota Senate from the 8th district
- In office January 6, 1874 – January 3, 1876
- Preceded by: William H. Stevens
- Succeeded by: William Hall Yale

1st Minnesota Attorney General
- In office May 24, 1858 – January 1860
- Governor: Henry H. Sibley
- Preceded by: position established
- Succeeded by: Gordon E. Cole

Personal details
- Born: September 12, 1823 Westerly, Rhode Island, U.S.
- Died: August 21, 1900 (aged 76) Winona, Minnesota, U.S.
- Party: Democratic
- Spouse: Frances Eliza Hubbell (m. 1850)
- Children: 1
- Parents: Samuel Foster Berry (father); Lucy Stanton (mother)
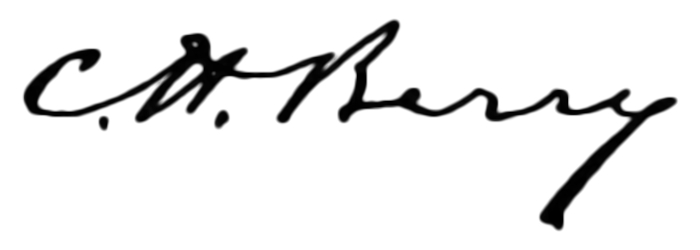
- Signature

Charles Henry Berry (September 12, 1823 – August 21, 1900), widely known as C. H. Berry, was an American politician and jurist who served as the first Minnesota Attorney General after statehood and as one of the last justices of the Idaho Territorial Supreme Court.

== Biography ==
Berry was born in Westerly, Rhode Island, the son of Samuel Foster and Lucy (née Stanton) Berry. He moved to Caton, New York, at the age of four, then to Maine, New York in 1838 to attend an academy. He attended Canandaigua Academy from 1843 to 1846, then studied law under Elbridge G. Lapham and was admitted to the bar in 1848. He then practiced law in Corning, New York, until 1855. He married Frances Eliza Hubbell in Corning in 1850, and they would have one daughter.

He moved to Winona, Minnesota Territory, in 1855. In 1857, he was elected as a Democrat as Minnesota's first state attorney general, and served from May 24, 1858, to January 1860. He also served in the Minnesota Senate from 1874 to 1876. He was instrumental in the establishment of Winona State Normal School, and served as its resident director from 1885 to 1887.

On July 9, 1888, President Grover Cleveland nominated Berry to be Associate Justice of the Idaho Territorial Supreme Court, and he was confirmed by the senate ten days later. Following Idaho's statehood, per the Idaho Constitution, he remained in office until the state's supreme court justices were elected in October 1890.

He died in Winona on August 21, 1900.

== Notes ==
Legal offices
| Preceded by LaFayette Emmett | Minnesota Attorney General; 1858–1860 | Succeeded by Gordon E. Cole |
