= Edward T. Young =

American politician (1858–1940)

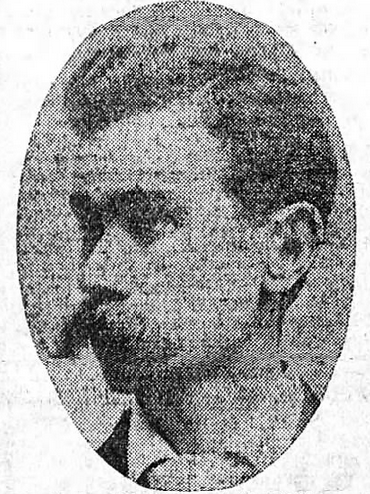

12th Minnesota Attorney General
- In office January 2, 1905 – January 4, 1909
- Governor: John Albert Johnson
- Preceded by: William J. Donahower
- Succeeded by: George T. Simpson

Member of the Minnesota Senate
- In office January 7, 1895 – January 4, 1903
- Governor: David Marston Clough; John Lind; Samuel Rinnah Van Sant

Member of the Minnesota House of Representatives
- In office January 2, 1893 – January 6, 1895
- In office January 7, 1889 – January 4, 1891
- Governor: William Rush Merriam; Knute Nelson

Personal details
- Born: October 27, 1858 Henderson, Minnesota, U.S.
- Died: September 19, 1940 (aged 81) Glendale, California, U.S.
- Resting place: Forest Lawn Memorial Park
- Other political affiliations: Republican

Edward T. Young (October 27, 1858 – September 19, 1940) was an American lawyer and politician.

Young was born in Henderson, Minnesota. He received his law degree from the University of Minnesota and was admitted to the Minnesota bar in 1881. Young practiced law in Appleton, Minnesota and served as the Appleton City Attorney. He also served on the Appleton City Council and was a Republican. Young served in the Minnesota House of Representatives in 1889 and 1890 and in 1893 and 1894. Young also served in the Minnesota Senate from 1895 to 1902. Young served as the Minnesota Attorney General from 1905 to 1909. In that capacity, he was the petitioner in Ex parte Young, the 1909 Supreme Court case about states' sovereign immunity. In 1908, he was a candidate for the Republican nominee for governor of Minnesota, but lost to Jacob F. Jacobson.
