= George P. Wilson =

American politician

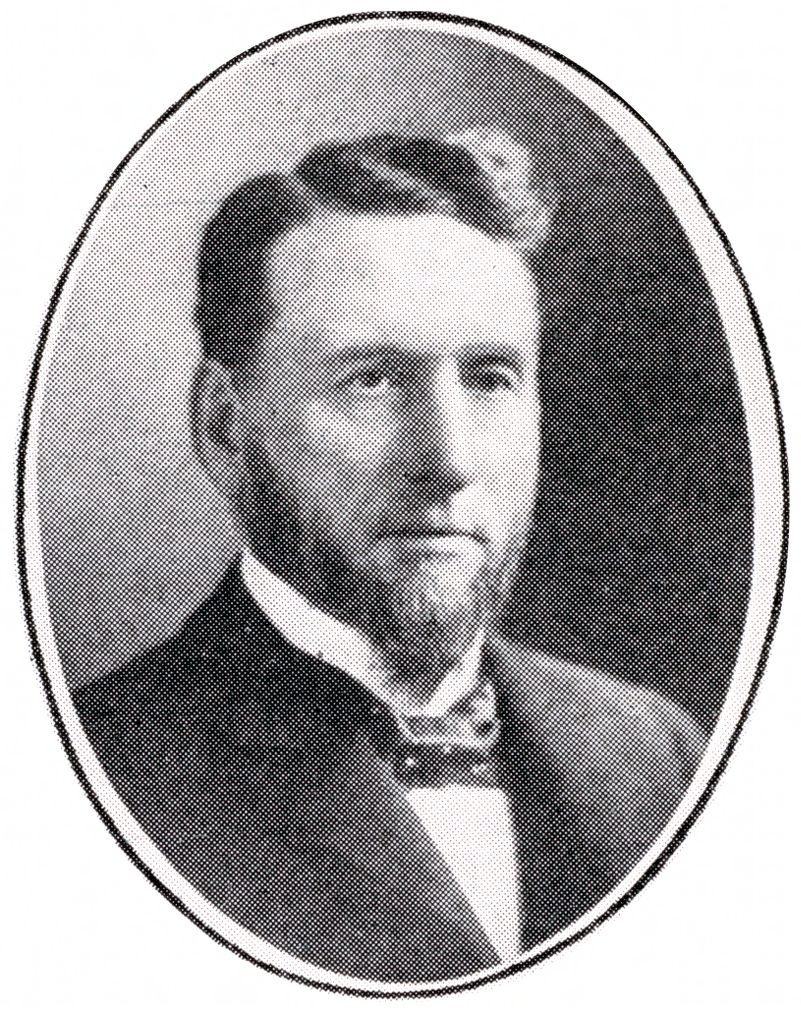
- Wilson c.1907-1908

5th Minnesota Attorney General
- In office 1874–1880
- Preceded by: Francis R. E. Cornell
- Succeeded by: Charles M. Start

Member of the Minnesota Legislature
- In office 1899 - 1914

Personal details
- Born: George Potter Wilson; January 14, 1840 Lewisburg, Pennsylvania, U.S.
- Died: January 20, 1920 (aged 80) Hennepin County, Minnesota
- Resting place: Lakewood Cemetery, Minneapolis, Minnesota, U.S.
- Other political affiliations: Republican
- Spouse: Mary Adelaide "Ada" Harrington
- Children: 4
- Education: Bucknell University; Ohio Wesleyan University

George Potter Wilson (January 19, 1840 – January 20, 1920) was an American lawyer and politician.

== Early life ==
Wilson was born in Lewisburg, Pennsylvania on January 14, 1840. He studied at Bucknell University and Ohio Wesleyan University before moving to Winona, Minnesota in 1860. He read law in the offices of Lewis & Simpson and William B. Mitchell, a former justice of the Minnesota Supreme Court, before being admitted to the bar at Rochester in October 1862.

== Political career ==
Wilson served as assistant secretary of the Minnesota Senate from 1854 to 1855 and as secretary from 1856 to 1857. He served as county attorney for Winona 1865 to 1871. In 1871 Wilson was appointed a United States commissioner on the Southern Pacific Railroad. Wilson served as the member of the Minnesota House of Representatives from the 8th District in 1873.

Wilson served three two-year terms as Minnesota Attorney General, serving from January 9, 1874, to January 10, 1880. In 1898 Wilson was elected to the Minnesota Senate from the 41st district. He was reelected in 1902.

A Republican, Wilson was a member of the Methodist Episcopal Church and a Freemason. He was married September 26, 1866, to Ade H. Harrington, a daughter of William H. and Miranda Harrington, who were among the early settlers of Winona. Wilson had three children: Jessie M., later married to William R. Sweatt of Minneapolis, Walter H., and Wilt Wilson.

Legal offices
Preceded by Francis R. E. Cornell	Minnesota Attorney General; 1874–1880	Succeeded by Charles M. Start
