= William John Hahn =

American lawyer

William J. Hahn
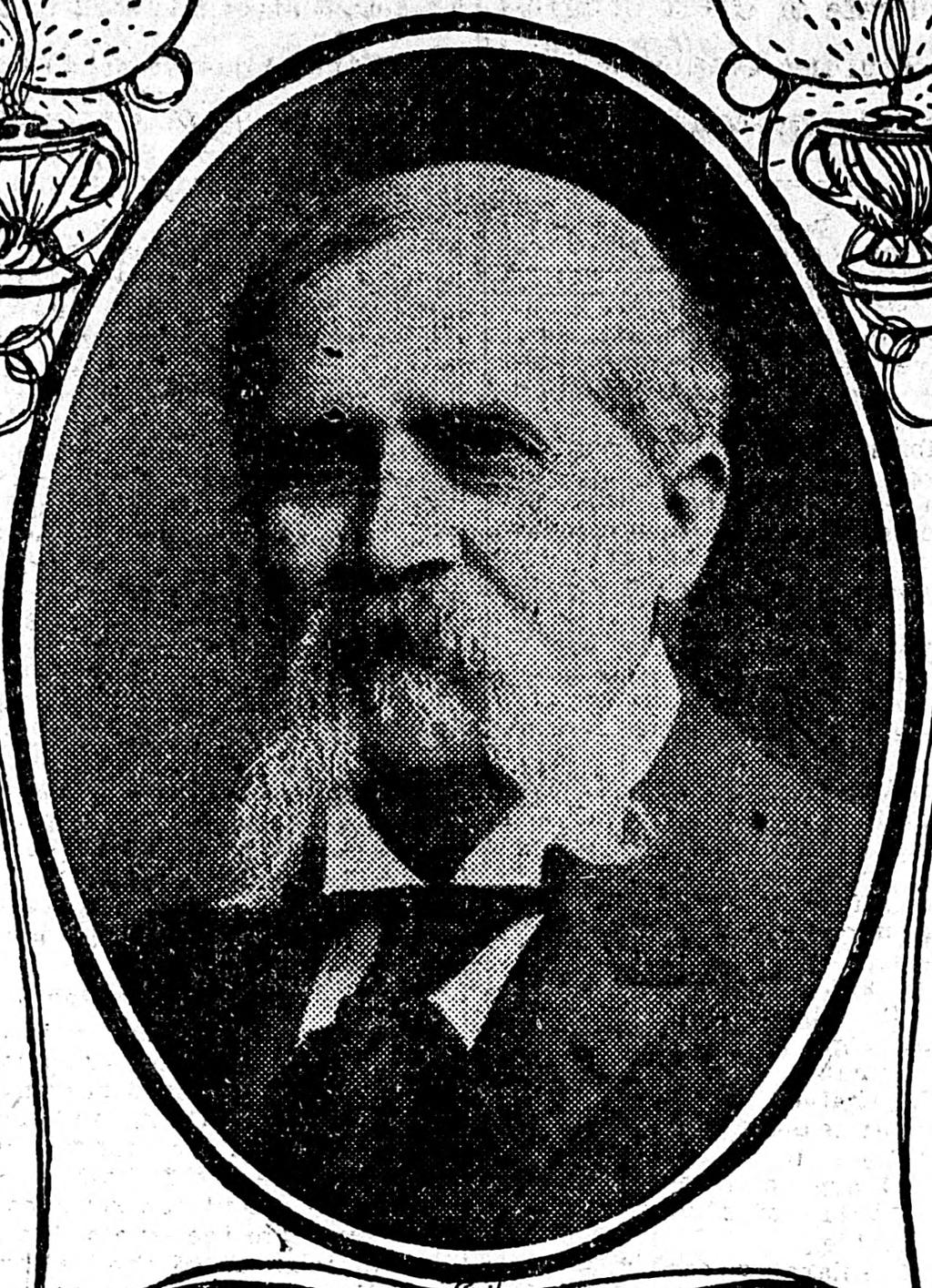
- Hahn c.1902

7th Minnesota Attorney General
- In office 1881–1887
- Governor: John S. Pillsbury; Lucius Frederick Hubbard
- Preceded by: Charles M. Start
- Succeeded by: Moses E. Clapp

Personal details
- Born: William John Hahn; November 5, 1841 Mifflin County, Pennsylvania
- Died: September 23, 1902 (aged 60) Minneapolis, Minnesota, U.S.
- Resting place: Lakewood Cemetery; Minneapolis, Minnesota, U.S.
- Other political affiliations: Republican
- Domestic partner: 2
- Children: 5
- Occupation: Lawyer county attorney politician

William John Hahn (November 5, 1841 – September 23, 1902) was an American lawyer and politician from Minnesota who served as the seventh Minnesota Attorney General from 1881 to 1887.

== Biography ==
Hahn was born in Mifflin County, Pennsylvania in 1841.

In 1866 Hahn moved to Philadelphia and read law in the office of Judge Morris and at Pennsylvania College. In 1867 he returned to Lake City, where he was admitted to the bar in May.

He formed a partnership with W. W. Scott, which lasted from 1867 to 1875, and a partnership with J. M. Martin, which lasted from 1876 to 1882. He was elected in 1872 as county attorney of Wabasha County, Minnesota, and was twice reelected (the last time without opposition), serving for six years.

In March 1881 he was appointed by Governor John S. Pillsbury as Minnesota Attorney General. He was afterward twice elected Attorney General, serving from 1881 to 1887. He moved to Minneapolis in May 1882 and formed a partnership with Charles H. Woods. The law firm partnership known as Woods & Hahn (now Gray Plant Mooty) continued until 1886 when Hahn was elected trust officer of the Minnesota Loan and Trust Company, which he held since his death. In 1901, the governor appointed him to the Tax Commission.

Hahn was married on September 16, 1868, to Emily Loretta Martin of Mifflin County, Pennsylvania. She died in 1891. They had five children, two sons, and three daughters. Hang subsequently married Matilda Richardson of Minneapolis, who survived him along with three daughters.

Legal offices
| Preceded by Charles M. Start | Minnesota Attorney General; 1881–1887 | Succeeded by Moses E. Clapp |
