= 1st Minnesota Infantry Monument =

Gettysburg Battlefield monument

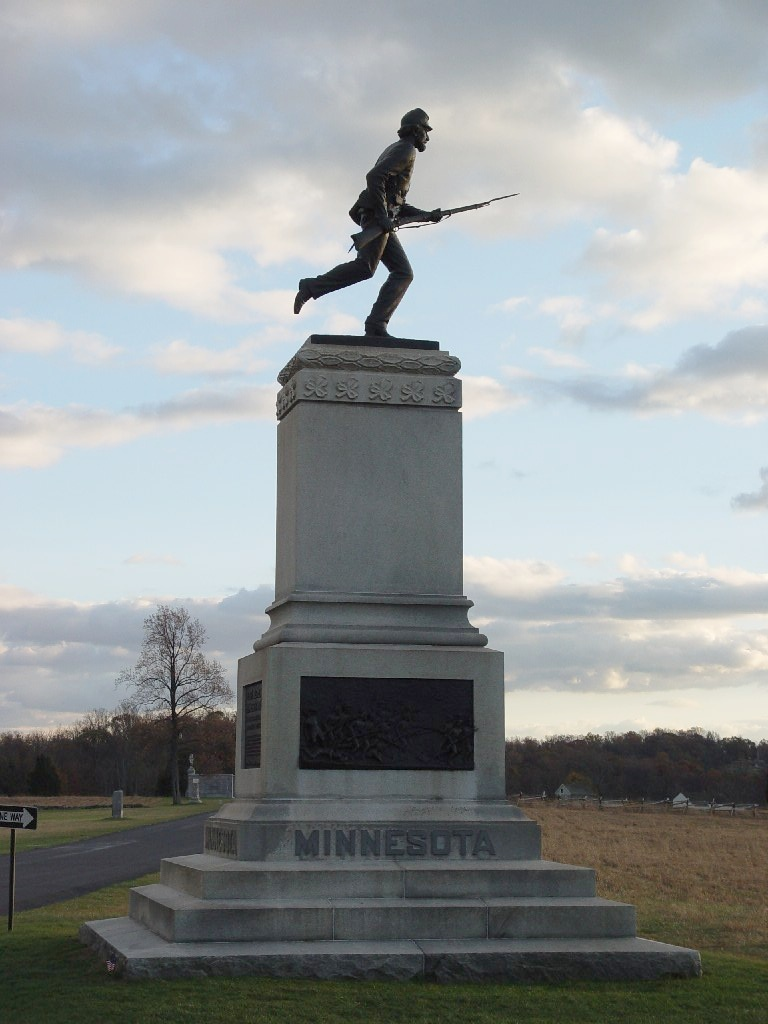
- Monument to the 1st Minnesota Infantry in 2005
- Interactive map of 1st Minnesota Infantry Monument
- Location: Gettysburg National Military Park, Pennsylvania
- Coordinates: 39°48′37.7″N 77°14′10.0″W
- Designer: Jacob Fjelde
- Fabricator: Henry Bonnard Bronze Company
- Height: 32 ft (9.8 m)
- Dedicated date: July 2, 1897

1st Minnesota Infantry Monument is an 1893 statuary memorial on the Gettysburg Battlefield. The monument is located between Cemetery Ridge and the The Angle by Plum Run where the 1st Minnesota Infantry Regiment charged against Cadmus M. Wilcox's Alabama Brigade of Richard H. Anderson's Division of the Third Corps, Army of Northern Virginia.

A secondary monument to the 1st Minnesota Infantry Regiment was also erected in 1893 showing its position during Pickett's Charge on July 3, 1863.

== History ==
The 1st Minnesota Infantry Regiment, commanded by Colonel William J. Colvill, played a crucial role on the second day of the Battle of Gettysburg on July 2, 1863. 420 men strong, the regiment was part of the reinforcements of the 1st Brigade, 2nd Division of the II Corps under the command of Brigadier General William Harrow. 32 men from Company L were detailed as skirmishers while 56 men of Company C were detached from the regiment on July 2. When Confederate General James Longstreet assaulted the troops Union General Daniel Sickles' Corps at Cemetery Ridge, a gap was formed in which the Union Army could be penetrated. Noticing this threat, Union General Winfield Scott Hancock ordered the nearest regiment to him, the 1st Minnesota, to charge forward and "Take those colors!".

With 242 men at his disposal, Colonel Colvill ordered the 1st Minnesota to charge against larger Wilcox's brigade. Outnumbered one to four, the 1st Minnesota took a 82% casualty rate in the process. The sacrifice of the 1st Minnesota at Plum Run allowed General Hancock time to reorganize his units and reinforce the section of the battlefield. The following day, remnants of the 1st Minnesota contributed towards the repulse of Pickett's Charge. During the battle several soldiers distinguished themselves, including Henry D. O'Brien of Company E who, despite being wounded, held onto the regimental colors, and Marshall Sherman of Company C who captured the 28th Virginia battle flag later on July 3. During the July 2 charge, much of the regiment's leadership, including its commander, William Colvill, along with Lieutenant Colonel Charles Powell Adams, Major Mark William Downie, and the regiment's Adjutant John Peller, were wounded.

=== First monument ===
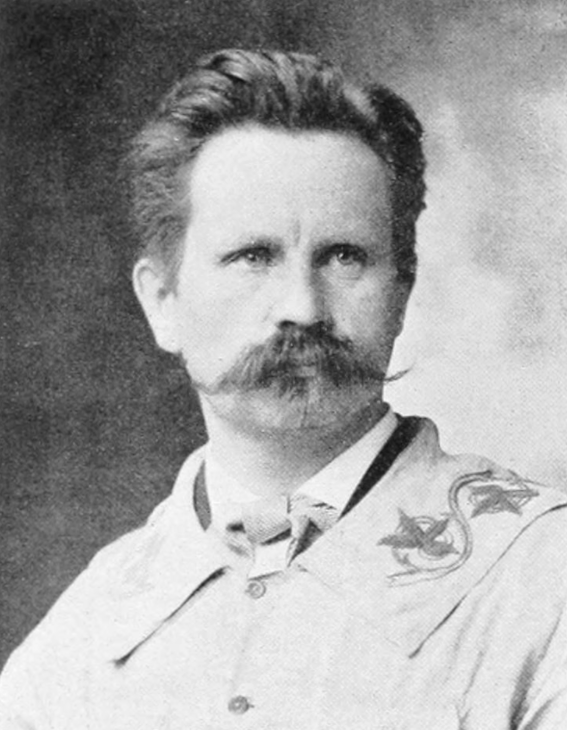
Jacob Fjelde, designer of the two monuments

In April 1891, the Minnesota Legislature appropriated $20,000 to erect two monuments at Gettysburg on behalf of veterans of the 1st Minnesota. The three commissioners appointed to design and oversee construction of the monuments were William Lochren, Christopher B. Heffelfinger (father of Pudge Heffelfinger), and Matthew Marvin, all of whom were veterans of the 1st Minnesota.

The 1st Minnesota Infantry Monument was designed by Jacob Fjelde, a Norwegian American sculptor from Minneapolis and cast by the Henry Bonnard Bronze Company of New York. The approximately-32 ft (9.8 m) monument depicts a soldier of the 1st Minnesota armed with a musket and bayonet charging toward the Emmitsburg Road with his musket raised. The base of the monument is constructed out of granite from Barre, Vermont and is decorated with several bronze relief plaques detailing the service of the 1st Minnesota and their charge at Gettysburg. The front of the monument's base is adorned with the 1861–1983 Seal of Minnesota. The 1st Minnesota monument was erected on July 2, 1893, in time for the 30th anniversary of the battle but was not dedicated until July 2, 1897.

The model chosen for the monument was Samuel Smith (born Christian Zimmerman), a German American veteran of the 1st Minnesota. Zimmerman had served as a substitute under the Enrollment Act for a man named Samuel Smith of Winona, Minnesota, enrolling under Smith's name instead of his own. Smith (Zimmerman) later served in the 2nd Minnesota Infantry Regiment and was mustered out of service in 1865. Smith's personal grave memorial is similar to that of the 1st Minnesota monument with some distinctions.

=== Second monument ===
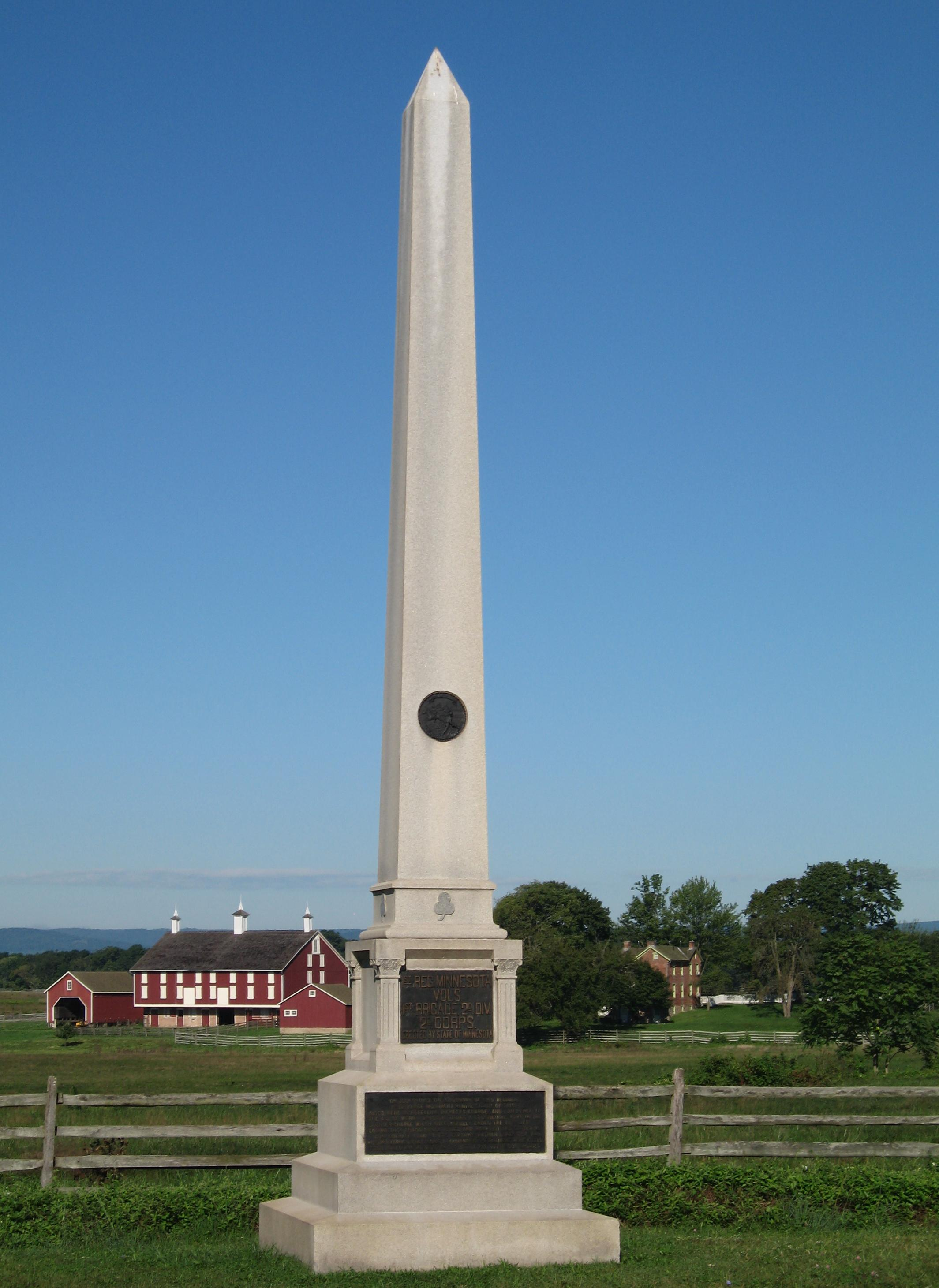
Second monument to the 1st Minnesota at Cemetery Ridge near the Codroi farm

The secondary monument to the 1st Minnesota was also erected in 1893. The second monument was built near the regiment's position during Pickett's Charge on July 3, 1863, roughly one quarter mile north of the main monument near the Codori farm. The second monument, also by Fjelde, is a smaller obelisk monument and features a bronze bas relief of the state seal with regimental service history and a depiction of the battle.

== Gallery ==
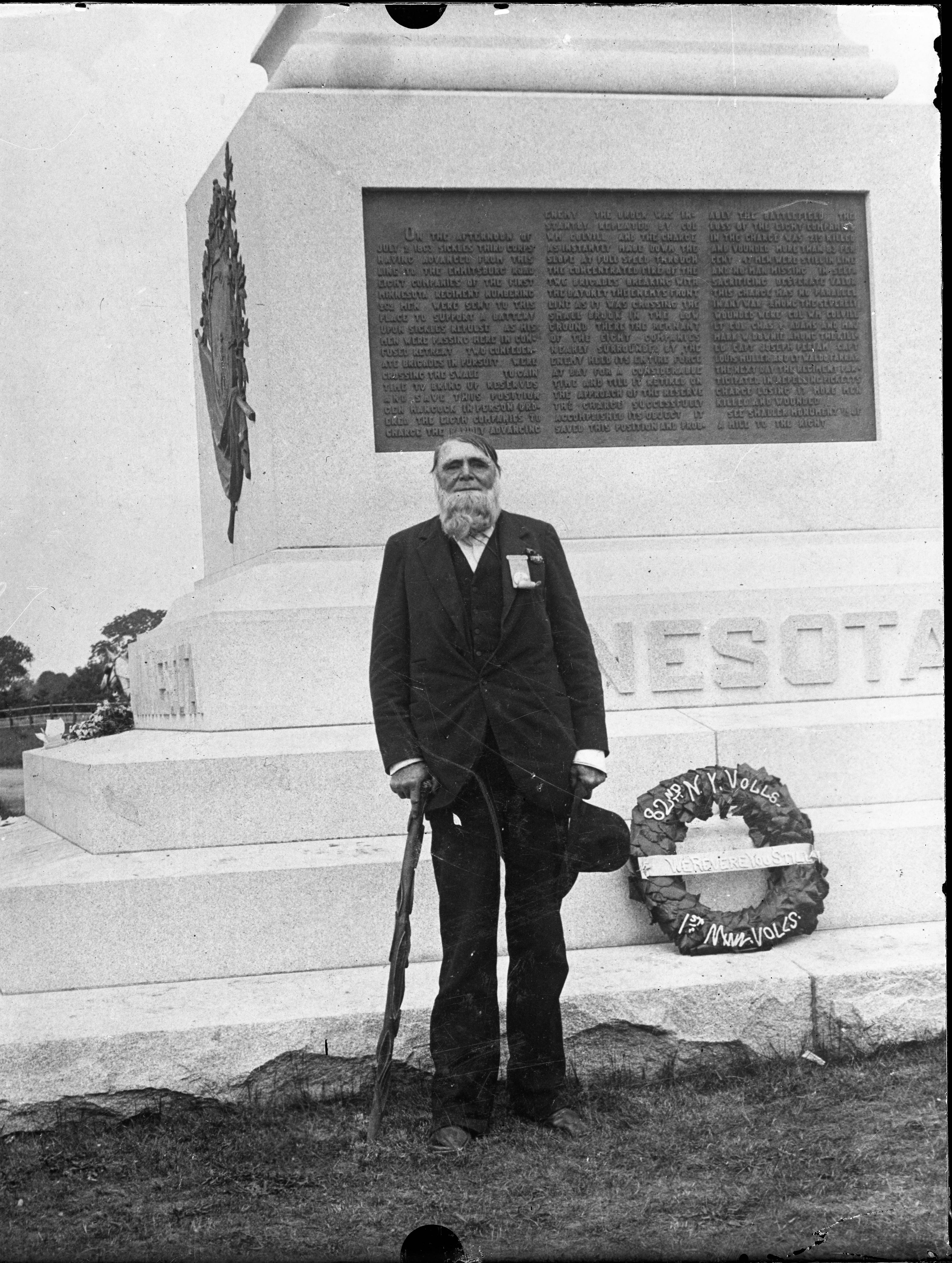
Colonel William J. Colvill at the dedication of the 1st Minnesota Monument at Gettysburg on July 2, 1897

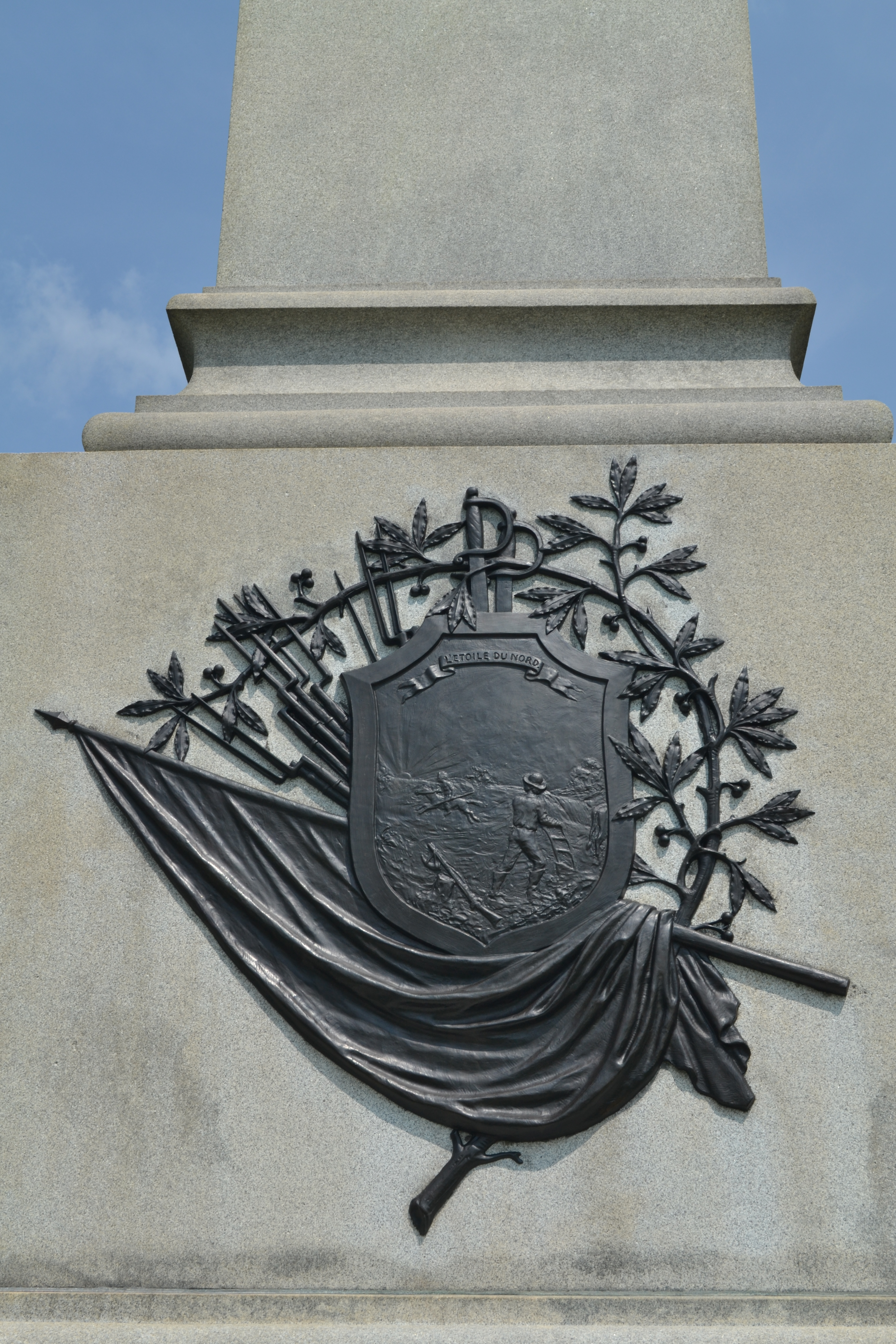
L'Étoile du Nord written on the front of the monument featuring the Seal of Minnesota draped in a flag with muskets and swords

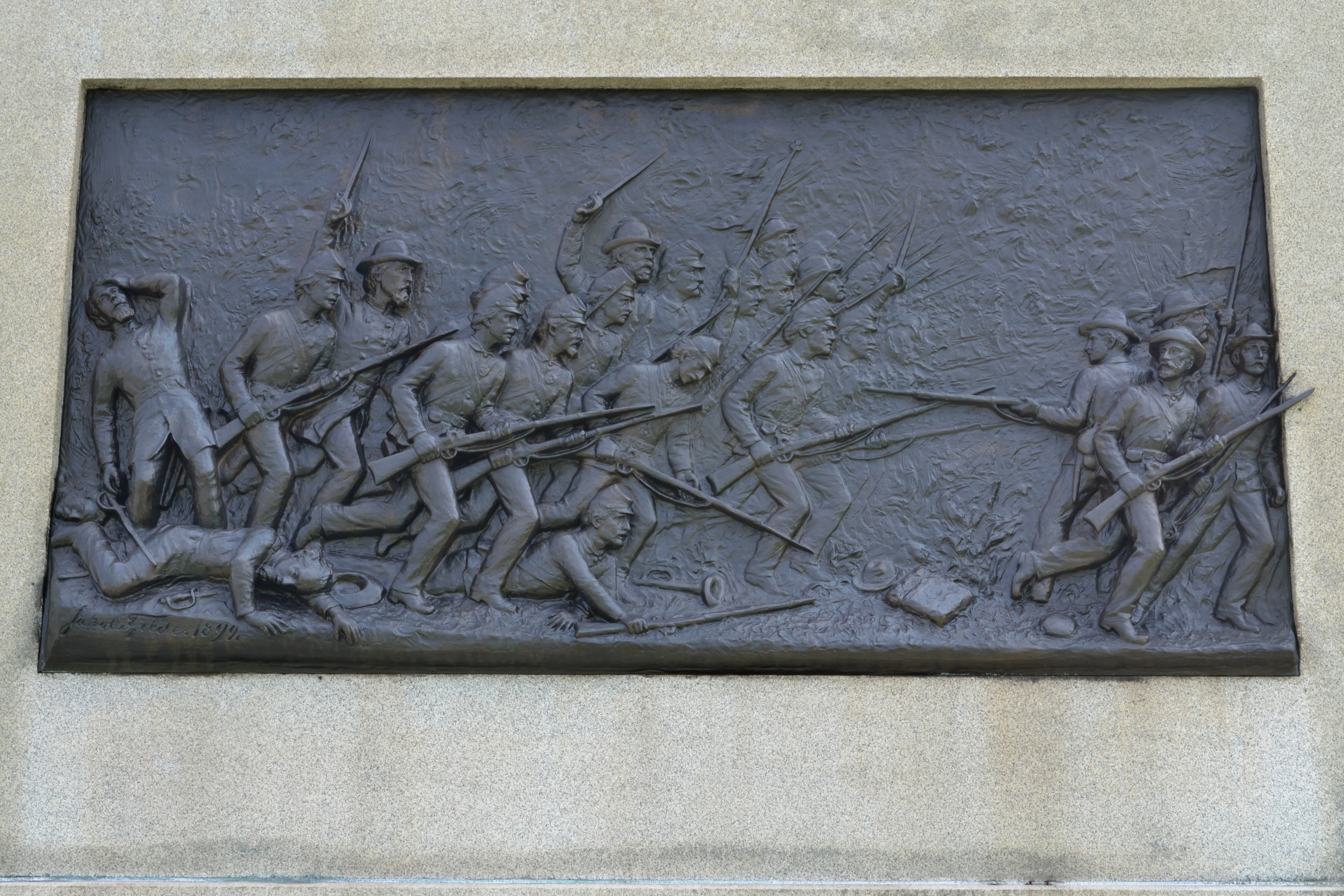
Bronze relief of the charge of the 1st Minnesota feature on the monument's left side

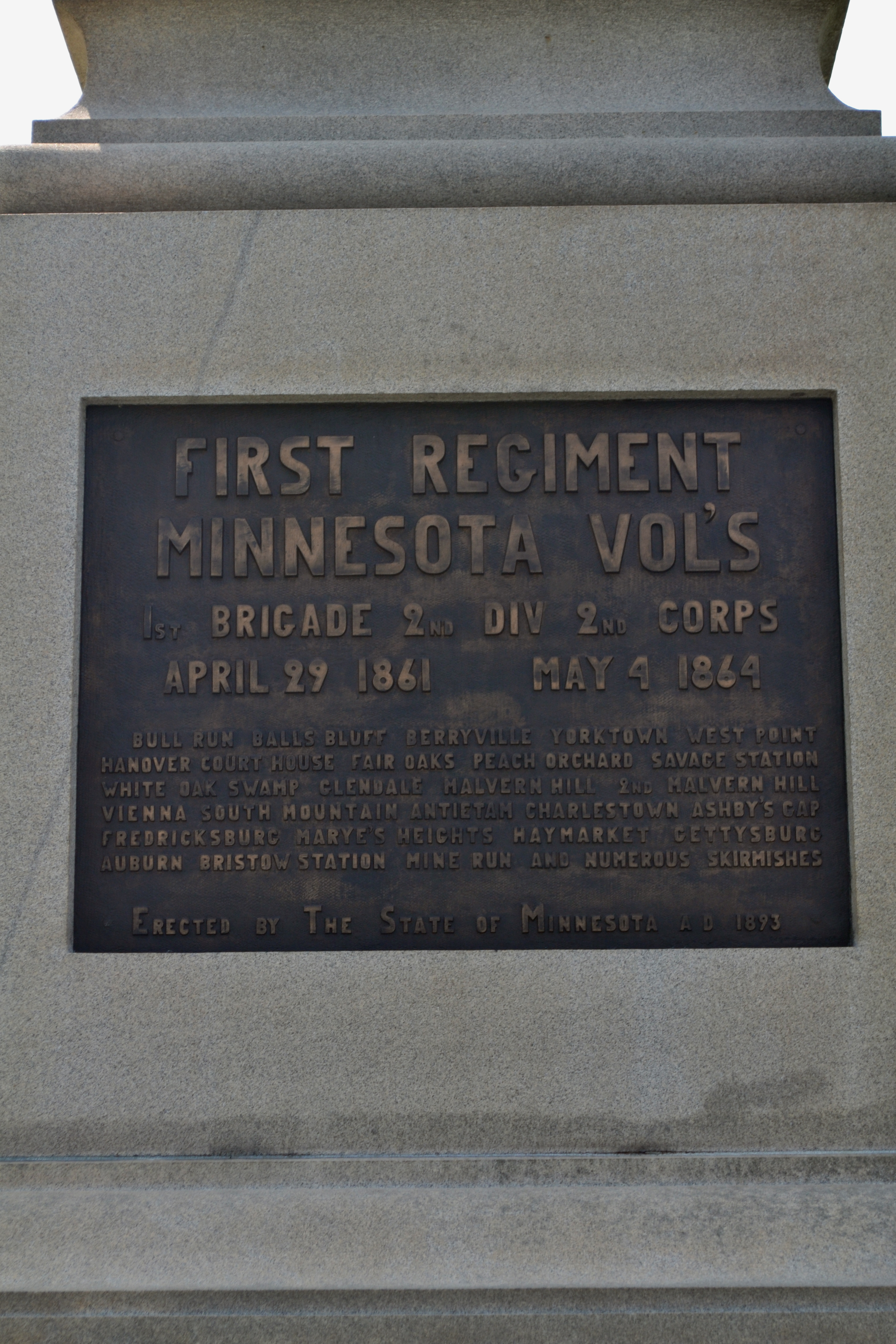
Battle honors of the 1st Minnesota listed on the back of the monument

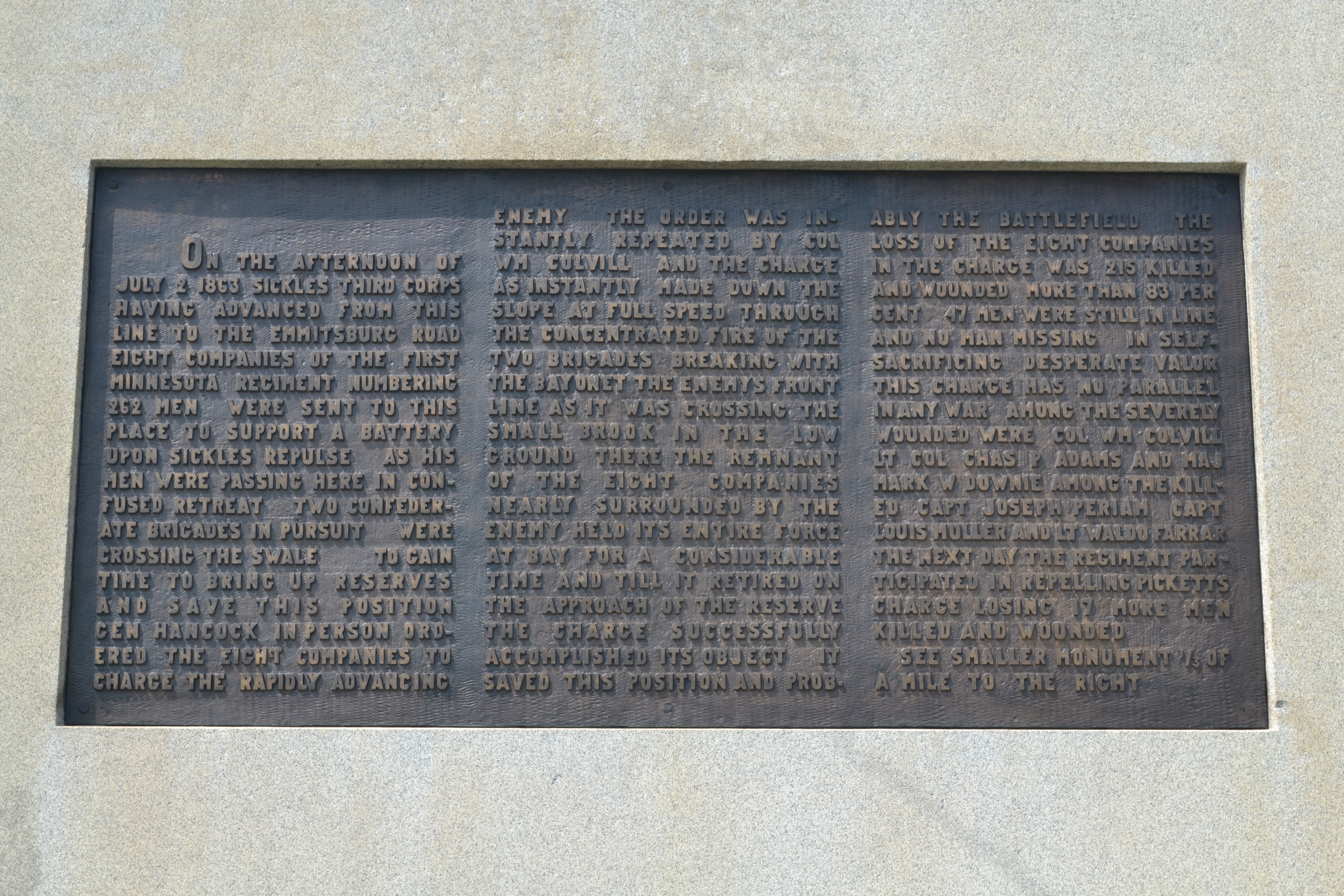
History of the regiment at Gettysburg featured on the right side of the monument

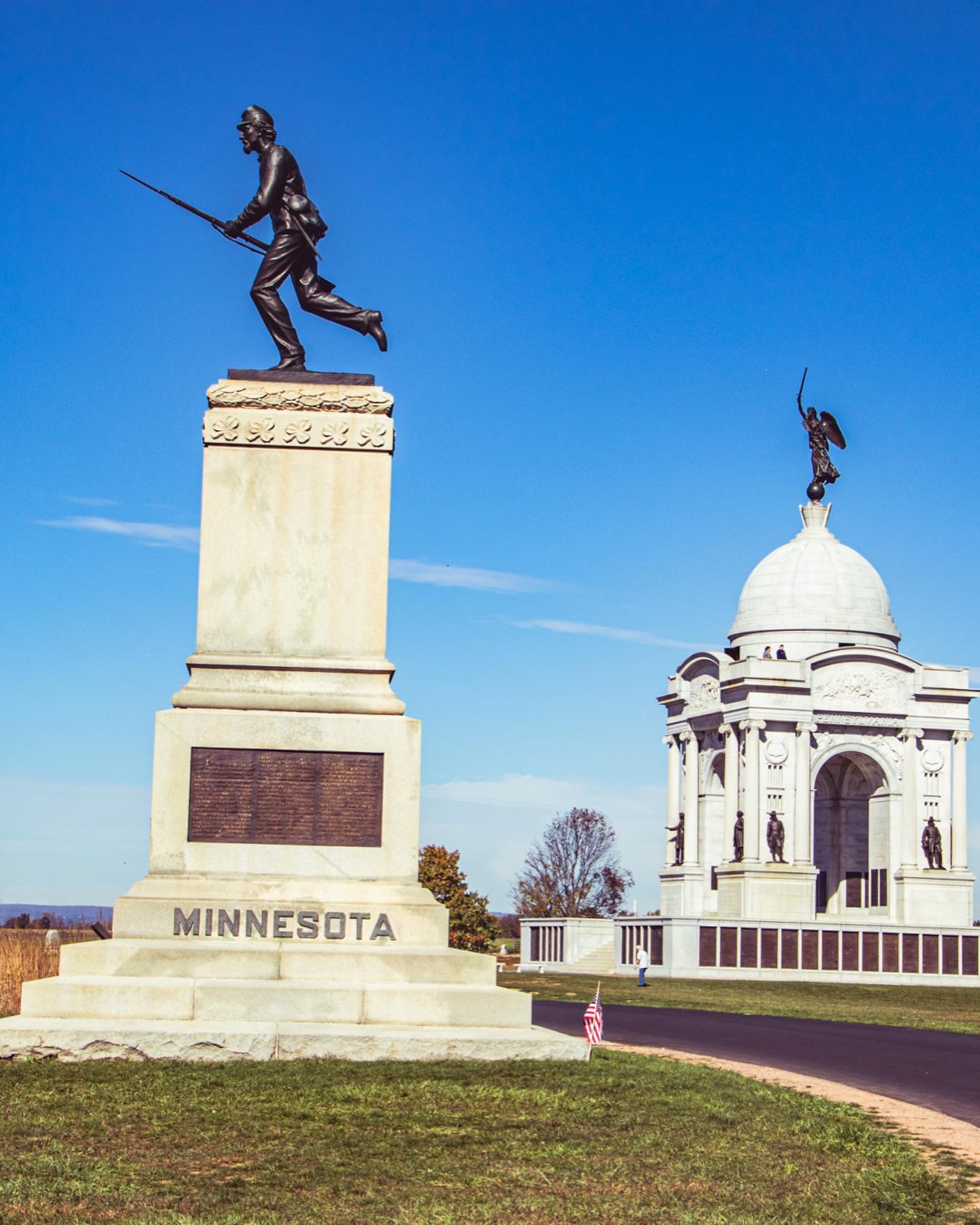
The 1st Minnesota Monument at Gettysburg, the Pennsylvania State Memorial can be seen in the background

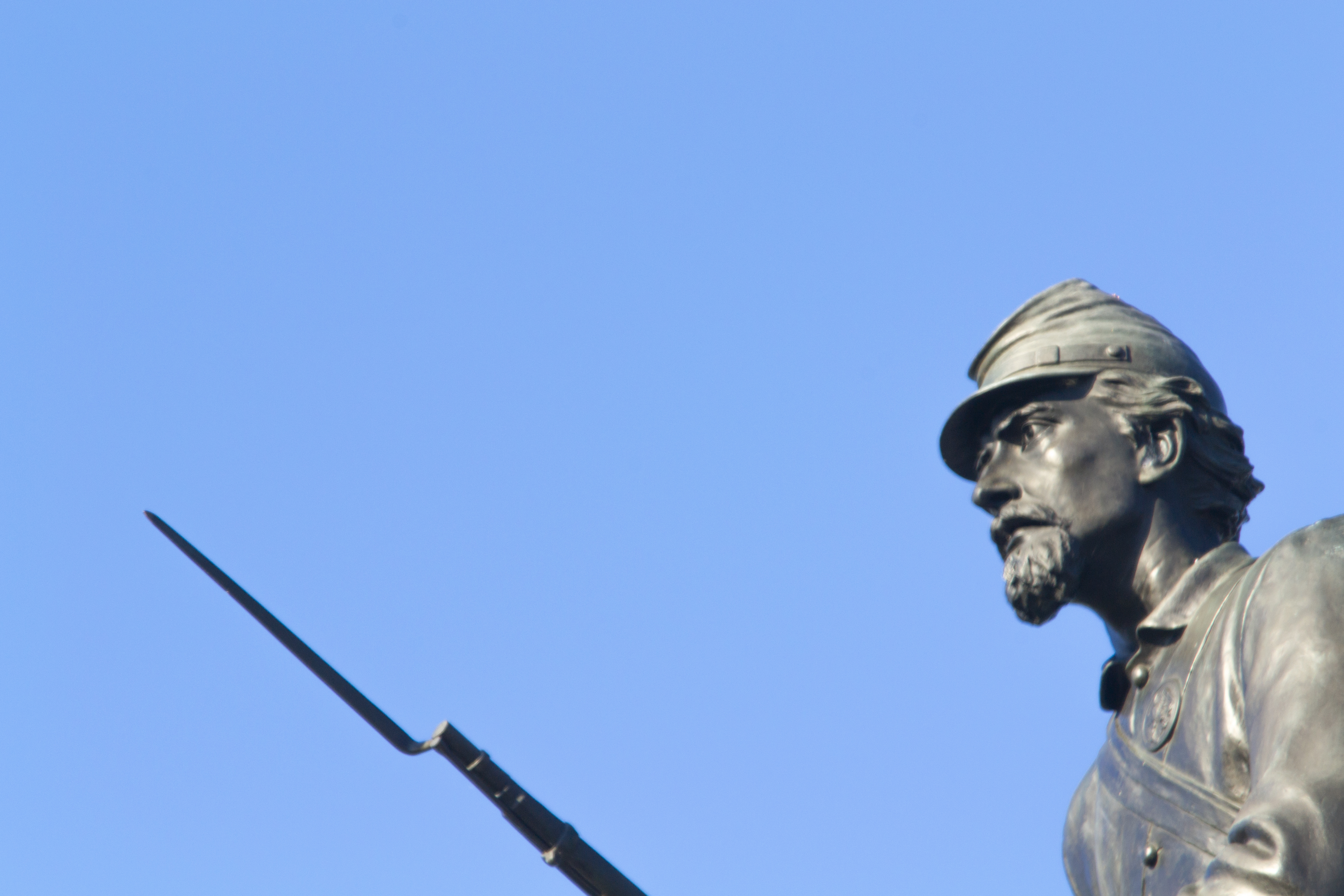
An up-close of the soldier featured at the top of the monument

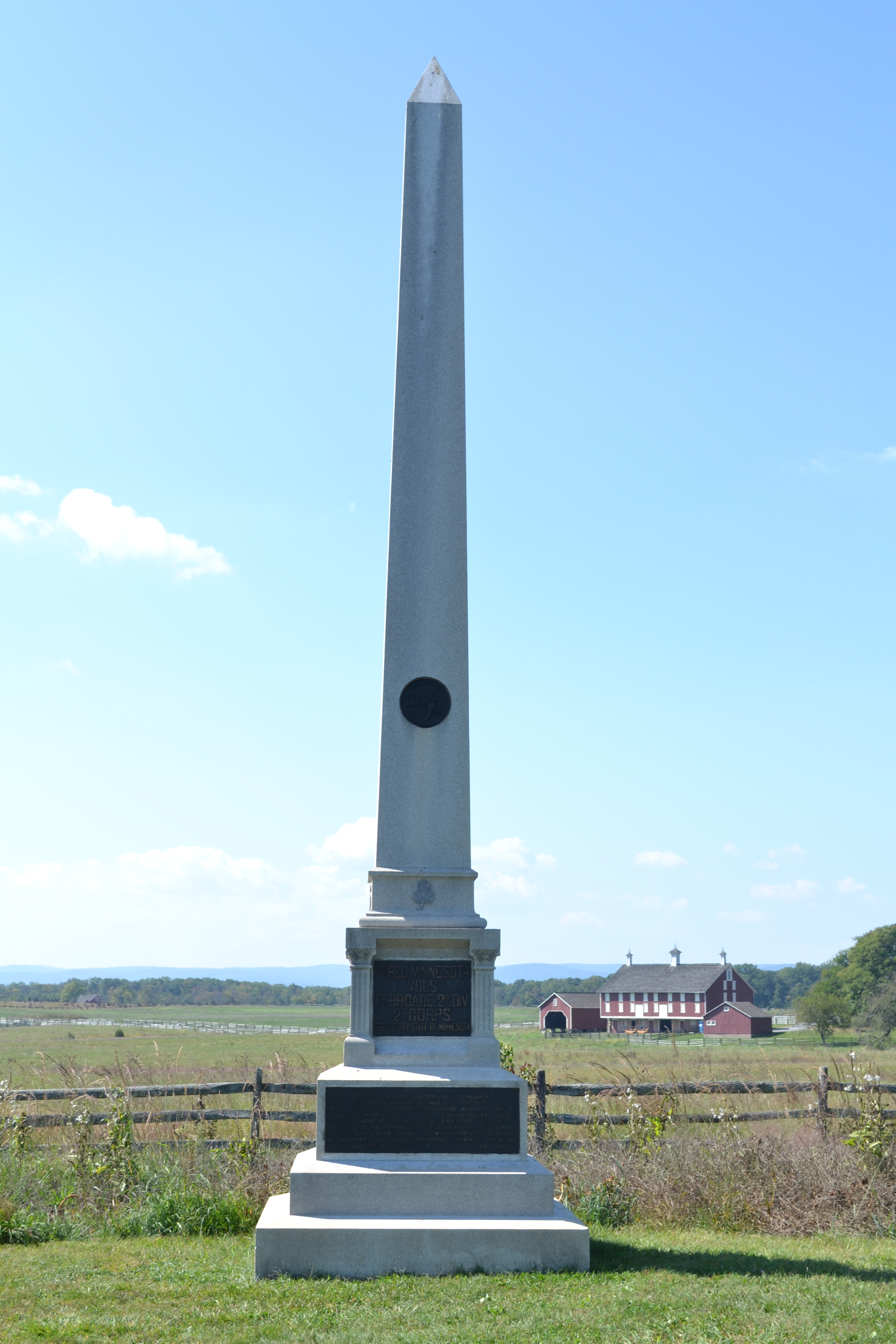
The smaller July 3, 1863 monument situated near the Codori farm
