= Adam Marty =

US Civil War soldier (1837–1923)

- Marty c. 1887
- Born: August 2, 1837; Switzerland
- Died: February 7, 1923 (aged 85); Stillwater, Minnesota, U.S.
- Military career
- Allegiance: United States of America
- Branch: Union Army
- Service years: 1861–1864
- Rank: Corporal
- Units: Company B, 1st Minnesota Infantry Regiment
- Known for: Commander of the Minnesota Department of the Grand Army of the Republic
- Conflicts: American Civil War

Adam Marty (August 2, 1837 – February 7, 1923) was a Swiss-born member of the First Minnesota Volunteer Infantry Regiment during the American Civil War. After the war he became Commander of the Minnesota Department of the Grand Army of the Republic.

== Early life ==
Marty was born in Switzerland on August 2, 1837. When Marty was two, his father immigrated to the United States, settling in Stillwater. Marty's mother died when he was six. He was raised by his aunt and uncle in Switzerland until the family immigrated to St. Louis, Missouri. They moved to Stillwater when Marty was twelve. Marty lived with his father for a time, but they had a strained relationship as Marty grew older.

Before the Civil War, Marty worked as a farmhand for local land owner Henry Jackman. At the age of eighteen he began an apprenticeship under Mort Webster, a Stillwater carriage painter. When news of the outbreak of the Civil War reached Stillwater, Marty enlisted in a local militia unit called the Stillwater Guards. Three of Marty's cousins also enlisted, including Samuel Bloomer. Marty and Bloomer were close and remained so throughout the war years and beyond. On April 29, 1861, Marty and his fellow guards marched to Fort Snelling and were enlisted in the First Minnesota Volunteer Infantry Regiment. The Stillwater Guards became Company B of the regiment.

== First Minnesota Volunteer Infantry ==
As a member of the First Minnesota, Adam Marty fought in many early Civil War battles such as Bull Run, Ball's Bluff, and the Peninsula Campaign. In a series of letters, Marty would document the experiences of himself and a core group of friends: Rufus Blanchard, John Densmore, Oscar Cornman, and his closest friend and cousin, Sam Bloomer. Adam called this group a “good jolly crew.” Together they would fight in nearly every battle, up until the Battle of Antietam. On September 17, 1862, his friend Oscar would die, shot through the head, while his cousin Sam would get shot in the leg while carrying the regimental colors. Bloomer's leg required amputation, and he eventually returned home to Stillwater, serving in the Invalid Corps. Marty continued to serve with the First Minnesota through the battles of Fredericksburg and Chancellorsville, and ultimately Gettysburg. Though Marty no longer had Cornman and Bloomer by his side, he still had John and Rufus who would fight by Marty's side in the most pivotal battle of the Civil War. On July 2, 1863, the First Minnesota was ordered to charge a numerically superior Confederate force in order to protect the Union line at Gettysburg. The First Minnesota took the highest casualties of any regiment during the war: eighty-two percent. Company B entered the battle with thirty-six men, by the end of the charge only six remained standing. Marty and Rufus were among the wounded. A musket ball tore a large hole in his Marty's right thigh. Rufus would get a piece of shrapnel in his side, and be forever known as “Old Ironsides.” And John Densmore would die on the battlefield carrying the colors of the First Minnesota.

After being wounded Marty was sent to South Street Hospital in Philadelphia. He was bedridden for several agonizing months. Eventually he healed enough to get out and socialize, making friends and attending cultural events. In April 1864 Marty traveled home to Minnesota and was mustered out with the rest of the First Minnesota Volunteers on May 5, 1864.

== Post-Civil War ==
After the war Marty returned to Stillwater and worked as a carriage painter. He had no lasting physical limitations from his war service. He married Ottilie Hoffman in 1869, but she died in childbirth in 1870 along with the couple's daughter. In 1884 he married Augusta Burrow. They had four children: Carl, Raymond, Arline, and Milton. In 1872 Marty was a charter member of the Stillwater Fire Department. He was appointed deputy sheriff in 1882. In 1890, he was elected sheriff of Washington County, serving two terms.

Marty was also deeply involved in the Grand Army of the Republic (GAR). He joined Stillwater's Muller Post in 1875 and served as post commander for six terms. In 1881, Marty was elected Commander of the statewide organization. Together he and Bloomer rejuvenated the GAR in Minnesota. Marty also helped form the "Last Man's Club" in 1887 for members of Company B. It was the first of its kind in the nation. The members created an annual reunion on the anniversary of the Battle of Bull Run. As members died their chair would be draped in black.

After 1910, Marty moved to St. Paul. His wife died in 1922 and Marty then moved in with his daughter. He died at her home February 7, 1923, and was buried in Fairview Cemetery in Stillwater.
