= Gordon Cole =

Gordon Cole may refer to:

- Gordon Cole (Twin Peaks), a character on the U.S. TV series Twin Peaks
- Gordon Cole, a minor character in the U.S. film Sunset Boulevard
- Gordon E. Cole (1833–1890), Minnesota Attorney General
