= Samuel Bloomer =

American Civil War soldier (1835–1917)

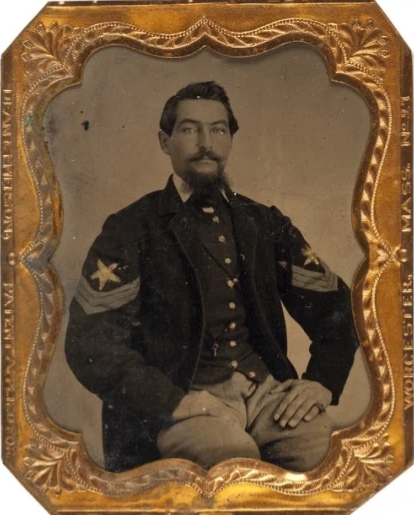
- Bloomer c.1862

Treasurer of Washington County, Minnesota
- In office 1888–1894

Personal details
- Born: October 30, 1825 Engi, Switzerland
- Died: October 4, 1917 (aged 91) Stillwater, Minnesota, U.S.
- Resting place: Fairview Cemetery; Stillwater, Minnesota, U.S.
- Spouse: 2
- Children: 4
- Occupation: Carpenter soldier politician

Military service
- Allegiance: United States of America
- Branch/service: Union Army; Veteran Reserve Corps
- Years of service: 1861-1866
- Rank: First Lieutenant
- Unit: 1st Minnesota Infantry Regiment
- Commands: 36th and the 120th Companies of the Veteran Reserve Corps
- Battles/wars: American Civil War

Samuel Bloomer (November 30, 1835 – October 4, 1917) was a Swiss American carpenter who served in Company B of the First Minnesota Volunteer Infantry Regiment during the American Civil War. He was the regiment's color sergeant, and after the war he was deeply involved in civic life and the Grand Army of the Republic.

== Early life ==
Bloomer was born in Switzerland on November 30, 1835. He immigrated to the United States in 1846 with family, including his first cousin, Adam Marty. The family settled in St. Louis in Missouri for a time before moving to Stillwater, Minnesota. Bloomer worked on the Henry Jackman farm as a carpenter. He was a member of the "Wide Awakes", a group that supported Lincoln during the 1860 election.

== First Minnesota Volunteer Infantry ==
When news of the Civil War reached Minnesota, Bloomer and his cousins joined the Stillwater Guards, a local militia group. The Guards were mustered into the First Minnesota Volunteer Infantry Regiment at Fort Snelling on April 29, 1861, forming the nucleus of Company B. Bloomer was initially given the rank of corporal and participated in all the regiment's major engagements until the Battle of Antietam. He was wounded slightly in the head at the Battle of Bull Run. During the Battle of Savage's Station on June 29, 1862, which was part of the Peninsula Campaign, Bloomer was promoted to color sergeant. In the midst of the engagement the standard bearer was killed. Bloomer picked up the colors, and was separated from the regiment for five hours. He returned the colors to the regiment and was promoted for his bravery.

While carrying the colors during the Battle of Antietam, Bloomer received a gunshot wound below his right knee. He crawled to safety behind a nearby oak tree as the First Minnesota retreated. Bloomer lay there until the next day when Confederate soldiers carried him to a barn. Eventually Bloomer came into the care of his comrades when the Confederates retreated. On September 20, 1862, his leg was amputated. Bloomer spent the rest of his service in military hospitals until he was discharged on December 2, 1862. He returned to Stillwater, but became very restless and heartbroken when a local woman refused his proposal of marriage. He accepted a commission as a lieutenant in the Veteran Reserve Corps, Bloomer served in the 36th and 120th companies of the 2nd Battalion while in the VRC. Bloomer also briefly worked with the Freedmen's Bureau while stationed in Pine Bluff, Arkansas. Bloomer served until September 19, 1866, when he was mustered out of service.

== Later life ==
During his Reserve Corps service he met Matilda J. Burns and married her on December 6, 1863. They had four children together. The couple resided in Stillwater after Bloomer's service. The veteran worked as a guard at the Stillwater Prison, as an insurance agent, and sewing machine salesman. In September 1875 Bloomer caught his wife committing adultery. They were divorced in 1878 and Bloomer received custody of the children. He married his second wife, Ellen Pressell, in 1882. Bloomer was subsequently employed as Washington County Treasurer for six years, and established a summer camp on White Bear Lake afterward.

Like his cousin Adam Marty, Bloomer was deeply involved in the Grand Army of the Republic (GAR). He was appointed Assistant Adjutant General of the GAR by Marty in 1881 and played a pivotal role in reestablishing the organization in Minnesota. He was a member of both Acker Post in St. Paul and Muller Post in Stillwater. In addition to the Grand Army of the Republic, Bloomer was a member of the Last Man's Club along with most of Stillwater's Company B veterans.

Bloomer was also involved in veterans' affairs outside these two organizations. In 1905 he was given the honor of carrying the First Minnesota's battle flag from the old state capitol to the new. He also formed an organization which raised money and erected a soldier's monument on the grounds of the Washington County Courthouse in 1916. By 1915 Bloomer could barely walk and needed two canes to do so. He died on October 4, 1917, and was buried in Fairview Cemetery in Stillwater. An imposing monument of Bloomer as the First Minnesota's color bearer marks the site of his burial.
