= George N. Morgan =

Union United States Army general

George Nelson Morgan
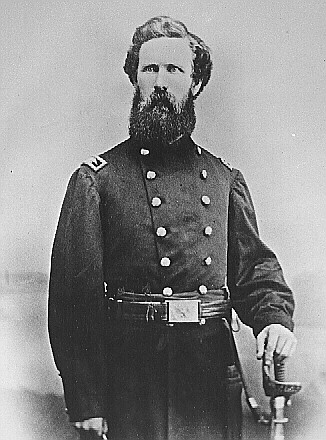
- Born: September 7, 1825; Long Sault Island, St Lawrence River
- Died: July 24, 1866 (aged 40); Minneapolis, Minnesota
- Military career
- Allegiance: United States of America; Union
- Branch: United States Army; Union Army
- Service years: 1861–1866
- Rank: Colonel; Brevet Brigadier General
- Commands: 1st Minnesota Infantry Regiment; 2nd Regiment, Veteran Reserve Corps; Fort Snelling
- Conflicts: American Civil War; First Battle of Bull Run; Battle of Ball's Bluff; Peninsula Campaign; Siege of Yorktown (1862); Battle of Seven Pines; Battle of Savage's Station; Battle of White Oak Swamp; Battle of Glendale; Battle of Malvern Hill; Battle of South Mountain; Battle of Antietam; Battle of Fredericksburg; Sioux Wars

George Nelson Morgan (September 7, 1825 – July 24, 1866) was a Union Army officer in the American Civil War.

== Early life ==
George Nelson Morgan was born on Long Sault Island, between Cornwall, Ontario and Massena, New York, September 7, 1825, to William Sidney Morgan Jr. (1786-1847) from Stormont County, and Mary Moore (1791-1870). William S. Morgan Jr. served as a Sergeant in the Stormont Militia at the Battle of Ogdensburg during the War of 1812. His father, William S. Morgan Sr. (1752-1836), was born in Ireland and joined the 53rd Regiment of Foot in 1776, sailing from Ireland to fight for the British Army in the American Revolution. He fought at the Battle of Trois-Rivières, Battle of Valcour Island, and at the Battle of Saratoga where he was captured when John Burgoyne surrendered. William Morgan Sr. was granted land in Canada after the war in 1784, settling in Osnabruck Township, Stormont County. He commanded the Flank Companies of the Stormont Militia during the War of 1812 at the Battle of Ogdensburg.

George N. Morgan moved St. Catharines, Ontario in the late 1840s, before immigrating to Minnesota in 1856, where he was a foundry and machine shop operator.

== Civil War ==
Morgan joined the 1st Minnesota Volunteer Infantry and was appointed captain, May 29, 1861, major, October 23, 1861, lieutenant colonel, October 2, 1862, and colonel, November 14, 1862. He commanded the regiment at the Battle of Fredericksburg. He had temporary command of a brigade in the Army of the Potomac, beginning December 14, 1862.

Because of tuberculosis, he resigned, May 4, 1863, but was recovered sufficiently to be appointed major of the 2nd Regiment, Veteran Reserve Corps, May 26, 1863 and colonel, September 25, 1863. He commanded Fort Snelling, Minnesota, a training facility and frontier outpost during the Sioux and Dakota Wars.

== Post War ==
On January 13, 1866, President Andrew Johnson nominated Morgan for appointment to the grade of brevet brigadier general of volunteers, to rank from March 13, 1865, and the United States Senate confirmed the appointment on March 12, 1866. Morgan was mustered out of the volunteers on June 30, 1866.

Morgan's tuberculosis worsened and he died at Minneapolis, Minnesota, July 24, 1866. He was buried at Lakewood Cemetery, Minneapolis.

His eldest son, George H. Morgan, became a cavalry officer and was awarded the Medal of Honor during the Indian Wars, while his younger son, Colonel Alfred Sully Morgan, named for George's tentmate and commanding officer in the 1st Minnesota, Alfred Sully, served in the Spanish–American War at the Battle of Manila (1898), the Philippine–American War, and World War 1.

== Namesake ==
Morgan Avenue in Minneapolis is named for George N. Morgan.

== See also ==
- List of American Civil War brevet generals (Union)
