= Charles Powell Adams =

American Union Army officer (1831–1893)

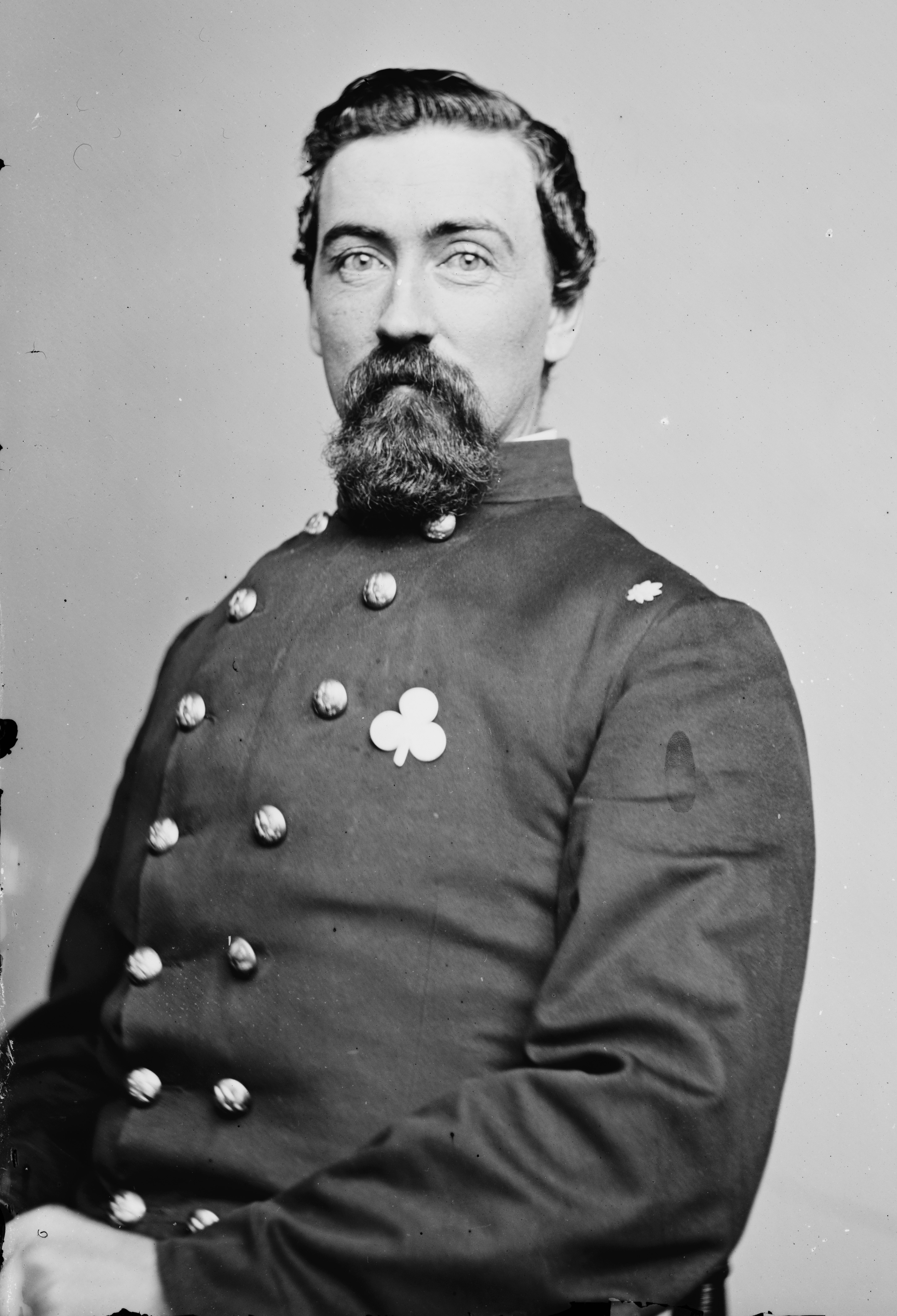
- Charles Powell Adams
- Born: March 3, 1831; Rainsburg, Pennsylvania, U.S.
- Died: November 2, 1893 (aged 62); Vermillion, Minnesota, U.S.
- Burial place: Hastings, Minnesota
- Education: Ohio Medical College
- Military career
- Allegiance: United States
- Branch: United States Army
- Service years: 1861–1866
- Rank: Lieutenant Colonel; Bvt. Brigadier General
- Unit: 1st Minnesota Infantry Regiment
- Commands: Hatch's Minnesota Cavalry Battalion
- Conflicts: American Civil War; Battle of Malvern Hill (WIA); Battle of Antietam (WIA); Battle of Gettysburg; American Indian Wars; Sioux Wars

Charles Powell Adams (March 3, 1831 – November 2, 1893) was a Colonel in the Union Army, physician and politician. He was a territorial house member and a senator in the Minnesota legislature, and also served as mayor of Hastings, Minnesota, for one term. During the Civil War, he fought at the Battle of Malvern Hill, the Battle of Antietam and the Battle of Gettysburg, where he was severely wounded.

He was a member of the Minnesota State Medical Society, the American Medical Association, an honorary member of the State Medical Society of California, and a member and ex-president of the Rocky Mountain Medical Society. He was also a member of the Masonic Grand Lodge of Minnesota.

== Biography ==
Charles Powell Adams was born on March 3, 1831, in Rainsburg, Pennsylvania. He was of English, Scottish and German descent. He attended public schools and the Bedford Academy in Coshocton County, Ohio. At the age of 18, he studied medicine for one year with Dr. W. R. Waddell in West Bedford, Ohio. He then studied with two doctors in Amity, Knox County, Ohio, before entering the Ohio Medical College, where he graduated from in 1851. The following year he started a practice in Waymansville, Indiana, where he remained until 1854, when he then moved to Hastings, Minnesota. In 1856, he was elected to the territorial house in the Minnesota legislature, representing Dakota, Rice and Scott counties. In 1859, Adams bought a grocery store which he ran for a number of years and about the same time he began the publication of a newspaper, the Hastings Democrat.

In 1872 he was elected mayor of Hastings, and at the end of his term, declined to run for re-election. In 1878 he was elected to the Minnesota state senate for a term of four years. In 1869 and 1870 he participated in the organization of the Minnesota State Medical Society, and was a member of the American Medical Association. He was also an honorary member of the State Medical Society of California, and a member and ex-president of the Rocky Mountain Medical Society. In 1856, he was made a member of the Masonic Grand Lodge of Minnesota.

== Military service ==
Adams was mustered into military service as a private on April 29, 1861, and was subsequently commissioned captain of Company H, 1st Minnesota Infantry Regiment on April 30, 1861. He served as captain until September 26, 1862, when he was commissioned as major of the same regiment.^{:19} He was then commissioned as a lieutenant colonel of this regiment, in which rank he served until the regiment was mustered out on May 6, 1864. He re-entered the service as a major on July 8, 1864, commanding Hatch's Minnesota Cavalry Battalion. He was promoted to lieutenant colonel of this battalion on September 5, 1864; made brevet colonel on March 13, 1865, and was commissioned brevet brigadier general on May 22, 1866. He was mustered out of service on June 16, 1866. During the Battle of Gettysburg he participated in the attacks of the 1st Minnesota Infantry Regiment and was wounded next to Colonel William J. Colvill.

After he was mustered out at the end of the Civil War, Adams was a commander of a cavalry and artillery, that led a successful campaign against the Sioux in 1866. In 1877 he was elected president of the Dakota County Veterans Association.

=== Injuries sustained ===
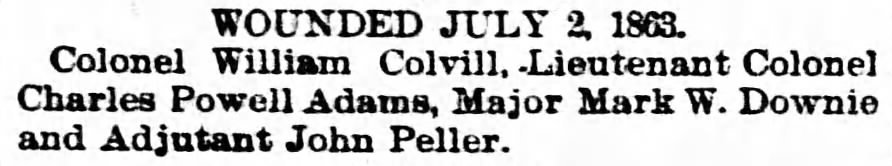
Newspaper clipping from Mower County Transcript, Minnesota's Pride, wounded July 2, 1863

Adams suffered from numerous wounds and injuries during his military career. He was in every battle from the first Bull Run to Gettysburg. His first wound was in July 1862 at the Battle of Malvern Hill, then he was wounded again in September 1862 at the Battle of Antietam. His worst injuries were sustained on July 2, 1863, at Gettysburg, where he was wounded in the left shoulder, left cheek, left lung, in the groin area, in the abdomen, and in the left thigh, which broke his femur. He was left for dead on the battlefield, but was eventually found by his fellow soldiers, who took him to a hospital in Littlestown, Pennsylvania, and then he was transferred to a Baltimore, Maryland hospital. A newspaper article from 1884 reported: "In a modest home in Hastings, writhing on a bed of anguish, a hero lies dying". They reported his condition as "hopeless from thirteen wounds received in the war of the rebellion and the blood poison which supervened after surgical operations performed on him. His life might have been prolonged perhaps had he consented to have a limb amputated. Now the injured member is an advanced stage of atrophy".

Quotes about Adams:

I desire to call attention of the provost marshal general to the fact that this is a distinguished officer. He won great renown at Gettysburg and is referred to in my official report of that action. — General Winfield Scott Hancock
Lieut. Col. Charles P. Adams, whose gallantry on every battlefield, attested by his many wounds, won for him the brevet rank of brigadier general. — United States district judge William Lochren

== Personal life ==
Adams was married three times, with his first marriage in February 1852, to Mary Florence Buxton, who died in October 1858. He then married Mary J. Hoover in 1860, and after her death, he married Mary S. Pettibone in 1873. He had two children with his first wife. Adams died on November 2, 1893, in Vermillion, Minnesota, and is buried in Lakeside Cemetery in Hastings.

Upon his death, the papers of General Adams were bequeathed to the Minnesota Historical Society. William Watts Folwell used the papers in the preparation of the second volume of his book History of Minnesota.

== See also ==
- List of costliest American Civil War land battles
- Troop engagements of the American Civil War, 1863
