= 1st Minnesota Infantry Regiment =

1st Minnesota Volunteer Infantry Regiment
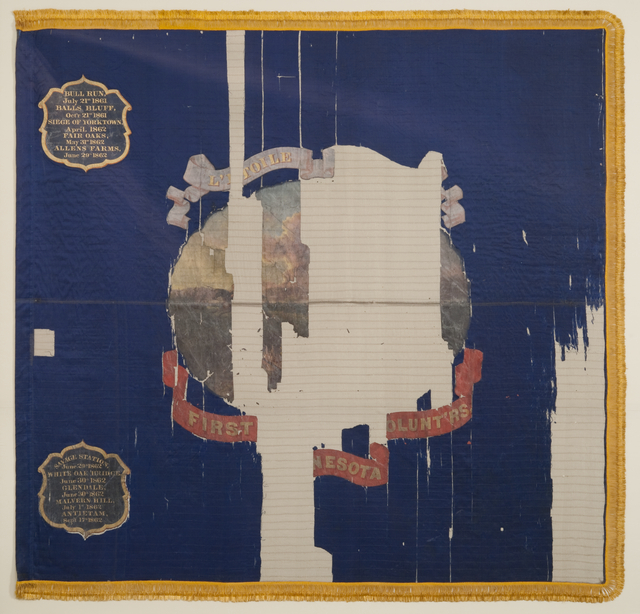
- Regimental Banner of the 1st Minnesota Volunteer Infantry Regiment (Inspired by the former flag of Minnesota)
- Active: April 29, 1861, to April 2, 1864 (July 15, 1865 as 1st Minnesota Infantry Battalion)
- Country: United States
- Allegiance: Union
- Branch: Infantry
- Equipment: M1861 Springfield .58 Rifle-musket; M1842 Springfield .69 Smoothbore; M1842 Springfield .69 Rifle-musket; -M1855 Springfield .58 Rifle-musket; Sharps Rifle (Company L only)
- Engagements: American Civil War; First Battle of Bull Run (1861); Battle of Ball's Bluff (1861); Siege of Yorktown (1862) (Not Engaged) (1862); Battle of Seven Pines (1862); Battle of Savage's Station (1862); Battle of Malvern Hill (In Reserve) (1862); Second Battle of Bull Run (Rearguard) (1862); Battle of Antietam (1862); Battle of Fredericksburg (In Reserve) (1863); Second Battle of Fredericksburg (1863); Battle of Gettysburg (1863); Battle of Bristoe Station (1863); Battle of Mine Run (1863)

Commanders
- Notable commanders: Colonel Willis A. Gorman; Colonel Napoleon J.T. Dana; Colonel Alfred Sully; Colonel George N. Morgan; Colonel William J. Colvill

The 1st Minnesota Infantry Regiment was a Union infantry regiment that was active during the American Civil War and participated in the battles of First Bull Run, Antietam, and Gettysburg. An urn, mounted within the Minnesota section of the Soldiers' National Cemetery at Gettysburg includes, "All time is the millenium of their glory."

== History ==
=== Organization and early service ===
On April 14, 1861, Alexander Ramsey, the Governor of Minnesota, learned of the attack on Fort Sumter, while visiting Washington, D.C. Alongside Senator Morton S. Wilkinson, he visited the office of the Secretary of War, Simon Cameron, to offer the services of 1,000 Minnesota soldiers to the Union Army.

Two days later, the Adjutant General of Minnesota, William H. Acker, issued an order for Minnesota's Commissary General, H. Z. Mitchell, to enlist men for the 1st Minnesota Regiment. After the news spread, communities and individuals in Minnesota created volunteer organizations. The companies traveled to the newly reactivated Fort Snelling to be enlisted in the regiment on April 29, 1861.

On May 10, 1861, the regiment was re-enlisted for three more years of service. From Fort Snelling, they departed by steamboats down the Mississippi River to connect with an eastern rail line.

Josias R. King of the St. Paul Pioneer Guard, is often credited as the first northern volunteer to answer Lincoln's call for troops.

Company	Earliest Moniker	Primary Location of Recruitment	Earliest Captain
A	Pioneer Guard	St. Paul	Alexander Wilkin
B	Stillwater Guard	Stillwater	Carlyle A. Bromley
C	St. Paul Volunteers	St. Paul	William Henry Acker
D	Lincoln Guards	Minneapolis	Henry R. Putnam
E	St. Anthony Zouaves	St. Anthony	George N. Morgan
F	Red Wing Volunteers or Goodhue County Volunteers	Red Wing	William J. Colvill, Jr.
G	Faribault Guards	Faribault	William H. Dike
H	Dakota County Volunteers	Hastings	Charles Powell Adams
I	Wabasha Volunteers	Wabasha	John H. Pell
K	Winona Volunteers	Winona	Henry C. Lester
L	Sharpshooters (Company A, 2nd United States Sharpshooters)	Rice & Steele Counties	William Russell

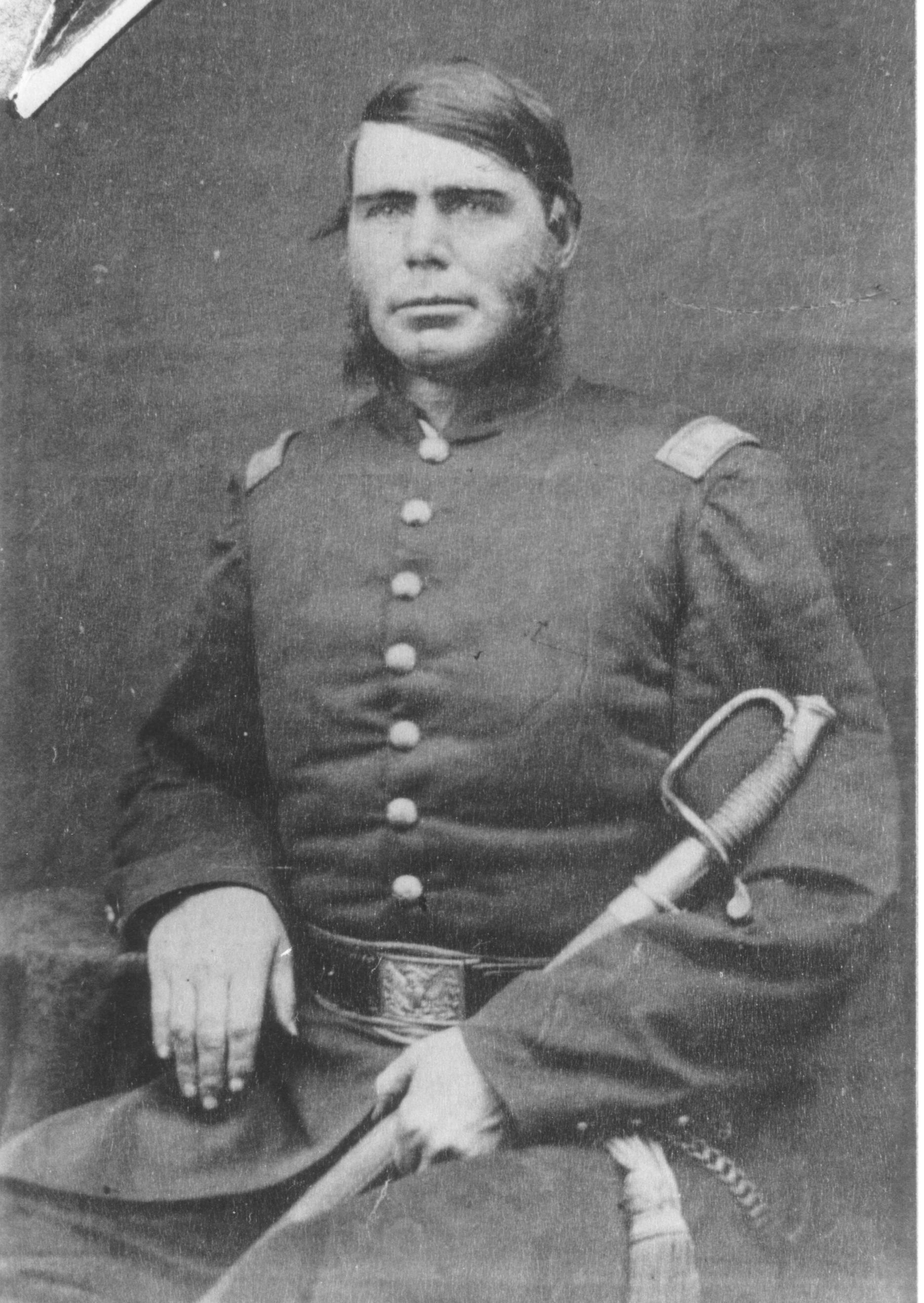
Colonel Colvill when he was a captain

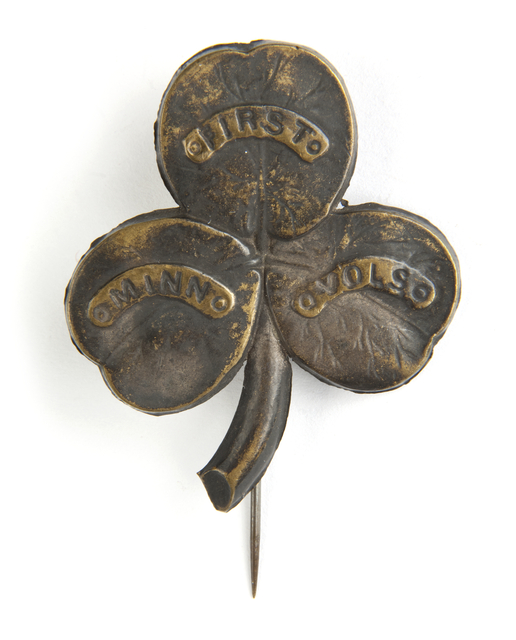
Plain brass First Minnesota Volunteer Infantry badge worn on the kepi. It was worn by Sergeant Chesley Billings Tirrell of Company C. The officer's version was nickel-plated. The trefoil was the Corps emblem of the II Corps that the 1st Minn. was attached to. (Minnesota Historical Society)

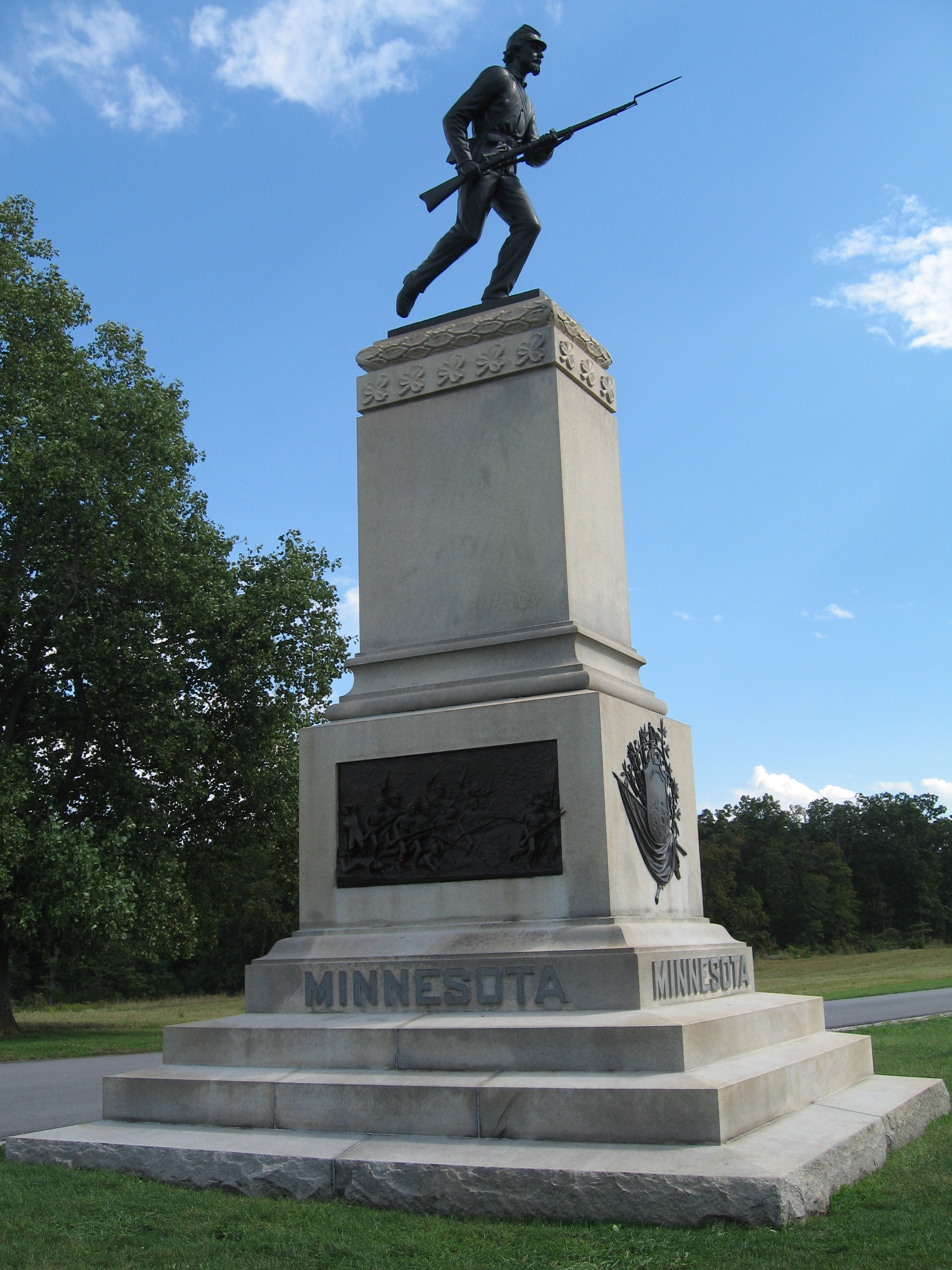
Monument to the 1st Minnesota Infantry Regiment at Gettysburg Battlefield, Gettysburg, Pennsylvania, located on Cemetery Ridge, off South Hancock Avenue

=== First Bull Run ===
On July 21, 1861, near Manassas, Virginia, the regiment fought in the first major battle of the American Civil War, the First Battle of Bull Run. Holding Rickett's Battery in support, the regiment saw heavy fighting on Henry House Hill in proximity to the enemy. The 1st Minnesota suffered heavy casualties: 49 killed, 107 wounded, and 34 missing.

Of the 1st Minnesota Infantry's initiation to combat, Colonel Franklin wrote:

The First Minnesota Regiment moved from its position on the left of the field to the support of Ricketts' battery, and gallantly engaged the enemy at that point. It was so near the enemy's lines that friends and foes were for a time confounded. The regiment behaved exceedingly well and finally retired from the field in good order. The other two regiments of the brigade retired in confusion, and no efforts of mine or staff were successful in rallying them. I respectfully refer you to Colonel Gorman's report for the account of his regiment's behavior and of the good conduct of his officers and men.

=== Antietam ===
During General John Sedgwick's ill-fated assault on the West Woods, the regiment suffered significant casualties (1 officer killed, 3 officers wounded, 15 enlisted killed, 79 enlisted wounded, 24 enlisted missing, for a total of 122 casualties [28%] of 435 engaged) as Union forces were routed on that part of the field. The brigade commander noted, "The First Minnesota Regiment fired with so much coolness and accuracy that they brought down [three times one] of the enemy's flags, and finally cut the flag-staff in two."

=== Gettysburg ===
==== July 2 ====
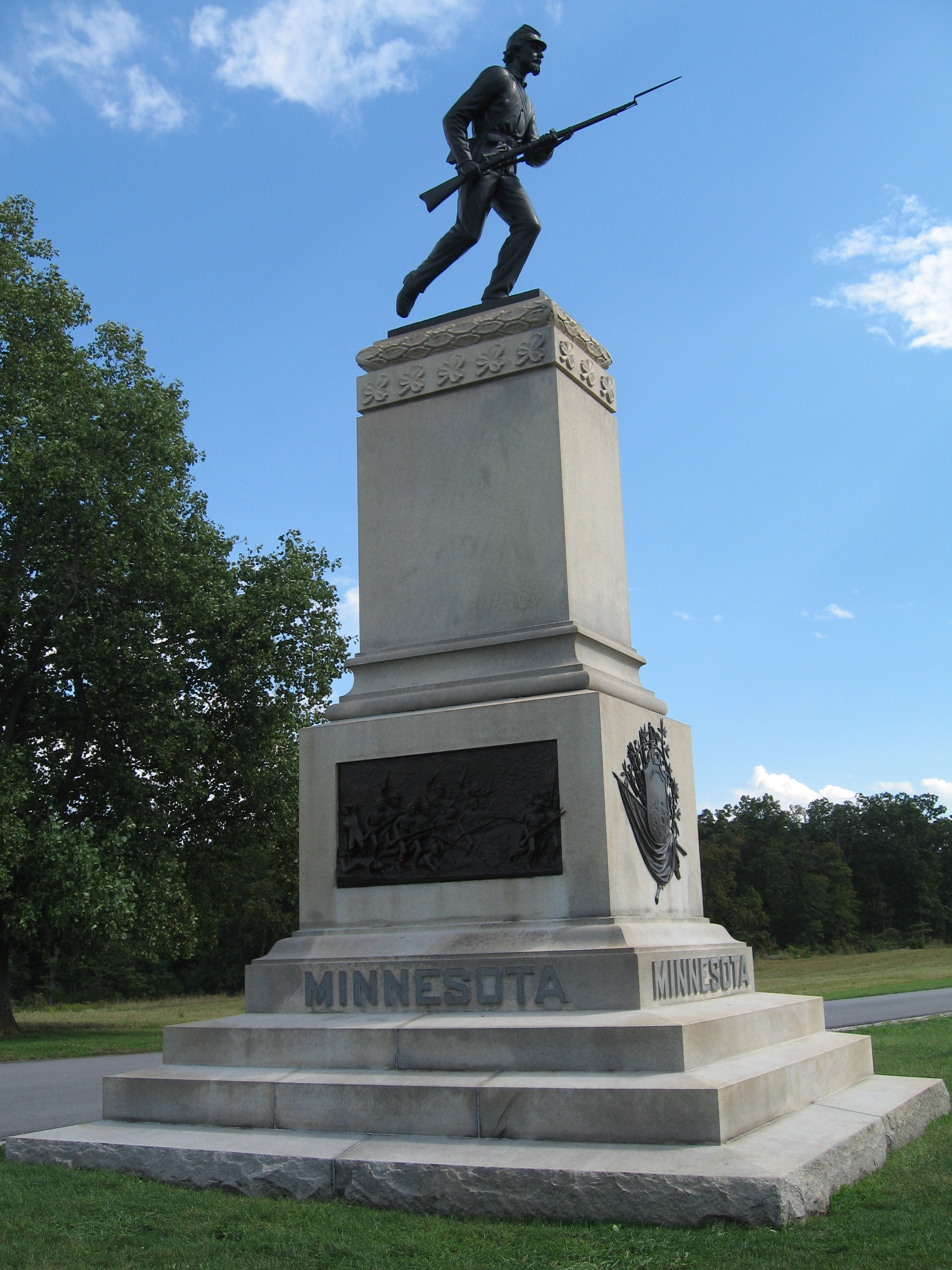
1st Minnesota Infantry Monument at Gettysburg Battlefield, Gettysburg, Pennsylvania, located on Cemetery Ridge, off South Hancock Avenue.

One of the regiment's most famous actions occurred during the second day of fighting at the Battle of Gettysburg. On that day, Major General Winfield Scott Hancock ordered the regiment, composed of roughly 250 men, to charge into Cadmus M. Wilcox's Alabama Brigade, part of Richard H. Anderson's Division, Third Corps, Army of Northern Virginia. Although the regiment was outnumbered by a ratio of at least 5 to 1, charging was Hancock's only opportunity to buy time for Union reinforcements to arrive. One survivor stated afterward that he expected the advance to result in "death or wounds to us all." During the charge, 215 (Note: The 215 casualty figure is disputed. Morning muster on July 2 for companies A, B, D, E, G, H, I & K, involved in the assault, was 262 with the evening muster 47. To arrive at the casualty figure of 215, the Regimental Historian (Lt. Wm. Lochren) subtracted the muster figures (262-47=215)(82.1%) and asserted that "[every one of the] 215 [missing men] lay upon the field." Conducting an enumeration by individual names in 1982, Robert W. Meinhard of Winona State University accounted for only 179 (68.3%) casualties for the single day of July 2, 1863. Whether Meinhard's and Lochren's conclusions are based upon the same records is unknown; accounting for the disputed 36 (=215-179) men remains unresolved.) of the 262 who made the charge became casualties within five minutes (47 killed, 121 wounded, 47 missing). That included the unit commander, Col. William Colvill, and all but three of his captains. All field commanders died in the assault. This action blunted the Confederate attack and helped preserve the Union's position on Cemetery Ridge at the end of the second day of the battle.

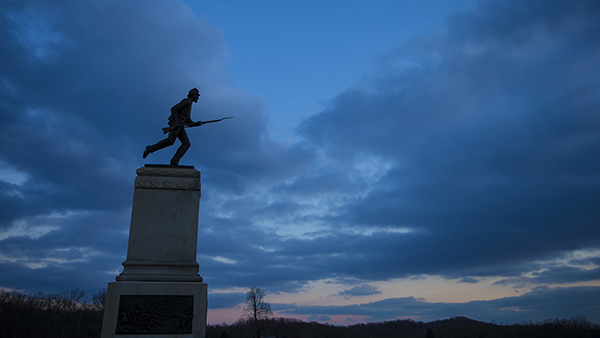
Gettysburg Battlefield 1st Minnesota Infantry Regiment Monument.

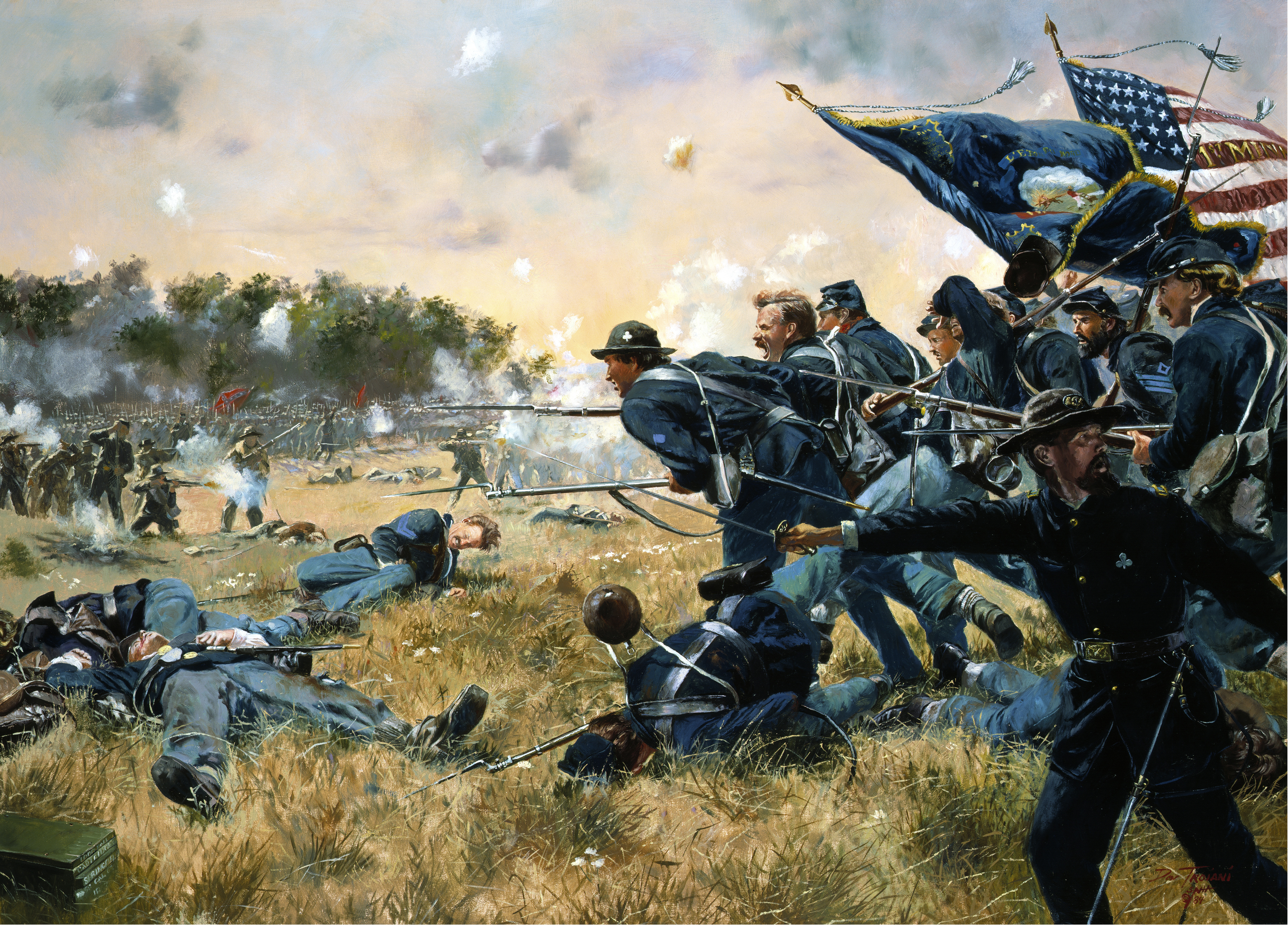
The bayonet charge by the 1st Minnesota regiment against a Confederate brigade on July 2, 1863

The 1st Minnesota's flag lost five flag bearers, each man dropping his weapon to carry it on. The 47 survivors rallied back to General Hancock under the command of their senior surviving officer, Captain Nathan S. Messick. The 1st Minnesota's 82% casualty rate stands as the second-largest loss by any surviving U.S. military unit in a single day's engagement.

In his official report, Confederate Brigadier General Cadmus M. Wilcox perceived the inequality of the fight differently (bold emphasis likely refers to the First Minnesota):

This stronghold of the enemy [i.e., Cemetery Ridge], together with his batteries, were almost won, when still another line of infantry descended the slope in our front at a double-quick, to the support of their fleeing comrades and for the defense of the batteries. Seeing this contest so unequal, I dispatched my adjutant-general to the division commander, to ask that support be sent to my men, but no support came. Three several times did this last of the enemy's lines attempt to drive my men back, and were as often repulsed. This struggle at the foot of the hill on which were the enemy's batteries, though so unequal, was continued for some thirty minutes. With a second supporting line, the heights could have been carried. Without support on either my right or left, my men were withdrawn, to prevent their entire destruction or capture. The enemy did not pursue, but my men retired under a heavy artillery fire, and returned to their original position in line, and bivouacked for the night, pickets being left on the pike.

==== July 3 ====
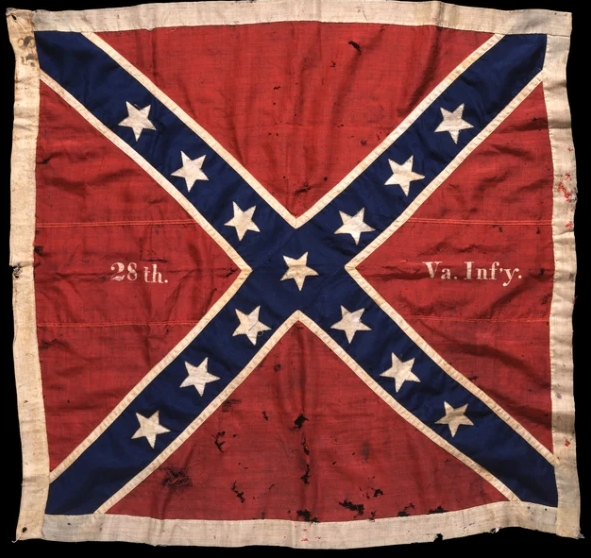
28th Virginia Colors taken by St. Paulite. Private Marshall Sherman of Company C.

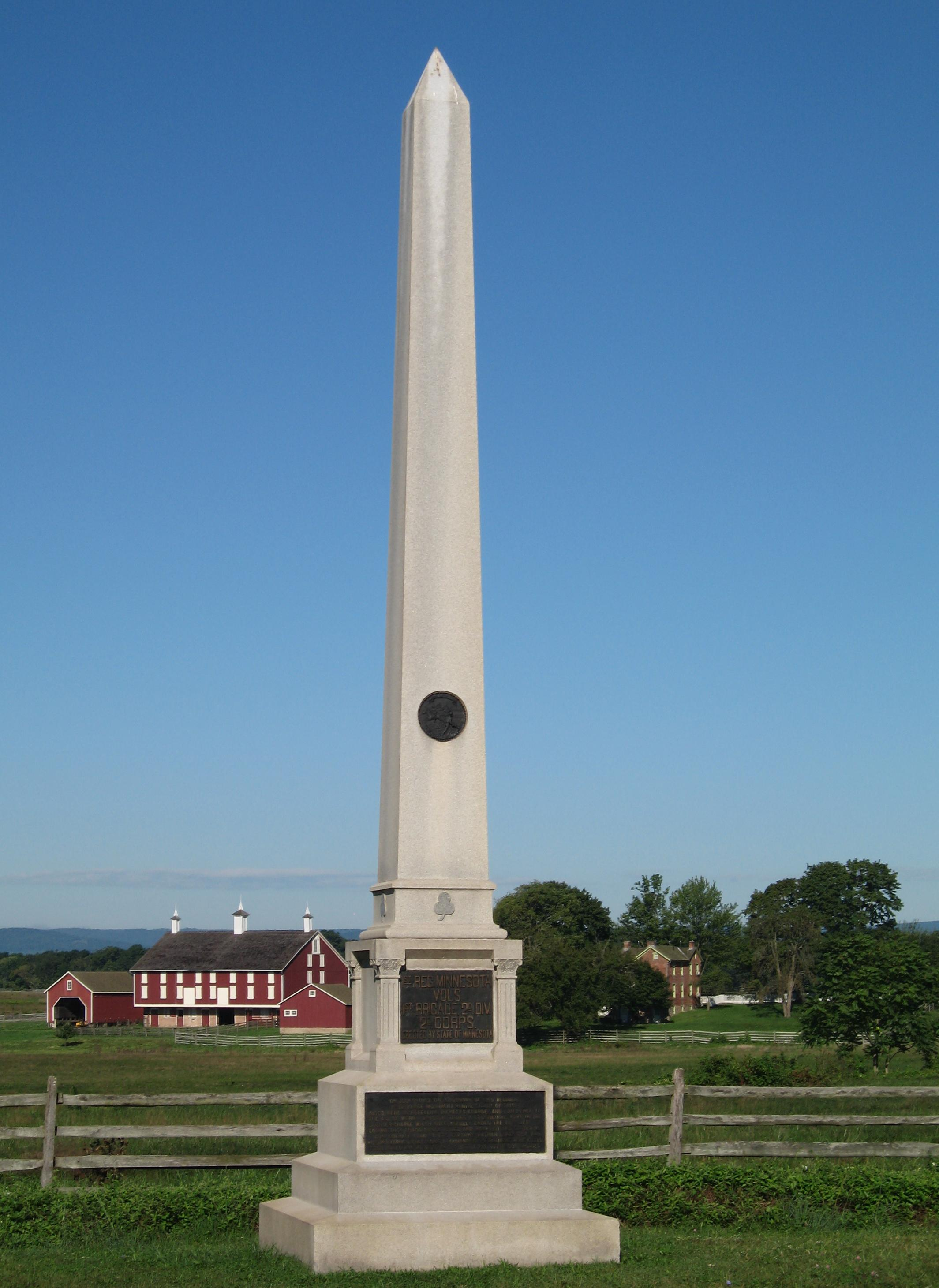
July 3 Monument to the 1st Minn. Reg., the Codori farmstead behind

After sustaining heavy losses from the previous day's fighting, the remaining men of the 1st Minnesota were reinforced by detached Companies C and F. The reunited regiment was moved slightly north of the previous day's fight to one of the few places where Union lines were breached during Pickett's Charge. They again had to charge into advancing Confederate troops with more losses. Capt. Messick was killed and Capt. W. B. Farrell was mortally wounded, and Capt. Henry C. Coates had to take command. During this charge, Private Marshall Sherman of Company C captured the colors of the 28th Virginia Infantry and received the Medal of Honor for this exploit. The Confederate flag was taken back to Minnesota as a war trophy, where it remains.

After being knocked out by a bullet to the head and later shot in the hand, Corporal Henry D. O'Brien repeatedly picked up the fallen colors of the 1st Minnesota and carried a wounded soldier back to the Union lines. He was also awarded the Medal of Honor for his actions.

=== Later service ===
The 1st Minnesota continued to serve in the Army of the Potomac. In 1863, it participated in the Bristoe and Mine Run campaigns. The 1st Minnesota mustered at Fort Snelling on April 29, 1864. Many soldiers continued service as the 1st Minnesota Infantry Battalion and went on to fight in the Appomattox Campaign. On May 23–24, 1865, the 1st Minnesota Battalion marched in the Grand Review of the Armies in Washington, D.C. In July 1865, the 1st Minnesota Battalion moved to Louisville, Kentucky for duty. It was mustered out of service upon completion of its enlistment on July 15, 1865.

=== Postwar ===
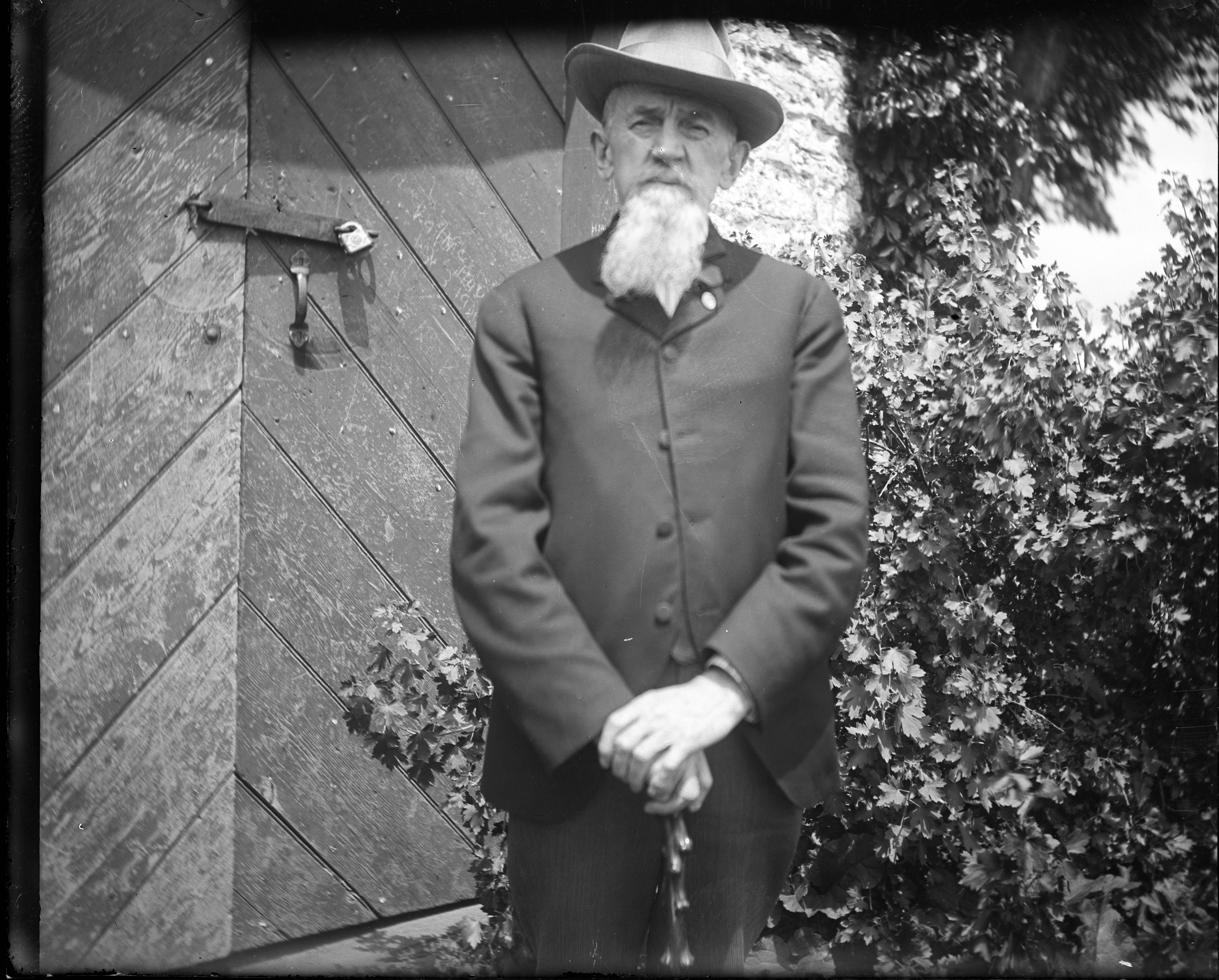
Sergeant George F. Mortimer, who was born at Fort Snelling, served as a corporal in Companies A and C in the 1st Minnesota Infantry Regiment during the American Civil War.

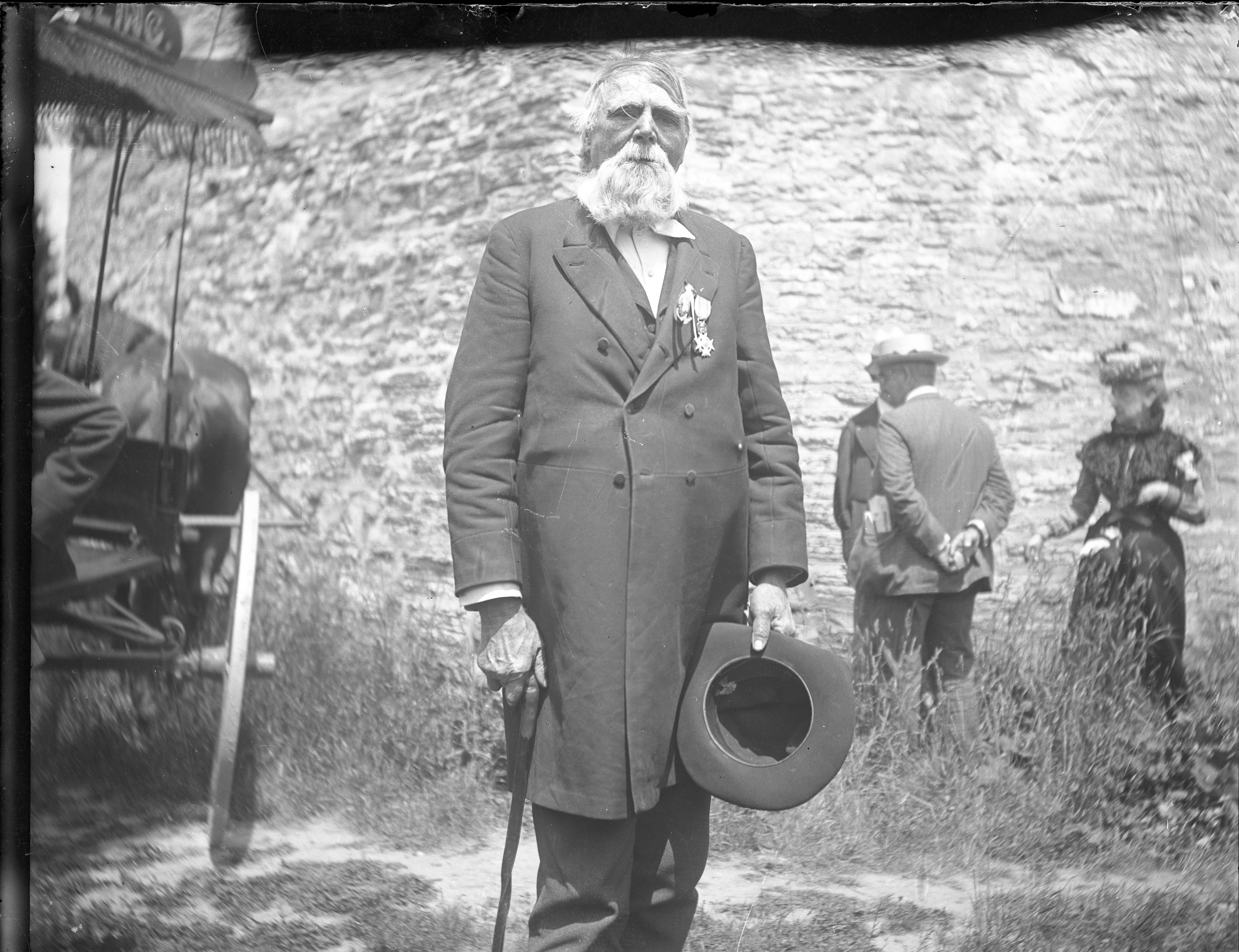
Brigadier General William J. Colvill at a reunion at Fort Snelling.

Postwar, both General Hancock and U.S. President Calvin Coolidge praised the actions of the 1st Minnesota. Gen. Hancock, who witnessed the action firsthand, placed its heroism highest in the annals of war: "No soldiers on any field, in this or any other country ever displayed grander heroism." Gen. Hancock ascribed unsurpassed gallantry to the famed assault stating: "There is no more gallant deed recorded in history." Emphasizing the critical nature of the circumstances on July 2 at Gettysburg, President Coolidge considered: "Colonel Colvill and those eight companies of the First Minnesota are entitled to rank as the saviors of their country."

Minnesota has two monuments at the Gettysburg National Military Park, including the 1st Minnesota Infantry Monument. One of the monuments bears the inscription:

On the afternoon of July 2, 1863 Sickles' Third Corps, having advanced from this line to the Emmitsburg Road, eight companies of the First Minnesota Regiment, numbering 262 men were sent to this place to support a battery upon Sickles repulse.

As his men were passing here in confused retreat, two Confederate brigades in pursuit were crossing the swale. To gain time to bring up the reserves & save this position, Gen Hancock in person ordered the eight companies to charge the rapidly advancing enemy.

The order was instantly repeated by Col. William Colvill. And the charge was instantly made down the slope at full speed through the concentrated fire of the two brigades breaking with the bayonet the enemy's front line as it was crossing the small brook in the low ground there the remnant of the eight companies, nearly surrounded by the enemy held its entire force at bay for a considerable time & till it retired on the approach of the reserve the charge successfully accomplished its object. It saved this position & probably the battlefield. The loss of the eight companies in the charge was 215 killed and wounded, more than 83% percent. 47 men were still in line & no man missing. In self-sacrificing desperate valor this charge has no parallel in any war. Among the severely wounded were Col. Wm Colvill, Lt Col. Chas P Adams & Maj. Mark W. Downie. Among the killed Capt. Joseph Periam, Capt. Louis Muller & Lt Waldo Farrar. The next day the regiment participated in repelling Pickett's charge losing 17 more men killed & wounded.

== Commanders ==
- Colonel Willis A. Gorman: April 29, 1861–October 1, 1861.
- Colonel Napoleon J. T. Dana: October 2, 1861–February 3, 1862.
- Colonel Alfred Sully: February 3, 1862–September 26, 1862.
- Colonel George N. Morgan: September 26, 1862–May 5, 1863 (resigned).
- Colonel William J. Colvill: May 5, 1863–May 4, 1864.
- Captain Henry C. Coates (acting commander): July 2, 1863–October, 1863. Coates was temporarily in command of the regiment due to much of the staff officers, including Colonel Colvill, Lt. Colonel Charles Powell Adams, Major Mark W. Downie, and Adjutant John Peller all being wounded during their charge during the second day at Gettysburg. Coates commanded the regiment for a total of 3 months after Gettysburg. Coates mustered out with the rest of the regiment on May 4, 1864.

== Notable people ==
- Samuel Bloomer - Originally assigned to Company B, Bloomer became the regiment's Colour sergeant. Bloomer's leg was shot during the Battle of Antietam while carrying the flag and later had to be amputated. After the war Bloomer became heavily involved in the Grand Army of the Republic.
- Henry D. O'Brien - Served in Company E of the 1st Minnesota. O'Brien was awarded the Medal of Honor for his actions at the Battle of Gettysburg.
- Josias R. King - Often credited as being the first to volunteer for the Union Army in the country.
- Marshall Sherman - Was credited with capturing the 28th Virginia battle flag during the Battle of Gettysburg.
- Charles Powell Adams - Adams was originally the Captain of Company H when the regiment was mustered in 1861. Adams was later promoted to the rank of Major on September 26, 1862 following the Battle of Antietam. After being wounded at Gettysburg, Adams was reassigned to command Hatch's Minnesota Cavalry Battalion.
- Stephen Miller - Originally served as the regiment's Lieutenant Colonel before being promoted to command the 7th Minnesota Infantry Regiment.
- Minor T. Thomas - Served in Company B as a 2nd Lieutenant before being promoted to the rank of Lieutenant Colonel and being reassigned to the 4th Minnesota Infantry Regiment. Minor later commanded the 8th Minnesota Infantry Regiment and was eventually promoted to the rank of Brigadier General and commanded the 3rd Brigade, 1st Division, XXIII Corps.
- Al Sieber - A German American immigrant, volunteered for service with the 1st Minnesota and was assigned to Company B. Sieber later served in the 6th Cavalry Regiment during the Apache Wars and commanded and trained the Apache Scouts.
- Edward Duffield Neill - Served in the 1st Minnesota Volunteers as the regimental chaplain from 1861 to 1862 and as a hospital chaplain from 1862 to 1863.

== Casualties ==
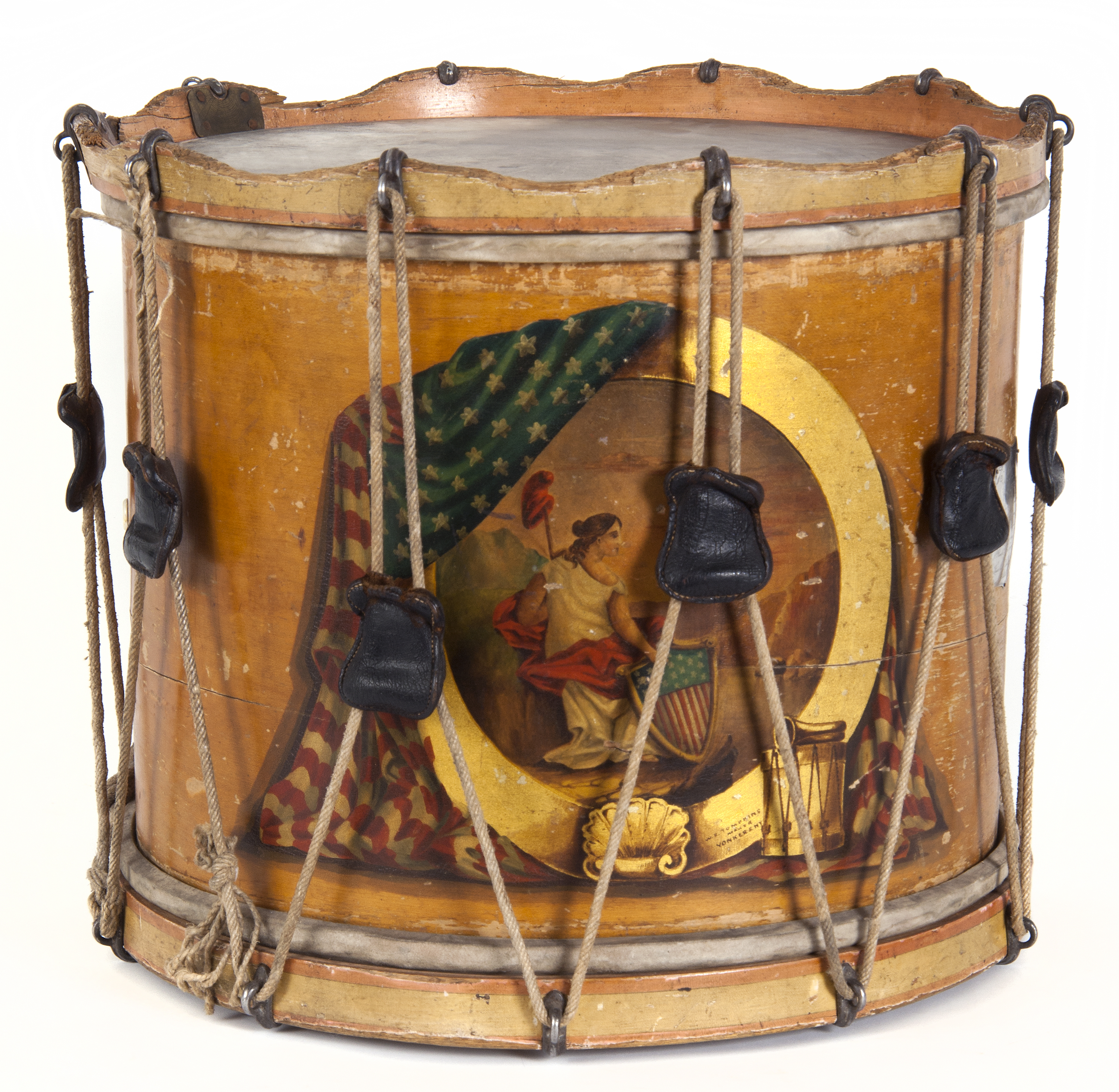
First Minnesota Civil War drum, 1861

The 1st Minnesota Infantry Regiment suffered the loss of 10 officers and 177 enlisted men killed in action or who later died of their wounds, plus another 2 officers and 97 enlisted men who died of disease, for a total of 286 fatalities and 609 wounded.

== Continued lineage ==
The 2nd Battalion, 135th Infantry Regiment, 34th Infantry Division (Minnesota Army National Guard) trace their roots back to the 1st Minnesota Volunteers.

== See also ==
- List of Minnesota Civil War Units
- 28th Virginia Colors
