= Gordon E. Cole =

American politician (1833–1890)

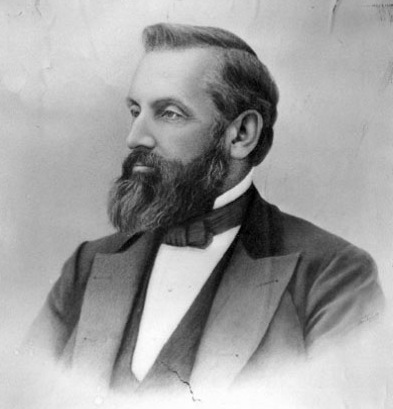

2nd Minnesota Attorney General
- In office 1860–1866
- Governor: Alexander Ramsey; Henry A. Swift; Stephen Miller
- Preceded by: Charles H. Berry
- Succeeded by: William J. Colvill

Member of the Minnesota House of Representatives
- In office 1882

Member of the Minnesota Senate from the 8th district
- In office January 1866 – January 7, 1867
- Preceded by: Levi Nutting
- Succeeded by: Oscar F. Perkins

Personal details
- Born: June 18, 1833 Cheshire, Massachusetts
- Died: October 4, 1890 (aged 57) London
- Party: Republican

Gordon Earl Cole (June 18, 1833 – October 4, 1890) was a lawyer and Republican politician who served as Minnesota Attorney General from 1860 to 1866.

== Early life and education ==
Cole was born in Cheshire, Massachusetts in 1833. He attended Suffield Academy and later studied law at several different schools and law offices in New York including under George N. Briggs. He graduated from Harvard Law School in 1854 and opened a law practice in his hometown of Cheshire shortly thereafter.

== Career in Minnesota ==
In 1855, he married Stella C. Whipple. The two relocated to Minnesota Territory a year later, settling in Faribault, Minnesota. Cole pursued his legal career, living in Faribault and occasionally traveling to Minneapolis and St. Paul for trials. In Fairbault, he had a law practice with John Higley Case. The partnership later dissolved. He developed a specialty working with cases related to railroads and government land grants.

Cole was also involved in the state's Republican politics. He served three terms as Minnesota Attorney General from 1860 to 1866 and two terms in the Minnesota State Legislature, winning election to the Minnesota Senate in 1864 and to the Minnesota House of Representatives in 1882. He also served on a variety of state agencies and boards and as mayor of Faribault for a single term. In 1879, he was a primary contender for the Republican nomination for governor. In 1884, he ran unsuccessfully against Dwight M. Sabin for United States Senate.

== Death ==
Cole became ill in 1890 and traveled to Europe with his daughter to seek medical treatment in Germany. He died in London while en route on October 4, 1890.

== Notes ==
Legal offices
Preceded by Charles H. Berry	Minnesota Attorney General; 1860–1866	Succeeded by William J. Colvill
