= Henry D. O'Brien =

American soldier

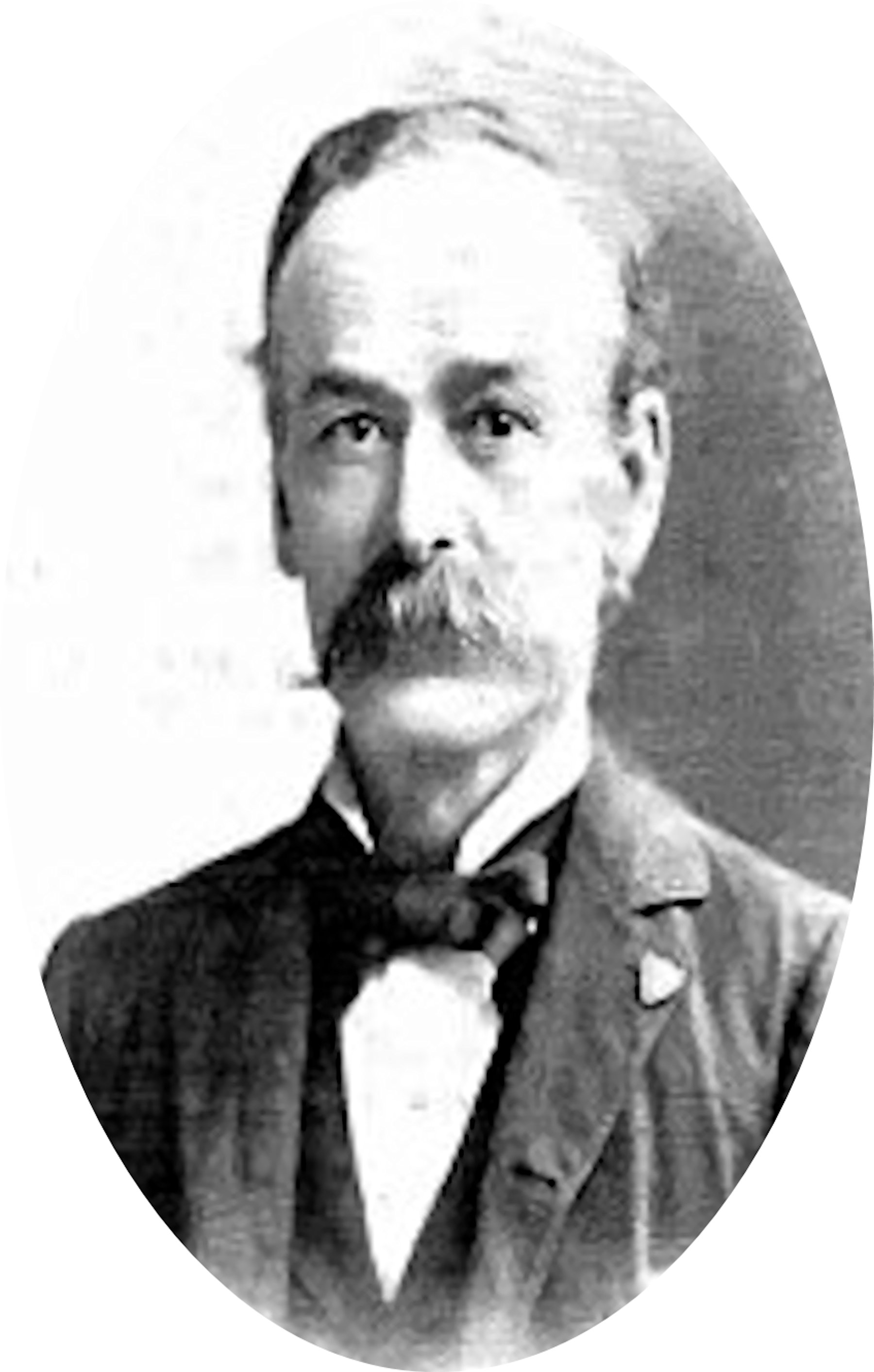
- Born: January 21, 1842; Calais, Maine
- Died: November 1, 1902 (aged 60); St. Louis, Missouri
- Burial place: Bellefontaine Cemetery
- Spouse: Emma Sinclair
- Military career
- Allegiance: United States of America
- Branch: United States Army
- Rank: Major
- Units: Company E, 1st Minnesota Infantry
- Conflicts: Battle of Gettysburg; American Civil War
- Awards: Medal of Honor

Henry D. O'Brien (January 21, 1842 – November 1, 1902) was an American soldier who fought with the Union Army in the American Civil War. O'Brien received his country's highest award for bravery during combat, the Medal of Honor, for actions taken on July 3, 1863, during the Battle of Gettysburg.

== Biography ==
O'Brien was born in Calais, Maine in 1842. His family moved to Saint Anthony Falls, Minnesota in 1857. He enlisted in the 1st Minnesota Infantry, Company E, as a private on August 13, 1861. With this regiment, O'Brien saw combat in multiple engagements, including the Battle of Ball's Bluff, the Battle of Harpers Ferry, the Siege of Yorktown (1862), the Battle of Malvern Hill, and many others. He was also involved with the Battle of Gettysburg from July 2 to 3, 1863. On the second day, O'Brien helped rescue a fallen soldier and brought him back to safety. On July 3, during Pickett's Charge, O'Brien took up the colors of his regiment when the initial color-bearer was shot down, and in doing so received two wounds in a bayonet charge that followed to bring the flag back to safety. He received the Medal of Honor for these actions.

Following Gettysburg, O'Brien fought at the Second Battle of Deep Bottom where he was shot in the right shoulder and lung. The shot passed through his body cleanly, but the wound festered for nineteen years before a surgeon removed twenty-two pieces of bone and bullet fragment from the area.

== Medal of Honor citation ==
The President of the United States of America, in the name of Congress, takes pleasure in presenting the Medal of Honor to Corporal Henry D. O'Brien, United States Army, for extraordinary heroism on 3 July 1863, while serving with Company E, 1st Minnesota Infantry, in action at Gettysburg, Pennsylvania. Taking up the colors where they had fallen, Corporal O'Brien rushed ahead of his regiment, close to the muzzles of the enemy's guns, and engaged in the desperate struggle in which the enemy was defeated, and though severely wounded, he held the colors until wounded a second time.

== Personal life ==
After the war, O'Brien married Emma Sinclair with whom they had one son. O'Brien worked as a government pension agent in St. Louis, where he lived for the rest of his life.

O'Brien died of pneumonia in St. Louis, Missouri, at the age of 60.
