= William J. Colvill =

American politician and soldier (1830–1905)

Brigadier General William J. Colvill Jr.
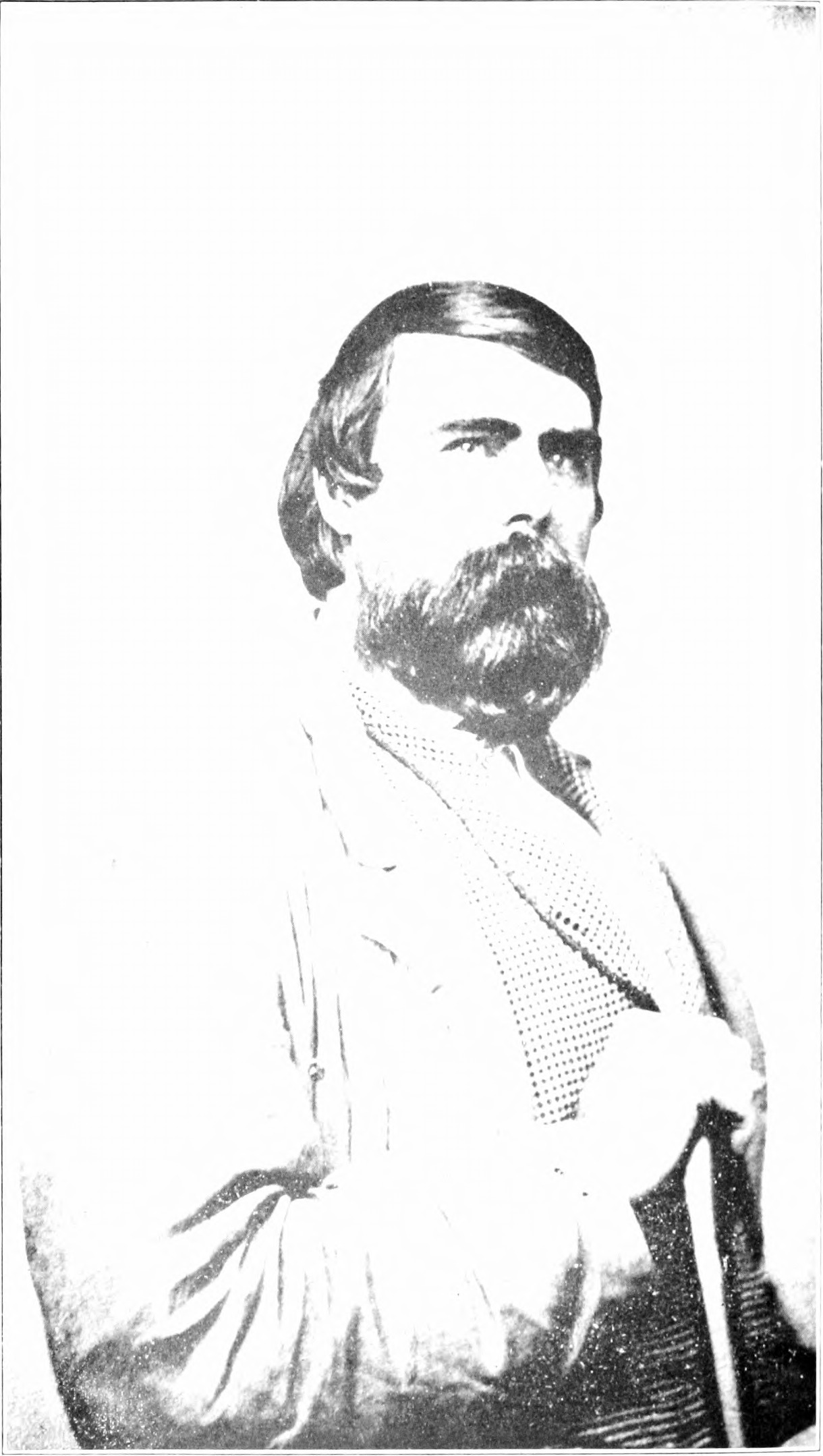
- Colonel William Colvill c.1865.

3rd Minnesota Attorney General
- In office 1866–1868
- Governor: William R. Marshall
- Preceded by: Gordon E. Cole
- Succeeded by: Francis R. E. Cornell

Member of the Minnesota Legislature from District 9 and District 16

Personal details
- Born: April 5, 1830 Forestville, New York
- Died: June 12, 1905 (aged 75) Minneapolis, Minnesota
- Occupation: Lawyer and Register of the Duluth Land Office
- Profession: Law

Military service
- Allegiance: Union Army
- Branch/service: United States Army
- Years of service: 1861-1865
- Rank: Colonel Brevet Brigadier General
- Unit: 1st Minnesota Volunteer Infantry Regiment
- Commands: 1st Minnesota Volunteer Infantry Regiment; 1st Minnesota Heavy Artillery Regiment

William J. Colvill Jr. (April 5, 1830 – June 12, 1905) was an American Union colonel in the American Civil War who led the 1st Minnesota Volunteer Infantry in the Battle of Gettysburg. He was Minnesota Attorney General from 1866 to 1868 and he also served in the Minnesota House of Representatives.

== Early life ==
Colvill was born in Forestville, New York, on April 5, 1830, to Irish and Scotch parents. He was graduated from the Fredonia Academy and taught a country school for one year. He studied law at Forestville and Buffalo, where he read law in the office of Millard Fillmore. He was admitted to the bar in 1851. He practiced law in Forestville about three years and, in 1854, migrated to Minnesota. He spent the first year, or more, in St. Paul, during which time he was, first, enrolling clerk and then secretary of the Territorial Council. He then moved to Cannon Falls and took a tract of land upon which part of the city now stands. He opened a law office in Red Wing in 1854 and in 1855 established The Red Wing Sentinel, a Democratic newspaper. His papers were always Democratic in politics, but always for the Union and against secession. Those who held such views before the war were known as Union Democrats and generally supported the policies of Stephen A. Douglas.

== Civil War ==
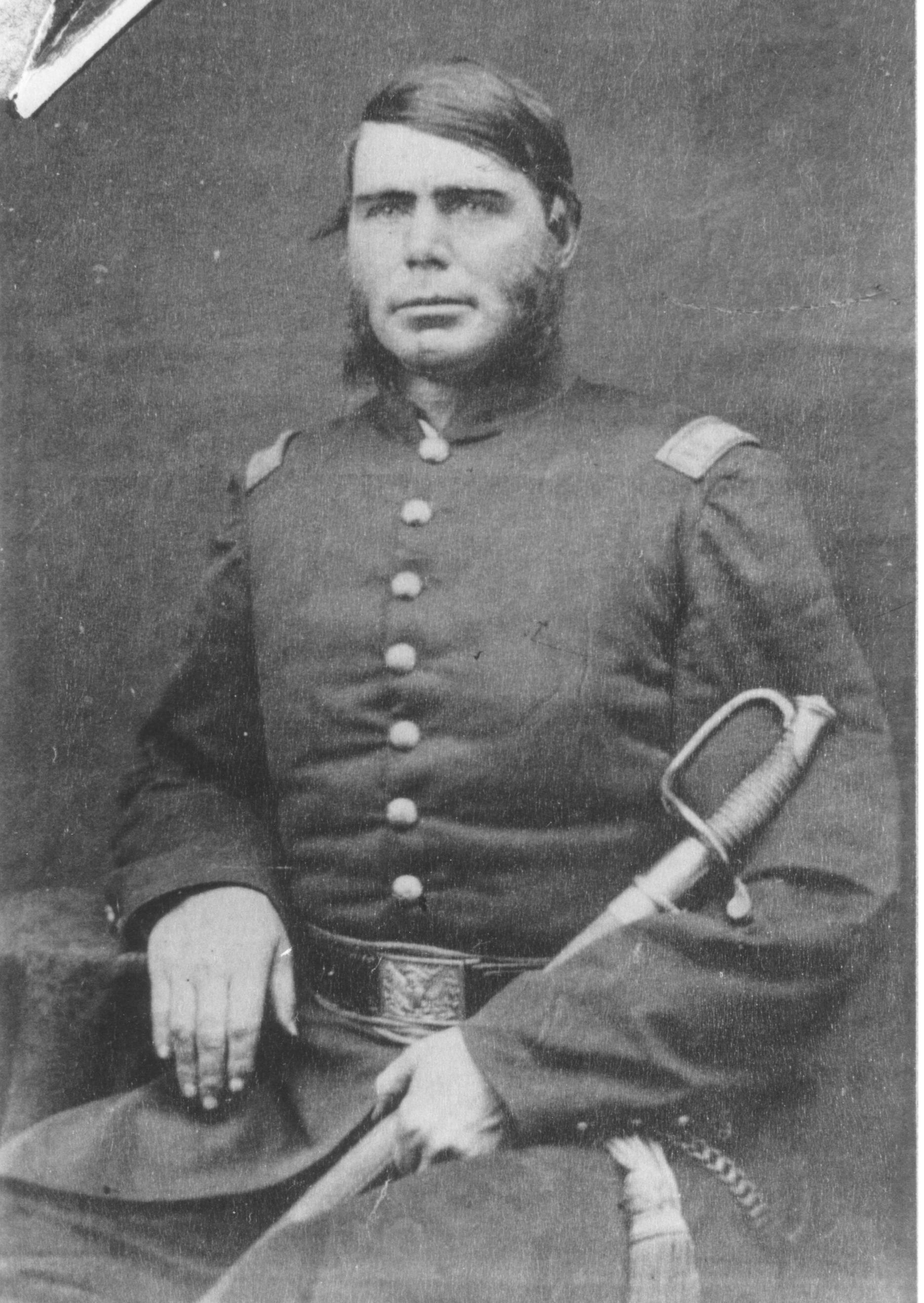
Captain William Colvill c.1860-1861. Courtesy of the Minnesota Historical Society.

When the Civil War broke out, the 31-year-old Colvill was the first man from Goodhue County to volunteer. The local men elected him captain of Company F, 1st Minnesota Volunteer Infantry Regiment. On June 26, 1861, the regiment arrived in Washington D.C.

=== First Bull Run ===
A month later, the regiment, with the Union Army, marched south into Virginia. On July 21, they met the Confederate Army outside Manassas, Virginia, at the First Battle of Bull Run. The regiment saw heavy fighting on Henry House Hill where they were ordered to support Rickett's Battery. The 1st Minnesota was one of the last regiments to leave the battlefield, and suffered the highest casualties of any northern regiment (48 killed, 83 wounded and 30 missing).

=== The Seven Days Battle ===
The Union Army, now under the command of General George B. McClellan, landed on the peninsula between the James River and York River, and marched west towards Richmond. The two armies fought a series of battles over a week known as the Seven Days Battle. On June 30, 1862, at the Battle of White Oak Swamp, Colvill received a bullet wound in the shoulder. He was sent to Baltimore where he spent the rest of the summer recuperating.

=== Antietam ===
Colvill returned to his unit on August 31. Shortly after he was promoted to major. On September 17, the unit, having a strength of 435 men, participated in the Battle of Antietam. The 1st Minnesota was on the extreme right of the leading brigade (commanded by the regiment's former colonel, Willis A. Gorman) as John Sedgwick's division ill-famed assault on the West Woods, resulting in a Union rout from that part of the field. Bursting through the far side of the woods, the column was exposed to heavy fire from both flanks. The unit suffered 15 killed, 79 wounded, and 21 missing. Shortly after the battle Colvill was promoted to lieutenant colonel.

=== Fredericksburg, Chancellorsville and Haymarket ===
On December 11, the 1st Minnesota was one of the units that captured the town of Fredericksburg, where they plundered the town in one of the more controversial acts in the war. Two days later, during the Battle of Fredericksburg, they were not sent in one of the many suicidal charges against Marye's Heights. The unit saw little action during the Battle of Chancellorsville. After the battle, General Joseph Hooker marched the Army of the Potomac north to counter General Robert E. Lee's invasion of Pennsylvania. On June 23, Colvill was promoted to colonel and commander of the regiment. Two days later, on June 25, the unit was attacked by General J. E. B. Stuart's cavalry at the Battle of Haymarket. During the battle while leading the regiment, Colvill's horse was shot from underneath him. On June 29, Colvill was arrested for allowing the men to cross a three-foot deep river on logs whereas the orders were to wade across. The march from Fredericksburg to Gettysburg would take 14 days, traveling 11 of those, averaging over 14 miles a day. By the time they reached the small town they were exhausted.

=== Gettysburg and afterwards ===
On July 2, 1863, the regiment was in reserve on Cemetery Ridge at Gettysburg. In the morning, Colvill had been relieved of arrest and resumed command of the regiment. Late in the afternoon, Confederate General Cadmus Wilcox's Alabama Brigade broke through the III Corps at the Wheatfield. Union II Corps commander General Winfield Scott Hancock, seeing the danger of the Union position being overrun on Cemetery Ridge, rode up to the Minnesota troops and asked Colvill, "My God! Are these all the men we have here? What regiment is this?" Colvill responded, "1st Minnesota, Sir!" Hancock's response was "Advance, Colonel, and take those colors!" Hancock knew that the charge was suicidal but hoped to delay the Confederates long enough to get reinforcements to the ridge. Wilcox had begun the day's fighting with some 1,800 men in his unit, although it is not known exactly how many were left at the time of the action with the 1st Minnesota. Without hesitation, Colvill ordered the charge against a brigade four to five times larger. Of the 262 Minnesotans who made the charge, 215 were killed or wounded. Despite the heavy losses, the Minnesotans were successful in slowing the Confederates until more regiments arrived. Among the wounded was Colvill who was hit three times and severely wounded, including being shot in the shoulder and the ankle. One bullet entered the top of his right shoulder and tore across his back, clipping off a part of his vertebra and lodging under his left scapula. The wounds forced Colvill to use a cane the rest of his life.

After the battle, Colvill recovered in a private home in Gettysburg at 303 Baltimore Street, at the corner of Baltimore and Breckenridge Streets. Being a very tall man at 6' 5", it was not easy fitting him into a bed. The surgeons at first wanted to amputate his foot, saying it was necessary in order to save his life, but Colvill would not allow it. From there he was sent to a hospital in Harrisburg, Pennsylvania, where he remained until February 1864. He was reunited with his regiment that month as they were being mustered out and sent home.

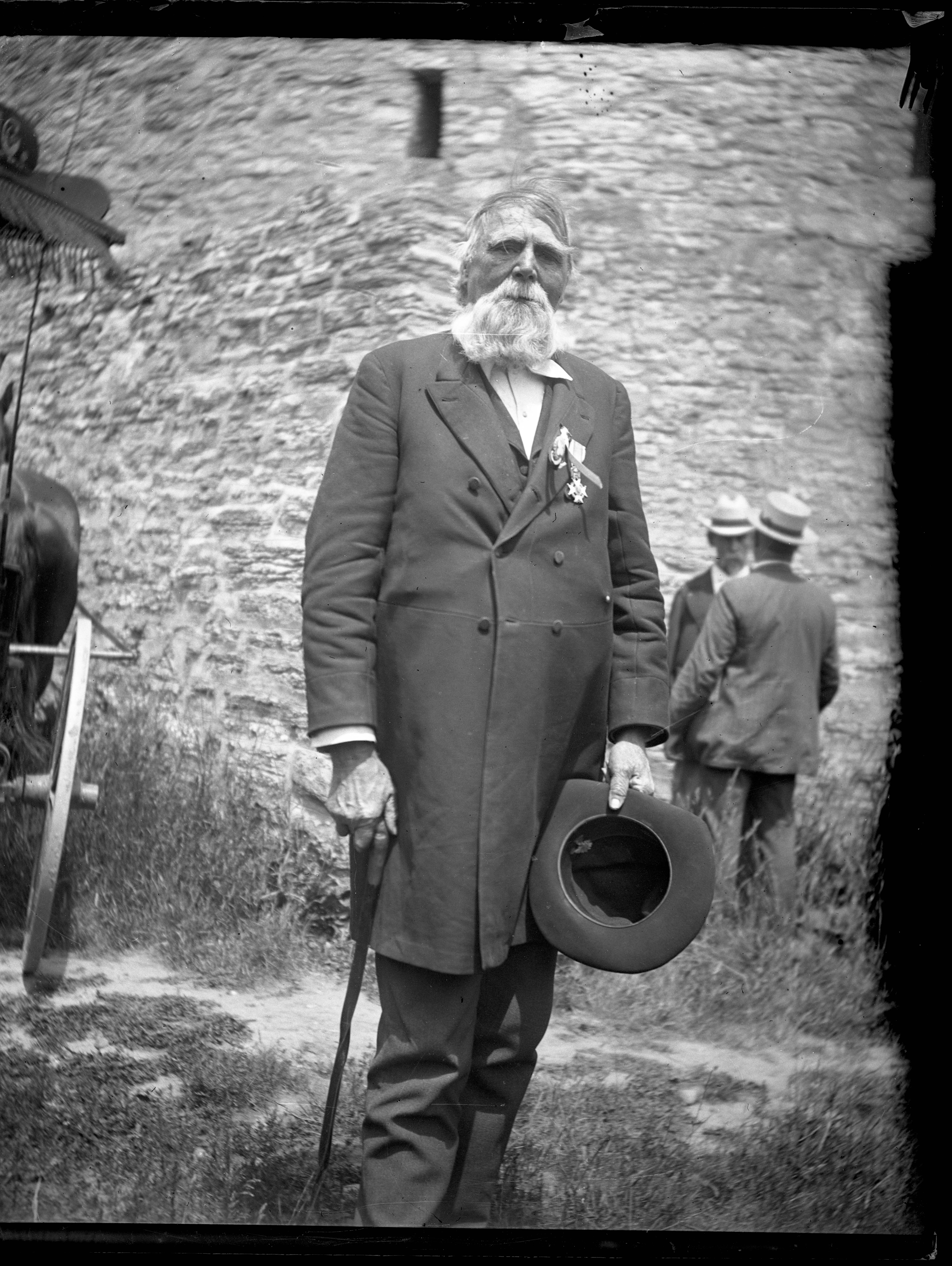
Colonel William Colvill at a Reunion at Fort Snelling c.1890-1900.

Back in Red Wing, Minnesota, he edited the Red Wing Republican newspaper. During this time, he was elected to the Minnesota State Legislature. He took his seat in January 1865. Immediately after the adjournment of the legislature, he received an appointment as colonel of the 1st Minnesota Heavy Artillery Regiment, which was stationed in Chattanooga. On May 6, 1865, he received a brevet commission as brigadier general and was mustered out of service in July 1865.

== Later life ==
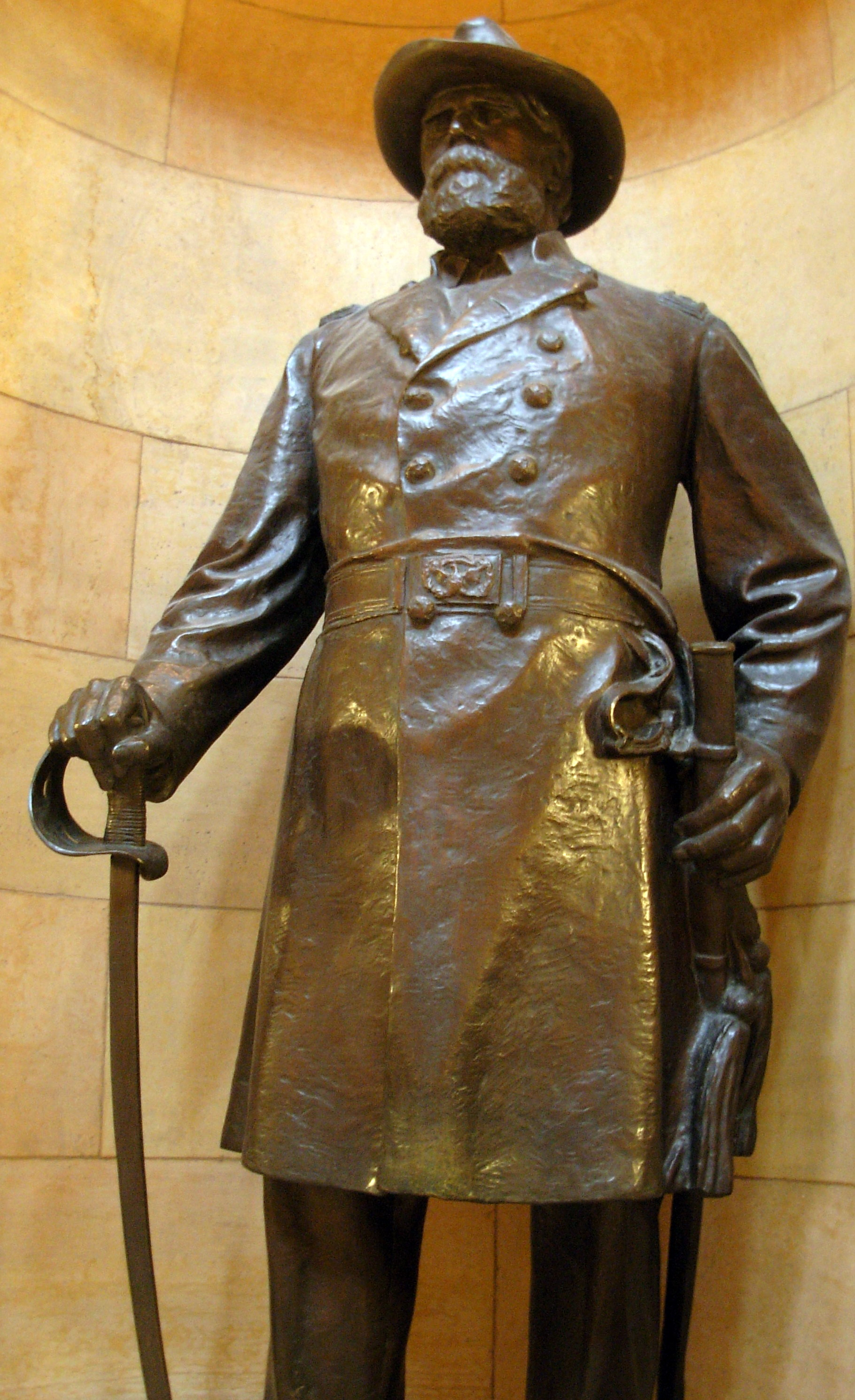
Colvill statue in the Minnesota State Capitol

After the war, he returned to the state legislature until 1866. He was then elected Minnesota Attorney General from 1866 to 1868. Then he returned to his law practice in Red Wing. He also served in the Minnesota House of Representatives in 1878. During the next decade, he served as register of the Duluth Land Office, from 1887 to 1891.

== Personal life ==
Colvill married Elizabeth Morgan (a direct descendant of Elder Brewster, one of the Pilgrim Fathers) of Oneida County, New York, in April, 1867. In 1893, Colvill had a 167-acre homestead in Grand Marais, Minnesota, next to Lake Superior. Others settled there creating a small community. It was named Covill in 1906 after his death.

In 1905, Colvill traveled to the Minnesota Soldiers' Home in Minneapolis to attend a reunion of the veterans of the First Minnesota. While there, he died in his sleep on June 13. He is buried in the Cannon Falls Community Cemetery in Cannon Falls, Minnesota. His original statue sits atop a shady hill where it overlooks the cemetery. In 1928, President Calvin Coolidge was present for the dedication of a statue that was placed next to his grave.

== Legacy ==
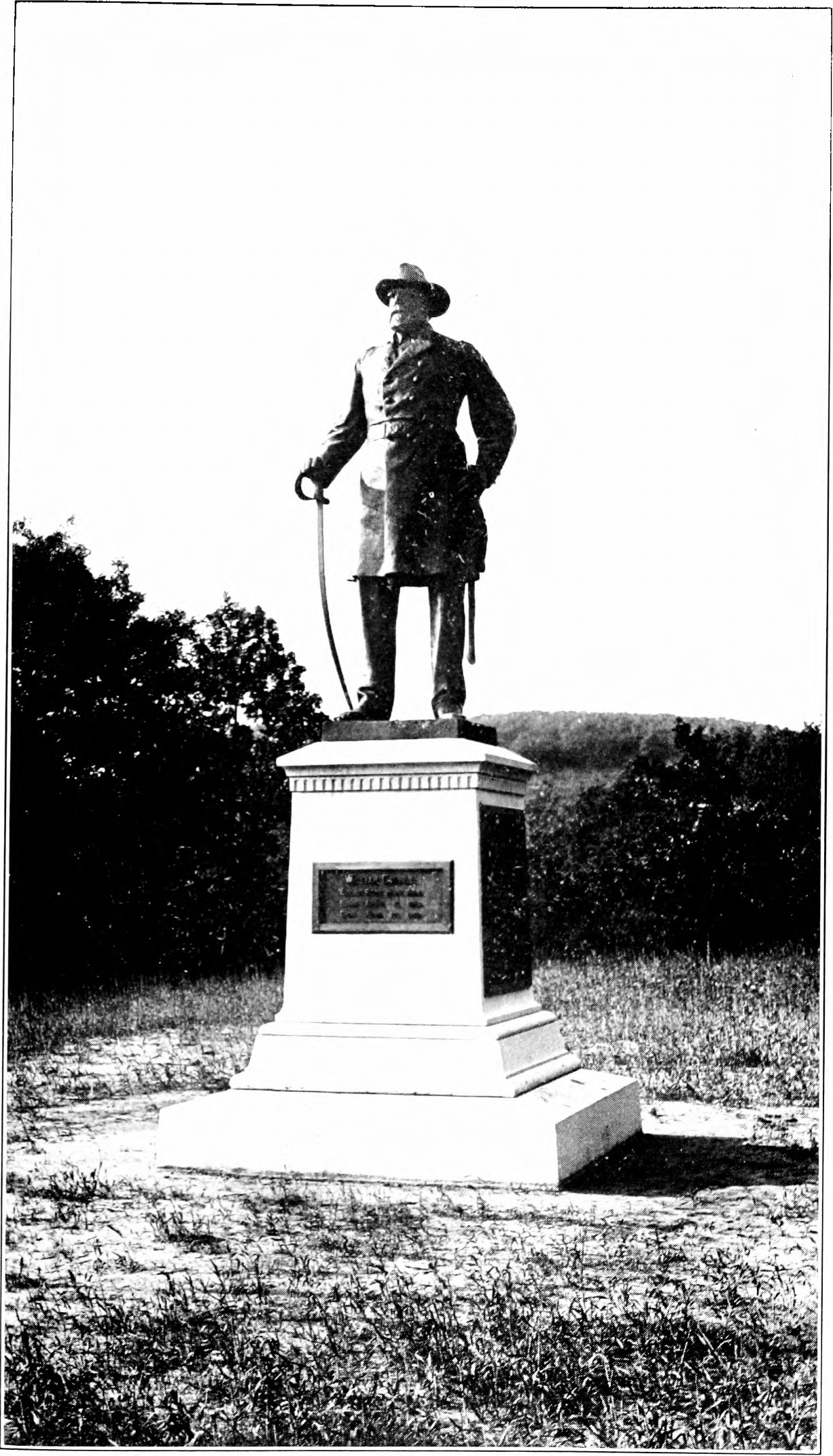
Statue of William Colvill located near his grave in Cannon Falls, Minnesota.

Colvill Park in Red Wing, Minnesota, is named for Colvill, and he is represented by another statue in the Minnesota State Capitol. In addition, a section of Minnesota State Highway 19 from Gaylord to Red Wing is named in his honor. The now extinct town of Colvill in Cook County was also named in his honor. A plaque at the wayside on Hwy 61 at the Kudunce River indicates that he had a summer home in the area.

== See also ==
- List of American Civil War brevet generals (Union)
- 1st Minnesota Infantry Regiment
- Minnesota in the American Civil War
- People from Red Wing, Minnesota

Legal offices
Preceded by Gordon E. Cole	Minnesota Attorney General; 1866–1868	Succeeded by Francis R. E. Cornell
