= 1922 Minnesota Attorney General election =

- November 7, 1922
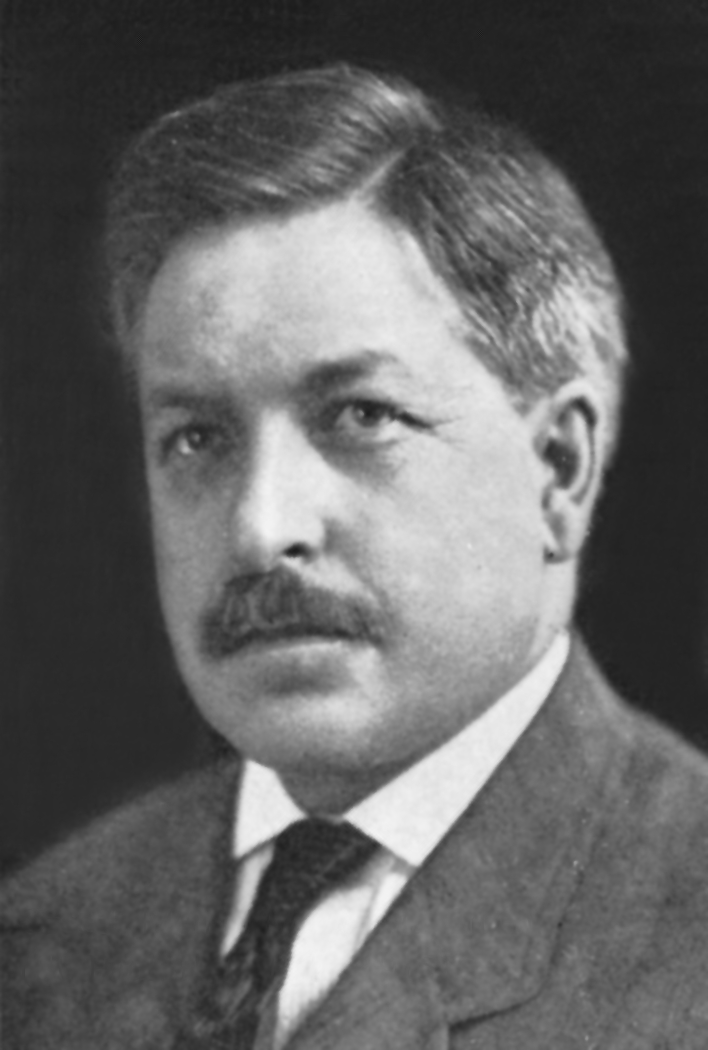

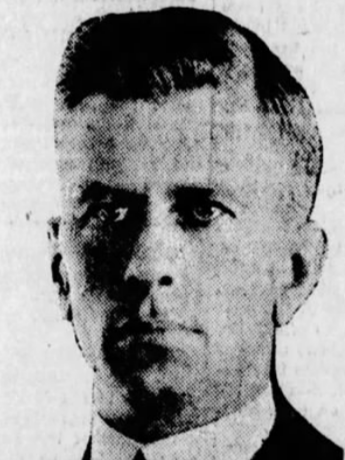

Nominee	Clifford L. Hilton	Roy C. Smelker	James E. Doran
Party	Republican	Farmer–Labor	Democratic
Popular vote	319,529	254,715	72,157
Percentage	49.43%	39.41%	11.16%
Attorney General before election
Clifford L. Hilton
Republican
Elected Attorney General
Clifford L. Hilton
Republican

The 1922 Minnesota Attorney General election was held on November 7, 1922, in order to elect the attorney general of Minnesota. Republican nominee and incumbent attorney general Clifford L. Hilton defeated Farmer–Labor nominee and former member of the Wisconsin State Assembly Roy C. Smelker and Democratic nominee James E. Doran.

== General election ==
On election day, November 7, 1922, Republican nominee Clifford L. Hilton won re-election by a margin of 64,814 votes against his foremost opponent Farmer–Labor nominee Roy C. Smelker, thereby retaining Republican control over the office of attorney general. Hilton was sworn in for his third full term on January 3, 1923.

=== Results ===
Minnesota Attorney General election, 1922
Party	Candidate	Votes	%
Republican	Clifford L. Hilton (incumbent)	319,529	49.43
Farmer–Labor	Roy C. Smelker	254,715	39.41
Democratic	James E. Doran	72,157	11.16
Total votes		646,401	100.00
Republican hold			
