= Minnesota Farmer–Labor Party =

Former American political party (1918–1944)

Farmer–Labor Party of Minnesota
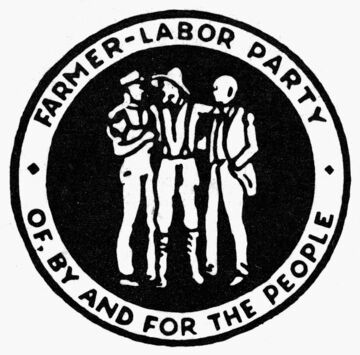
- Founded: 1918; 108 years ago
- Dissolved: 1944; 82 years ago
- Merger of: Nonpartisan League; Duluth Union Labor Party
- Succeeded by: Minnesota Democratic–Farmer–Labor Party
- Ideology: Co-operative commonwealth Left-wing populism Progressivism; Social democracy Laborism; Anti-capitalism; Anti-fascism; Factions: Socialism; Isolationism; Communism (From 1936)
- Political position: Left-wing
- National affiliation: None (1918–1919); Labor Party of the United States (1919–1920); Farmer–Labor Party of the United States (1920–1923); Federated Farmer–Labor Party (1923–1924); Farmer–Labor Party of the United States (1924–1936); None (1936–1944)

The Minnesota Farmer–Labor Party (FLP), officially known as the Farmer-Labor Party of Minnesota, was a left-wing American political party in Minnesota between 1918 and 1944. The FLP largely dominated Minnesota politics during the Great Depression. It was one of the most successful statewide third party movements in United States history and the longest-lasting and most fruitful affiliate of the national Farmer–Labor movement. At its height in the 1920s and 1930s, FLP members included three Minnesota governors, four United States senators, eight United States representatives and a majority in the Minnesota legislature.

In 1944, Hubert H. Humphrey and Elmer Benson worked to merge the party with the state's Democratic Party, forming the contemporary Minnesota Democratic–Farmer–Labor Party.

== History ==
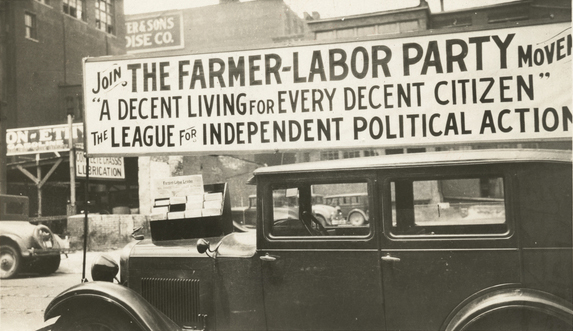
Minnesota Farmer-Labor Party political banner atop a car c. 1925

The Minnesota Farmer–Labor Party emerged from the Non-Partisan League (NPL), which had expanded from North Dakota into Minnesota in 1918, The beginning of the party in Minnesota arose from failures to nominate progressive Republican or Democratic candidates to oppose the conservative governor Joseph A.A. Burnquist. The State Labor Convention was held on August 25, 1918, by a coalition of Labor Unions, Socialists, Independents, members of the Nonpartisan League, and some Democrats dissatisfied with the conservative wing of the party. The Convention was led by progressive Democrat and former governor John Lind. David Evans was nominated for governor. By October, the Evans campaign had organized into the 'Nonpartisan League and Labor' Ticket. By November, the Evans' campaign had finalized the foundation of the Farmer-Labor Party of Minnesota. Evans would place second. The Duluth Union Labor Party (DULP) of Duluth joined later, after electing William Leighton Carss to the House.

The FLP ran on a platform of farmer and labor union protection, government ownership of certain industries, and social security laws.

The party first found major electoral success in the wake of the Great Depression, with statewide offices, notably the governor's office, being won. Governor Floyd B. Olson was elected. Olson campaigned on a number of progressive reforms. One of these was old-age pension, which would become social security. For this policy, he collaborated with the Women's Welfare League. Olson opposed the creation of new departments of law enforcement, instead arguing for expanded powers and usage of pre-existing organizations. The one exception was a proposal for a Board of Parole, a criminal investigation organization independent from the Police and Prison systems. The plan was wildly supported, and was endorsed by the Minneapolis Police Department, and judges Oscar Hallam, and John Meighen.

In 1936, the FLP was informally allied with the New Deal coalition and supported the reelection of President Franklin Roosevelt. Roosevelt was building a national coalition and wanted a solid base in Minnesota, where the Democrats were a weak third party. Roosevelt had a deal with Governor Olson whereby the FLP would get federal patronage, and in turn the FLP would work to block a third-party ticket against Roosevelt in 1936. Governor Olson died in 1936 of cancer, leaving Hjalmar Petersen as governor until Elmer Benson took office in 1937.

One of the primary obstacles of the party, besides constant vilification on the pages of local and state newspapers, was the difficulty of uniting the party's divergent base and maintaining political union between rural farmers and urban laborers who often had little in common other than the populist perception that they were an oppressed class of hardworking producers exploited by a small elite.

As Olson was the unifying figure in the party, both Benson and Petersen claimed to be his successor. In 1938, Petersen and Benson ran against each other in the primary. Benson led the radical wing, while Petersen led the more moderate leftist wing. Benson would win the primary. Benson's former Wisconsin political allies Governor Philip La Follette and Senator Robert M. La Follette Jr. broke with him. La Follette sought to unite the Farmer–Labor party with the Wisconsin Progressive Party into the National Progressives of America, with candidates already slated in Iowa. Benson rejected the union, resulting in the collapse of relations between the two and causing internal conflict within the regional political parties. Following Benson's defeat in the general election, Petersen's faction dominated the FLP. The party suffered further setbacks in 1940 and 1942, losing congressional seats. Petersen failed twice to recapture the Governor's office.

According to political scientist George Mayer:

The farmer approached problems as a proprietor or petty capitalist. Relief to him meant a mitigation of conditions that interfered with successful farming. It involved such things as tax reduction, easier access to credit, and a floor under farm prices. His individualist psychology did not create scruples against government aid, but he welcomed it only as long as it improved agricultural conditions. When official paternalism took the form of public works or the dole, he openly opposed it because assistance on such terms forced him to abandon his chosen profession, to submerge his individuality in the labor crew, and to suffer the humiliation of the bread line. Besides, a public works program required increased revenue, and since the state relied heavily on the property tax, the cost of the program seemed likely to fall primarily on him.

At the opposite end of the seesaw sat the city worker, who sought relief from the hunger, exposure, and disease that followed the wake of unemployment. Dependent on an impersonal industrial machine, he had sloughed off the frontier tradition of individualism for the more serviceable doctrine of cooperation through trade unionism. Unlike the depressed farmer, the unemployed worker often had no property or economic stake to protect. He was largely immune to taxation and had nothing to lose by backing proposals to dilute property rights or redistribute the wealth. Driven by the primitive instinct to survive, the worker demanded financial relief measures from the state.

The New Deal farm programs made the American Farm Bureau Federation the main organization for farmers. It was hostile to the FLP, leaving the FLP without power regarding farm economics.

The Minnesota Democratic Party, in a campaign led by Hubert Humphrey and Elmer Benson, was able to unite with the Farmer–Labor Party on April 15, 1944, creating the Minnesota Democratic–Farmer–Labor Party.

== Notable members ==
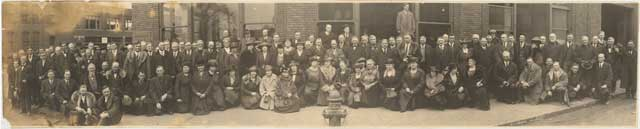
The 1922 Farmer–Labor Convention, held in Minneapolis

=== Governors of Minnesota ===
- Floyd B. Olson (1931–1936)
- Hjalmar Petersen (1936–1937)
- Elmer Austin Benson (1937–1939)

=== Lieutenant governors of Minnesota ===
- Henry M. Arens (1931–1933)
- Konrad K. Solberg (1933–1935)
- Hjalmar Petersen (1935–1936)
- Gottfrid Lindsten (1937–1939)

=== Attorneys general of Minnesota ===
- Harry H. Peterson (1933–1936)
- William S. Ervin (1936–1939)

=== Minnesota state treasurers ===
- C. A. Halverson (1937–1939)

=== United States senators ===
- Henrik Shipstead (1923–1941); later became a Republican
- Magnus Johnson (1923–1925)
- Elmer Austin Benson (1935–1937)
- Ernest Lundeen (1937–1940)

=== United States representatives ===
- Charles August Lindbergh (1907–1917) (elected as a Republican)
- William Leighton Carss (1919–1921, 1925–1929)
- Ole J. Kvale (1923–1929)
- Knud Wefald (1923–1927)
- Paul John Kvale (1929–1939)
- Henry M. Arens (1933–1935)
- Magnus Johnson (1933–1935)
- Ernest Lundeen (1933–1937); had previously served as a Republican Representative (1915–1917), also served in the Senate
- Francis Shoemaker (1933–1935)
- Rich T. Buckler (1935–1943)
- John T. Bernard (1937–1939)
- Dewey Johnson (1937–1939)
- Henry Teigan (1937–1939)
- Harold Hagen (1943–1955); served as a Republican after 1945

=== Speakers of the Minnesota House of Representatives ===
- Charles Munn (1933–1935)
- Harold H. Barker (1937–1939)

=== Minnesota state legislators ===
- Samuel H. Bellman (1935–1938)
- Willard F. Bennett (1933–1943)
- Myrtle Cain (1923–1924)
- John W. Cox (1935–1938)
- Andrew Olaf Devold (1915–1918, 1919–1926, 1931–1939)
- Sylvanus Stockwell (1923-1926, 1929-1940)

=== Local politicians ===
- William A. Anderson, Mayor of Minneapolis (1931–1933)
- Thomas E. Latimer, Mayor of Minneapolis (1935–1937)
- William Mahoney, Mayor of St. Paul (1932–1934)

=== Other members ===
- Nellie Stone Johnson, civil rights activist
- Thomas Van Lear, former mayor of Minneapolis
- Walter Liggett, journalist
- Willard Munger, future state legislator
- Susie Williamson Stageberg, called the "Mother of Farmer-Labor"

== Electoral history ==
=== Federal offices ===
| U.S. Senate | | | | | U.S. House of Representatives | | | | | | |
| Year | Nominee | # votes | % votes | Place | Election | Leader | Votes | | Seats | Position | Control |
|---|---|---|---|---|---|---|---|---|---|---|---|
| 1918 | Did Not Contest | | | | 1918 | Did Not Contest | | | 0 / 10 | Steady | Republican |
| 1920 | No Seat Up | | | | 1920 | N/A | 62,332 | 8.34% | 0 / 10 | Steady | Republican |
| 1922 | Henrik Shipstead | 325,372 | 47.10 / 100 | Elected | 1922 | N/A | 35,551 | 5.58% | 1 / 10 | ▲1 | Republican |
| 1923 (S) | Magnus Johnson | 290,165 | 57.48 / 100 | Elected | 1924 | N/A | 337,035 | 41.48% | 3 / 10 | ▲2 | Republican |
| 1924 | Magnus Johnson | 380,646 | 45.50 / 100 | 2nd of 5 | 1924 | N/A | 337,035 | 41.48% | 3 / 10 | ▲2 | Republican |
| 1926 | No Seat Up | | | | 1926 | N/A | 230,758 | 35.03% | 2 / 10 | ▼1 | Republican |
| 1928 | Henrik Shipstead | 665,169 | 65.38 / 100 | Re-elected | 1928 | N/A | 251,126 | 25.84% | 1 / 10 | ▼1 | Republican |
| 1930 | Ernest Lundeen | 178,671 | 22.89 / 100 | 3rd of 5 | 1930 | N/A | 271,599 | 35.75% | 1 / 10 | Steady | Republican |
| 1932 | No Seat Up | | | | 1932 | N/A | 388,616 | 38.75% | 5 / 9 | ▲4 | Farmer-Labor |
| 1934 | Henrik Shipstead | 503,379 | 49.87 / 100 | Re-elected | 1934 | N/A | 376,927 | 37.86% | 3 / 9 | ▼2 | Republican |
| 1936 (S) | Did Not Contest | | | | 1936 | N/A | 462,714 | 42.40% | 5 / 9 | ▲2 | Farmer-Labor |
| 1936 | Ernest Lundeen | 663,363 | 62.24 / 100 | Elected | 1936 | N/A | 462,714 | 42.40% | 5 / 9 | ▲2 | Farmer-Labor |
| 1938 | No Seat Up | | | | 1938 | N/A | 338,684 | 31.63% | 1 / 9 | ▼4 | Republican |
| 1940 | Elmer Austin Benson | 310,875 | 25.70 / 100 | 2nd of 5 | 1940 | N/A | 298,250 | 24.74% | 1 / 9 | Steady | Republican |
| 1942 | Elmer Austin Benson | 213,965 | 28.21 / 100 | 2nd of 4 | 1942 | N/A | 151,684 | 19.92% | 1 / 9 | Steady | Republican |

=== Minnesota state offices ===
| Governor | | | | | Lieutenant Governor | | | | | Attorney General | | | | |
| Year | Nominee | # votes | % votes | Place | Year | Nominee | # votes | % votes | Place | Year | Nominee | # votes | % votes | Place |
|---|---|---|---|---|---|---|---|---|---|---|---|---|---|---|
| 1918 | David H. Evans | 111,948 | 30.28 / 100 | 2nd of 5 | 1918 | Did Not Contest | | | | 1918 | Did Not Contest | | | |
| 1920 | Did Not Contest | | | | 1920 | Did Not Contest | | | | 1920 | Did Not Contest | | | |
| 1922 | Magnus Johnson | 295,479 | 43.13 / 100 | 2nd of 3 | 1922 | Arthur A. Siegler | 267,417 | 39.59 / 100 | 2nd of 3 | 1922 | Roy C. Smelker | 254,715 | 39.41 / 100 | 2nd of 3 |
| 1924 | Floyd B. Olson | 366,029 | 43.84 / 100 | 2nd of 5 | 1924 | Emil E. Holmes | 345,633 | 42.86 / 100 | 2nd of 3 | 1924 | Thomas V. Sullivan | 342,236 | 42.59 / 100 | 2nd of 3 |
| 1926 | Magnus Johnson | 266,845 | 38.09 / 100 | 2nd of 3 | 1926 | Emil E. Holmes | 236,307 | 35.62 / 100 | 2nd of 3 | 1926 | Frank McAllister | 214,781 | 33.32 / 100 | 2nd of 3 |
| 1928 | Ernest Lundeen | 227,193 | 22.72 / 100 | 2nd of 5 | 1928 | Thomas J. Meighen | 235,133 | 24.96 / 100 | 2nd of 3 | 1928 | C. F. Gaarenstroom | 192,472 | 20.87 / 100 | 2nd of 3 |
| 1930 | Floyd B. Olson | 473,154 | 59.34 / 100 | Elected | 1930 | Henry M. Arens | 345,225 | 50.32 / 100 | Elected | 1930 | Joseph B. Himsl | 256,581 | 36.57 / 100 | 2nd of 3 |
| 1932 | Floyd B. Olson | 522,438 | 50.57 / 100 | Re-elected | 1932 | Konrad K. Solberg | 429,759 | 45.34 / 100 | Elected | 1932 | Harry H. Peterson | 379,418 | 39.87 / 100 | Elected |
| 1934 | Floyd B. Olson | 468,812 | 44.61 / 100 | Re-elected | 1934 | Hjalmar Petersen | 428,897 | 43.64 / 100 | Elected | 1934 | Harry H. Peterson | 436,140 | 44.89 / 100 | Re-elected |
| 1936 | Elmer Austin Benson | 680,342 | 60.74 / 100 | Elected | 1936 | Gottfrid Lindsten | 502,856 | 47.46 / 100 | Elected | 1936 | Harry H. Peterson | 530,815 | 49.62 / 100 | Re-elected |
| 1938 | Elmer Austin Benson | 387,263 | 34.18 / 100 | 2nd of 4 | 1938 | John J. Kinzer | 374,577 | 34.73 / 100 | 2nd of 3 | 1938 | William S. Ervin | 378,385 | 35.56 / 100 | 2nd of 3 |
| 1940 | Hjalmar Petersen | 459,609 | 36.55 / 100 | 2nd of 4 | 1940 | Howard Y. Williams | 305,418 | 26.11 / 100 | 2nd of 3 | 1940 | David J. Erickson | 284,337 | 24.35 / 100 | 2nd of 3 |
| 1942 | Hjalmar Petersen | 299,917 | 37.76 / 100 | 2nd of 5 | 1942 | Juls J. Anderson | 250,410 | 33.42 / 100 | 2nd of 3 | 1942 | David J. Erickson | 187,074 | 25.48 / 100 | 2nd of 3 |
| Secretary of State | | | | | Treasurer | | | | | Auditor | | | | |
| Year | Nominee | # votes | % votes | Place | Year | Nominee | # votes | % votes | Place | Year | Nominee | # votes | % votes | Place |
| 1918 | Did Not Contest | | | | 1918 | Did Not Contest | | | | 1918 | Did Not Contest | | | |
| 1920 | Lily J. Anderson | 193,658 | 26.37 / 100 | 2nd of 5 | 1920 | John P. Wagner | 191,429 | 26.19 / 100 | 2nd of 4 | 1920 | Seat Not Up | | | |
| 1922 | Susie Williamson Stageberg | 247,757 | 37.37 / 100 | 2nd of 3 | 1922 | Frank H. Keyes | 294,102 | 46.39 / 100 | 2nd of 2 | 1922 | Eliza Evans Deming | 253,913 | 39.60 / 100 | 2nd of 3 |
| 1924 | Susie Williamson Stageberg | 288,946 | 35.75 / 100 | 2nd of 3 | 1924 | Carl M. "C. M." Berg | 322,585 | 40.67 / 100 | 2nd of 3 | 1924 | Seat Not Up | | | |
| 1926 | Charles Olson | 217,424 | 32.60 / 100 | 2nd of 2 | 1926 | Thomas J. Meighen | 244,861 | 38.89 / 100 | 2nd of 2 | 1926 | S. O. Tjosvold | 218,074 | 34.52 / 100 | 2nd of 2 |
| 1928 | Susie Williamson Stageberg | 178,096 | 18.41 / 100 | 2nd of 3 | 1928 | Peter J. Seberger | 205,228 | 21.95 / 100 | 2nd of 3 | 1928 | Seat Not Up | | | |
| 1930 | Anna Olson Determan | 209,596 | 27.36 / 100 | 2nd of 4 | 1930 | Frederick B. Miller | 271,286 | 37.41 / 100 | 2nd of 3 | 1930 | Henry Teigan | 260,272 | 35.96 / 100 | 2nd of 3 |
| 1932 | John T. Lyons | 342,496 | 34.79 / 100 | 2nd of 4 | 1932 | Albert H. Kleffman | 360,498 | 37.72 / 100 | 2nd of 3 | 1932 | Seat Not Up | | | |
| 1934 | Konrad K. Solberg | 359,322 | 35.46 / 100 | 2nd of 4 | 1934 | Albert H. Kleffman | 377,472 | 38.78 / 100 | 2nd of 3 | 1934 | John T. Lyons | 379,654 | 38.69 / 100 | 2nd of 3 |
| 1936 | Paul C. Hartig | 426,668 | 39.16 / 100 | 2nd of 4 | 1936 | C. A. Halverson | 468,713 | 43.79 / 100 | Elected | 1936 | Seat Not Up | | | |
| 1938 | Paul A. Rasmussen | 328,474 | 29.81 / 100 | 2nd of 3 | 1938 | C. A. Halverson | 378,160 | 35.27 / 100 | 2nd of 3 | 1938 | John T. Lyons | 364,636 | 33.98 / 100 | 2nd of 3 |
| 1940 | James I. Heller | 230,148 | 19.07 / 100 | 2nd of 3 | 1940 | C. A. Halverson | 296,477 | 25.25 / 100 | 2nd of 3 | 1940 | Seat Not Up | | | |
| 1942 | Daniel D. Collins | 146,825 | 19.07 / 100 | 2nd of 3 | 1942 | Charles J. Johnson | 183,458 | 24.78 / 100 | 2nd of 3 | 1942 | Did Not Contest | | | |

== See also ==
- History of the Minnesota Democratic–Farmer–Labor Party
- Iowa Farmer–Labor Party
- Non-Partisan League
- New Deal coalition
- National Progressives of America
- Wisconsin Progressive Party
