= Attorney General Ervin =

Attorney General Ervin may refer to:

- Richard Ervin (1905–2004), Attorney General of Florida
- William S. Ervin (1886–1951), Attorney General of Minnesota
