= Streissguth =

Streissguth is a surname. Notable people with the surname include:

- Ann Streissguth (1932–2023), American psychologist
- Theodore G. Streissguth (1855–1915), American businessman and politician
