= 1924 Minnesota Attorney General election =

- November 4, 1924
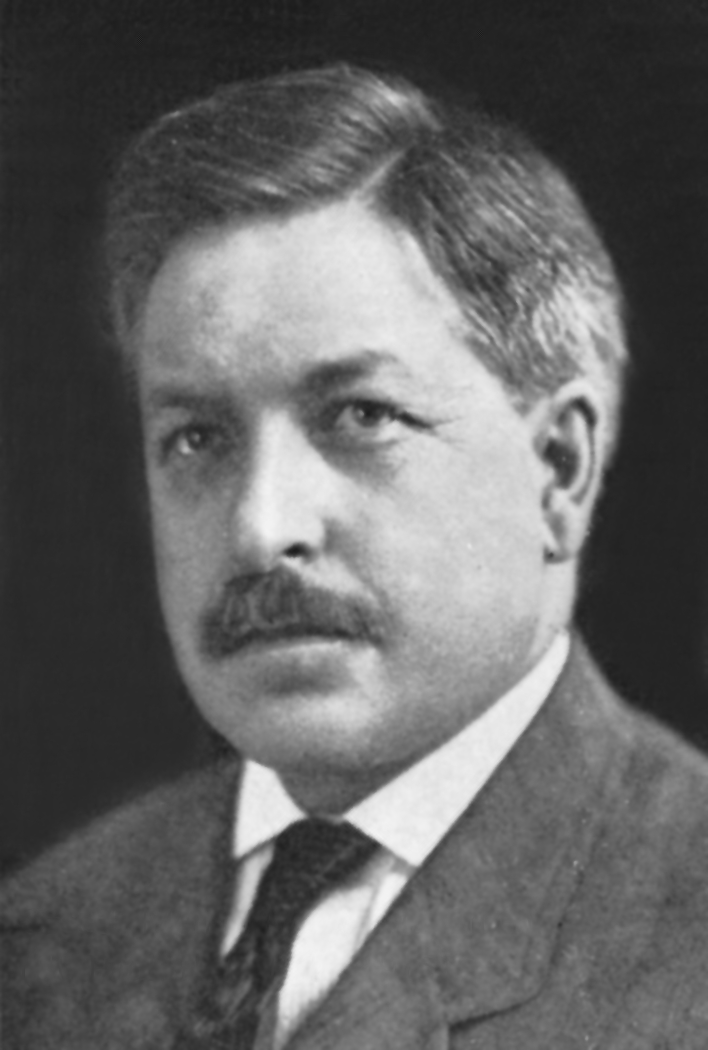

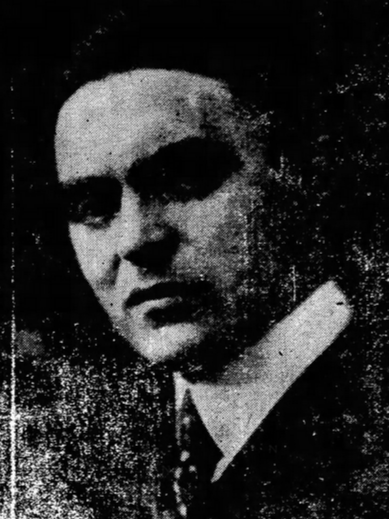

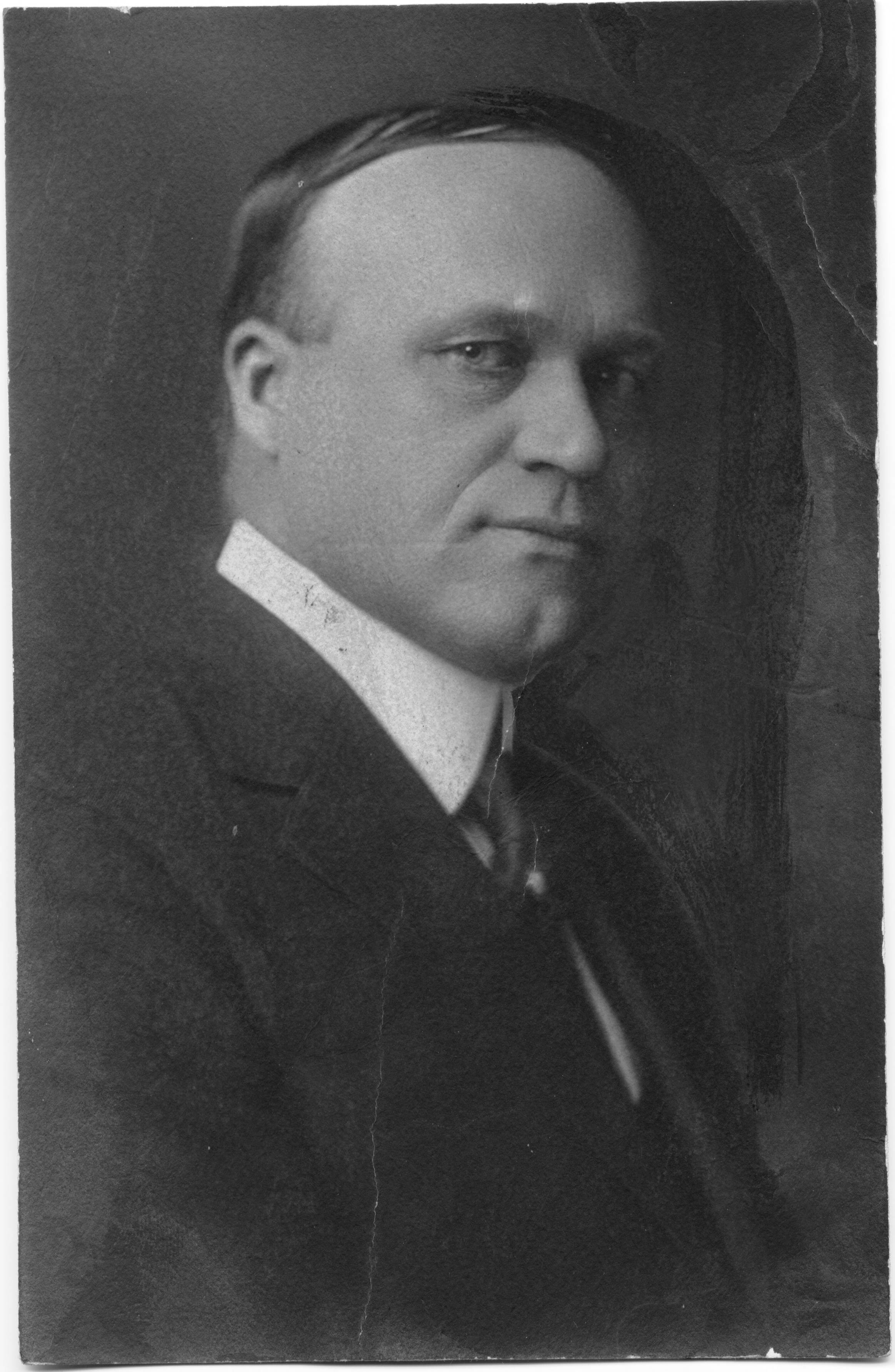
Nominee	Clifford L. Hilton	Thomas V. Sullivan	Robert C. Bell
Party	Republican	Farmer–Labor	Democratic
Popular vote	417,376	342,236	43,913
Percentage	51.94%	42.59%	5.47%
Attorney General before election
Clifford L. Hilton
Republican
Elected Attorney General
Clifford L. Hilton
Republican

The 1924 Minnesota Attorney General election was held on November 4, 1924, in order to elect the attorney general of Minnesota. Republican nominee and incumbent attorney general Clifford L. Hilton defeated Farmer–Labor nominee Thomas V. Sullivan and Democratic nominee Robert C. Bell.

== General election ==
On election day, November 4, 1924, Republican nominee Clifford L. Hilton won re-election by a margin of 75,140 votes against his foremost opponent Farmer–Labor nominee Thomas V. Sullivan, thereby retaining Republican control over the office of attorney general. Hilton was sworn in for his fourth full term on January 3, 1925.

=== Results ===
Minnesota Attorney General election, 1924
Party	Candidate	Votes	%
Republican	Clifford L. Hilton (incumbent)	417,376	51.94
Farmer–Labor	Thomas V. Sullivan	342,236	42.59
Democratic	Robert C. Bell	43,913	5.47
Total votes		803,525	100.00
Republican hold			
