= 1918 Minnesota Attorney General election =

- November 5, 1918
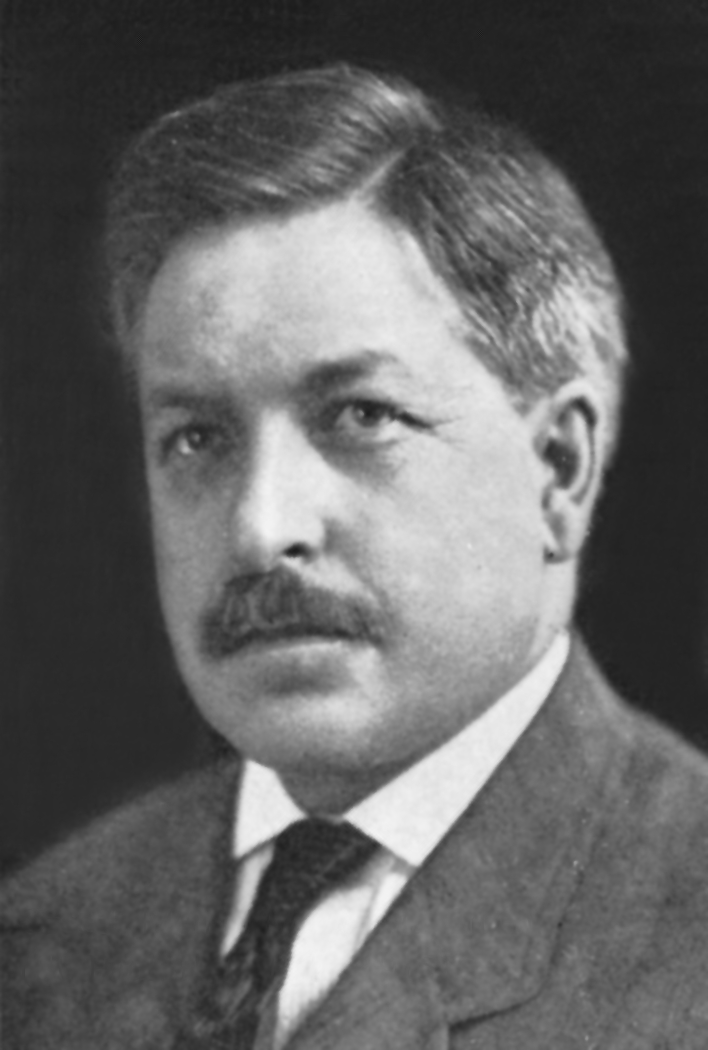

Nominee	Clifford L. Hilton	Tom E. Davis	Bjorn B. Gislason
Party	Republican	Farmer–Labor	Democratic
Popular vote	180,768	99,920	56,001
Percentage	51.39%	28.41%	15.92%
Attorney General before election
Clifford L. Hilton (Acting)
Republican
Elected Attorney General
Clifford L. Hilton
Republican

The 1918 Minnesota Attorney General election was held on November 5, 1918, in order to elect the attorney general of Minnesota. Republican nominee and incumbent acting attorney general Clifford L. Hilton defeated Farmer–Labor nominee Tom E. Davis, Democratic nominee Bjorn B. Gislason and National nominee Lars Haug.

== General election ==
On election day, November 5, 1918, Republican nominee Clifford L. Hilton won the election by a margin of 80,848 votes against his foremost opponent Farmer–Labor nominee Tom E. Davis, thereby retaining Republican control over the office of attorney general. Hilton was sworn in for his first full term on January 3, 1919.

=== Results ===
Minnesota Attorney General election, 1918
Party	Candidate	Votes	%
Republican	Clifford L. Hilton (incumbent)	180,768	51.39
Farmer–Labor	Tom E. Davis	99,920	28.41
Democratic	Bjorn B. Gislason	56,001	15.92
National	Lars Haug	15,047	4.28
Total votes		351,736	100.00
Republican hold			
