= 1926 Minnesota Attorney General election =

- November 2, 1926
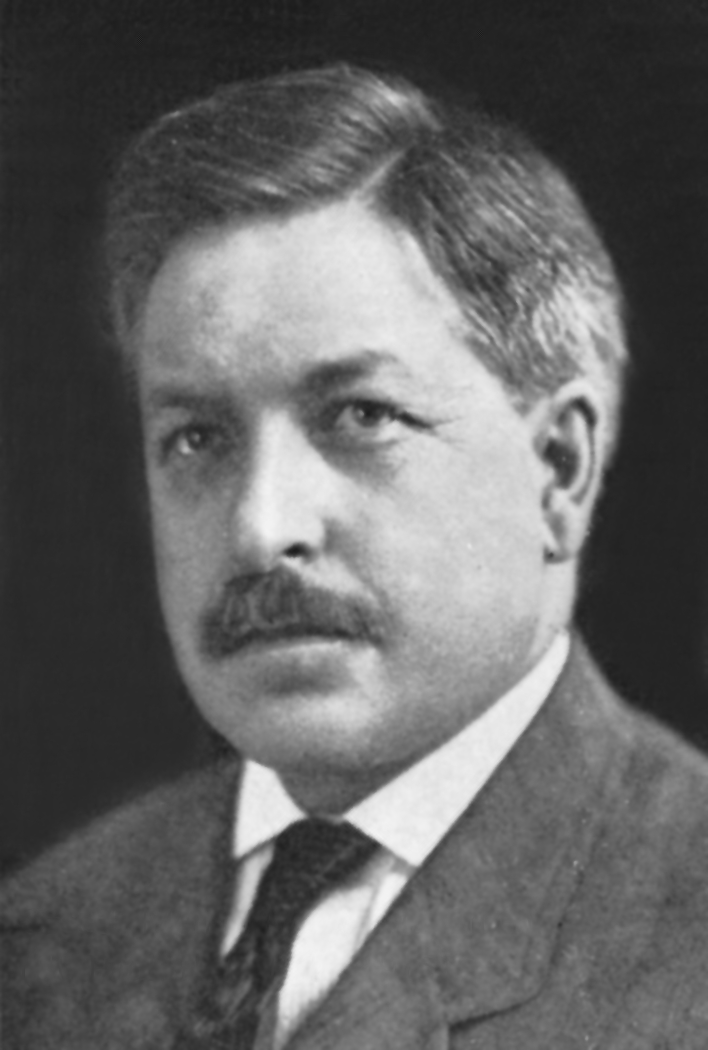

Nominee	Clifford L. Hilton	Frank McAllister	George Cahill
Party	Republican	Farmer–Labor	Democratic
Popular vote	384,724	214,781	45,049
Percentage	59.69%	33.32%	6.99%
Attorney General before election
Clifford L. Hilton
Republican
Elected Attorney General
Clifford L. Hilton
Republican

The 1926 Minnesota Attorney General election was held on November 2, 1926, in order to elect the attorney general of Minnesota. Republican nominee and incumbent attorney general Clifford L. Hilton defeated Farmer–Labor nominee Frank McAllister and Democratic nominee George Cahill.

== General election ==
On election day, November 2, 1926, Republican nominee Clifford L. Hilton won re-election by a margin of 169,943 votes against his foremost opponent Farmer–Labor nominee Frank McAllister, thereby retaining Republican control over the office of attorney general. Hilton was sworn in for his fifth full term on January 3, 1927.

=== Results ===
Minnesota Attorney General election, 1926
Party	Candidate	Votes	%
Republican	Clifford L. Hilton (incumbent)	384,724	59.69
Farmer–Labor	Frank McAllister	214,781	33.32
Democratic	George Cahill	45,049	6.99
Total votes		644,554	100.00
Republican hold			
