= 1928 Minnesota Attorney General election =

- November 6, 1928
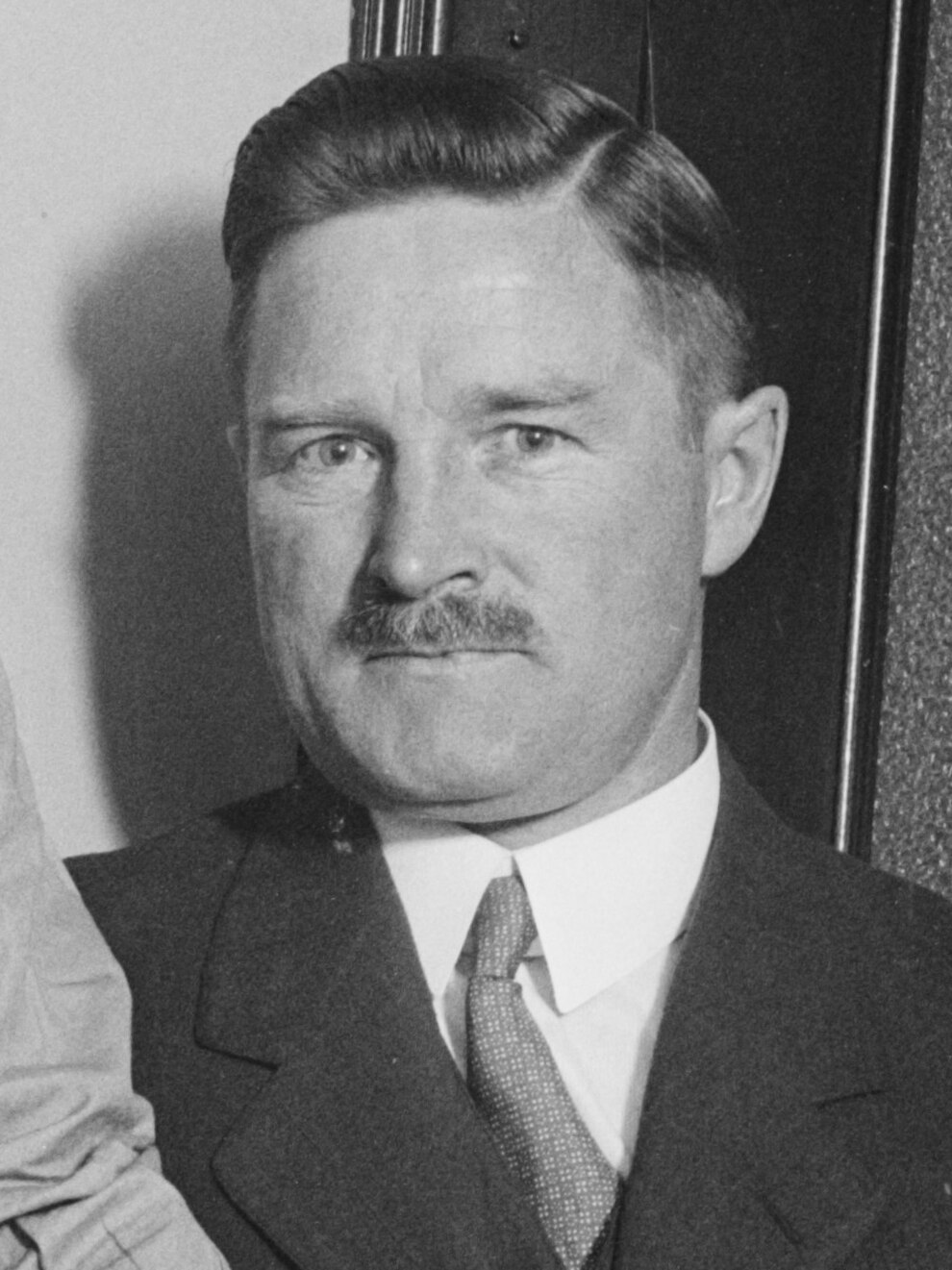

Nominee	G. Aaron Youngquist	George Cahill	Christian F. Gaarenstroom
Party	Republican	Democratic	Farmer–Labor
Popular vote	524,151	205,681	192,472
Percentage	56.83%	22.30%	20.87%
Attorney General before election
G. Aaron Youngquist (Acting)
Republican
Elected Attorney General
G. Aaron Youngquist
Republican

The 1928 Minnesota Attorney General election was held on November 6, 1928, in order to elect the attorney general of Minnesota. Republican nominee and incumbent acting attorney general G. Aaron Youngquist defeated Democratic nominee George Cahill and Farmer–Labor nominee Christian F. Gaarenstroom.

== General election ==
On election day, November 6, 1928, Republican nominee G. Aaron Youngquist won the election by a margin of 318,470 votes against his foremost opponent Democratic nominee George Cahill, thereby retaining Republican control over the office of attorney general. Youngquist was sworn in for his first full term on January 3, 1929.

=== Results ===
Minnesota Attorney General election, 1928
Party	Candidate	Votes	%
Republican	G. Aaron Youngquist (incumbent)	524,151	56.83
Democratic	George Cahill	205,681	22.30
Farmer–Labor	Christian F. Gaarenstroom	192,472	20.87
Total votes		922,304	100.00
Republican hold			
