= 1932 Minnesota Attorney General election =

- November 8, 1932
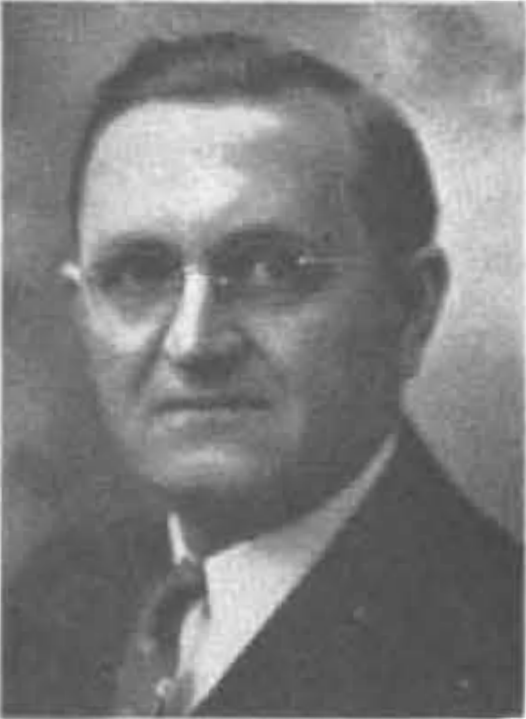

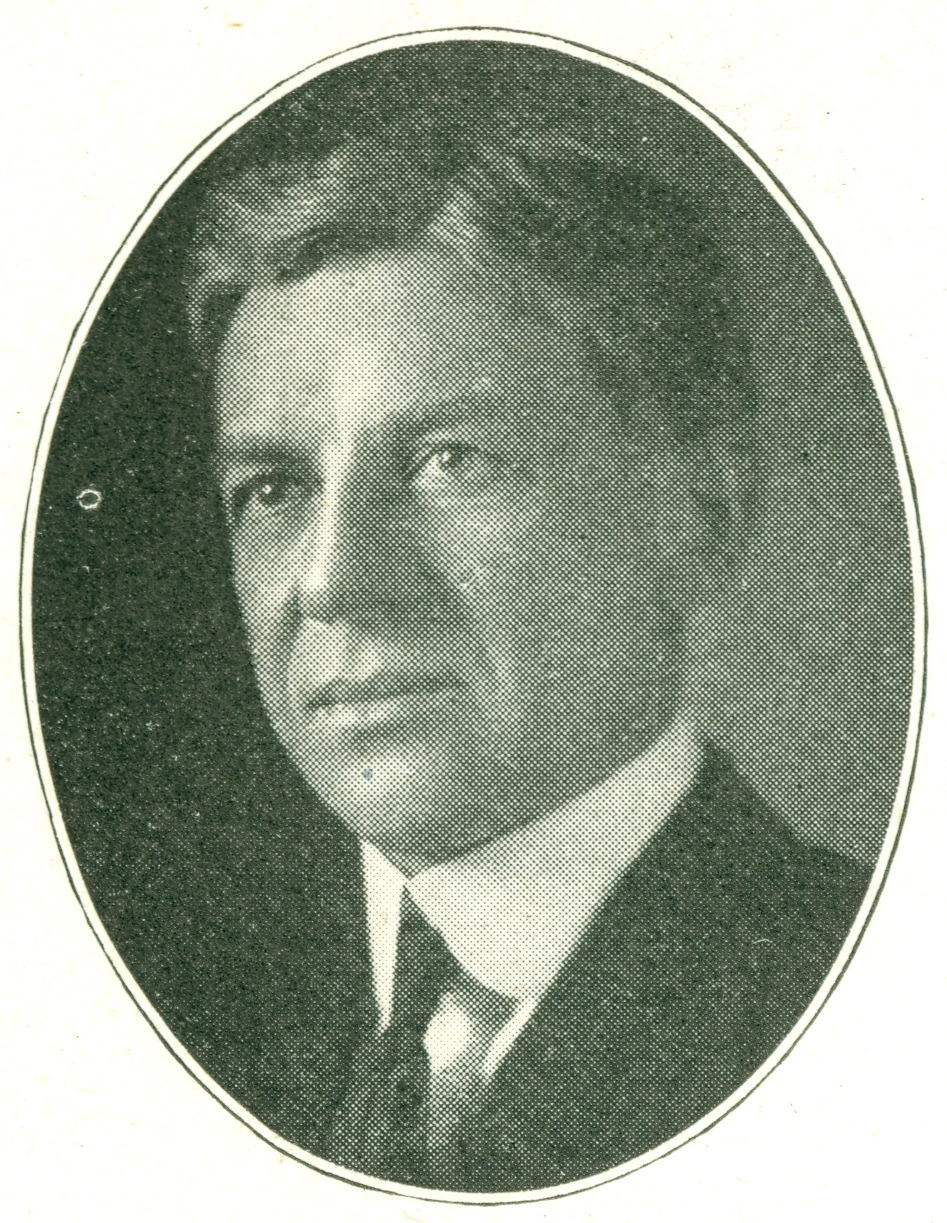

Nominee	Harry H. Peterson	Henry N. Benson	Ray G. Moonan
Party	Farmer–Labor	Republican	Democratic
Popular vote	379,418	345,486	218,076
Percentage	39.87%	36.31%	22.92%
Attorney General before election
Henry N. Benson
Republican
Elected Attorney General
Harry H. Peterson
Farmer–Labor

The 1932 Minnesota Attorney General election was held on November 8, 1932, in order to elect the attorney general of Minnesota. Farmer–Labor nominee Harry H. Peterson defeated Republican nominee and incumbent attorney general Henry N. Benson, Democratic nominee Ray G. Moonan and Communist nominee Thomas Foley.

== General election ==
On election day, November 8, 1932, Farmer–Labor nominee Harry H. Peterson won the election by a margin of 33,932 votes against his foremost opponent Republican nominee Henry N. Benson, thereby gaining Farmer–Labor control over the office of attorney general. Peterson was sworn in as the 19th attorney general of Minnesota on January 2, 1933.

=== Results ===
Minnesota Attorney General election, 1932
Party	Candidate	Votes	%
Farmer–Labor	Harry H. Peterson	379,418	39.87
Republican	Henry N. Benson (incumbent)	345,486	36.31
Democratic	Ray G. Moonan	218,076	22.92
Communist	Thomas Foley	8,585	0.90
Total votes		951,565	100.00
Farmer–Labor gain from Republican			
