= Zack Annexstad =

American football player (born 2000)

No. 5
- Position: Quarterback

Personal information
- Born: April 16, 2000 (age 26); Norseland, Minnesota, U.S.
- Listed height: 6 ft 3 in (1.91 m)
- Listed weight: 220 lb (100 kg)

Career information
- High school: IMG (Bradenton, Florida)
- College: Minnesota (2018–2021); Illinois State (2022–2023)
- NFL draft: 2024: undrafted

Career history
- Tampa Bay Buccaneers (2024)*
- * Offseason or practice squad member only

Zack Annexstad (born April 16, 2000) is an American former professional football quarterback. He played college football for the Minnesota Golden Gophers and Illinois State Redbirds.

== Early life ==
Annexstad grew up in Norseland, Minnesota, and attended Mankato West High School. In his sophomore year at Mankato West, Annexstad was named the football team's starting quarterback but then missed time due to injury. He transferred to IMG Academy in Florida for his final two seasons of high school, taking over the starting job as a senior from Artur Sitkowski. He threw for 940 yards and 10 touchdowns while completing 63-of-112 passes, helping the school go undefeated. He opted to play college football for the Minnesota Golden Gophers as a walk-on despite having received offers from other Division I schools.

== College career ==
Annexstad won Minnesota's starting role as a true freshman in 2018, becoming the first to do so at the Power Five level since Baker Mayfield. In his debut, he threw for 220 yards and two touchdowns in a 48–10 win over New Mexico State. He ultimately started seven games, being limited due to injury near the end of the season, and totaled 1,277 passing yards with nine touchdowns to seven interceptions while completing 51.9 percent of his passes. Annexstad injured his foot during a practice prior to the 2019 season and missed the entire year. He saw no action in 2020, then appeared in two games in the 2021 season, attempting no passes.

Annexstad entered the NCAA transfer portal after the 2021 season. He ultimately transferred to the Illinois State Redbirds and became the starter. In his first year with the team, he became captain and was named Missouri Valley Football Conference (MVFC) All-Newcomer as well as MVFC first-team All-Academic. He started eight games before getting injured, ending his year having thrown for 1,691 yards and 11 touchdowns while completing 62.8 percent of his pass attempts; he also had a team-leading four rushing touchdowns. He returned for a final season in 2023 and was chosen honorable mention all-conference, first-team All-MVFC Academic as well as an FCS Academic All-Star. The team captain, he started nine games before missing the rest of the year from injury, ending with a 69.7 completion percentage, 2,114 passing yards and 17 touchdowns along with five interceptions; he placed sixth in the FCS for completions per game and seventh in completion percentage.

== Professional career ==
Pre-draft measurables
Height	Weight	Arm length	Hand span
6 ft 3 in (1.91 m)	220 lb (100 kg)	30 5/8 in (0.78 m)	9 7/8 in (0.25 m)
All values from Pro Day

After going unselected in the 2024 NFL draft, Annexstad was signed by the Tampa Bay Buccaneers as an undrafted free agent. He was waived by the Buccaneers on August 12, 2024.

== Personal life ==
Annexstad's father, Scott, had stints with the Kansas City Chiefs and Washington Redskins. He also has a brother, Brock, who played wide receiver with him at both Minnesota and Illinois State. His cousin, Sam Dekker, played in the National Basketball Association (NBA).
