= 1938 Minnesota Attorney General election =

- November 8, 1938
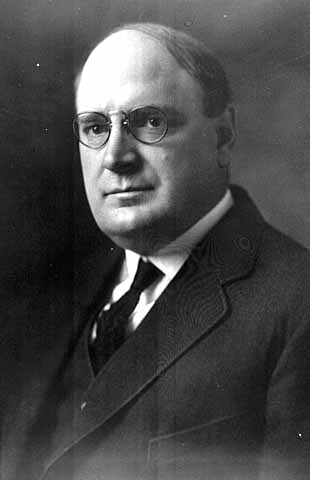

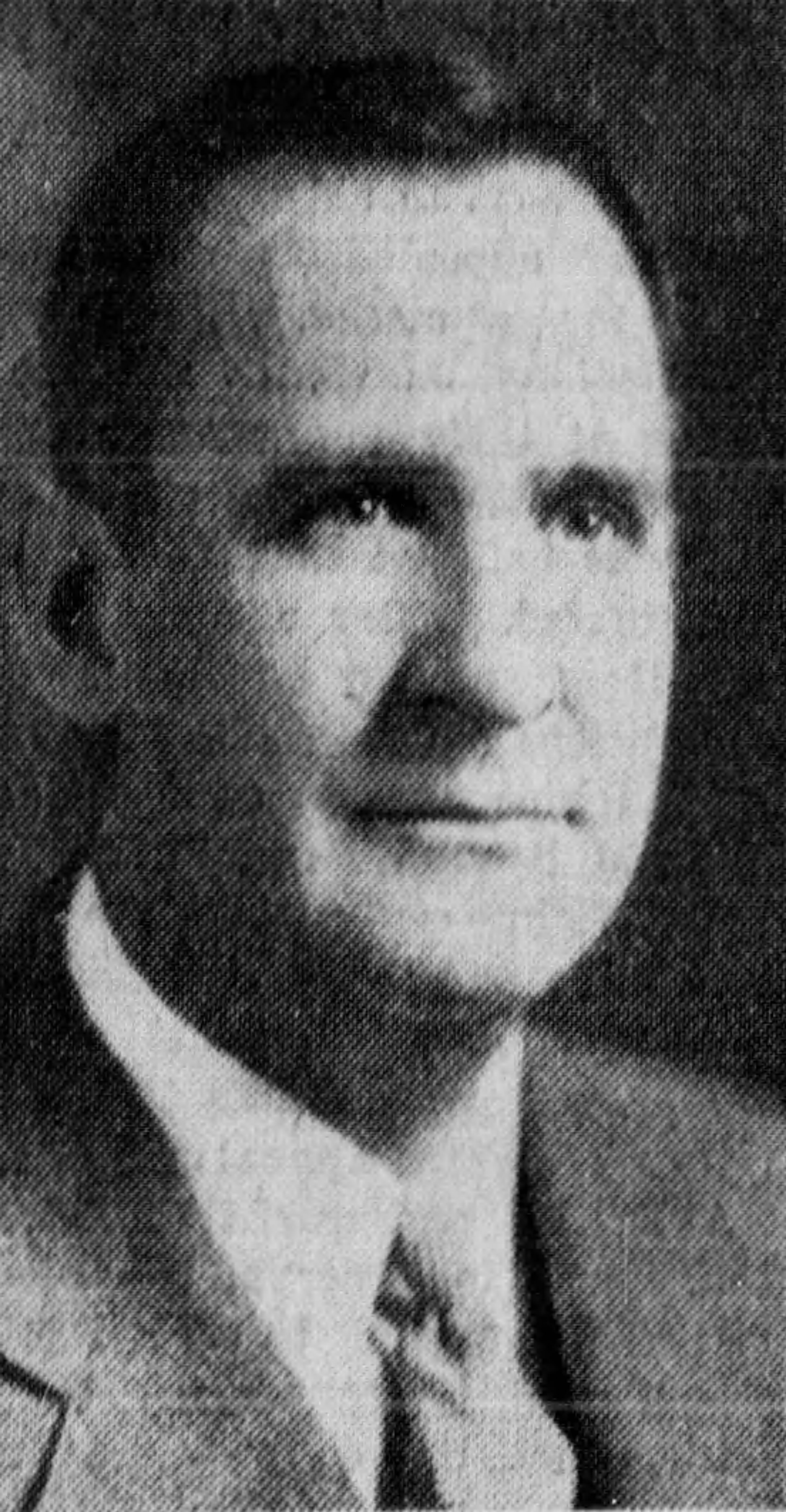

Nominee	Joseph A. A. Burnquist	William S. Ervin	John D. Sullivan
Party	Republican	Farmer–Labor	Democratic
Popular vote	530,971	378,385	154,799
Percentage	49.90%	35.55%	14.55%
Attorney General before election
William S. Ervin (Acting)
Farmer–Labor
Elected Attorney General
Joseph A. A. Burnquist
Republican

The 1938 Minnesota Attorney General election was held on November 8, 1938, in order to elect the attorney general of Minnesota. Republican nominee and former governor of Minnesota Joseph A. A. Burnquist defeated Farmer–Labor nominee and incumbent acting attorney general William S. Ervin and Democratic nominee John D. Sullivan.

== General election ==
On election day, November 8, 1938, Republican nominee Joseph A. A. Burnquist won the election by a margin of 152,586 votes against his foremost opponent Farmer–Labor nominee William S. Ervin, thereby gaining Republican control over the office of attorney general. Burnquist was sworn in as the 21st attorney general of Minnesota on January 2, 1939.

=== Results ===
Minnesota Attorney General election, 1938
Party	Candidate	Votes	%
Republican	Joseph A. A. Burnquist	530,971	49.90
Farmer–Labor	William S. Ervin (incumbent)	378,385	35.55
Democratic	John D. Sullivan	154,799	14.55
Total votes		1,064,155	100.00
Republican gain from Farmer–Labor			
