= 1930 Minnesota Attorney General election =

- November 4, 1930
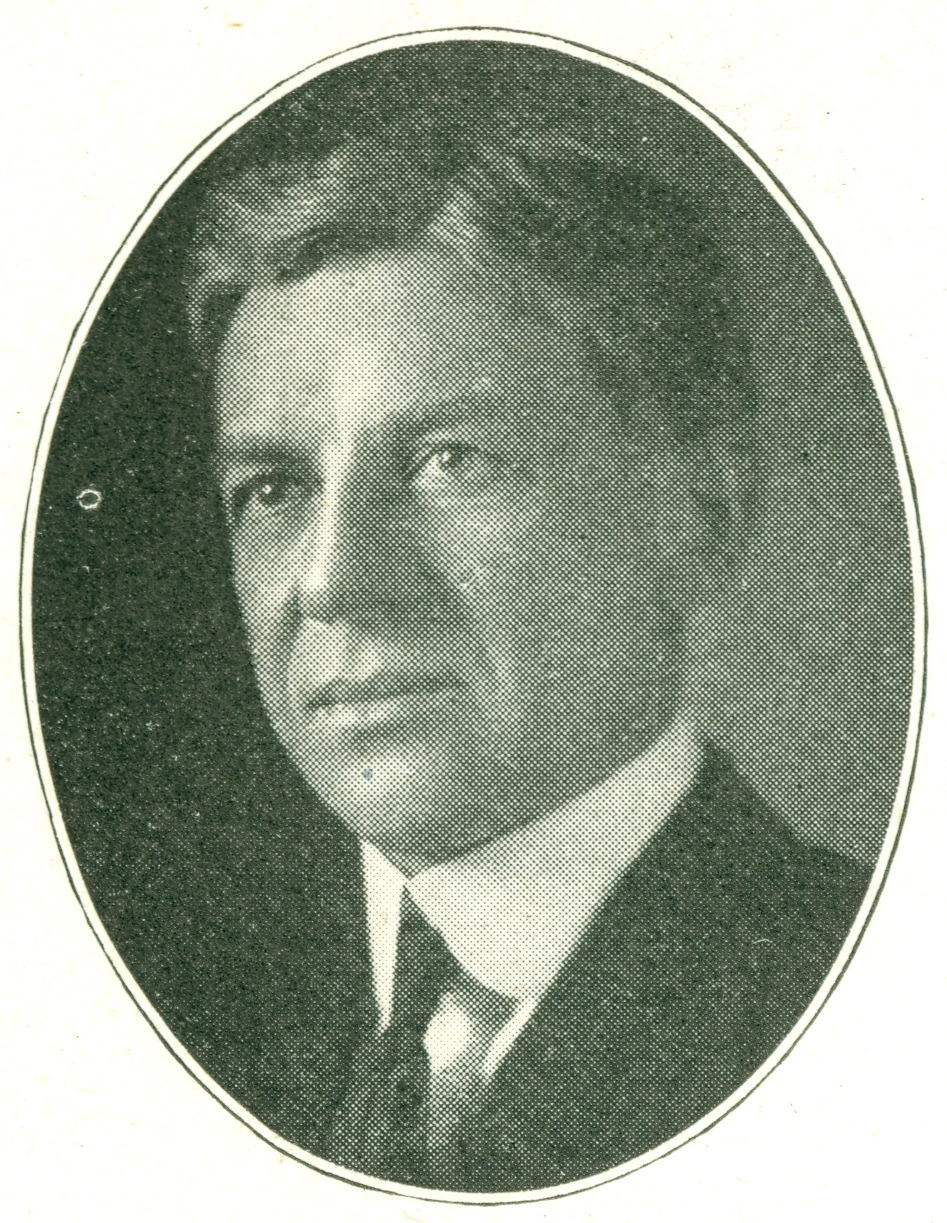

Nominee	Henry N. Benson	Joseph B. Himsl	Walter F. Dacey
Party	Republican	Farmer–Labor	Democratic
Popular vote	358,955	256,581	86,037
Percentage	51.16%	36.57%	12.27%
Attorney General before election
Henry N. Benson (Acting)
Republican
Elected Attorney General
Henry N. Benson
Republican

The 1930 Minnesota Attorney General election was held on November 4, 1930, in order to elect the attorney general of Minnesota. Republican nominee and incumbent acting attorney general Henry N. Benson defeated Farmer–Labor nominee Joseph B. Himsl and Democratic nominee Walter F. Dacey.

== General election ==
On election day, November 4, 1930, Republican nominee Henry N. Benson won the election by a margin of 102,374 votes against his foremost opponent Farmer–Labor nominee Joseph B. Himsl, thereby retaining Republican control over the office of attorney general. Benson was sworn in for his first full term on January 3, 1931.

=== Results ===
Minnesota Attorney General election, 1930
Party	Candidate	Votes	%
Republican	Henry N. Benson (incumbent)	358,955	51.16
Farmer–Labor	Joseph B. Himsl	256,581	36.57
Democratic	Walter F. Dacey	86,037	12.27
Total votes		701,573	100.00
Republican hold			
