= 1918 Minnesota gubernatorial election =

- November 5, 1918
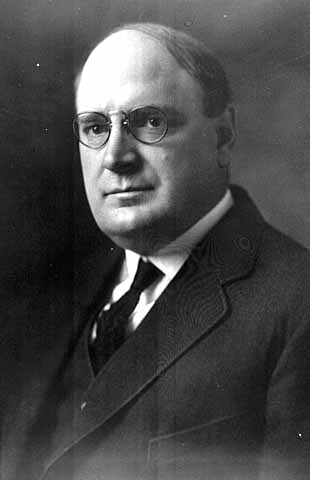

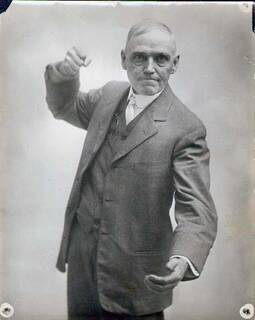

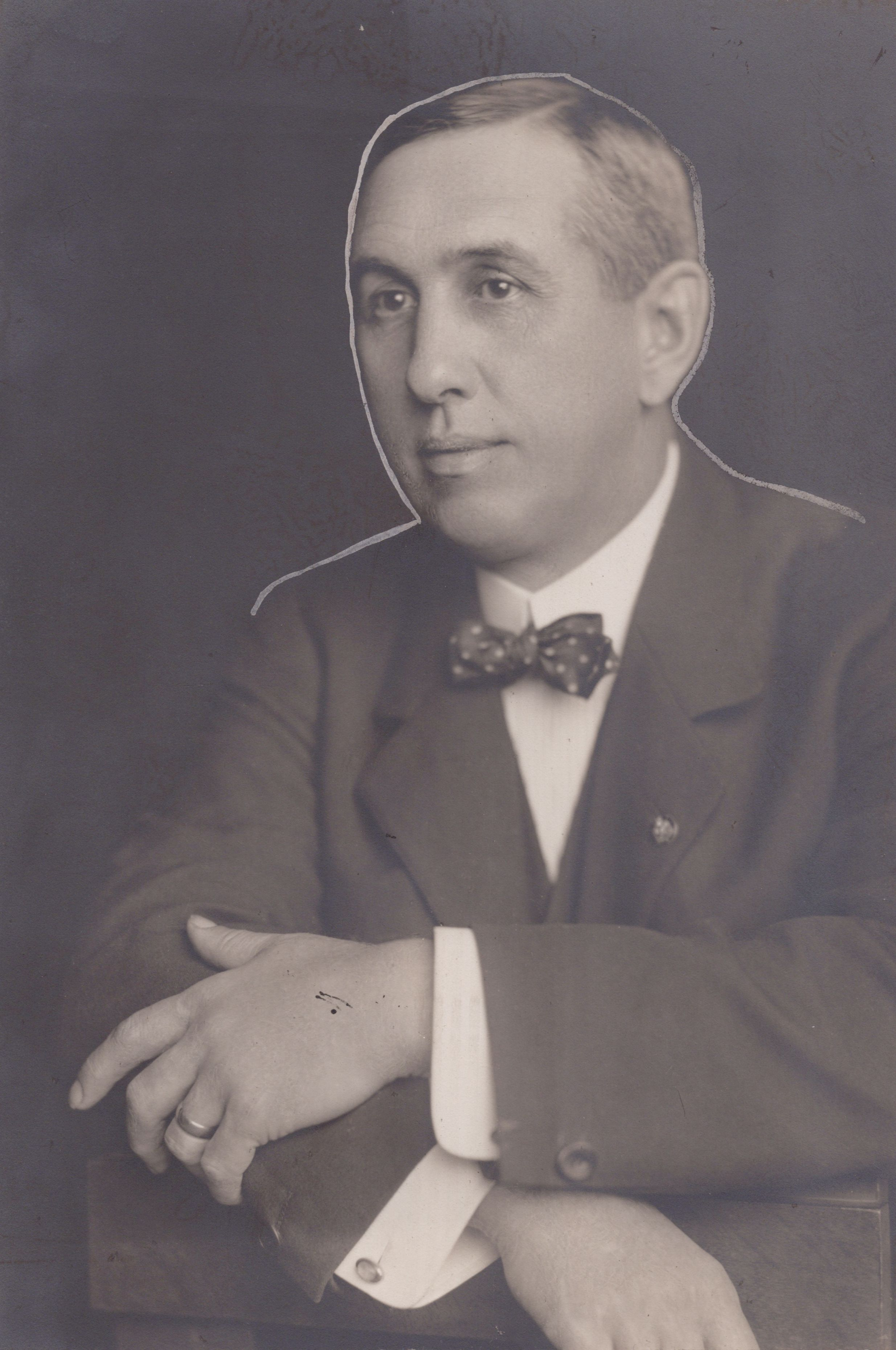
Nominee	J. A. A. Burnquist	David H. Evans	Fred Wheaton
Party	Republican	Farmer–Labor	Democratic
Popular vote	166,515	111,948	76,793
Percentage	42.73%	28.73%	19.71%
- County results Burnquist: 30–40% 40–50% 50–60% 60–70% Evans: 40–50% 50–60% 60–70% Wheaton: 30–40%
Governor before election
J. A. A. Burnquist
Republican
Elected Governor
J. A. A. Burnquist
Republican

The 1918 Minnesota gubernatorial election took place on November 5, 1918. The incumbent Republican Party of Minnesota governor J. A. A. Burnquist defeated Farmer–Labor Party challenger David H. Evans. This was the first gubernatorial election in Minnesota with a Farmer–Labor candidate. The Democratic ticket nominated conservative Fred Wheaton, who ended third. Charles August Lindbergh unsuccessfully ran for the Republican nomination.

== Republican primary ==
Burnquist was challenged by Lindbergh in the primary, which was held on June 16, 1918.

Burnquist's campaign described the primary as "the American Stars and Stripes, or the black banner of sedition and the red rag of socialism?" Burnquist's campaign described Lindbergh as a socialist and an anarchist, and framed Burnquist as a patriotic and loyalist candidate in comparison. Lindbergh was an opponent of the First World War.

Lindbergh was endorsed by the Nonpartisan League.

The primary election was compared to the similarly heated and contested Republican primary of 1904, between Robert C. Dunn and Loren W. Collins.

Burnquist received an endorsement from former governor and then-senator Knute Nelson.

=== Candidates ===
- Joseph A.A. Burnquist, incumbent governor of Minnesota
- Charles August Lindbergh, former U.S. representative from Minnesota's 6th congressional district (1907-1917)

=== Results ===
Minnesota Republican gubernatorial primary results
Party	Candidate	Votes	%
Republican	Joseph A.A. Burnquist	199,325	56.96%
Republican	Charles August Lindbergh	150,626	43.04%

Results of the 1918 Minnesota Republican gubernatorial primary Burnquist: 50–60% 60–70% 70–80% Lindbergh: 50–60% 60–70% 70–80%

== Democratic primary ==
The Democratic Party nominated Fred Wheaton on June 17, 1918, supported by conservative party leader Daniel W. Lawler.

Supported by the Nonpartisan league was candidate Willard L. Comstock, who at first was in the lead but lost the nomination.

=== Candidates ===
- Willard L. Comstock, judge
- Fred Wheaton, owner of the Pythian Advocate

=== Results ===
Minnesota Democratic gubernatorial primary results
Party	Candidate	Votes	%
Democratic	Fred E. Wheaton	16,639	50.96%
Democratic	Willard L. Comstock	16,010	49.04

== State Labor Convention ==
The State Labor Convention was held on August 25, 1918, by a coalition of Labor Unions, Socialists, Independents, members of the Nonpartisan League, and some Democrats dissatisfied with the conservative wing of the party. The convention was led by progressive Democrat and former governor John Lind.

Before the convention began, Howard Everett, Thomas J. Meighen, and George W. Lawson were considered as candidates for governor.

David H. Evans was nominated as an independent candidate for governor. Evans was formerly a Democrat. Initially, Laurence C. Hodgson was suggested, and Evans was not nominated until delegates received word that he would not run for governor. Evans was then nominated under the Nonpartisan League ticket.

== Campaigns ==
Following the nomination of Evans, attempts were made to convince Wheaton to withdraw his candidacy. He refused. He considered withdrawing a "betrayal of his party".

By October, the Evans campaign had organized into the "Nonpartisan League and Labor" ticket. By November, the Evans campaign had finalized the foundation of the Farmer-Labor Party of Minnesota. Evans was expected to finish third.

Before the election, the Northwest Manager of the Continental Casualty Company, David H. (D.H.) Evans, needed to put out a statement that he was a different person from the David H. Evans nominated for governor, and not to vote for him. During David H. Evans' previous campaign, voters who know D.H. Evans believed he was running, and voted for him.

== Results ==
1918 gubernatorial election, Minnesota
Party	Candidate	Votes	%	±%
Republican	J. A. A. Burnquist (incumbent)	166,515	42.73%	−20.21%
Farmer–Labor	David H. Evans	111,948	28.73%	n/a
Democratic	Fred Wheaton	76,793	19.71%	−4.13%
Socialist	L. P. Berot	7,794	2.00%	−4.73%
National	Olaf O. Stageberg	6,648	1.71%	n/a
Majority		54,567	14.00%	
Turnout		369,698		
Republican hold		Swing		

== See also ==
- List of Minnesota gubernatorial elections
