= 1920 Minnesota Attorney General election =

- November 2, 1920
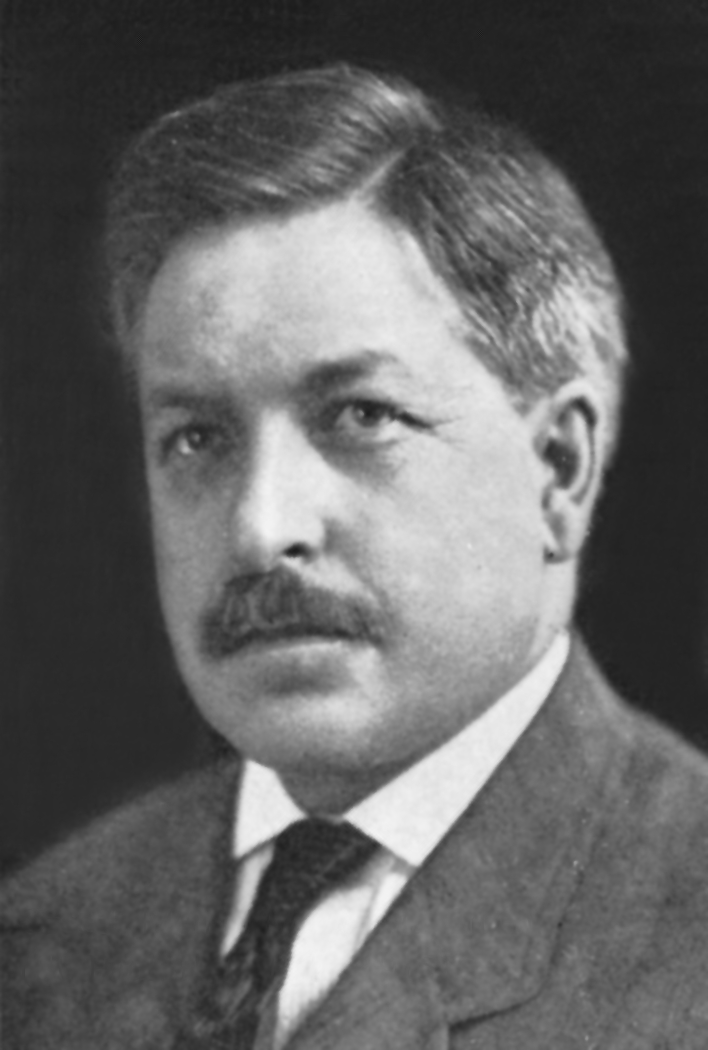

Nominee	Clifford L. Hilton	Thomas V. Sullivan	Raymond A. McQuat
Party	Republican	Independent	Democratic
Popular vote	446,736	251,488	53,738
Percentage	59.41%	33.44%	7.15%
Attorney General before election
Clifford L. Hilton
Republican
Elected Attorney General
Clifford L. Hilton
Republican

The 1920 Minnesota Attorney General election was held on November 2, 1920, in order to elect the attorney general of Minnesota. Republican nominee and incumbent attorney general Clifford L. Hilton defeated Independent candidate Thomas V. Sullivan and Democratic nominee Raymond A. McQuat.

== General election ==
On election day, November 2, 1920, Republican nominee Clifford L. Hilton won re-election by a margin of 195,248 votes against his foremost opponent Independent candidate Thomas V. Sullivan, thereby retaining Republican control over the office of attorney general. Hilton was sworn in for his second full term on January 3, 1921.

=== Results ===
Minnesota Attorney General election, 1920
Party	Candidate	Votes	%
Republican	Clifford L. Hilton (incumbent)	446,736	59.41
Independent	Thomas V. Sullivan	251,488	33.44
Democratic	Raymond A. McQuat	53,738	7.15
Total votes		751,962	100.00
Republican hold			
