= Harry H. Peterson =

American lawyer, judge and politician (1890-1985)

Henry H. Peterson
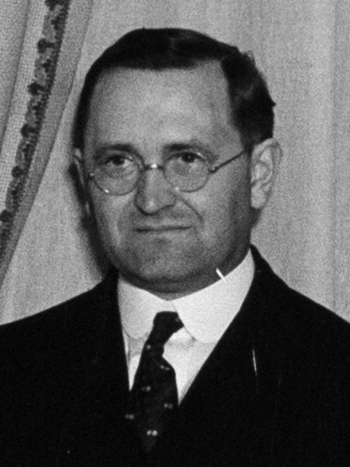
- Peterson in 1932

19th Minnesota Attorney General
- In office 1933–1936
- Governor: Floyd B. Olson
- Preceded by: Henry N. Benson
- Succeeded by: William S. Ervin

Personal details
- Born: Harry Herbert Peterson; April 12, 1890 Saint Paul, Minnesota, U.S.
- Died: January 23, 1985 (aged 94)
- Party: Democratic (DFL)
- Spouse: Mabel V. Norquist (m. 1916)
- Children: 2
- Parents: Swan Alfred Peterson (father); Mathilda Christina Gustafson (mother)
- Education: University of Minnesota Law School
- Profession: Lawyer, judge, politician

Harry Herbert Peterson (April 12, 1890 – January 23, 1985) was an American lawyer, judge and politician.

== Background ==
Peterson was born in Saint Paul, Minnesota. He was the son of Swan Alfred Peterson and Mathilda Christina (Gustafson) Peterson, both of whom were immigrants from Sweden. Peterson graduated from the University of Minnesota Law School in 1912 and entered private practice as an attorney at law in Ramsey County, Minnesota. He married Mabel V. Norquist (1893-1972) on June 28, 1916. They were the parents of two children.

== Career ==
He was elected Ramsey County Attorney to serve 1923–1924 and subsequently served as the Minnesota Attorney General during the Farmer-Labor administration of Floyd B. Olson, 1933–1936. During the Great Depression, Peterson drafted and subsequently defended the constitutionality of the Minnesota Mortgage Moratorium Act, a signature Depression-era reform which sustained the principle that States could adopt moratoria on bank foreclosures.

Peterson went from the Attorney General's office to the Minnesota Supreme Court serving there from 1938–1950, resigning to run for Minnesota Governor. Defeating Charles Halsted in the Democratic-Farmer-Labor Party primary election, he lost the 1950 general election to the Republican incumbent Luther Youngdahl.

Peterson's unsuccessful campaign centered around increasing tourism, fiscal conservatism, and shifting the tax burden from individuals to big businesses.

Upon retirement, Peterson was active in the formation of the Midwestern School of Law where he served as Dean prior to its reorganization as the Hamline University School of Law. Peterson donated his personal law library to the new school and served on its faculty, later dying of a stroke in 1985.

== Other sources ==
- Minnesota State Law Library Archive of Judicial Biographies

Legal offices
Preceded by Henry N. Benson	Minnesota Attorney General; 1933–1936	Succeeded by William S. Ervin
Party political offices
Preceded by Joseph B. Himsl	Farmer-Labor nominee for Attorney General of Minnesota; 1932, 1934, 1936	Succeeded by William S. Ervin
Preceded by Charles Halsted	Endorsed Gubernatorial Candidate, Minnesota DFL State Convention; 1950	Succeeded by Orville Freeman
Preceded by Charles Halsted	DFL nominee for Governor of Minnesota; 1950	Succeeded by Orville Freeman
