= David Evans (Minnesota politician) =

American politician (1852–1928)

David H. Evans
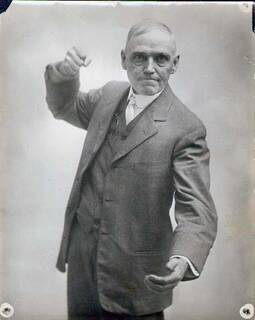
- Born: November 1, 1852; Utica, New York
- Died: May 25, 1928 (aged 75); Santa Ana, California
- Occupations: Politician, Hardware Merchant
- Years active: 1892-1918
- Political party: Minnesota Farmer-Labor Party

David H. Evans (November 1, 1852 – May 25, 1928) was a politician from the U.S. State of Minnesota. He was the first nominee to run for office from the Minnesota Farmer-Labor Party, being a gubernatorial candidate in 1918. He lost to incumbent Joseph A.A. Burnquist. He is known for his many electoral campaigns, none of which were successful.

== Biography ==
Evans was born in Utica, New York in 1852. In 1857, he moved with his parents to Minnesota. In 1878, he moved to Tracy, Minnesota.

=== Electoral Campaigns ===
Evans began politics as a member of the Prohibition Party. In 1892, he launched his first political campaign, for Minnesota State Treasurer. He finished with only 5.12%. In 1894, he ran for State Senate. He finished with 8.41%. In 1898, he ran for Minnesota's 2nd congressional district, on a fusion ticket between the Democrats and Populists. He finished with 39.59%. In 1900, he ran for the Minnesota House of Representatives. He finished with 20.47%. In 1906, he once again ran for State Treasurer.

Evans was nominated for Governor at the State Labor Convention. He initially ran under the Nonpartisan League, later changing to the 'Nonpartisan League and Labor Ticket', and finally the Farmer-Labor Party.

== Later Life ==
In 1927, he retired to Santa Ana, California. One year later, in 1928, he was killed in an auto mobile accident.

Party political offices
First	Farmer–Labor nominee for Governor of Minnesota; 1918	Succeeded by Magnus Johnson (1922)
