= Konrad K. Solberg =

American politician

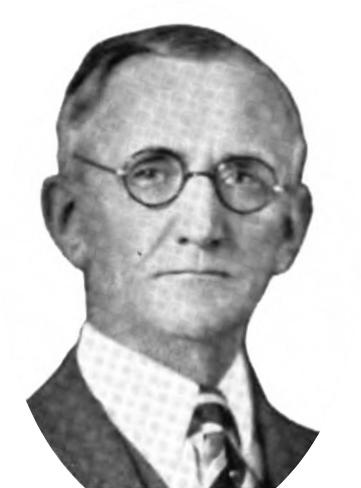
- Solberg c. 1933

27th Lieutenant Governor of Minnesota
- In office January 3, 1933 – January 8, 1935
- Governor: Floyd B. Olson
- Preceded by: Henry M. Arens
- Succeeded by: Hjalmar Petersen

Member of the Minnesota Senate from the 13th district
- In office January 1, 1923 – January 4, 1931
- Preceded by: James H. Hall
- Succeeded by: Emil L. Regnier

Personal details
- Born: June 25, 1874 Rushford, Minnesota, U.S.
- Died: January 28, 1954 (aged 79) Clarkfield, Minnesota, U.S.
- Party: Minnesota Farmer-Labor Party
- Profession: Farmer, legislator

Konrad Knute Solberg (June 25, 1874 – January 28, 1954) was an American farmer and legislator who served as the 27th lieutenant governor of Minnesota from 1933 to 1935.

== Background ==
Solberg was born in Rushford, Minnesota. He was the son of Knute Solberg and Aasild (Haugen) Solberg, both Norwegian immigrants born in Treungen in Telemark. His family moved to Yellow Medicine County, Minnesota when he was five years old. Solberg was a farmer and merchant. He became Vice President of the Farmers and Merchants State Bank. He was later made a Director of the Clarkfield Telephone Company. He was a member of the Clarkfield Norwegian Lutheran church.

== Career ==
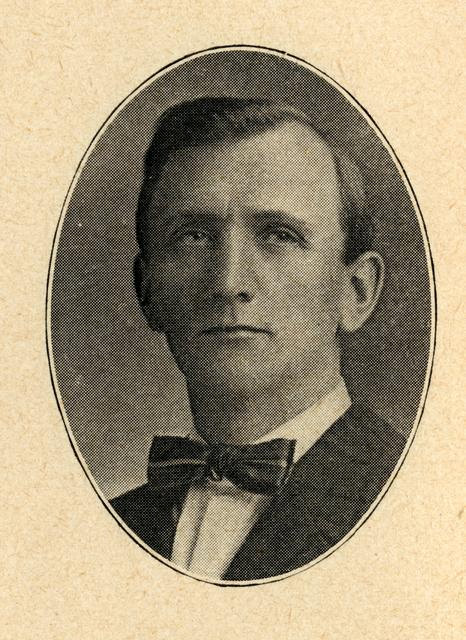
Solberg's official State Senate portrait, 1923

Solberg was a member of the Farmer-Labor Party. He first entered political office serving as Town Supervisor of Clarkfield, Minnesota. He later became a member of the School Board and served as School District Clerk of public schools in Clarkfield, Minnesota. He served as a Minnesota legislator in the Minnesota Senate during the 43rd – 46th Legislative Sessions (1/2/1923 -1/5/1931).

in February 1927, as a state senator, Solberg introduced a piece of anti-evolution legislation to the Senate. The bill aimed to prohibit the teaching of evolution in all public schools and colleges in Minnesota. It was later referred to the committee on education. A similar bill was introduced in the house by Hemming S. Nelson of Lake Lillian. The bill failed a vote in March 1927.

Solberg became Lieutenant Governor under Governor Floyd B. Olson from January 3, 1933 – January 8, 1935. He did not serve a second term as lieutenant governor so he could run for Minnesota Secretary of State. He would not be successful.

== Personal life ==
In 1897, he was united in marriage to Sophie Swenson Aas (1874-1953). They were the parents of nine children. He died in 1954 in Clarkfield, Minnesota and was buried in the Clarkfield Lutheran Cemetery.

Party political offices
Preceded by Henry M. Arens	Farmer–Labor nominee for Lieutenant Governor of Minnesota; 1932	Succeeded by Hjalmar Petersen
Preceded by John T. Lyons	Farmer–Labor nominee for Minnesota Secretary of State; 1934	Succeeded by Paul C. Hartig
Political offices
Preceded by Henry M. Arens	Lieutenant Governor of Minnesota; 1933–1935	Succeeded by Hjalmar Petersen
