= 1938 Minnesota lieutenant gubernatorial election =

Minnesota lieutenant gubernatorial election, 1938
- November 8, 1938
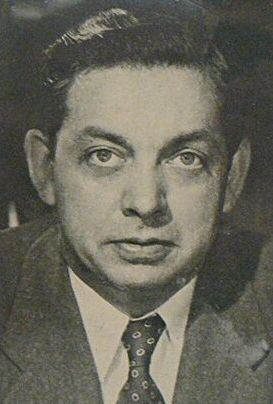

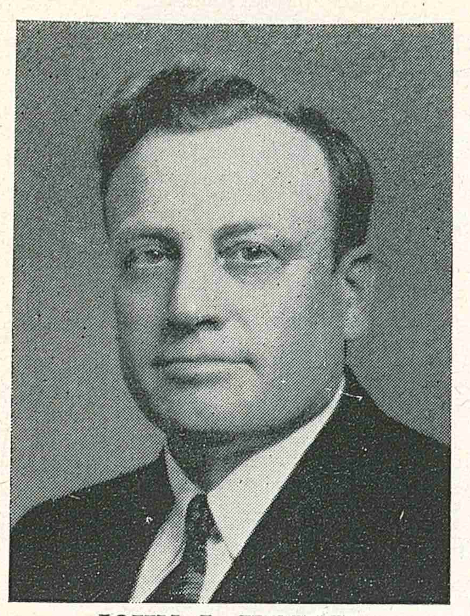

Nominee	C. Elmer Anderson	John J. Kinzer	Ray M. Lang
Party	Republican	Farmer–Labor	Democratic
Popular vote	590,404	374,577	113,483
Percentage	54.74%	34.73%	10.52%
Lieutenant Governor before election
Gottfrid Lindsten
Farmer–Labor
Elected Lieutenant Governor
C. Elmer Anderson
Republican

The 1938 Minnesota lieutenant gubernatorial election took place on November 8, 1938. Republican Party of Minnesota candidate C. Elmer Anderson defeated Minnesota Farmer–Labor Party challenger John J. Kinzer and Minnesota Democratic Party candidate Ray M. Lang.

== Results ==
1938 lieutenant gubernatorial election, Minnesota
Party	Candidate	Votes	%	±%
Republican	C. Elmer Anderson	590,404	54.74%	+16.67%
Farmer–Labor	John J. Kinzer	374,577	34.73%	−12.73%
Democratic	Ray M. Lang	113,483	10.52%	−3.95%
Majority		215,827	20.01%	
Turnout		1,078,464		
Republican gain from Farmer–Labor		Swing		
