= Roy C. Smelker =

American politician

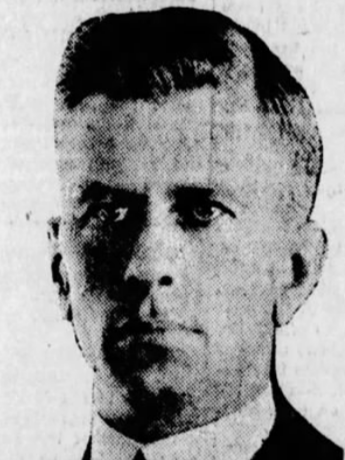
- Born: March 7, 1875; Iowa County, Wisconsin
- Died: 13 August 1959
- Occupation: Wisconsin State Assembly

Roy C. Smelker (March 7, 1875 – August 13, 1959) was a member of the Wisconsin State Assembly.

== Biography ==
Smelker was born on March 7, 1875, in Iowa County, Wisconsin. He graduated from high school in Dodgeville, Wisconsin in 1892 and from what is now the University of Wisconsin–Madison in 1897. During the Spanish–American War, he served in the United States Army. Afterwards, he graduated from the University of Wisconsin Law School in 1899 and operated a law firm with his father.

== Political career ==
Smelker was a member of the Wisconsin Assembly during the 1903 and 1905 sessions. He was a Republican. He later relocated to Minnesota, where he was the first secretary of the Minnesota Farmer–Labor Party.
