= 1934 Minnesota Secretary of State election =

- November 6, 1934
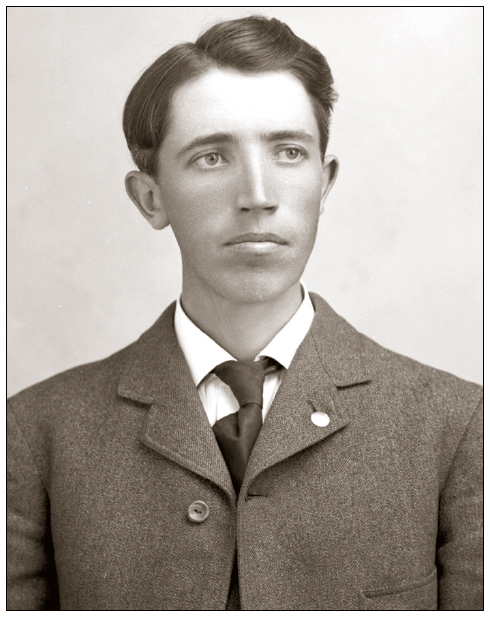

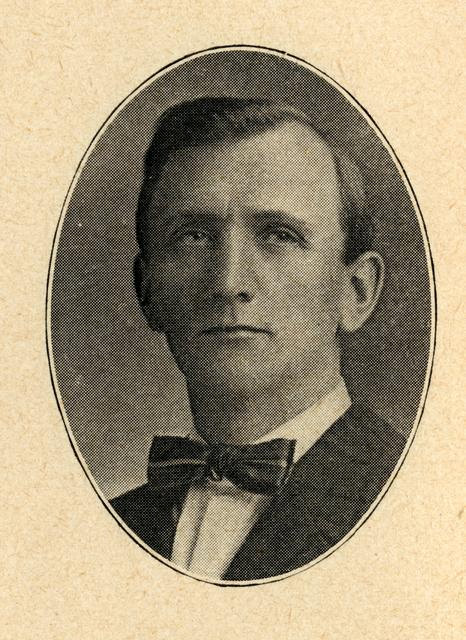

Nominee	Mike Holm	Konrad K. Solberg	Hugh T. Kennedy
Party	Republican	Farmer–Labor	Democratic
Popular vote	477,573	359,322	170,545
Percentage	47.13%	35.46%	16.83%
Secretary of State before election
Mike Holm
Republican
Elected Secretary of State
Mike Holm
Republican

The 1934 Minnesota Secretary of State election was held on November 6, 1934, in order to elect the Secretary of State of Minnesota. Republican nominee and incumbent Secretary of State Mike Holm defeated Farmer–Labor nominee and incumbent lieutenant governor of Minnesota Konrad K. Solberg, Democratic nominee Hugh T. Kennedy and Communist nominee Robert Turner.

== General election ==
On election day, November 6, 1934, Republican nominee Mike Holm won re-election by a margin of 118,251 votes against his foremost opponent Farmer–Labor nominee Konrad K. Solberg, thereby retaining Republican control over the office of Secretary of State. Holm was sworn in for his eighth term on January 7, 1935.

=== Results ===
Minnesota Secretary of State election, 1934
Party	Candidate	Votes	%
Republican	Mike Holm (incumbent)	477,573	47.13
Farmer–Labor	Konrad K. Solberg	359,322	35.46
Democratic	Hugh T. Kennedy	170,545	16.83
Communist	Robert Turner	5,791	0.58
Total votes		1,013,231	100.00
Republican hold			
