= Albert F. Pratt =

American politician

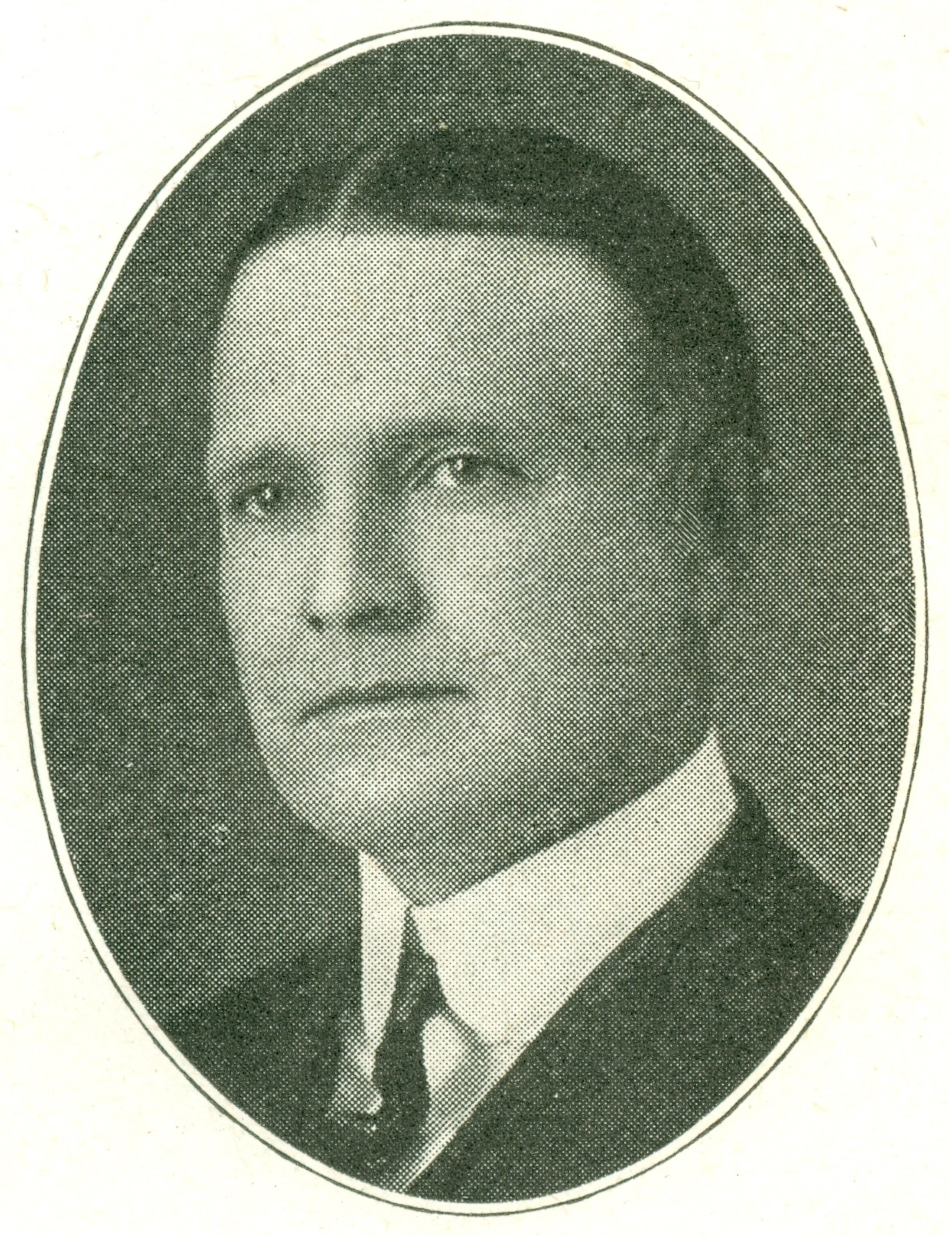
Albert F. Pratt

Albert Fuller Pratt (January 2, 1872 – January 28, 1928) was a Minnesota lawyer and politician.

Pratt was born on a farm in 1872 in Anoka County, Minnesota, where he was raised. He graduated from the University of Minnesota Law School in 1895. Pratt served with the 14th Minnesota Volunteer Infantry as a first lieutenant in the Spanish–American War and was a major in the Minnesota National Guard, 3rd Infantry for 28 years. Pratt served as county attorney for Anoka County from 1899 to 1914.

Pratt served in the Minnesota House of Representatives from January 5, 1915, to January 6, 1919. In 1914, he was elected in a nonpartisan election to the 39th Legislative Session from District 44, which included Anoka and Isanti counties. He served as chair of the committee on State Hospitals. Elected in 1916 to the 40th Legislative Session, he served as chair of the Judiciary committee.

Pratt served as Minnesota Attorney General from December 21, 1927, to January 28, 1928. He died in Anoka County.

Legal offices
Preceded by Clifford L. Hilton	Minnesota Attorney General; 1927–1928	Succeeded by G. Aaron Youngquist
