= 1934 Minnesota Attorney General election =

- November 6, 1934
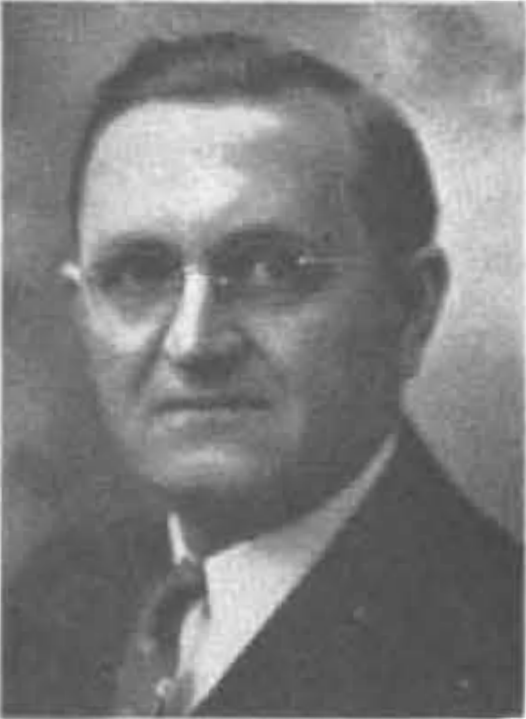

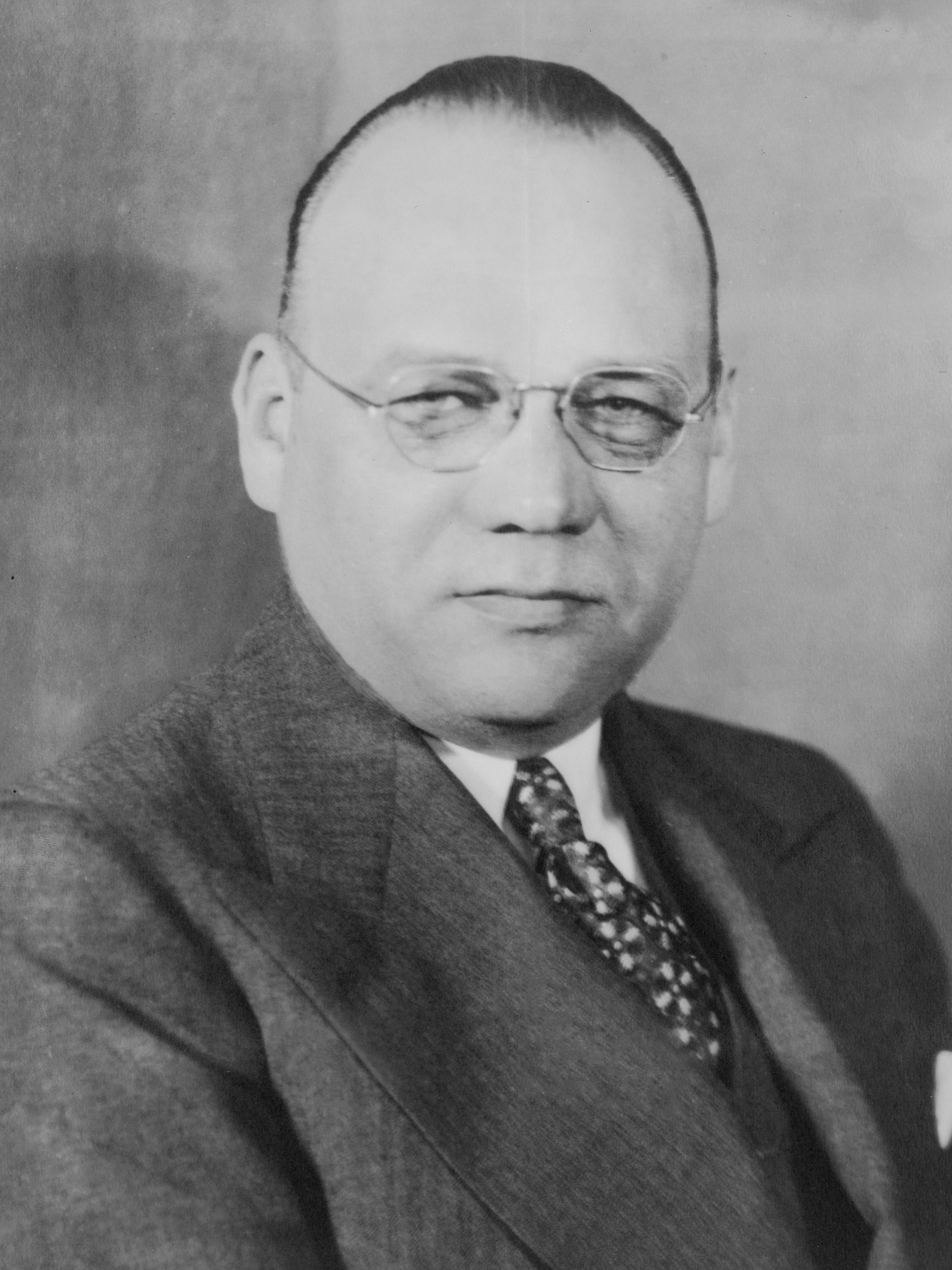

| Nominee | Harry H. Peterson | Oscar Youngdahl | Alric Anderson |
| Party | Farmer–Labor | Republican | Democratic |
| Popular vote | 436,140 | 345,372 | 190,049 |
| Percentage | 44.89% | 35.55% | 19.56% |
Attorney General before election
Harry H. Peterson
Farmer–Labor
Elected Attorney General
Harry H. Peterson
Farmer–Labor

The 1934 Minnesota Attorney General election was held on November 6, 1934, in order to elect the attorney general of Minnesota. Farmer–Labor nominee and incumbent attorney general Harry H. Peterson defeated Republican nominee Oscar Youngdahl and Democratic nominee Alric Anderson.

== General election ==
On election day, November 6, 1934, Farmer–Labor nominee Harry H. Peterson won re-election by a margin of 90,768 votes against his foremost opponent Republican nominee Oscar Youngdahl, thereby retaining Farmer–Labor control over the office of attorney general. Peterson was sworn in for his second term on January 2, 1935.

=== Results ===
Minnesota Attorney General election, 1934
| Party | Candidate | Votes | % |
|---|---|---|---|
| Farmer–Labor | Harry H. Peterson (incumbent) | 436,140 | 44.89 |
| Republican | Oscar Youngdahl | 345,372 | 35.55 |
| Democratic | Alric Anderson | 190,049 | 19.56 |
| Total votes | | 971,561 | 100.00 |
| Farmer–Labor hold | | | |
