= 1932 Minnesota lieutenant gubernatorial election =

Minnesota lieutenant gubernatorial election, 1932
- November 8, 1932
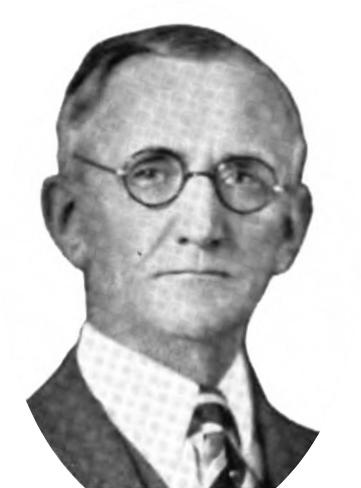

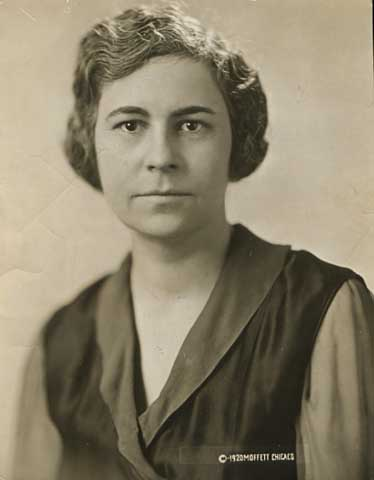
Nominee	Konrad K. Solberg	Theodore G. Streissguth	Ruth Hayes Carpenter
Party	Farmer–Labor	Republican	Democratic
Popular vote	429,759	314,369	193,671
Percentage	45.34%	33.16%	20.43%
Lieutenant Governor before election
Henry M. Arens
Farmer–Labor
Elected Lieutenant Governor
Konrad K. Solberg
Farmer–Labor

The 1932 Minnesota lieutenant gubernatorial election took place on November 8, 1932. Minnesota Farmer–Labor Party candidate Konrad K. Solberg defeated Republican Party of Minnesota challenger Theodore G. Streissguth and Minnesota Democratic Party candidate Ruth Hayes Carpenter.

== Results ==
1932 lieutenant gubernatorial election, Minnesota
Party	Candidate	Votes	%	±%
Farmer–Labor	Konrad K. Solberg	429,759	45.34%	−4.98%
Republican	Theodore G. Streissguth	314,369	33.16%	−14.47%
Democratic	Ruth Hayes Carpenter	193,671	20.43%	n/a
Communist	John Lindman	10,159	1.07%	−1.62%
Majority		115,390	12.18%	
Turnout		947,958		
Farmer–Labor hold		Swing		
