= Willard F. Bennett =

American politician (1887–1970)

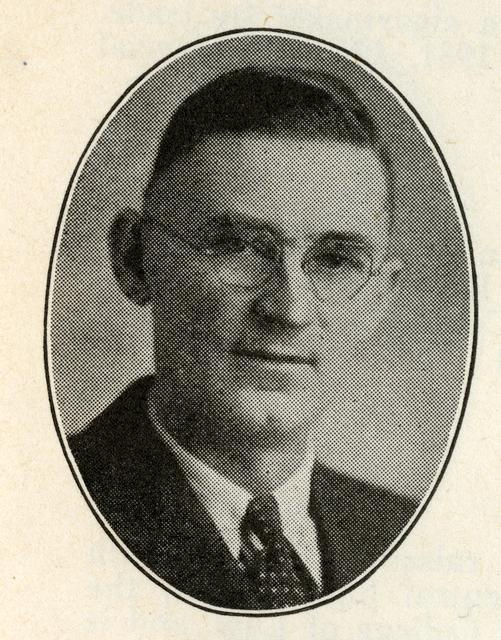
Bennett c. 1935

Willard F. Bennett, Sr. (April 4, 1887 - June 29, 1970) also known as W. F. Bennett, was an American interior decorator and trade union activist from Minneapolis, Minnesota who served five two-year terms from 1933 to 1943 as a member of the Minnesota House of Representatives, representing the 35th district (part of Hennepin County). He was a member of the Minnesota Farmer-Labor Party.

Bennett had worked as a business agent for the International Union of Painters and Allied Trades, and at the time of his death was the senior member of his union local.
