= 1940 Minnesota Attorney General election =

- November 5, 1940
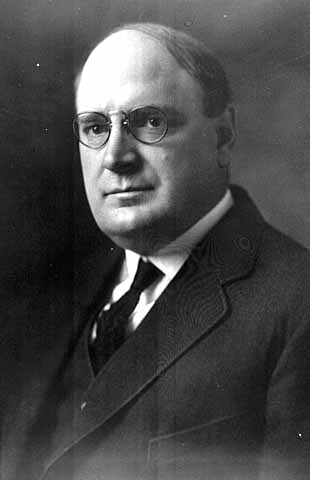

Nominee	Joseph A. A. Burnquist	David J. Erickson	John D. Sullivan
Party	Republican	Farmer–Labor	Democratic
Popular vote	604,763	284,337	278,750
Percentage	51.78%	24.35%	23.87%
Attorney General before election
Joseph A. A. Burnquist
Republican
Elected Attorney General
Joseph A. A. Burnquist
Republican

The 1940 Minnesota Attorney General election was held on November 5, 1940, in order to elect the attorney general of Minnesota. Republican nominee and incumbent attorney general Joseph A. A. Burnquist defeated Farmer–Labor nominee David J. Erickson and Democratic nominee John D. Sullivan.

== General election ==
On election day, November 5, 1940, Republican nominee Joseph A. A. Burnquist won re-election by a margin of 320,426 votes against his foremost opponent Farmer–Labor nominee David J. Erickson, thereby retaining Republican control over the office of attorney general. Burnquist was sworn in for his second term on January 6, 1941.

=== Results ===
Minnesota Attorney General election, 1940
Party	Candidate	Votes	%
Republican	Joseph A. A. Burnquist (incumbent)	604,763	51.78
Farmer–Labor	David J. Erickson	284,337	24.35
Democratic	John D. Sullivan	278,750	23.87
Total votes		1,167,850	100.00
Republican hold			
