= 1942 Minnesota Attorney General election =

- November 3, 1942
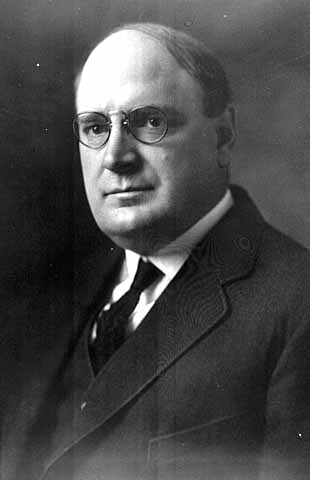

Nominee	Joseph A. A. Burnquist	David J. Erickson	Patrick A. Burke
Party	Republican	Farmer–Labor	Democratic
Popular vote	432,695	187,074	114,385
Percentage	58.94%	25.48%	15.58%
Attorney General before election
Joseph A. A. Burnquist
Republican
Elected Attorney General
Joseph A. A. Burnquist
Republican

The 1942 Minnesota Attorney General election was held on November 3, 1942, in order to elect the attorney general of Minnesota. Republican nominee and incumbent attorney general Joseph A. A. Burnquist defeated Farmer–Labor nominee David J. Erickson and Democratic nominee Patrick A. Burke.

== General election ==
On election day, November 3, 1942, Republican nominee Joseph A. A. Burnquist won re-election by a margin of 245,621 votes against his foremost opponent Farmer–Labor nominee David J. Erickson, thereby retaining Republican control over the office of attorney general. Burnquist was sworn in for his third term on January 4, 1943.

=== Results ===
Minnesota Attorney General election, 1942
Party	Candidate	Votes	%
Republican	Joseph A. A. Burnquist (incumbent)	432,695	58.94
Farmer–Labor	David J. Erickson	187,074	25.48
Democratic	Patrick A. Burke	114,385	15.58
Total votes		734,154	100.00
Republican hold			
