= Samuel H. Bellman =

American politician

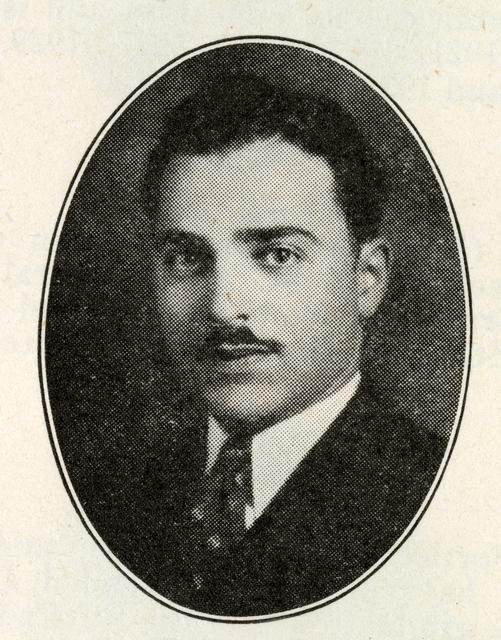
Bellman c. 1935

Samuel H. Bellman (August 16, 1906 – January 12, 1999) was an American lawyer and politician.

Bellman was born in New York City. He lived in Minneapolis and graduated from Minneapolis North High School. He went to Columbia University and then received his law degree from the University of Minnesota Law School. Bellman lived in Minneapolis with his wife and family and practiced law in Minneapolis. Bellman was a member of the Minnesota Farmer–Labor Party and served in the Minnesota House of Representatives from 1935 to 1938. He was the first Jewish person to be elected to the Minnesota state legislature. He died at Park Shore Assisted Living in St. Louis Park, Minnesota. Bellman's grandson is Democratic US Representative Jamie Raskin of Maryland.
