= John J. Kinzer =

American farmer and politician (1891-1986)

John Kinzer
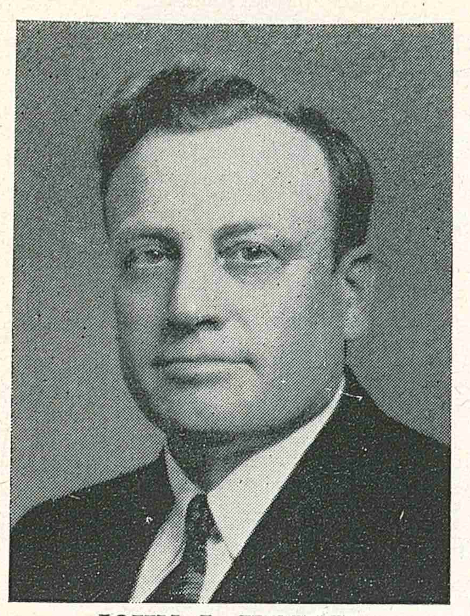

Member of the Minnesota House of Representatives from the 46th district
- In office 1935-1938, 1941-1964

Personal details
- Born: January 28, 1891
- Died: June 11, 1986 (aged 95)
- Party: Democratic Farmer-Labor
- Children: 14
- Occupation: Dairy farmer

John J. Kinzer (January 28, 1891 – June 11, 1986) was an American farmer and politician.

Kinzer was born on a farm in Cold Spring, Stearns County, Minnesota. He went to the Wakefield Township public schools. He lived on a farm in Cold Spring, Minnesota, with his wife and family. Kinzer served as the Cold Spring Township treasurer and was a Democrat. He served in the Minnesota House of Representatives from 1935 to 1938 and from 1941 to 1964.

Party political offices
Preceded by Gottfrid Lindsten	Farmer–Labor nominee for Lieutenant Governor of Minnesota; 1938	Succeeded by Howard Y. Williams
