= G. Aaron Youngquist =

American politician

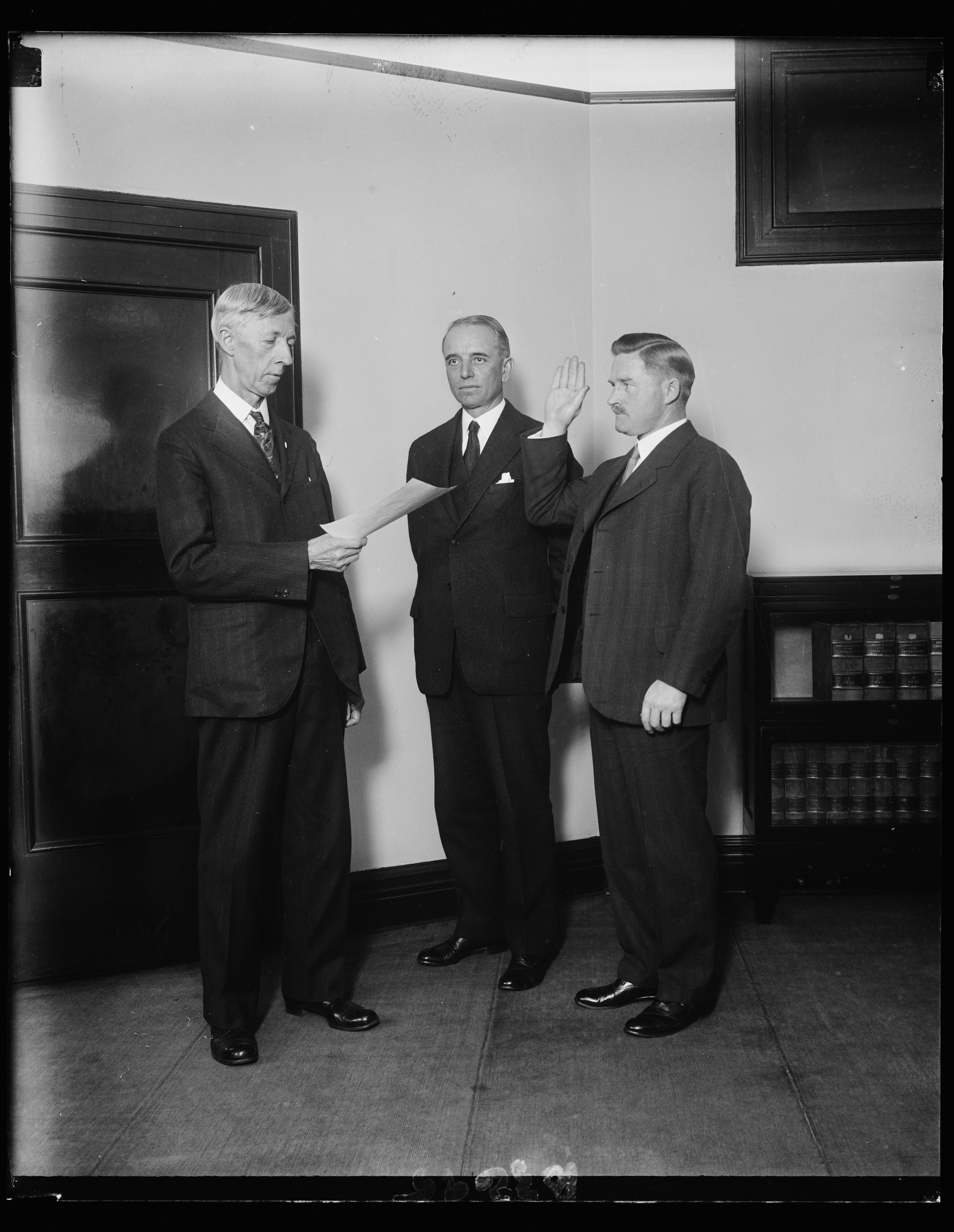
- G.A. Youngquist being sworn in by Attorney General William D. Mitchell

17th Minnesota Attorney General
- In office 1928–1929

United States Assistant Attorney General
- In office 1929–1933

Personal details
- Born: Gustav Aaron Youngquist; November 4, 1885 Gothenburg, Sweden
- Died: October 29, 1959 (aged 73) Minneapolis, Minnesota
- Education: William Mitchell College of Law

Gustav Aaron Youngquist (4 November 1885 – 29 October 1959) was a Swedish-American lawyer and public prosecutor. He served as Minnesota Attorney General and as the Assistant U.S. Attorney General who successfully prosecuted Al Capone for federal income tax evasion.

== Early life and education ==
Youngquist was born near Gothenburg, Sweden, and moved to the United States as a small child with his family. He enrolled at William Mitchell College of Law (then the St. Paul College of Law) and graduated in 1909.

== Career ==
Following graduation, he entered into partnership with Charles Loring, a future Chief Justice of the Minnesota Supreme Court. Youngquist served as Polk County attorney (1915-1918). Later, he successfully ran for the offices of the Attorney for Carver County. In February 1928, he was appointed Minnesota Attorney General by Governor Theodore Christianson to fill the vacancy caused by the death of Albert F. Pratt.

In 1929, the state Republican Party tried to draft Youngquist as their gubernatorial candidate for the next year's election. Instead, U.S. Attorney General William D. Mitchell convinced Youngquist to accept a position at the Department of Justice, where he was charged with enforcing national prohibition laws of the Volstead Act. He remained there until 1933, having argued between sixty and seventy cases before the U.S. Supreme Court and overseen the trial and sentencing of Al Capone. Youngquist practiced actively following his return to Minnesota. He also served on the U.S. Supreme Court's Advisory Committee on the Rules of Federal Criminal Procedure.

Party political offices
Preceded by Clifford L. Hilton	Republican nominee for Attorney General of Minnesota; 1928	Succeeded by Henry N. Benson
Legal offices
Preceded by Albert F. Pratt	Minnesota Attorney General; 1928–1929	Succeeded by Henry N. Benson
