= Theodore G. Streissguth =

American businessman and politician (1855–1915)

Theodore G. Streissguth (August 10, 1855 – October 3, 1915) was an American businessman and politician.

== Biography ==
Streissguth was born on August 10, 1855, in New Glarus, Wisconsin. He went to the private and public schools in Fond du Lac, Wisconsin and Milwaukee, Wisconsin. Streissguth moved to Minnesota and then settled in Arlington, Sibley County, Minnesota in 1878. Streissguth lived in Arlington, Minnesota with his wife and family and was a merchant. He served on the Arlington Village Council and on the Arlington Board of Education. Streissguth served in the Minnesota Senate from 1891 to 1894. Streissguth died on October 3, 1915, aged 59, from cancer.

Party political offices
Preceded by John H. Hougen	Republican nominee for Lieutenant Governor of Minnesota; 1932	Succeeded by Franklin Ellsworth
