= Norseland, Minnesota =

Norseland
- Unincorporated community
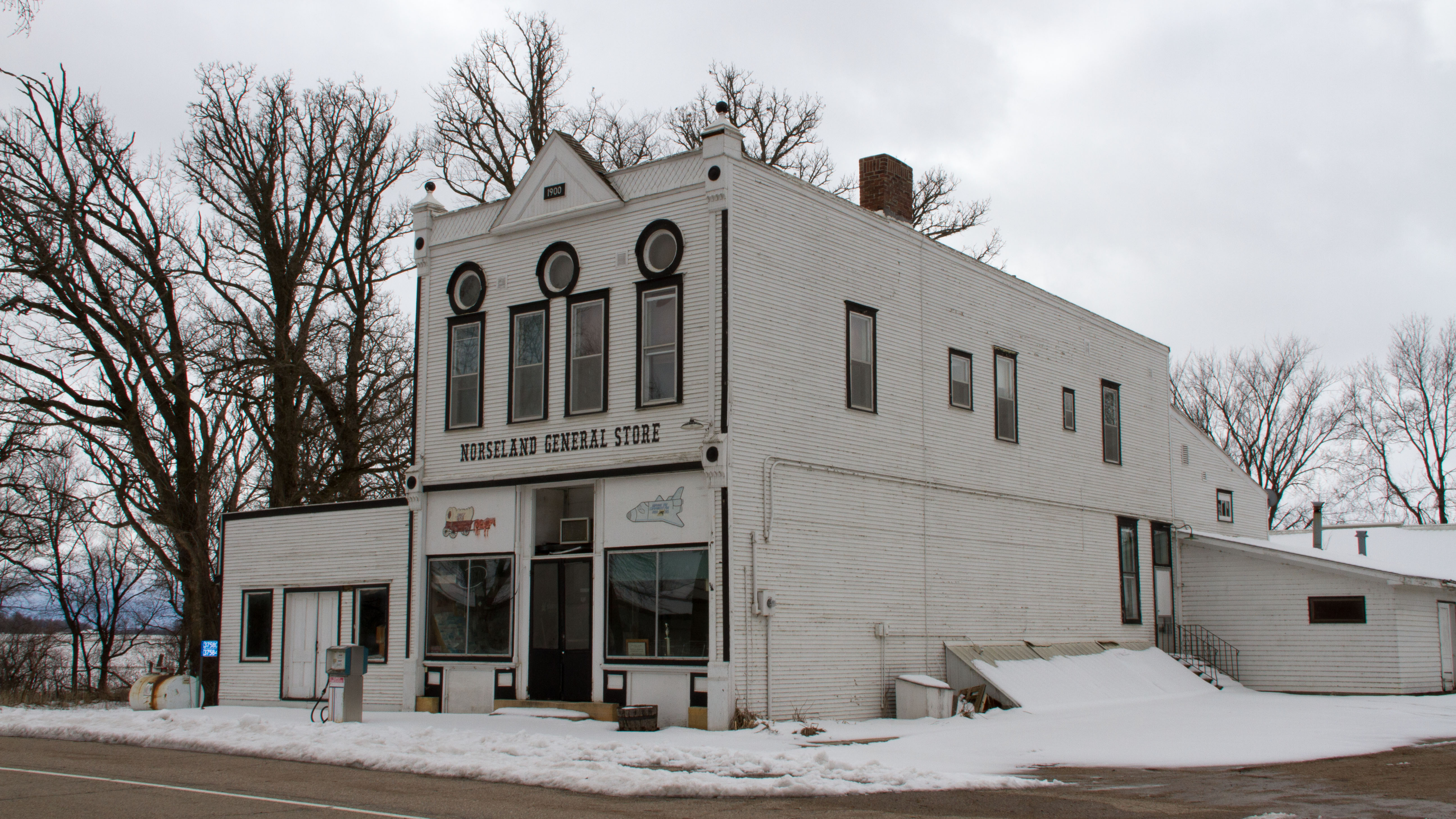
- The Norseland General Store, built circa 1900

- Location within Minnesota Location within the United States
- Coordinates: 44°24′46″N 94°07′00″W
- Country: United States
- State: Minnesota
- County: Nicollet
- Township: Lake Prairie Township
- Elevation: 1,004 ft (306 m)
- Time zone: UTC-6 (Central (CST))
  - Summer (DST): UTC-5 (CDT)
- ZIP code: 56082
- Area code: 507
- GNIS feature ID: 654849

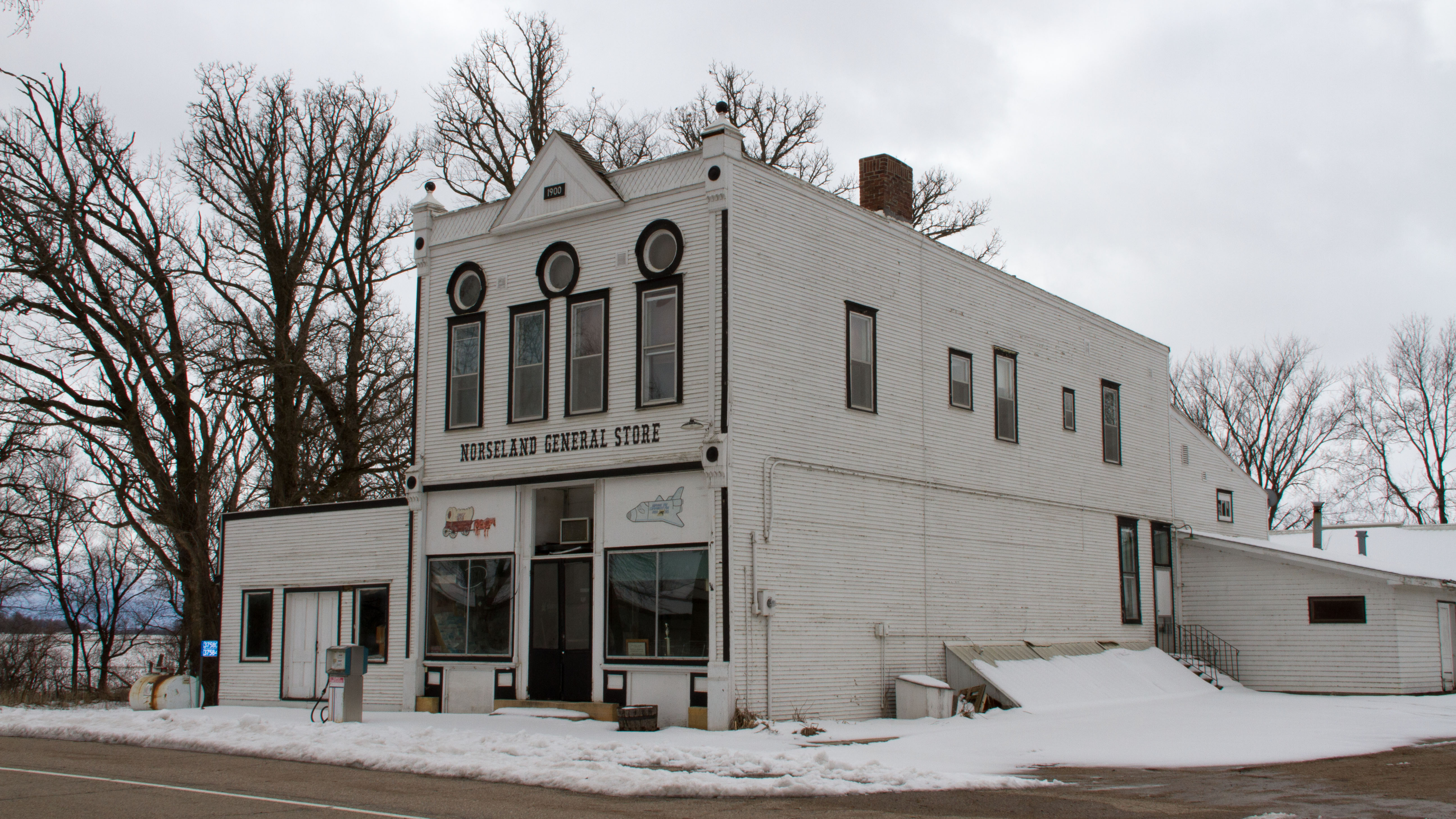
The Norseland General Store, built in 1900 and tracing back to an original store in 1858, is listed on the National Register of Historic Places.

Norseland is an unincorporated community in Lake Prairie Township, Nicollet County, Minnesota, United States, near St. Peter. It is near the junction of State Highway 22 (MN 22) and Nicollet County Road 52.

== Notable person ==
- Henry N. Benson, Minnesota lawyer and politician, was born in Norseland.
