= Henry N. Benson =

American lawyer and politician

Henry Nathaniel Benson, Sr.
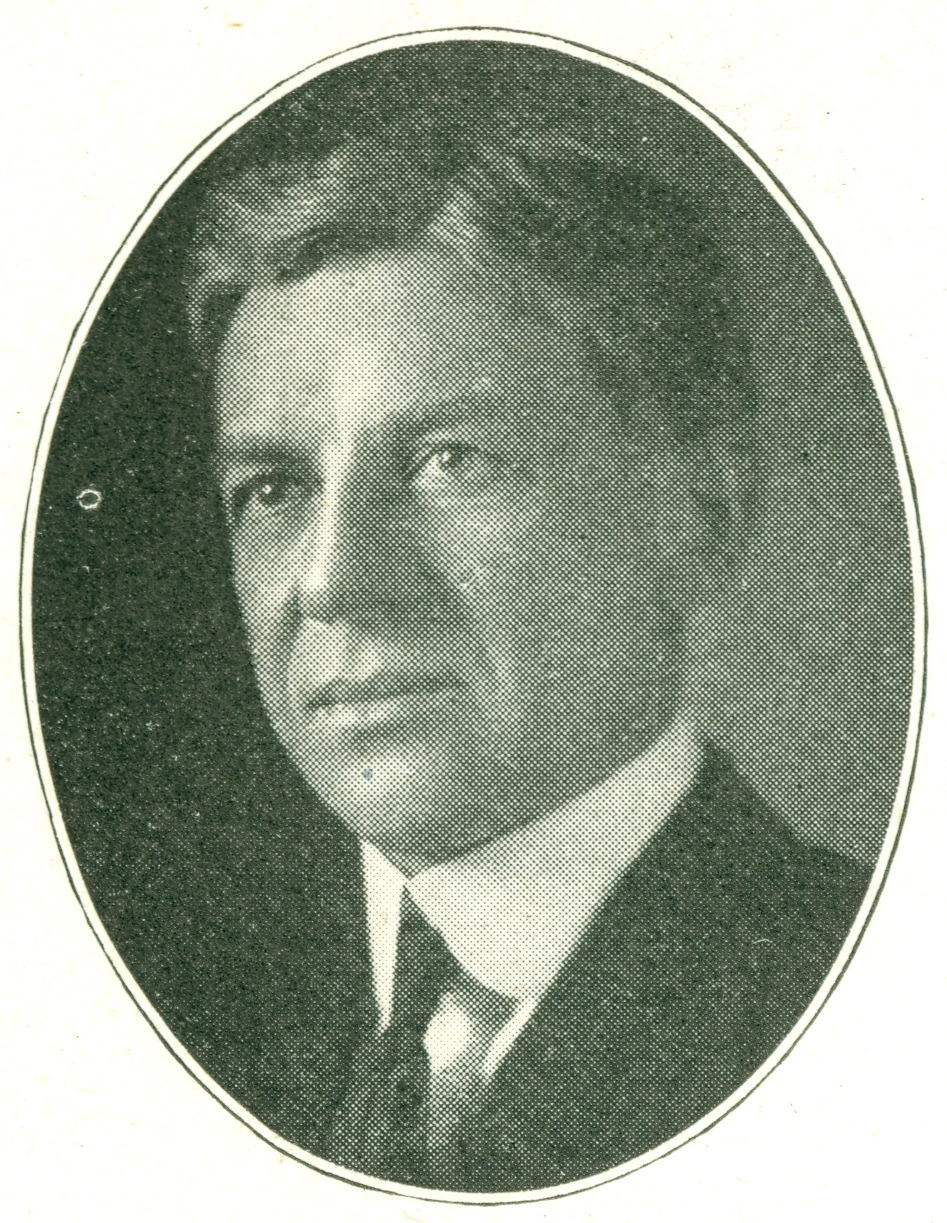
- Henry N. Benson
- Born: August 1, 1872; Norseland, Minnesota, U.S.
- Died: May 10, 1960 (aged 88); St. Peter, Minnesota, U.S.
- Education: Gustavus Adolphus College (BA); University of Minnesota, Twin Cities (JD)
- Occupations: Lawyer, Politician
- Known for: American lawyer and politician
- Office: Minnesota Attorney General
- Political party: Republican

Henry Nathaniel Benson, Sr. (August 1, 1872 – May 10, 1960) was an American lawyer and politician. He served as Minnesota Attorney General from 1929 to 1933.

Benson was born in Norseland, Nicollet County, Minnesota. He was the son of Peter Benson and Malena (Pehrson) Benson. Benson received his bachelor's degree from Gustavus Adolphus College in 1893 and his Juris Doctor degree from University of Minnesota Law School in 1895. He then practiced law in St. Peter, Minnesota. Benson served as St. Peter city attorney and Nicollet County probate judge. Benson was active in the Republican Party. He served in the Minnesota State Senate from 1911 to 1923. Benson then served as Minnesota Attorney General from 1929 to 1933. He then continued his law practice in St. Peter, Minnesota. He was also chairman of the Committee for the Augustana Pension Fund and President of the Lutheran Brotherhood of the Augustana Lutheran Church.

Benson died in a hospital in St. Peter, Minnesota from complications from a hip fracture and surgery.

== Notes ==
Party political offices
Preceded by G. Aaron Youngquist	Republican nominee for Attorney General of Minnesota; 1930, 1932	Succeeded by Oscar Youngdahl
Legal offices
Preceded by G. Aaron Youngquist	Minnesota Attorney General; 1929–1933	Succeeded by Harry H. Peterson
