= Clifford L. Hilton =

American judge

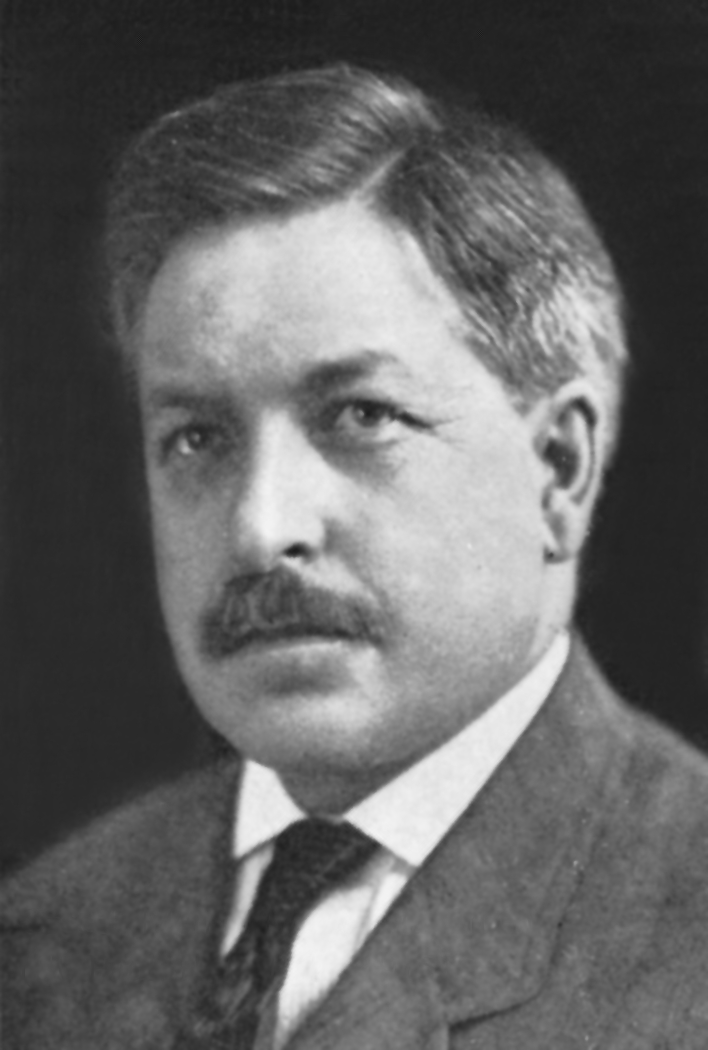
Clifford L. Hilton

Clifford L. Hilton (December 6, 1866 – April 5, 1946) was an American lawyer.

Born in Kenyon, Minnesota, Hilton moved to Fergus Falls, Minnesota in 1879 and graduated from Fergus Falls High School. He received his law degree from University of Wisconsin Law School and was admitted to the Minnesota and Wisconsin bars. He served as city attorney for Fergus Falls, Minnesota and county attorney for Otter Tail County, Minnesota. He was also Minnesota deputy attorney general. Hilton served as Minnesota Attorney General from 1918 to 1928. Hilton then served on the Minnesota Supreme Court from 1928 to 1943. Hilton died in Florida.

Party political offices
Preceded by Lyndon A. Smith	Republican nominee for Attorney General of Minnesota; 1918, 1920, 1922, 1924, 1926	Succeeded by G. Aaron Youngquist
Legal offices
Preceded by Lyndon A. Smith	Minnesota Attorney General; 1918–1927	Succeeded by Albert F. Pratt
