= SMS Leopard (1885) =

Torpedo cruiser of the Austro-Hungarian Navy

- Leopard, date unknown

History

Austro-Hungarian Empire
- Name: Leopard
- Laid down: January 1885
- Launched: 10 September 1885
- Completed: 31 March 1886
- Fate: Broken up, 1920

General characteristics
- Class & type: Panther-class cruiser
- Displacement: 1,557 long tons (1,582 t)
- Length: 73.19 m (240 ft 1 in)
- Beam: 10.39 m (34 ft 1 in)
- Draft: 4.28 m (14 ft 1 in)
- Installed power: 6 × fire-tube boilers; 6,380 indicated horsepower (4,760 kW)
- Propulsion: 2 × compound steam engines; 2 × screw propellers
- Speed: 18.7 knots (34.6 km/h; 21.5 mph)
- Range: 2,800 nmi (5,200 km; 3,200 mi) at 10 knots (19 km/h; 12 mph)
- Crew: 186
- Armament: 2 × 12 cm (4.7 in) guns; 4 × 47 mm (1.9 in) quick-firing guns; 6 × 47 mm (1.9 in) revolver cannon; 4 × 14 in (356 mm) torpedo tubes
- Armor: Deck: 12 mm (0.47 in)

SMS Leopard was a torpedo cruiser (Torpedoschiff) of the Austro-Hungarian Navy. She and her sister ship, SMS Panther, were part of a program to build up Austria-Hungary's fleet of torpedo craft in the 1880s. Both ships, the only members of the Panther class, were built in Britain at the Armstrong shipyard in Elswick. Leopard was laid down in January 1885, launched in September 1885, and completed in March 1886. She was armed with a battery of two 12 cm (4.7 in) guns and ten 47 mm (1.9 in) guns, along with four 356 mm (14 in) torpedo tubes.

Leopard spent much of her career in the main Austro-Hungarian fleet. During this period, she visited Spain for the 1888 Barcelona Universal Exposition, and took part in an international naval demonstration off Crete in 1897 in an attempt to limit the Greco-Turkish War. From 1900, Leopard made two major overseas deployments, including a tour of the Pacific Ocean in 1900–1901, and a stint in the East Asia squadron in 1907–1909. Upon returning to Austria-Hungary, the ship was modernized in 1910 and then decommissioned in May 1914, shortly before the start of World War I in July. The ship was immediately reactivated and stationed in Pola as a guard ship, where she remained for the duration of the conflict. After Austria-Hungary's defeat, Leopard was ceded to Britain as a war prize and sold to ship breakers in Italy in 1920.

== Design ==
In the early 1880s, Vizeadmiral (Vice Admiral) Maximilian Daublebsky von Sterneck pressed for new naval construction to strengthen the chronically neglected Austro-Hungarian Navy, but realizing that new ironclad battleships could not be built given the parliaments' unwillingness to fund such expensive projects, he requested a pair of small protected cruisers. These ships would be used defensively against the larger and more expensive ironclads possessed by Austria-Hungary's rivals. Because the small Austro-Hungarian shipbuilding industry lacked experience building modern cruising vessels, the contracts for the new ships were given to Armstrong in the United Kingdom, though the experience the navy gained was used to build the follow-on cruiser Tiger domestically.

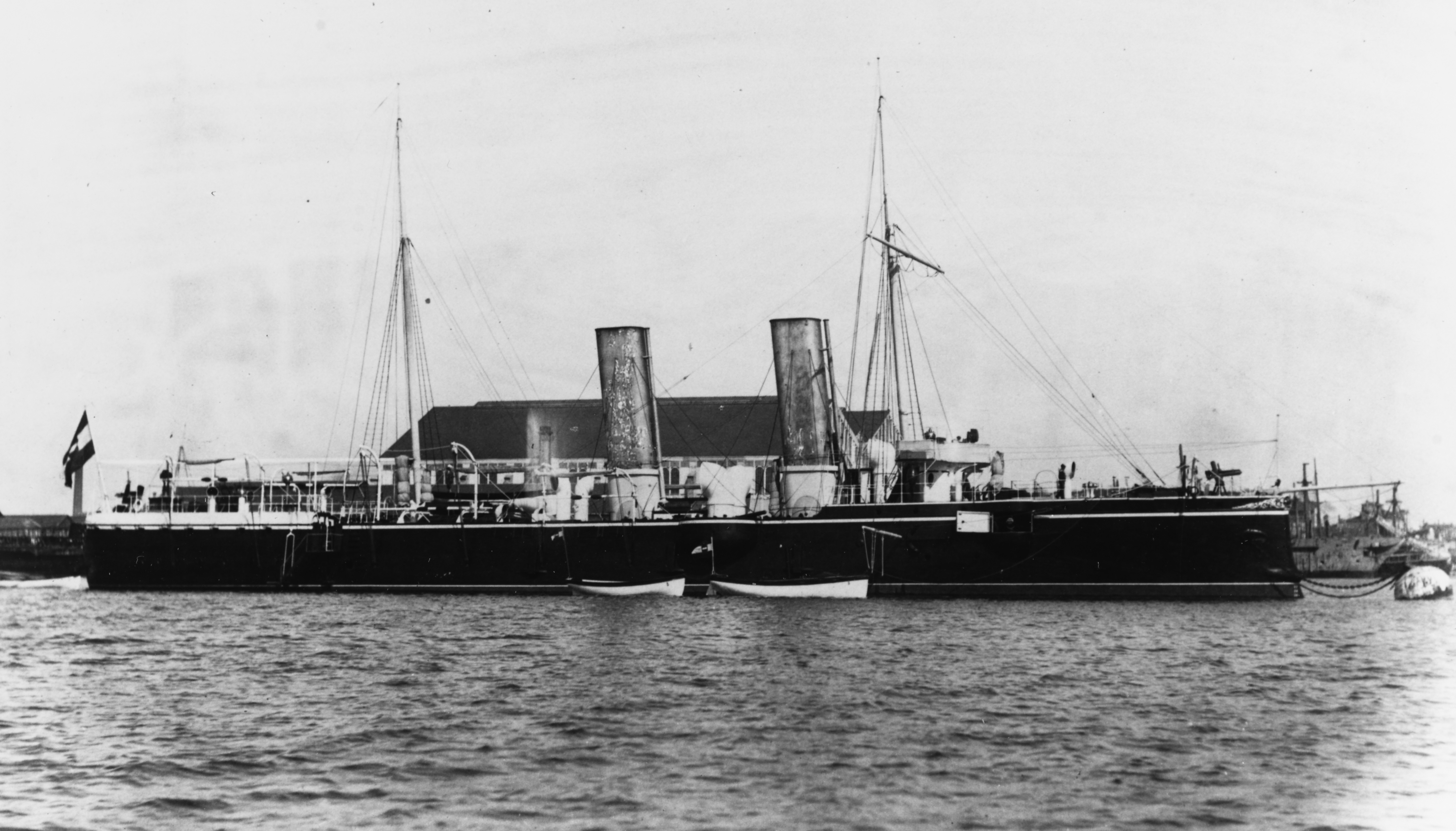
Leopard early in her career at Pola

Leopard was 73.19 meters (240 ft 1 in) long overall, with a beam of 10.39 m (34 ft 1 in) and a draft of 4.28 m (14 ft 1 in). She displaced 1,557 long tons (1,582 t) at normal loading. Her superstructure was fairly minimal, consisting primarily of a small conning tower forward. The ship had an inverted bow and a forecastle deck that extended for the first third of the vessel. She was fitted with a pair of pole masts. Her crew numbered 186 officers and men.

The ship's propulsion system consisted of a pair of two-cylinder vertical compound steam engines that drove a pair of screw propellers. Steam was provided by six cylindrical fire-tube boilers that were trunked into two funnels. On trials, Leopard reached a speed of 18.7 knots (34.6 km/h; 21.5 mph) from 6,380 indicated horsepower (4,760 kW). The ship had a cruising radius of 2,800 nautical miles (5,200 km; 3,200 mi) at a more economical speed of 10 knots (19 km/h; 12 mph).

The ship was armed with a main battery of two 12-centimeter (4.7 in) 35-caliber (cal.) guns manufactured by Krupp in single mounts, which were placed in sponsons amidships, one per side. These were supported by a secondary battery of four 47 mm (1.9 in) quick-firing guns and six 47 mm revolver cannon, which provided close-range defense against torpedo boats. The ship's primary offensive armament was her four 14 in (356 mm) torpedo tubes. The torpedo tubes were located singly, in the bow, stern, and at either beam. Leopard was protected with a thin 12 mm (0.47 in) armored deck.

== Service ==
Leopard underway

The keel for Leopard was laid down in January 1885 at the Armstrong shipyard in Elswick in Britain. Her completed hull was launched on 10 September that year, and fitting-out work was completed on 31 March 1886. On 1 April, the Austro-Hungarian crew took possession of the ship and left for home, arriving in Pola on 2 May. Upon arrival, she was taken into the shipyard to have her armament installed, including her torpedo tubes in 1887. She participated in the annual fleet maneuvers in 1888, along with the ironclads Don Juan d'Austria, Kaiser Max, Custoza, Tegetthoff, and the cruisers Panther and Meteor. That year, Leopard and Panther joined a squadron that included the ironclads Tegetthoff, Custoza, Kaiser Max, Don Juan d'Austria, and Prinz Eugen to represent Austria-Hungary in the opening ceremonies for the Barcelona Universal Exposition. This was the largest squadron of the Austro-Hungarian Navy that had operated outside the Adriatic. While on the way back home, Leopard, Custoza, Kaiser Max, and Prinz Eugen stopped in Malta.

On 9 June 1888, Leopard made a stop in Gravosa. While on training exercises off the island of Curzola on 25 June, Leopard ran aground, but was able to free herself under her own power two days later. In the subsequent investigation, the ship's captain was judged to be at fault and was sentenced to 30 days' house arrest. On 4 July, the ship was decommissioned in Pola for repairs for damage sustained in the accident. She spent the years 1889 and 1890 in reserve, before returning to service with the main squadron from 8 May 1891 to 28 June. Leopard was laid up in 1892, but served with the active squadron from 8 May 1893 to 1 August. Another lengthy reserve period followed between 1894 and 1896.

In February 1897, Leopard deployed to Crete to serve in the International Squadron, a multinational force made up of ships of the Austro-Hungarian Navy, French Navy, Imperial German Navy, Italian Royal Navy (Regia Marina), Imperial Russian Navy, and British Royal Navy that intervened in the 1897-1898 Greek uprising on Crete against rule by the Ottoman Empire. She arrived as part of an Austro-Hungarian contingent that also included the ironclad Kronprinzessin Erzherzogin Stephanie, the armored cruiser Kaiserin und Königin Maria Theresia, and the torpedo cruisers Tiger and Sebenico, three destroyers, and eight torpedo boats, the third-largest contingent in the International Squadron after those of the United Kingdom and the Kingdom of Italy. The International Squadron operated off Crete until December 1898, but Austria-Hungary, displeased with the decision to create an autonomous Cretan State under the suzerainty of the Ottoman Empire, withdrew its ships in March 1898.

From 1 October 1900 to 1 October 1901, Leopard embarked on a tour of the Pacific Ocean, which included a visit to Australia, Polynesia, and various ports in East Asia. Leopard carried a group of naval cadets on the training cruise, and she brought a memorial to the island of Guadalcanal, where men from the gunboat Albatross had died during their expedition in the Pacific Ocean. During this period, she was temporarily assigned to the East Asia squadron, under the command of then-Captain Anton Haus, who went on to command the Austro-Hungarian fleet during World War I. After returning to Austria-Hungary, Leopard served with the main squadron in 1902 and 1903, was laid up in 1904, and served with the fleet again in 1905. She made another deployment to East Asian waters in 1907–1909, departing Austro-Hungarian waters on 20 September 1907. She visited numerous Chinese, Russian, and Japanese ports, and cruised up the Yangtze river; she was relieved by her sister Panther on 13 April 1909, allowing her to return home.

Leopard was placed in reserve from 1910 to 1913; during this period, she was rearmed, losing most of her gun battery and being equipped with four 66 mm (2.6 in) 45-cal. guns and ten 47 mm QF guns. On 14 February 1914, she was reactivated for service with the torpedo training school, a role she filled until 15 May, when she was decommissioned again. Following the outbreak of World War I, she was reactivated for coastal defense, assigned to the II Coastal Defense Division. She was stationed as a harbor guard ship in Pola, where she remained for the duration of the war. Under the terms of the Treaty of Saint-Germain-en-Laye, Britain received Leopard as a war prize in 1920, but she was instead sold to ship breakers in Italy and scrapped.
