= SMS Panther =

SMS Panther may refer to:

- SMS Panther (1885), an Austro-Hungarian torpedo cruiser launched in 1885 and broken up in 1920
- SMS Panther (1901), a German gunboat launched in 1901 and scrapped in 1931
