= SMS Tiger (1887) =

Torpedo cruiser of the Austro-Hungarian Navy

- Tiger shortly after completion

Class overview
- Preceded by: Panther class
- Succeeded by: None

History

Austro-Hungarian Empire
- Name: SMS Tiger
- Builder: Stabilimento Tecnico Triestino, Trieste
- Laid down: 5 October 1886
- Launched: 26 June 1887
- Completed: March 1888
- Renamed: Lacroma, 1906
- Fate: Broken up in Italy, 1920

General characteristics
- Type: Torpedo cruiser
- Displacement: 1,657 to 1,680 long tons (1,684 to 1,707 t)
- Length: 76.02 m (249 ft 5 in)
- Beam: 10.55 m (34 ft 7 in)
- Draft: 4.3 m (14 ft 1 in)
- Installed power: 4 × fire-tube boilers; 5,700 ihp (4,300 kW)
- Propulsion: 2 × compound steam engines; 2 × screw propellers
- Speed: 18 knots (33 km/h; 21 mph)
- Complement: 188
- Armament: 4 × 12 cm (4.7 in) Krupp guns; 6 × 47 mm (1.9 in) guns; 4 × 47 mm revolver cannon; 4 × 35 cm (13.8 in) torpedo tubes

SMS Tiger was a torpedo cruiser built for the Austro-Hungarian Navy in the mid-1880s. An enlarged and improved version of the Panther class, she was part of a program to build up Austria-Hungary's fleet of torpedo craft in the 1880s. The Panther class, purchased from a British shipyard, was acquired in part to gain experience building cruisers of the type; this provided the basis for the design of Tiger. She was laid down at the Stabilimento Tecnico Triestino shipyard in October 1886, she was launched in June 1887, and was completed in March 1888. The ship was armed with a battery of four 12 cm (4.7 in) guns and three 35 cm (14 in) torpedo tubes, and was capable of speeds in excess of 19 knots (35 km/h; 22 mph).

Tiger's career was fairly uneventful; for the majority of her active duty career, she was activated only for the summer training maneuvers in June and July. She participated in a major cruise to Germany in 1890, which saw numerous visits to other countries along the way. In 1897, she took part in an international naval demonstration off the island of Crete to prevent enforce limits on the Greco-Turkish War. In 1906 she was converted to an admiralty yacht and renamed Lacroma. She saw no significant service during World War I, and was used as a barracks ship from 1916 to the end of the conflict. Following Austria-Hungary's defeat, she was ceded as a war prize to Italy and was broken up in 1920.

== Design ==
Leopard of the Panther class, which provided the basis for Tiger

The Austro-Hungarian Marinekommandant (Navy Commander), Vizeadmiral (Vice Admiral) Maximilian Daublebsky von Sterneck, outlined in a memorandum of 8 September 1884 the requirements for a torpedo cruiser. Such a vessel should have a reinforced bow for ramming as well as torpedoes for attacks on larger warships. The cruisers would also be small and fast enough to undertake patrol and reconnaissance duties. The first two ships of Sterneck's program, the Panther class, were built in Britain so the Austro-Hungarian Navy could gain experience building small cruisers. The program was overseen by the naval engineer Siegfried Popper, who was tasked with designing a third cruiser in July 1885, to be built domestically. The Panther class provided the basis for the third ship, Tiger.

A commission was convened on 16 September to discuss the parameters for the new cruiser; among the questions were whether the ship would replicate the Panther-class ships or it would be an entirely new design. Konteradmiral (Rear Admiral) Alexander Eberan von Eberhorst, who headed the commission in charge of the cruiser program, instructed Popper that the commission had decided that the new ship should have a speed of not less than 16 knots (30 km/h; 18 mph) and carry two 12 cm (4.7 in) guns like the Panthers, but the ship should be some 50 long tons (51 t) larger.

The Marinesektion (Naval Section of the War Ministry) requested tenders from Stabilimento Tecnico Triestino (STT) and the British shipyard Armstrong, which had built the Panther. class. The Armstrong proposal incorporated four 12 cm guns and was slightly longer than the Panther class, allowing for finer hull lines for less hydrodynamic resistance. STT's design was slightly smaller than Panther, but was otherwise similar to Armstrong's ship; both firms guaranteed a speed of 17 knots (31 km/h; 20 mph) normally and 18 knots (33 km/h; 21 mph) at forced draft. The navy determined that Armstrong's design would have reduced maneuverability compared to Panther, and the hull was too lightly built, so the STT proposal was chosen on 16 March 1886. STT received the contract on 25 May, for a price of 780,000 florins; the contract stipulated a minimum speed of 18 knots, along with a bonus for every one-tenth of a knot over 18.5 knots (34.3 km/h; 21.3 mph). Popper, who had been in Britain supervising the completion of Panther and Leopard, returned to oversee the construction of Tiger. Before work began, the builders decided to increase the length of the hull slightly to provide more space for the boiler room. Much of the steel used in the hull was domestically produced, but some material was purchased from British steelmakers.

=== Characteristics ===
Tiger was 74.16 meters (243 ft 4 in) long at the waterline and 76.02 m (249 ft 5 in) long overall. She had a beam of 10.6 m (34 ft 9 in) and a draft of 4.3 m (14 ft 1 in) on a displacement of 1,657 to 1,680 long tons (1,684 to 1,707 t). Her superstructure consisted of a small conning tower forward. The ship had a short forecastle deck that terminated just aft of her conning tower. She had a slightly inverted bow. Her crew numbered 13 officers and 175 men, though this later decreased to a total of 177 officers and men. She was fitted with two pole masts.

The ship's propulsion system consisted of a pair of two-cylinder compound steam engines, with steam provided by four double-ended, coal-fired fire-tube boilers. The boilers were vented through a pair of funnels located amidships. The engines drove two screw propellers. The engines were rated at 6,222 metric horsepower (4,576 kW) for a top speed of 19.2 knots (35.6 km/h; 22.1 mph), though her service speed was 18 knots (33 km/h; 21 mph) from 5,692 PS (4,186 kW). Storage capacity for coal amounted to 322 long tons (327 t). She had a cruising radius of 1,260 nautical miles (2,330 km; 1,450 mi) at a more economical speed of 17.5 knots (32.4 km/h; 20.1 mph).

Tiger was armed with a main battery of four 12-centimeter (4.7 in) 35-caliber (cal.) guns manufactured by Krupp in single mounts, which were sponsoned, two abreast of the funnels and the other two aft of the main mast. Close-range defense against torpedo boats was provided by a secondary battery of six 47 mm (1.9 in) quick-firing guns and four 47 mm revolver cannon. They were also armed with four 35 cm (13.8 in) torpedo tubes. The torpedo tubes were located singly, in the bow, stern, and at either beam. In 1906, when Tiger was converted into a yacht, she was rearmed with just the six 47 mm QF guns.

== Service history ==
=== Construction – 1896 ===
After conversion to an admiralty yacht

The keel for Tiger was laid down at the Stabilimento Tecnico Triestino shipyard in Trieste on 5 October 1886. She was launched on 28 June 1887. Completion of the ship had been delayed by manufacturing problems from the domestic steel supplier, since the initial material sent did not meet the strength requirements. STT rejected it and requested better quality steel; this forced STT to inform the Marinesektion on 20 September 1887 that it would not be able to meet its delivery date. After fitting-out work was completed, Tiger was ready for sea trials by February 1888. While performing speed tests, she reached a speed of 19.25 knots (35.65 km/h; 22.15 mph) with forced draft and 18.24 knots (33.78 km/h; 20.99 mph) with normal power, earning STT its bonus. The ship then had her guns and torpedo equipment installed. She was commissioned into the fleet in late March. Archduke Charles Stephen of Austria, then ranked a Fregattenkapitän (frigate captain) served as the ship's first commander; her first duty was as the flotilla leader of a flotilla of torpedo boats, during the fleet maneuvers from 12 June to 24 July.

The ship took part in the second half of the annual fleet maneuvers from 13 June to 16 July 1889 held off the coast of Dalmatia. The maneuvers tested new tactical developments, including an abandonment of the line ahead formation in favor of an en echelon formation in groups of four vessels. She participated in the summer maneuvers in 1890, before departing on a major cruise to northern European waters. The German emperor, Kaiser Wilhelm II, invited the Austro-Hungarian fleet to take part in the annual fleet training exercises in August. Tiger joined the ironclads Kronprinz Erzherzog Rudolf and Kronprinzessin Erzherzogin Stephanie and the protected cruiser Kaiser Franz Joseph I for the trip to Germany, under the command of Rear Admiral Johann von Hinke. While en route, the squadron made visits in Gibraltar and Britain; during the latter stop, the ships took part in the Cowes Regatta, where they were reviewed by Queen Victoria. The ships also stopped in Copenhagen, Denmark and Karlskrona, Sweden. The Austro-Hungarian squadron stayed in Germany from 29 August to 3 September, where they took part in a naval review. During the voyage back to Austria-Hungary, the squadron visited Cherbourg, France and Palermo, Italy. The voyage was considered to be a great success in the Austro-Hungarian Navy. After returning home, Tiger was detached from the squadron on 13 October and was decommissioned in Pola on 26 October.

The same pattern as in previous years took place in the following four years, with the exception of 1893, when Tiger was not activated for the exercises. During the 1892 maneuvers, Tiger led a flotilla of torpedo craft consisting of the torpedo vessels Trabant and Planet, the torpedo depot ship Pelikan, and twelve torpedo boats during the second phase of the exercises. Tiger spent the years 1895 and 1896 in reserve status, and during the second year she was thoroughly overhauled, to include her engines and boilers. Her original 47 mm guns were replaced with new 44-cal. versions.

=== 1897–1920 ===
In February 1897, Tiger deployed to Crete to serve in the International Squadron, a multinational force made up of ships of the Austro-Hungarian Navy, French Navy, Imperial German Navy, Italian Royal Navy (Regia Marina), Imperial Russian Navy, and British Royal Navy that intervened in the 1897-1898 Greek uprising on Crete against rule by the Ottoman Empire. She arrived as part of an Austro-Hungarian contingent that also included Kronprinzessin Erzherzogin Stephanie, the armored cruiser Kaiserin und Königin Maria Theresia, the torpedo cruisers Leopard and Sebenico, three destroyers, and eight torpedo boats, the third-largest contingent in the International Squadron after those of the United Kingdom and the Kingdom of Italy. While operating with the squadron, Tiger was anchored off Kissamos when a severe storm threatened to force her ashore. Her crew had to cut the anchor chain loose so she could take shelter off the island of Gramvousa; divers later recovered the anchor. The International Squadron operated off Crete until December 1898, but Austria-Hungary, displeased with the decision to create an autonomous Cretan State under the suzerainty of the Ottoman Empire, withdrew its ships in March 1898. Tiger arrived in Pola on 31 March 1898, where she was reduced to reserve.

Lacroma c. 1920; note her bridge has been removed

On 29 May 1900, Tiger was reactivated, and she was assigned as the flagship of the II Division the following day. She served in this role for three months during the summer training period, before returning to the reserve fleet. In 1901, the navy decided to add bilge keels to the ship to reduce her tendency to roll in heavy seas. In addition, a 5-metric-horsepower (4.9 hp) dynamo, a steam control system, and electric lights were also installed. She participated in the summer training exercises in 1902 and 1903, before returning to reserve status on 15 September 1903. In late 1903, the navy began to consider what would be done with Tiger, now 15 years old, for the remainder of her career. The navy considered four options in a meeting on 19 February 1904: to keep the ship armed with her original gun battery, to disarm her, to replace them with new 40-cal. versions, or replace them with 7 cm 45-cal. guns. Ultimately, the Marinesektion rejected all four proposals, since the ship's boilers were in poor condition by that point. Instead, they decided to convert the ship into an admiralty yacht, since she had little combat value by that time anyway. Additionally, the current yacht, Pelikan, was to be converted into a depot ship for the torpedo training school. The plan was prepared in June, and the work was to be done at the Pola Naval Arsenal. The conversion work was done in 1905–1906 and she was renamed Lacroma on 29 January 1906. Her armament reduced to six 47 mm QF guns and the sponsons for her main battery were removed.

After the work was completed, Lacroma underwent sea trials beginning on 9 July 1906. She was thereafter assigned to her role as the yacht for the Marinekommandant, at that time Admiral Rudolf Montecuccoli. The ship saw no significant service during World War I. In 1915, Lacroma was completely disarmed and thereafter used as a barracks ship for German U-boat crews in Pola starting in 1916. After Austria-Hungary's defeat in November 1918, was handed over to the new Royal Yugoslav Navy in 1918. On 5 November, the Italian occupation forces demanded that the entire Yugoslav fleet be handed over, but Rear Admiral Metodije Koch protested the demand to the Allied Naval Council. The council rejected his request to retain control of the fleet and allowed him to retain Lacroma only, and only in a disarmed state. This was only a temporary situation, however, as the fate of the former Austro-Hungarian fleet was determined at the Paris Peace Conference. In the postwar division of war prizes, the ship was awarded to Italy, where she was broken up in 1920.
