= Panther-class cruiser =

Torpedo cruiser class of the Austro-Hungarian Navy

- Panther in port, date unknown

Class overview
- Builders: Armstrong
- Operators: Austria–Hungary
- Preceded by: SMS Lussin
- Succeeded by: SMS Tiger
- Built: 1884–1886
- In commission: 1885–1920
- Completed: 2
- Scrapped: 2

General characteristics
- Type: Torpedo cruiser
- Displacement: Normal: 1,582 t (1,557 long tons; 1,744 short tons); Full load: 1,730 t (1,700 long tons; 1,910 short tons)
- Length: 73.19 m (240 ft 1 in)
- Beam: 10.39 m (34 ft 1 in)
- Draft: 4.28 m (14 ft 1 in)
- Installed power: 6 × fire-tube boilers; 5,940 to 6,380 indicated horsepower (4,430 to 4,760 kW)
- Propulsion: 2 × compound steam engines; 2 × screw propellers
- Speed: 18.4 to 18.7 knots (34.1 to 34.6 km/h; 21.2 to 21.5 mph)
- Range: 2,800 nmi (5,200 km; 3,200 mi) at 10 knots (19 km/h; 12 mph)
- Crew: 186
- Armament: 2 × 12 cm (4.7 in) guns; 4 × 47 mm (1.9 in) quick-firing guns; 6 × 47 mm (1.9 in) revolver cannon; 4 × 14 in (356 mm) torpedo tubes
- Armor: Deck: 12 mm (0.47 in)

The Panther class was a group of two torpedo cruisers, Panther and Leopard, built for the Austro-Hungarian Navy in the 1880s. The ships' primary armament was their four torpedo tubes, though they also carried a battery of medium and light-caliber guns. The ships were ordered in an effort to strengthen the defensive capabilities of the Austro-Hungarian Navy, during a period where funding for more expensive ironclad warships could not be secured from parliament. Since Austro-Hungarian naval designers did not have sufficient experience designing vessels of the type, the navy ordered the ships from the British Armstrong shipyard; work took from late 1884 to early 1886. After arriving in Austria-Hungary in 1886, the two ships served in a variety of roles. These included active duty with the main fleet in home waters, overseas training cruises, and showing the flag abroad. During World War I, the cruisers were mobilized for coastal defense duties, but saw no major action, apart from Panther shelling Montenegrin forces in 1916. After the war, both vessels were surrendered to Britain as war prizes and were broken up for scrap in 1920.

== Design ==
The Austro-Hungarian Marinekommandant (Navy Commander), Vizeadmiral (Vice Admiral) Maximilian Daublebsky von Sterneck, argued in a memorandum of 8 September 1884 addressed to Kaiser Franz Joseph I the fleet was too weak and must be expanded. The core of the fleet, ten ironclad warships were weak and out of date by international standards, the torpedo vessels were too few in number and too slow to be of use, and the wooden frigates and corvettes were useless as warships. He acknowledged that the government had failed to meet the fleet plan that had been outlined by VAdm Wilhelm von Tegetthoff in the early 1870s, owing to the chronically short naval budgets approved by the Imperial Council of Austria and the Diet of Hungary. Since new, more powerful, and thus more expensive ironclads could not be built, Sterneck made the argument that cheaper defensive weapons should be acquired; these included naval mines and more effective torpedo-armed ships. In the memorandum, he outlined requirements for a so-called "torpedo ram cruiser". Such a vessel should have a reinforced bow for ramming as well as torpedoes for attacks on larger warships. The cruisers would also be small and fast enough to undertake patrol and reconnaissance duties.

Leopard underway

Sterneck suggested a ship of about 1,500 metric tons (1,500 long tons; 1,700 short tons), with a speed of 18 to 19 knots (33 to 35 km/h; 21 to 22 mph); he also predicted that the type would lead to the development of larger vessels around 3,500 t (3,400 long tons; 3,900 short tons), armed with large-caliber guns and protected only with deck armor. These latter ships would be capable of engaging ironclads directly, and would be much cheaper than traditional ironclads. Sterneck called for three of the 1,500-ton cruisers to be built, along with several other recommendations to strengthen the fleet. On 18 September, Franz Joseph replied to Sterneck, authorizing him to proceed with his plans. Since the fleet had no vessels of the type, and thus no experience designing cruisers to fit his requirements, offers were extended to five British shipyards, with the only design requirements being a speed of at least 17 knots (31 km/h; 20 mph), an armament of 12 cm (4.7 in) guns, on the smallest possible displacement. The Austro-Hungarian Navy established a commission to examine the designs submitted by the British firms; Armstrong received the contract in part because they could build the ships more cheaply. The commission requested the ventilation for the boilers be improved, and requested that the armament consist of four deck-mounted torpedo tubes, two 12 cm guns, and ten 47 mm (1.9 in) Hotchkiss revolver cannon.

Naval architect Siegfried Popper was sent to Britain to supervise the construction of the ships. While the vessels were under construction, Popper discovered that the designers had made a serious error distributing the weight of the ships, such that the difference between the forward and aft draft was 1.5 m (4 ft 11 in). To rectify the problem, Armstrong made a series of proposals, from simply adding 30 t (30 long tons; 33 short tons) of ballast to the bow, extending the forecastle deck, or replacing the 12 cm guns with heavier 15 cm (5.9 in) guns. All of these were rejected. Instead, a series of smaller changes were made to correct the trim, which included adding 7 t (6.9 long tons; 7.7 short tons) of iron ballast, increasing coal storage, increasing the thickness of the conning tower walls, lengthening the forecastle slightly, and shifting the storage for the pinnace and cutter forward.

By acquiring foreign built ships, the Austro-Hungarian Navy would also gain experience building modern small cruisers. In fact, Panther and Leopard provided the basis for the follow-on design, SMS Tiger, which was a slightly enlarged version of the earlier ships. They were originally classified as "torpedo ships" (Torpedoschiff), equivalent of a torpedo cruiser in other navies. In 1903 they were reclassified as 3rd class cruisers, then in 1909 as small cruisers (Kleine Kreuzer).

=== Characteristics ===
Panther, shortly after arriving from Britain; note she carries no armament and is riding high in the water

The Panther-class cruisers were 69 meters (226 ft 5 in) long between perpendiculars, 71.38 m (234 ft 2 in) long at the waterline, and 73.19 m (240 ft 1 in) long overall. They had a beam of 10.39 m (34 ft 1 in) and a draft of 4.28 m (14 ft 1 in) normally and 4.5 m (15 ft) when fully loaded. They displaced 1,582 t (1,557 long tons; 1,744 short tons) normally and up to 1,730 t (1,700 long tons; 1,910 short tons) at full load. The ships' superstructure was fairly minimal, consisting primarily of a small conning tower forward. They had an inverted bow and a forecastle deck that extended for the first third of the vessels. They were fitted with a pair of pole masts. Their crew numbered 13 officers and 165 men, though this later increased to 198.

The ships' propulsion system consisted of a pair of two-cylinder vertical compound steam engines. Steam was provided by six cylindrical fire-tube boilers that were trunked into two funnels. The engines were rated at 6,000 indicated horsepower (4,500 kW) for a top speed of 18 knots (33 km/h; 21 mph). On trials, Panther reached a speed of 18.4 knots (34.1 km/h; 21.2 mph) from 5,940 ihp (4,430 kW), slightly slower than her sister ship Leopard, which made 18.7 knots (34.6 km/h; 21.5 mph) from 6,380 ihp (4,760 kW). These speeds were achieved using forced draft; running the machinery normally resulted in a speed of 17.6 knots (32.6 km/h; 20.3 mph). During the speed trials, Armstrong experimented with using smaller screws with lower pitch in an attempt to exceed 19 knots (35 km/h; 22 mph), but the tests proved unsuccessful. The ships had a cruising radius of 2,800 nautical miles (5,200 km; 3,200 mi) at a more economical speed of 10 knots (19 km/h; 12 mph). Unlike earlier cruising ships of the Austro-Hungarian Navy, Panther and Lussin did not carry a sailing rig to supplement their steam engines.

Panther and Leopard were armed with a main battery of two 12-centimeter (4.7 in) 35-caliber (cal.) guns manufactured by Krupp in single mounts, which were sponsoned abreast of the funnels. These were supported by a secondary battery of four 47 mm quick-firing guns and six 47 mm Hotchkiss revolver cannon, which provided close-range defense against torpedo boats. They were also armed with four 14 in (356 mm) torpedo tubes. The torpedo tubes were located singly, in the bow, stern, and at either beam. In June 1909, Panther was rearmed with four 66 mm (2.6 in) 45-cal. guns and ten 47 mm QF guns, along with her original torpedo tubes. Leopard was similarly reequipped the following year. The Panther-class ships were protected with a thin 12 mm (0.47 in) armored deck. The hatches above the engine room were 50 mm (2 in) thick.

== Ships ==
Ship	Builder	Laid down	Launched	Completed
SMS Panther	Armstrong	29 October 1884	13 June 1885	31 December 1885
SMS Leopard	Armstrong	January 1885	10 September 1885	31 March 1886

== Service history ==
Leopard, date unknown

After their crews arrived to take them back to Austria-Hungary in early 1886, both vessels were taken into the navy's shipyard in Pola, where their armament was installed over the course of 1887, to include their torpedo tubes. Both ships took part in the Barcelona Universal Exposition, which saw a squadron of ironclads and cruisers sent to represent Austria-Hungary at the opening ceremonies. Coincidentally, both ships ran aground during training operations in late June 1888. The two cruisers spent much of the early 1890s laid up, with Panther being reactivated in 1896 for a major training cruise in the Pacific Ocean from May 1896 to February 1898, and Leopard returning to service in 1897 to participate in an international naval demonstration off the island of Crete during the Greco-Turkish War. Leopard went on a training cruise in the Pacific in 1900–1901 for naval cadets, while Panther spent those years in reserve. The latter went on a cruise to Morocco in 1902, and to eastern Africa in 1905 to arrange a trade treaty with Ethiopia before embarking on another cruise in the Pacific. In the meantime, Leopard served with the main Austro-Hungarian fleet in home waters in the mid-1900s.

Leopard went on another tour of the Pacific in 1907–1909, and she was relieved in East Asian waters by Panther in April 1909, the latter remaining there until November 1910. Leopard was laid up from 1910 to 1913, during which time Panther served as a station ship in Trieste. At the outbreak of World War I in July 1914, both ships were assigned to the Coastal Defense Special Group. Panther shelled Montenegrin forces on Mount Lovcen overlooking the naval base in Cattaro Bay in January 1916, supporting an offensive by the Austro-Hungarian army to take the heights; the action ultimately forced Montenegro out of the war. Leopard was stationed in Pola for the duration of the war. After Austria-Hungary's defeat in November 1918, both ships were ceded as war prizes to the victorious Allies, and Britain received both vessels under the terms of the Treaty of Saint-Germain-en-Laye. Both were sold to Italian ship breakers in 1920.
