= SMS Panther (1885) =

Torpedo cruiser of the Austro-Hungarian Navy

- Panther in port

History

Austro-Hungarian Empire
- Name: Panther
- Builder: Armstrong, Elswick
- Laid down: 29 October 1884
- Launched: 13 June 1885
- Completed: 31 December 1885
- Fate: Broken up, 1920

General characteristics
- Class & type: Panther-class cruiser
- Displacement: 1,557 long tons (1,582 t)
- Length: 73.19 m (240 ft 1 in)
- Beam: 10.39 m (34 ft 1 in)
- Draft: 4.28 m (14 ft 1 in)
- Installed power: 6 × fire-tube boilers; 5,940 indicated horsepower (4,430 kW)
- Propulsion: 2 × compound steam engines; 2 × screw propellers
- Speed: 18.4 knots (34.1 km/h; 21.2 mph)
- Range: 2,800 nmi (5,200 km; 3,200 mi) at 10 knots (19 km/h; 12 mph)
- Crew: 186
- Armament: 2 × 12 cm (4.7 in) guns; 4 × 47 mm (1.9 in) quick-firing guns; 6 × 47 mm (1.9 in) revolver cannon; 4 × 14 in (356 mm) torpedo tubes
- Armor: Deck: 12 mm (0.47 in)

SMS Panther was a torpedo cruiser (Torpedoschiff) of the Austro-Hungarian Navy. She and her sister ship, Leopard were part of a program to build up Austria-Hungary's fleet of torpedo craft in the 1880s. She was the lead ship of her class, and was built in Britain by Armstrong, from her keel laying in October 1884 to her completion in December 1885. She was armed with a battery of two 12 cm (4.7 in) guns and ten 47 mm (1.9 in) guns, along with four 356 mm (14 in) torpedo tubes.

After arriving in Austria-Hungary, Panther initially served with the main fleet. During this period, she visited Spain for the 1888 Barcelona Universal Exposition. Starting in the mid-1890s, the ship spent much of her time abroad. From 1896 to 1898, she was stationed in China, and she sent a shore party to help United States Marines protect US civilians during a riot. She went on a cruise in the Mediterranean in 1902, and in 1905, she visited East Africa. Panther was modernized in 1909–1910 and received a new gun armament. At the outbreak of World War I in July 1914, the ship was assigned to the Coastal Defense Special Group; these ships provided artillery support to an Austro-Hungarian Army attack in January 1916 that knocked Montenegro out of the war. The next year, Panther was withdrawn from frontline service and employed as a training ship. Awarded to Britain in the postwar division of war prizes, Panther was broken up for scrap in Italy in 1920.

== Design ==
In the early 1880s, Vizeadmiral (Vice Admiral) Maximilian Daublebsky von Sterneck pressed for new naval construction to strengthen the chronically neglected Austro-Hungarian Navy, but realizing that new ironclad battleships could not be built given the parliaments' unwillingness to fund such expensive projects, he requested a pair of small protected cruisers. These ships would be used defensively against the larger and more expensive ironclads possessed by Austria-Hungary's rivals. Because the small Austro-Hungarian shipbuilding industry lacked experience building modern cruising vessels, the contracts for the new ships were given to Armstrong in the United Kingdom, though the experience the navy gained was used to build the follow-on cruiser Tiger domestically.

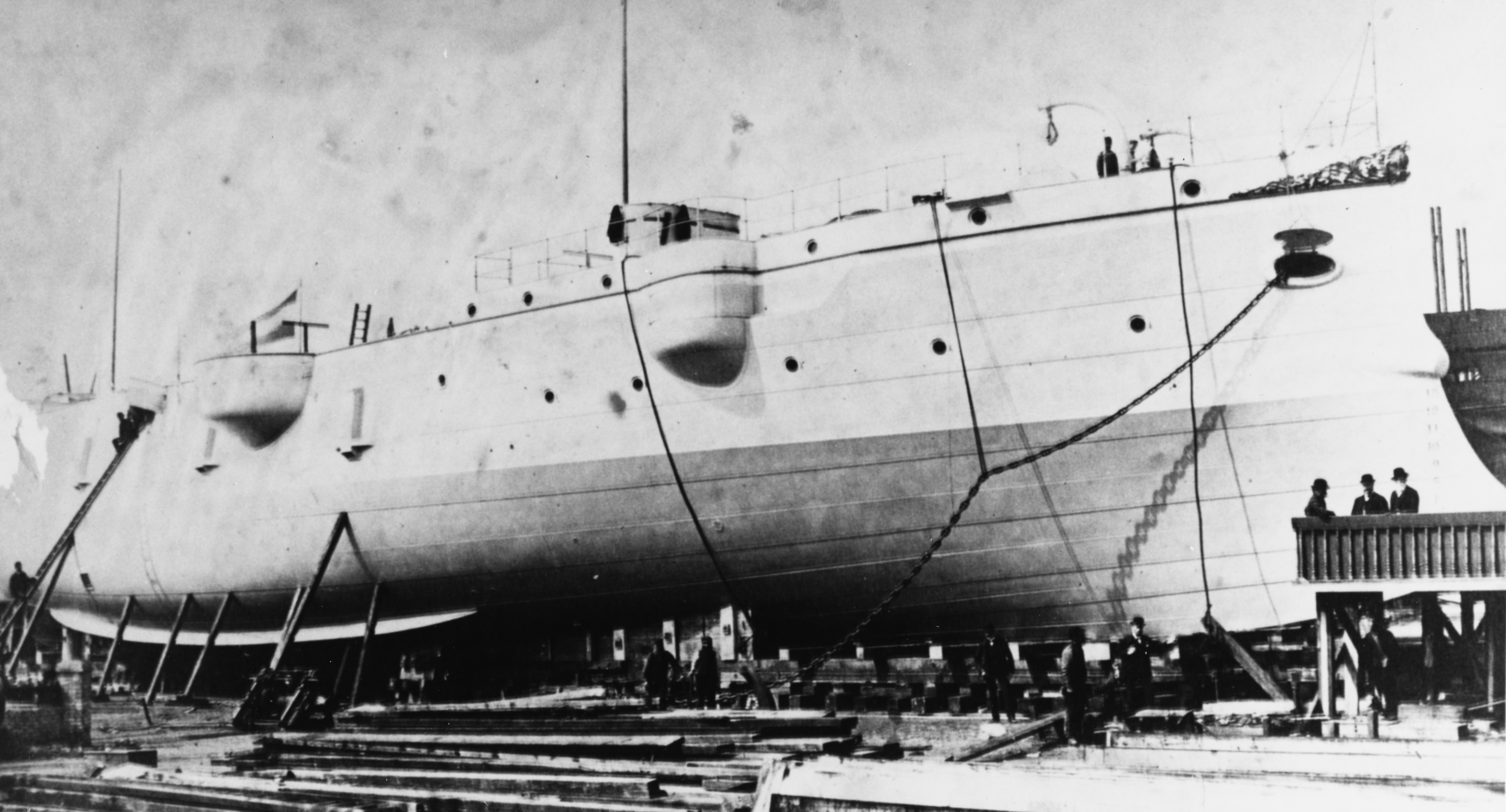
Panther on the stocks, shortly before launching

Panther was 73.19 meters (240 ft 1 in) long overall, with a beam of 10.39 m (34 ft 1 in) and a draft of 4.28 m (14 ft 1 in). She displaced 1,557 long tons (1,582 t) at normal loading. Her superstructure was fairly minimal, consisting primarily of a small conning tower forward. The ship had an inverted bow and a forecastle deck that extended for the first third of the vessel. She was fitted with a pair of pole masts. Her crew numbered 186 officers and men.

The ship's propulsion system consisted of a pair of two-cylinder vertical compound steam engines that drove a pair of screw propellers. Steam was provided by six cylindrical fire-tube boilers that were trunked into two funnels. On trials, Panther reached a speed of 18.4 knots (34.1 km/h; 21.2 mph) from 5,940 indicated horsepower (4,430 kW), slightly slower than her sister ship Leopard. The ship had a cruising radius of 2,800 nautical miles (5,200 km; 3,200 mi) at a more economical speed of 10 knots (19 km/h; 12 mph).

The ship was armed with a main battery of two 12-centimeter (4.7 in) 35-caliber (cal.) guns manufactured by Krupp in single mounts, which were placed in sponsons amidships, one per side. These were supported by a secondary battery of four 47 mm (1.9 in) quick-firing guns and six 47 mm revolver cannon, which provided close-range defense against torpedo boats. The ship's primary offensive armament was her four 356 mm (14 in) torpedo tubes. The torpedo tubes were located singly, in the bow, stern, and at either beam. Panther was protected with a thin 12 mm (0.47 in) armored deck.

== Service ==
Panther, shortly after arriving from Britain; note she carries no armament and is riding high in the water

Panther was built in Britain by the Armstrong shipyard in Elswick. Her keel was laid down on 29 October 1884, and her completed hull was launched on 13 June 1885. She was completed on 31 December 1885. On 15 January 1886, the ship's first commander arrived to take the ship to Pola, which she reached on 12 February. Upon arrival, she was taken into the shipyard to have her armament installed, including her torpedo tubes in 1887. After this work was completed in 1887, Panther entered service with the fleet, where she served as a flotilla leader for torpedo boats. This included a period of service with the main fleet from 6 May to 5 June in 1886.

She participated in the annual fleet maneuvers in 1888, along with the ironclads Don Juan d'Austria, Kaiser Max, Custoza, Tegetthoff, and the cruisers Leopard and Meteor. That year, Panther and Leopard joined a squadron that included the ironclads Tegetthoff, Custoza, Kaiser Max, Don Juan d'Austria, and Prinz Eugen to represent Austria-Hungary in the opening ceremonies for the Barcelona Universal Exposition from 25 April to 2 May. This was the largest squadron of the Austro-Hungarian Navy that had operated outside the Adriatic. On 21 June, she ran aground and the ship's captain, Rudolf Montecuccoli, later the chief of the Marinesektion, was reprimanded and forced to pay for the repair costs.

In early 1896, Panther was adapted for extended overseas cruises. From 1 May 1896 to 28 February 1898, Panther was deployed to the East Asian station. During this period, she assisted American Marines from the gunboat USS Monocacy in Shanghai. The Austro-Hungarian landing party Panther sent ashore helped the Marines protect American civilians during riots in the area. Panther returned home in 1898 after having been relieved by the old corvettes Saida and Frundsberg. After returning to Austria-Hungary, she was decommissioned in 1899. She returned to active duty for service with the summer training squadron in 1900 and 1902. In 1902, Panther cruised the western Mediterranean Sea and briefly into the Atlantic Ocean, making a call in Rabat, Morocco. One of the purposes of the trip was to deliver a gift to Abdelaziz, the Sultan of Morocco.

Panther during a visit to Australia while stationed in the Pacific

The ship went to East Africa in 1905, departing Austria-Hungary on 15 January, under the command of Captain Ludwig von Höhnel. The ship stopped in French-controlled Djibouti, where Höhnel and a group left the ship to travel overland to Ethiopia, where they concluded a trading treaty for Austria-Hungary. Höhnel's mission lasted from 4 February to 10 April. From there, Panther continued on in the Pacific Ocean, making visits in Australia, New Zealand, Japan, and China, before ultimately returning to Austria-Hungary on 22 December 1906. In June 1909, the ship was drydocked for modernization that included a complete overhaul of her gun battery; after emerging from the shipyard, she carried four 66 mm (2.6 in) 45-cal. guns and ten 47 mm QF guns, along with her original torpedo tubes. Electric lighting and equipment to bake bread were also installed. From 16 August 1909 to 15 November 1910, Panther made another voyage to East Asia; during the trip, she cruised in Japan's inland sea and made several stops along the Chinese coast. From her return to Austria-Hungary to 1913, she served as a station ship in Trieste.

At the outbreak of World War I in July 1914, Panther was assigned to the Coastal Defense Special Group, along with the three Monarch-class coastal defense ships and the cruiser Kaiser Franz Joseph I. The ships were commanded by Rear Admiral Richard von Barry. From 8 to 10 January 1916, Panther and the ships of the Coastal Defense Special Group provided artillery support to the troops of the XIX Corps as they mounted a major attack to destroy Montenegrin forces from Mount Lovcen. The success of the offensive forced Montenegro out of the war shortly thereafter. Later that year, she had one of her 66 mm guns replaced with a 66 mm gun in an anti-aircraft mounting. From 15 February 1917, she was employed as a training ship for the Submarine Commander's School in Cattaro Bay. On 6 May, she was taken to Pola for an overhaul, and returned to training duties on 29 May. Under the terms of the Treaty of Saint-Germain-en-Laye, Britain received Panther as a war prize in 1920, but she was instead sold to ship breakers in Italy and scrapped in 1920.
