= Henry S. Trout =

American politician

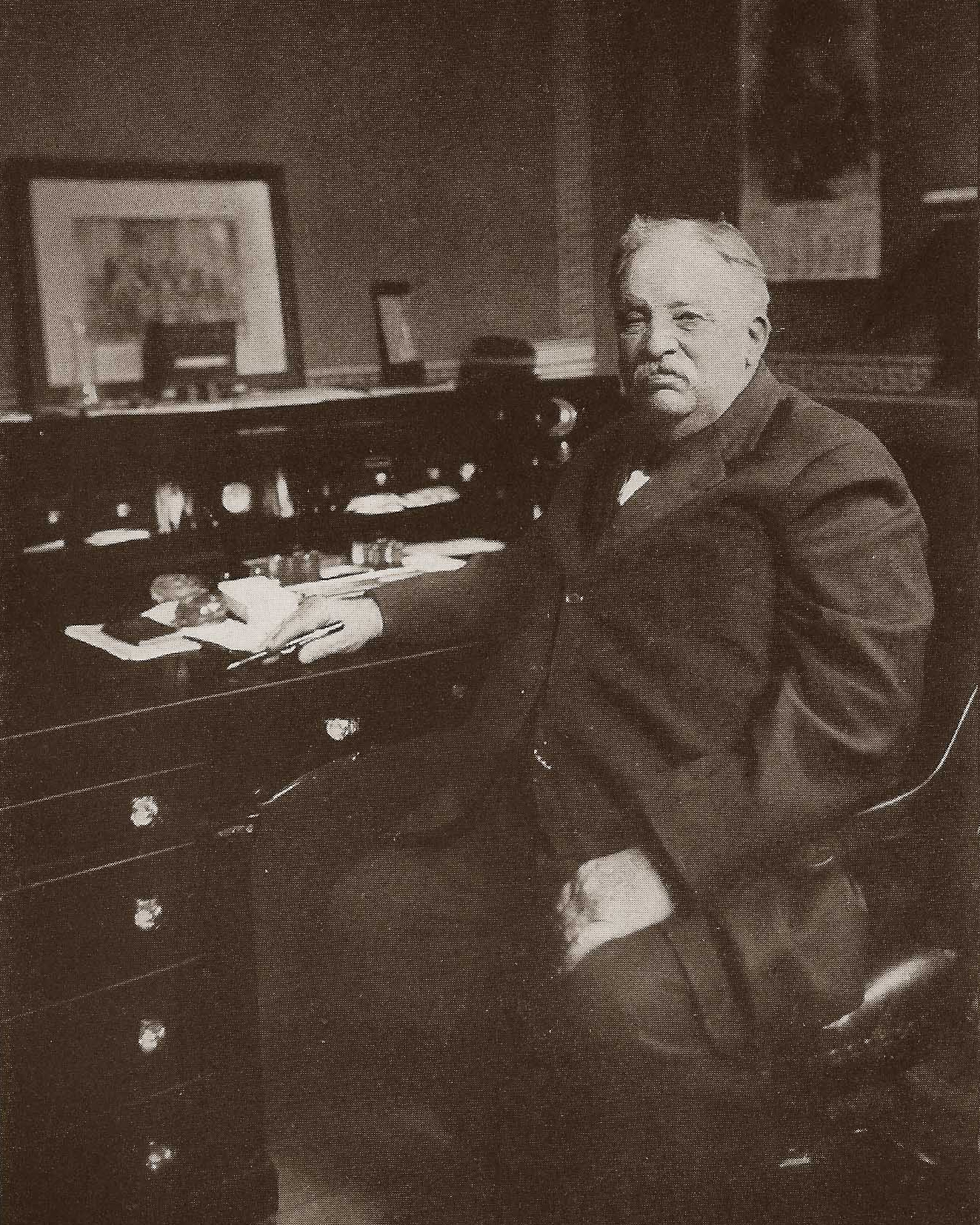

11th Mayor of Roanoke, Virginia
- In office July 1, 1892 – June 30, 1894
- Preceded by: William G. Evans
- Succeeded by: Sturgis E. Jones

Member of the Virginia Senate from the 4th district
- In office December 5, 1883 – December 8, 1887
- Preceded by: James E. Eskridge
- Succeeded by: D. F. Houston

Member of the Virginia House of Delegates from Roanoke County
- In office December 5, 1877 – December 3, 1879
- Preceded by: William Watts
- Succeeded by: Michael P. Spessard

Personal details
- Born: Henry Shaver Trout; October 15, 1841 Roanoke County, Virginia, US
- Died: April 16, 1918 (aged 76) Roanoke, Virginia, US
- Party: Democratic
- Spouse: Annie Elmira Thomas
- Education: Roanoke College

Military service
- Allegiance: Confederate States
- Branch/service: Confederate States Army
- Years of service: 1861–1865
- Rank: Second lieutenant
- Unit: 28th Virginia Infantry
- Battles/wars: American Civil War

Henry Shaver Trout (October 15, 1841 – April 16, 1918) was a Virginia lawmaker who served as both state delegate and senator, and later as mayor of Roanoke, Virginia.

== Early life ==
Henry Shaver Trout was the son of John Trout (1813–1882), the first mayor of Roanoke, and Eliza Jane Shaver (1820–1853). His father's farm lands became the basis for Big Lick and eventually the City of Roanoke. Henry Trout married Annie Elmira Thomas of Montgomery County, Virginia, on 16 May 1866. Three children were born to this union.

Shortly after his birth, his father acquired "The Trout House", an extensive farm on Franklin road in Roanoke. "The Trout House: A popular tavern of Southwest Virginia in Ante-Bellum days. Built in 1797 by William Stover and Acquired by John Trout in 1845." Another part of an article says the house was purchased in 1838, before the birth of Henry Trout. He attended Roanoke College for two years in preparatory school, and another two years in higher education there.

== Civil War service ==
Henry Trout served as a lieutenant in Company A, 28th Virginia Infantry Regiment, of George Pickett's Division. He participated in Pickett's Charge at the Battle of Gettysburg, and was twice wounded. He mas made a captive near the end of the war, and imprisoned in Johnson's Island Prisoner of War camp.

He enlisted as a private in Company I of the 28th Virginia Infantry on May 13, 1861, at age 23, and was promoted to Sergeant on August 1, 1862, and later promoted to Second lieutenant during November 1862. Prisoner of war captured at Sayler's Creek Battlefield on April 6, 1865, and released on June 20, 1865, from Johnson's Island, Ohio. Six feet tall, light hair, fair complexion, blue eyes.

== Political and professional life ==
Henry Trout was elected to the Virginia House of Delegates for the term 1877–1881. He was then elected to the Virginia Senate for the session 1882–1886. He was elected mayor of Roanoke in 1892. Trout was also the first president of the First National Bank (Roanoke, Virginia), which he held the office for over 30 years.

== Race Riot of 1893 ==
Henry Trout was the mayor of Roanoke when the infamous city riot of 1893 took place. A black man had been accused of assaulting a white woman, and later a white mob assaulted the militia and stormed the city jail. The mob, about 5,000 strong, threw rocks at the troops, who returned fire, killing eight men. However, the mob entered the jail and lynched the accused man, Thomas Smith. Mayor Trout tried to stop and reason with the mob, but was shot in the foot by the angry mob, and then the mayor was hurried away from the mob and sent out of town by his friends for his own protection. Later, the mob took the hanged man's body to the unprotected home of Mayor Trout, and threatened to lay him out on the mayor's dining room table. Afterwards, they planned to bury his body in Trout's front yard.

== Death and Burial ==
He went to work as usual at the First National Bank (Roanoke, Virginia), but went home early when he began to feel ill, and died on April 16, 1918, at his home on Campbell Avenue. He was considered "Roanoke's Real Pioneer" and the city's oldest native born resident. Many shops in Roanoke were closed for his funeral, and the students of Roanoke College attended his funeral. The service was at his home and was open to the people of Roanoke.

Henry Shaver Trout's grave is listed as Site #5 on the Fair View Cemetery walking tour, located on Confederate Drive just east of the intersection with Magnolia Avenue in Roanoke.
