= 28th Virginia battle flag =

Flag of the 28th Virginia Infantry Regiment

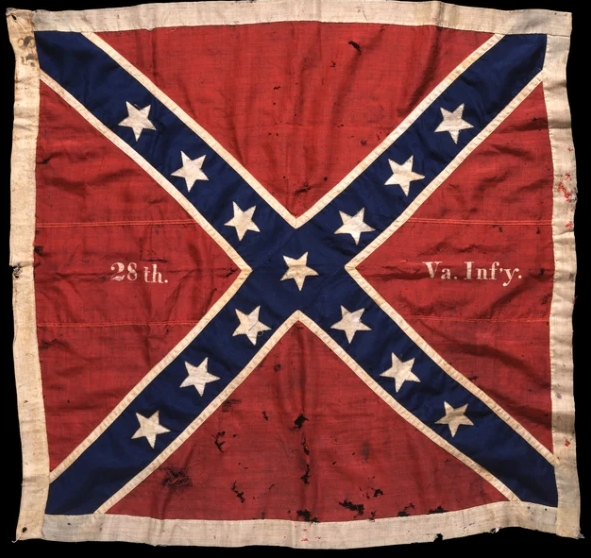
- Use: War flag
- Proportion: 1:1
- Adopted: November 28, 1861
- Design: Red flag featuring a white-bordered blue diagonal cross, charged with 13 white five-pointed stars and framed by a white outer edge.

The Regimental Color of the 28th Virginia Infantry is a Confederate battle flag that belonged to the 28th Virginia Infantry Regiment. Captured by the 1st Minnesota Infantry Regiment at the Battle of Gettysburg, the flag was brought to Minnesota and exhibited at the state's capitol for several years before passing into the permanent collection of the Minnesota Historical Society after 1896 where it has remained since. Although various groups in Virginia have requested that the flag be returned, beginning as early as 1960, Minnesota has repeatedly declined to return it, with Governor Jesse Ventura (serving 1999–2003) asking "Why? I mean, we won."

The battle flag was captured at the Battle of Gettysburg by Private Marshall Sherman of the 1st Minnesota Infantry Regiment, and remained in Sherman's possession in Minnesota after being inventoried by the United States War Department in 1867. A 1905 congressional resolution that flags from the American Civil War should be returned to their places of origin did not lead to the return of the flag to Virginia, nor did requests by Virginia or groups therein for its return in 1961, 1998, 2000, and 2003; a request by the governor of Virginia to borrow the flag in 2013 was also declined.

The flag is stored in a drawer at the Minnesota Historical Society, with its exact location undisclosed for security reasons. There are several holes in the flag, and the middle eyelet is torn; however, it is mostly intact with less than one percent of its fabric missing.

== Background ==
During the American Civil War, flags played important strategic and emotional roles in battles. They were used to guide soldiers and mark advances. Enemy forces would concentrate fire on standard-bearers, and if they were hit, soldiers near them would pick up the flags. As a result, flag designs were created to be recognizable and effective on the battlefield. One design developed on the Confederate side was known as the "southern cross", consisting of a red flag with a diagonal blue St. Andrew's cross (a symbol associated with the Scottish/Celtic culture, which had a strong tradition in the region) and white stars. This was carried by the Army of Northern Virginia, with nine different variations; this design was used for the 28th Virginia battle flag.

== Creation ==
The 28th Virginia battle flag is made from wool bunting that originated in the British Isles. It was likely sewn by a Southern woman at her home using a "flag kit" produced by the quartermaster of the Army of Northern Virginia; this work may have been motivated by profit or patriotism. The sewn-on white stars and edging may have been made from cotton fabric, which was turned a brownish color by the acidic conditions on Civil War battlefields that resulted from the use of black powder.

=== Appearance and issue ===
The 28th Virginia battle flag, as an instance of the typical Army of Northern Virginia design, is a square red flag bearing a blue saltire with white stars. The flag measures 44.5 inches (1,130 mm) in height and 48 inches (1,200 mm) in width. Records suggest that the battle flag was issued to George Pickett's division of the Army of Northern Virginia within a few weeks prior to the Battle of Gettysburg, when it would be captured. The battle would be its first use in combat.

== Capture ==
On the morning of July 3, 1863, Confederate General Robert E. Lee ordered an attack on the Union Army during the Battle of Gettysburg. The 28th Virginia Infantry Regiment was part of a brigade led by Brigadier General Richard Garnett, positioned at the point of a lopsided V-shape formed by the marching Confederate troops. The Union soldiers, located ahead of and above the Confederate troops, opened fire, but the Confederates broke through up Cemetery Ridge in places, reaching the area that would become known as the high-water mark of the Confederacy. Confederate reinforcements did not arrive, while Union troops entered the breaches.

The Union's 1st Minnesota Infantry Regiment was ordered to attack the flank of the Confederate troops, and did so while protecting their own flag after the last remaining member of their color guard was shot through the hand. More than 70% of the regiment's members were killed, wounded, or captured in the course of the battle.

During this attack by the 1st Minnesota, Sergeant John Eakin of the 28th Virginia was shot three times while carrying the 28th Virginia battle flag. A private was immediately shot upon picking up the battle flag, after which Colonel Robert Allen picked it up and was also immediately fatally wounded. Allen handed the flag to Lieutenant John Lee, who stepped on top of the Union wall and began waving it. The pole of the flag was shot, but Lee picked the flag back up and continued to wave it even after being wounded.

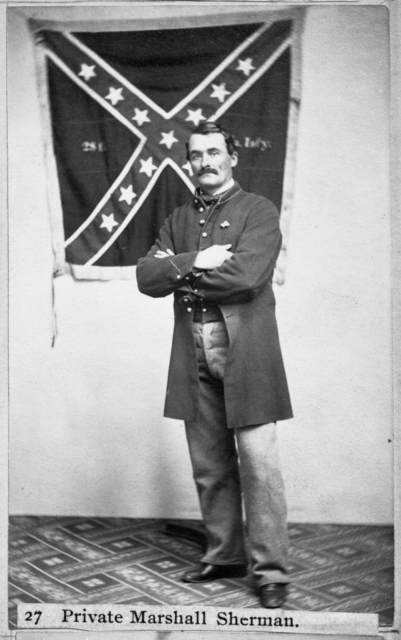
Marshall Sherman poses with the flag in 1864

The 28th Virginia battle flag was subsequently captured by Private Marshall Sherman of the 1st Minnesota Infantry Regiment, Company C. Sherman would later be awarded the Medal of Honor for his actions during the battle. Accounts of the capture vary:

=== Sherman's account ===
After the Battle of Gettysburg, Marshall Sherman told a newspaper reporter that he had run directly toward Confederate Lieutenant John Lee, eventually holding his bayonet inches from Lee's chest and saying "Throw down that flag or I'll run you through". In Sherman's account, Lee hesitated, Sherman shouted again, and Lee dropped the flag and put his hands up, after which Sherman picked up the flag and took Lee as a prisoner.

=== Daniel Bond's account ===
An account by Daniel Bond, a private in the 1st Minnesota Infantry Regiment along with Sherman, conflicts with Sherman's account. According to Bond, the flag was sighted resting unguarded against a tree, and Sherman obtained it by running to it faster than Bond could.

== Subsequent possession ==
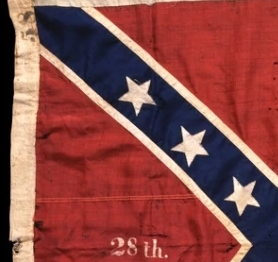
Detail of the top left corner of the 28th Virginia battle flag. Stenciled "58" from War Department inventory visible at top left.

In October 1864, the United States War Department ruled that all captured Confederate flags "belong to the United States" and were required to be deposited with the department for an inventory. The number 58 was stenciled on the 28th Virginia battle flag in this inventory, indicating that Sherman deposited it with the department at some point prior to the official inventory in 1867.

=== Possession disputes ===
==== 19th century ====
In 1887, a group of American Civil War veterans from Pennsylvania planning a reunion at Gettysburg proposed the return of Confederate battle flags from three units, including the 28th Virginia battle flag, in hopes of enticing Confederate veterans to attend. Grover Cleveland, then president of the United States, issued an executive order in support of the plan. However, many Union veterans opposed the idea, as did some Southerners. Opposers included then-Governor of Virginia Fitzhugh Lee (a Confederate veteran and the nephew of Robert E. Lee) as well as Jefferson Davis who stated that the flags belonged to the capturing states and that returning them would break "all known military precedents". Cleveland eventually rescinded his executive order; the event was successfully held without the return of flags, drawing 500 Pennsylvanian and 200 Confederate veterans.

In an 1888 inventory by the War Department, the flag was "supposed to have been loaned and never returned". One hypothesis suggests that Sherman kept the flag, though this does not explain how it was inventoried at the War Department in 1867. Alexander Ramsey may have retrieved it from the department while serving as its secretary between 1879 and 1881, and subsequently taken it to Minnesota where he became the first president of the Minnesota Historical Society. After being returned to Minnesota, the flag was periodically exhibited at the Minnesota State Capitol for several years. It was displayed prominently at Sherman's 1896 funeral, but because it was not mentioned in his will, it eventually became a part of the permanent collection at the Minnesota Historical Society.

==== 20th century ====
In 1905, the United States Congress passed a resolution directing that captured flags from the American Civil War should be returned to the places from which they originated. The resolution was intended to celebrate the cooperation between the Northern and Southern states in the Spanish-American War. However, the 28th Virginia battle flag could not be returned, as it was not in the possession of the Department of Defense.

As early as 1960, a movement in Virginia called for the "recapture" of the 28th Virginia battle flag, wanting it to be returned from Minnesota to Virginia. In 1961, Virginia requested the return of the flag in commemoration of the 100th anniversary of the Civil War, but it was not returned. The request was made by John Jennings, then director of the Virginia Historical Society, after the Minnesota Historical Society had returned a flag that had been captured from a Georgia Confederate regiment by the 2nd Minnesota Infantry Regiment. In a letter to Jennings, the director of the Minnesota society stated that the actions of the 1st Minnesota Infantry Regiment had been one of the proudest moments in the history of the state, and argued that the flag "has greater historical value if it remains in Minnesota than if it is returned to Virginia."

In 1998, Civil War reenactors in Virginia requested that the flag be returned prior to the 135th anniversary of the Battle of Gettysburg. The group was led by Chris Caveness, an insurance worker in Roanoke, Virginia who had found the 1905 congressional resolution and believed that it provided a legal basis for the request. However, the flag was not returned. Skip Humphrey, then Attorney General of Minnesota, stated that Virginia had no legal right to the flag despite the 1905 congressional resolution; he additionally noted that the flag could not be considered stolen because of the six-year statute of limitations in Minnesota. Caveness subsequently sought a loan of the flag to the Salem Museum, but was unsuccessful.

In 2000, members of the Virginia General Assembly requested the return of the flag to Virginia, but it was not returned. The group of Virginia State Senators from the southwestern portion of the state were inspired to make the request by Caveness's Civil War reenactment group and their efforts to have the flag returned. They created a resolution and brought it to the floor of the Virginia Senate. One of the resolution's sponsors, John S. Edwards, described the proposed return of the flag as "a matter of state pride" and stated that he did not know why Minnesota needed it; Ian Stewart, deputy director of the Minnesota Historical Society, responded by disagreeing with the premise that the flag was more important to Virginia than Minnesota and stated that "Unless there's a compelling legal reason to return it, we are not inclined to do so." Stewart additionally questioned why the Virginia Senate was raising an issue about a Confederate symbol, noting the then-ongoing controversy over the display of a Confederate flag in South Carolina. The Virginia Senate approved the resolution.

[The flag] was taken in a battle with the cost of the blood of all these Minnesotans. It would be a sacrilege to return it to [Virginia]. It's something that was earned through the incredible courage and valor of the men who gave their lives and risked their lives to obtain it.

— Mark Dayton, then Governor of Minnesota, in response to the Governor of Virginia's 2013 request to borrow the flag

In response to the 2000 resolution by Virginia, Minnesota Governor Jesse Ventura stated "Why? I mean, we won," and that "We took it, that makes it our heritage."

==== 21st century ====
In 2002, John S. Brown, then Chief of Military History at the United States Army Center of Military History, declared that the flag should be housed in a military history museum in Virginia.

In 2003, officials in Virginia including then-Governor of Virginia Mark Warner demanded the return of the flag; Minnesota Governor Tim Pawlenty responded that Virginia was "not getting it. [...] We believe it's rightfully ours, and we're not giving it back to Virginia."

In 2013, 150 years after the Battle of Gettysburg, the governor of Virginia requested to borrow the flag. Minnesota Governor Mark Dayton declined.

== Present condition ==
Based on photos of the 28th Virginia battle flag, less than one percent of its fabric is missing, according to Fonda Thomsen of Textile Preservation Associates, Inc. The middle eyelet is torn, while there are roughly 12 holes in the red quadrants, and some holes in the border of the fly end. The flag has not been tested for blood, though some reports have indicated that it is bloodstained. It is kept in a drawer inside a cabinet within the Minnesota Historical Society, the location of which is undisclosed for security reasons.
