= William Watts (Virginian) =

American politician

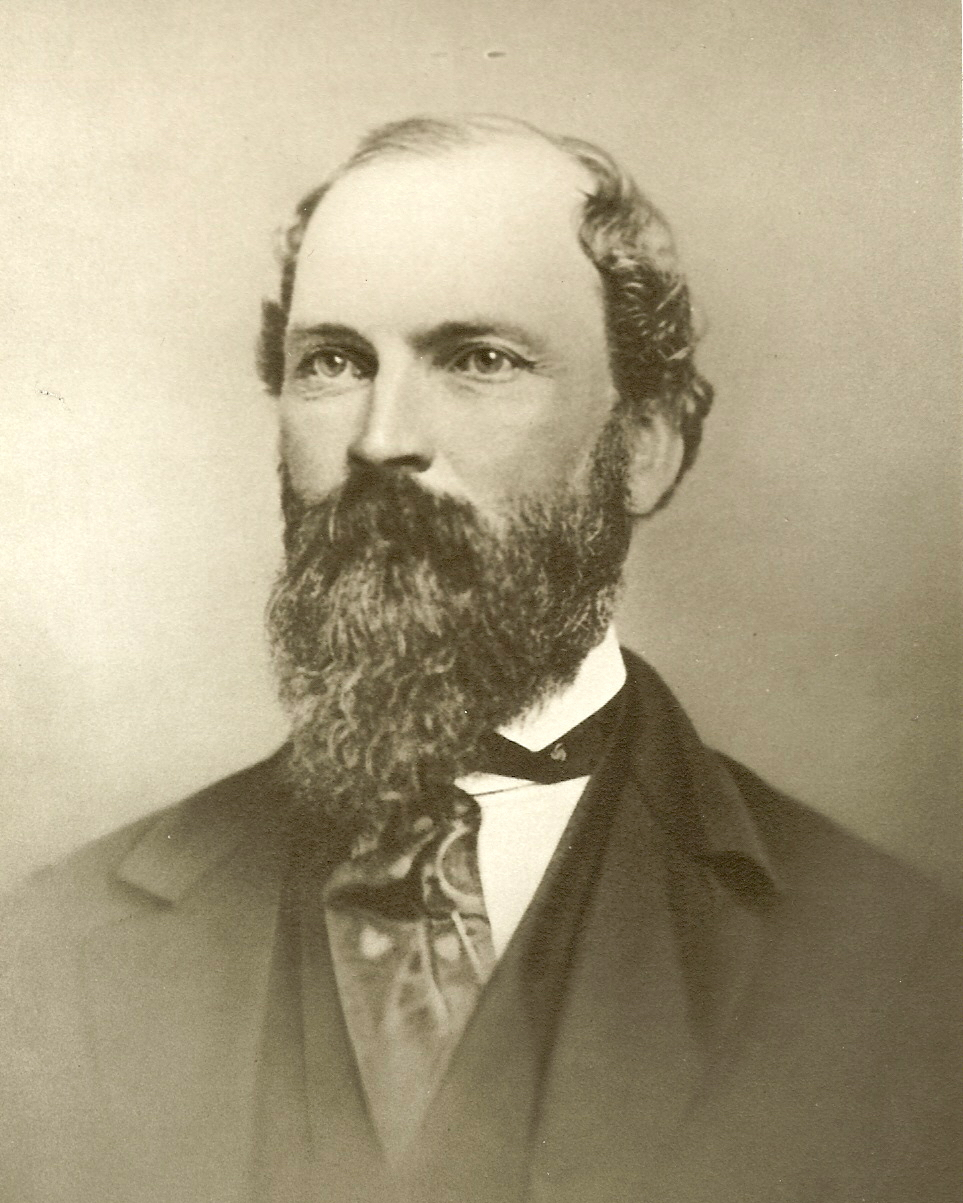

Member of the Virginia House of Delegates from Roanoke County
- In office December 1, 1875 – May 1, 1877
- Preceded by: Charles M. Webber
- Succeeded by: Henry S. Trout

Personal details
- Born: December 20, 1817 Campbell County, Virginia
- Died: May 1, 1877 (aged 59) Roanoke County, Virginia
- Party: Democratic
- Spouse: Mary Jane Allen
- Education: University of Virginia

Military service
- Allegiance: Confederate States
- Branch/service: Confederate States Army
- Years of service: 1861–1865
- Rank: Colonel
- Unit: 19th Virginia Infantry; 28th Virginia Infantry
- Battles/wars: American Civil War

William Watts (December 20, 1817 – May 1, 1877) was a nineteenth-century American lawyer, soldier and politician from Virginia. As a politician, Watts served in the Virginia House of Delegates and was elected to the Virginia Constitutional Convention of 1850.

== Early life ==
Watts was born in Campbell County, Virginia in 1817. He was educated at University of Virginia where he attained an M.D. in 1840, and a Bachelor of Laws in 1841-42.

== Career ==
The Virginia Capitol at Richmond VA where 19th century Conventions met

As an adult, Watts began a law practice Roanoke County in 1842.

Watts was the president of the Branch Bank of Virginia from 1850-61.

In 1850, Watts was elected to the Virginia Constitutional Convention of 1850. He was one of three delegates elected from the Valley delegate district made up of his home district of Roanoke County as well as Botetourt, Alleghany and Bath Counties.

During the American Civil War, Watts served in the Confederate States Army. Initially being commissioned as Major in the 19th Virginia Infantry; in 1862 he transferred to the 28th Virginia Infantry and later became Lieutenant Colonel and Colonel.

For many years, Watts served as a director of the Atlantic, Mississippi and Ohio Railroad formed by William Mahone.

Watts served in the Virginia House of Delegates 1875-77.

== Death ==
William Watts died in Roanoke County on May 1, 1877.

== Bibliography ==
- Pulliam, David Loyd (1901). The Constitutional Conventions of Virginia from the foundation of the Commonwealth to the present time. John T. West, Richmond. ISBN 978-1-2879-2059-5.
