= Marshall Sherman =

American soldier (1823–1896)

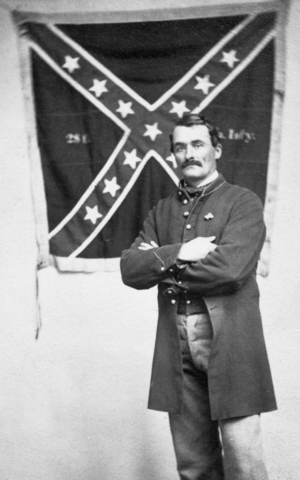
- Sherman with the 28th Virginia battle flag in 1864
- Born: c. 1823; Burlington, Vermont, US
- Died: April 19, 1896 (aged 72–73); Saint Paul, Minnesota, US
- Burial place: Oakland Cemetery, Saint Paul, Minn
- Military career
- Allegiance: United States
- Branch: US Army
- Rank: Private
- Units: Company C, 1st Minnesota Infantry
- Conflicts: Battle of Gettysburg; American Civil War
- Awards: Medal of Honor

Marshall Sherman (c. 1823 – April 19, 1896) was an American soldier who fought with the Union Army in the American Civil War. Sherman received his country's highest award for bravery during combat, the Medal of Honor, for actions taken on July 3, 1863, during the Battle of Gettysburg.

== Early life ==
Sherman was born in Burlington, Vermont, in about 1823, and in 1849 moved to Saint Paul, Minnesota Territory, in search of work as a painter. At the outset of the Civil War, at the age of 37, Sherman mustered into the 1st Minnesota Volunteer Regiment.

== Civil War service ==
The 1st Minnesota was the very first group of volunteers the Union Army received at the beginning of the Civil War. Fabled for taking part in almost every major engagement in the eastern theater of the war, Sherman was therefore involved in many battles during his three-year enlistment.

During the Battle of Gettysburg, Sherman and the rest of Company C joined the rest of their regiment at the East Cavalry Field. The days before saw the regiment lose roughly 80% of its troops after a deadly action at Plum Run. On July 3, while engaging with the 28th Virginia Infantry, Sherman captured the enemy flag, though stories of how he came to attain it differ.

According to Sherman's own reports following the war, he ran down the enemy flag bearer and forced him to hand over the flag on threat of death. Sherman then took the flag and the enemy as prisoner. However, fellow private Daniel Bond remembered seeing the flag leaning against a tree, but lost a footrace to it after Sherman, who was closer, spotted it as well.

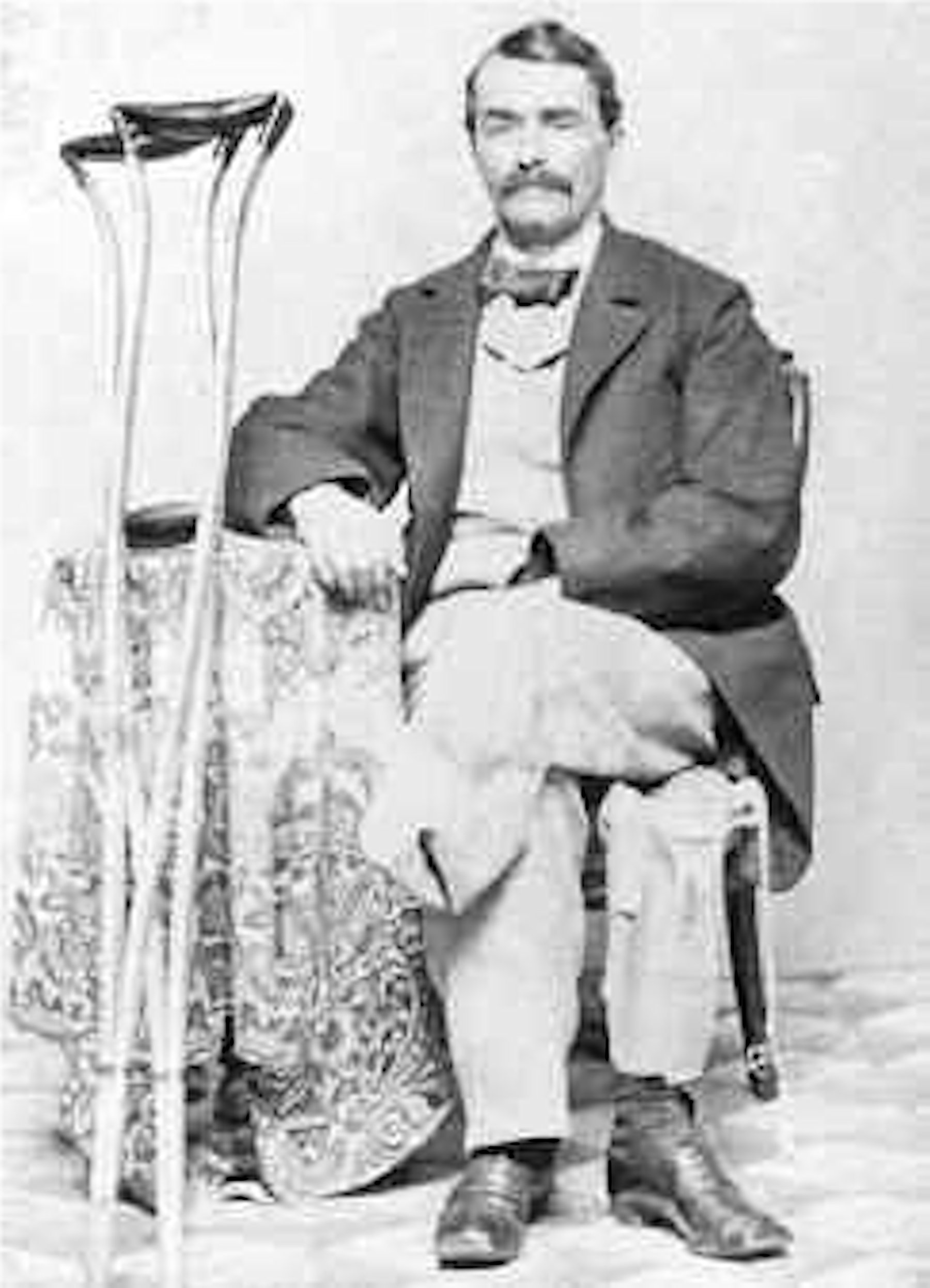
Sherman in 1867, after losing his leg

Following Gettysburg, Sherman remained in the army for another year. He lost his leg in 1864 in a skirmish near Petersburg and was mustered out of the army.

== Medal of Honor citation ==
The President of the United States of America, in the name of Congress, takes pleasure in presenting the Medal of Honor to Private Marshall Sherman, United States Army, for extraordinary heroism on 3 July 1863, while serving with Company C, 1st Minnesota Infantry, in action at Gettysburg, Pennsylvania, for capture of flag of 28th Virginia Infantry (Confederate States of America).

== Later years ==
Sherman had no apparent descendants, and very little of his life is known. He died in 1896, and the banner that he captured was displayed at his funeral. It eventually was added to the collection of the Minnesota Historical Society. He was buried in Oakland Cemetery in Saint Paul, Minnesota.
