= First National Bank (Roanoke, Virginia) =

Historic commercial building in Virginia, United States

- U.S. National Register of Historic Places
- Virginia Landmarks Register
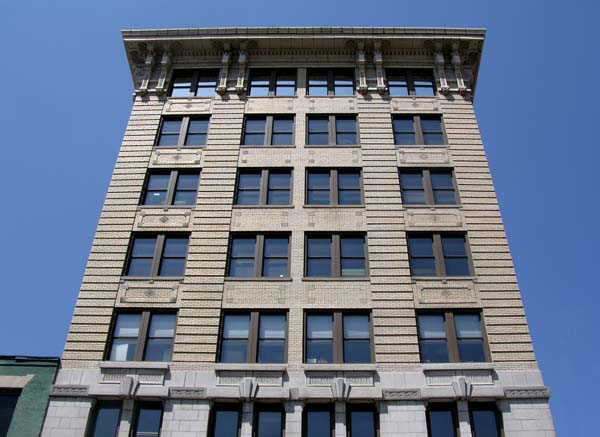
- First National Bank, June 2010

- Location within Virginia Location within the United States
- Location: 101 S. Jefferson St., Roanoke, Virginia
- Coordinates: 37°16′20″N 79°56′28″W
- Area: 0.1 acres (0.040 ha)
- Built: 1910
- Architect: John Kevan Peebles
- Architectural style: French Renaissance
- NRHP reference No.: 82004591
- VLR No.: 128-0040

Significant dates
- Added to NRHP: June 14, 1982
- Designated VLR: February 16, 1982

First National Bank, also known as People's Federal Building and Liberty Trust Co., is a historic bank and office building located at Roanoke, Virginia. It was built in 1910, and is a seven-story, granite and buff-colored brick building in the French Renaissance style. It features a Roman Ionic columned main entrance and Doric columns in the main banking hall derived from the Temple of Apollo at Delos.

The first director of the bank was Henry S. Trout. In 1926 the bank merged with the National Exchange Bank, and took that name. "When the community opened up, there were a lot of members of the Jewish community who have served on various organizations. For instance, Arthur Taubman was on the board of the First National Exchange Bank, on the board of trustees. When that became Dominion Bank, his son, Nicholas F. Taubman, served on that board of trustees, too."

It was listed on the National Register of Historic Places in 1982.
