= 28th Regiment, Virginia Infantry =

Infantry regiment of the Confederate States Army

28th Virginia Infantry Regiment
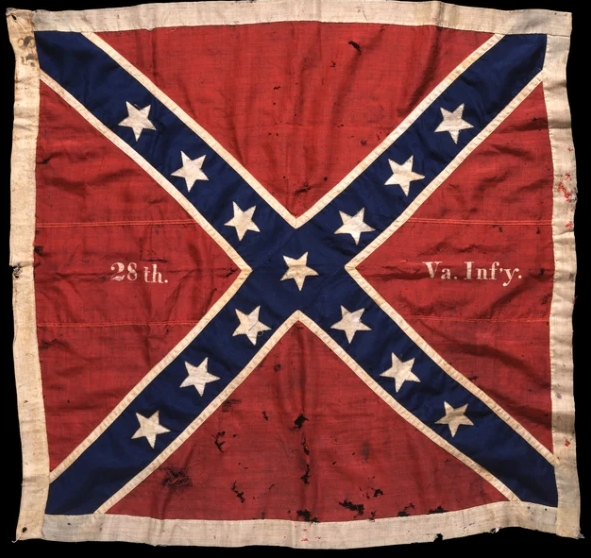
- Regimental Color captured at Gettysburg in 1863
- Active: 1861–1865
- Disbanded: April 9, 1865
- Country: Confederate States
- Allegiance: Virginia
- Branch: Army
- Type: Infantry
- Size: Regiment
- Facings: Light blue
- Battles: American Civil War; First Battle of Manassas; Peninsula Campaign; Seven Days' Battles; Battle of Williamsburg; Battle of Seven Pines; Battle of Gaines Mill; Battle of Glendale; Second Battle of Bull Run; Battle of South Mountain; Battle of Antietam; Battle of Fredericksburg; Siege of Suffolk; Battle of Gettysburg; Battle of Cold Harbor; Siege of Petersburg; Battle of Five Forks; Battle of Sailor's Creek; Appomattox Campaign

The 28th Virginia Infantry Regiment was an infantry formation of the Confederate States Army in the Eastern Theater of the American Civil War

== History ==
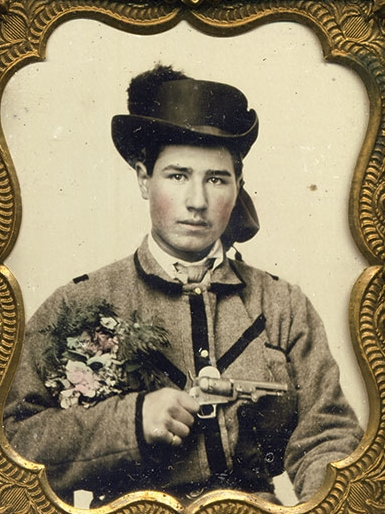
Private John Tanner of Capt. James McG. Kent's Company (Bedford Greys).

The regiment was organized at Lynchburg, in June 1861 from the counties of Botetourt, Craig, Bedford, Campbell, and Roanoke.

After fighting at First Manassas, the regiment was assigned to General Pickett's, Garnett's, and Hunton's Brigade, Army of Northern Virginia. It was active in the campaigns of the army from Williamsburg to Gettysburg except when it served with Longstreet at Suffolk. The 28th moved to North Carolina, then was on detached duty at Richmond. It fought at Cold Harbor, endured the battles and hardships of the Petersburg trenches, and was engaged in various conflicts around Appomattox.

Unidentified member of the regiment, with musket.

The regiment totaled 600 men in April, 1862, and reported 40 casualties at Williamsburg, and 47 at Seven Pines. It lost 12 killed and 52 wounded at Second Manassas, had 8 killed and 54 wounded during the Maryland Campaign, and, of the 333 engaged at Gettysburg, half were disabled. Also at Gettysburg, the regiment's battle flag was captured by the 1st Minnesota Infantry Regiment. Many were captured at Sayler's Creek, but 3 officers and 51 men survived to surrender on April 9, 1865.

Among the losses was its regimental flag which was taken by the 1st Minnesota Regiment at Gettysburg and still resides in the Minnesota Historical Society. Private Marshall Sherman of the First Minnesota Infantry captured the regiment's battle flag at Gettysburg. He was subsequently awarded the Congressional Medal of Honor.

== Notable people ==
- Henry S. Trout (1841–1918), American politician
- William Watts (1817–1877), American politician

== See also ==
- List of Virginia Civil War units
