= Williams–Brown House and Store =

Historic house in Virginia, United States

- U.S. National Register of Historic Places
- Virginia Landmarks Register
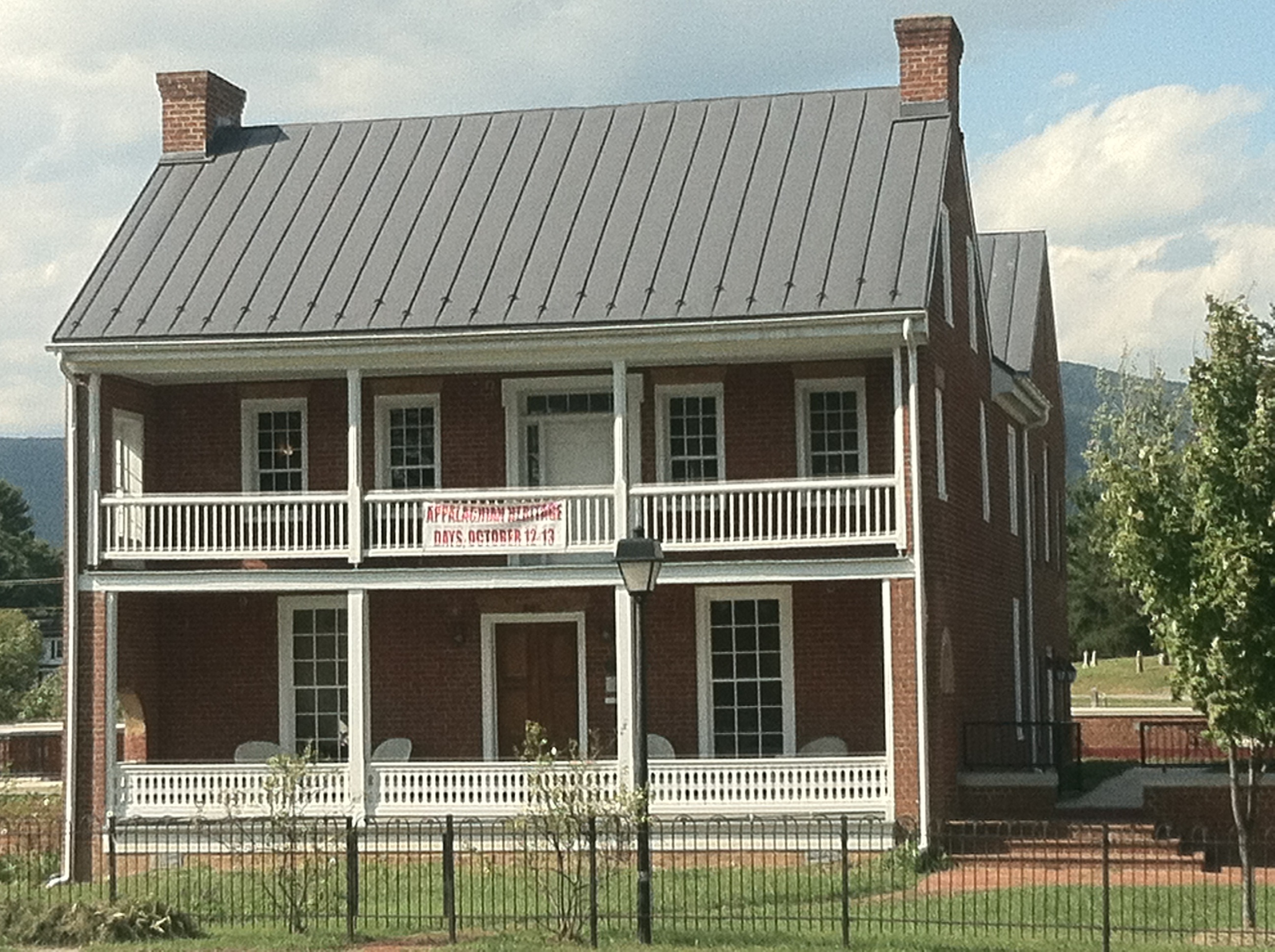
- Williams–Brown House and Store, September 2012

- Location within Virginia Location within the United States
- Location: 523 E. Main St., Salem, Virginia
- Coordinates: 37°17′38″N 80°3′7″W
- Area: 0.8 acres (0.32 ha)
- Built: c. 1837
- Built by: Williams, William C.
- Architectural style: Greek Revival, Federal
- NRHP reference No.: 71001050
- VLR No.: 129-0010

Significant dates
- Added to NRHP: November 23, 1971
- Designated VLR: July 6, 1971

Williams–Brown House and Store is a historic home and general store located at Salem, Virginia. It was built about 1837, and is a 2 1/2-story, L-shaped brick building with Greek Revival and Federal style design influences. It features a double porch with chamfered edges ending in lambs' tongues.

The house is occupied by the Salem Museum and Historical Society.

It was added to the National Register of Historic Places in 1971.
