= Prize of war =

Enemy property or land seized during war

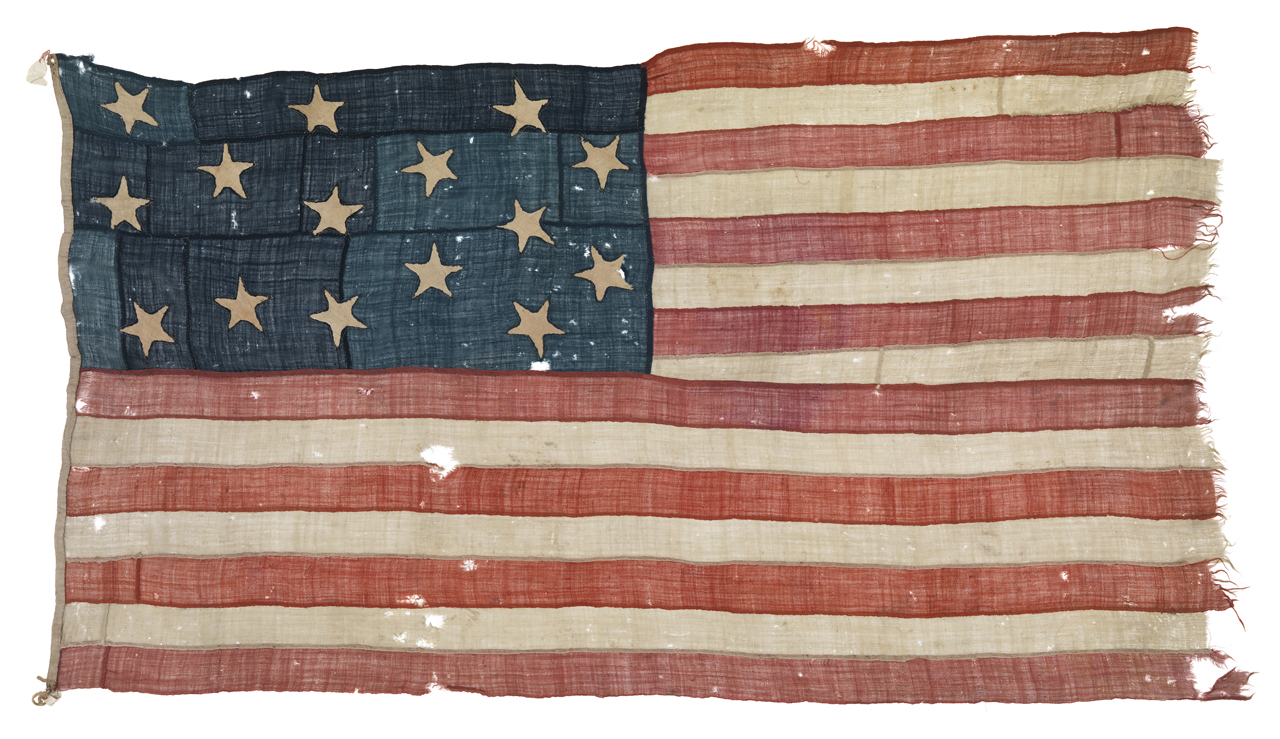
Civil ensign of an American merchant brig captured by HMS Borer during the War of 1812

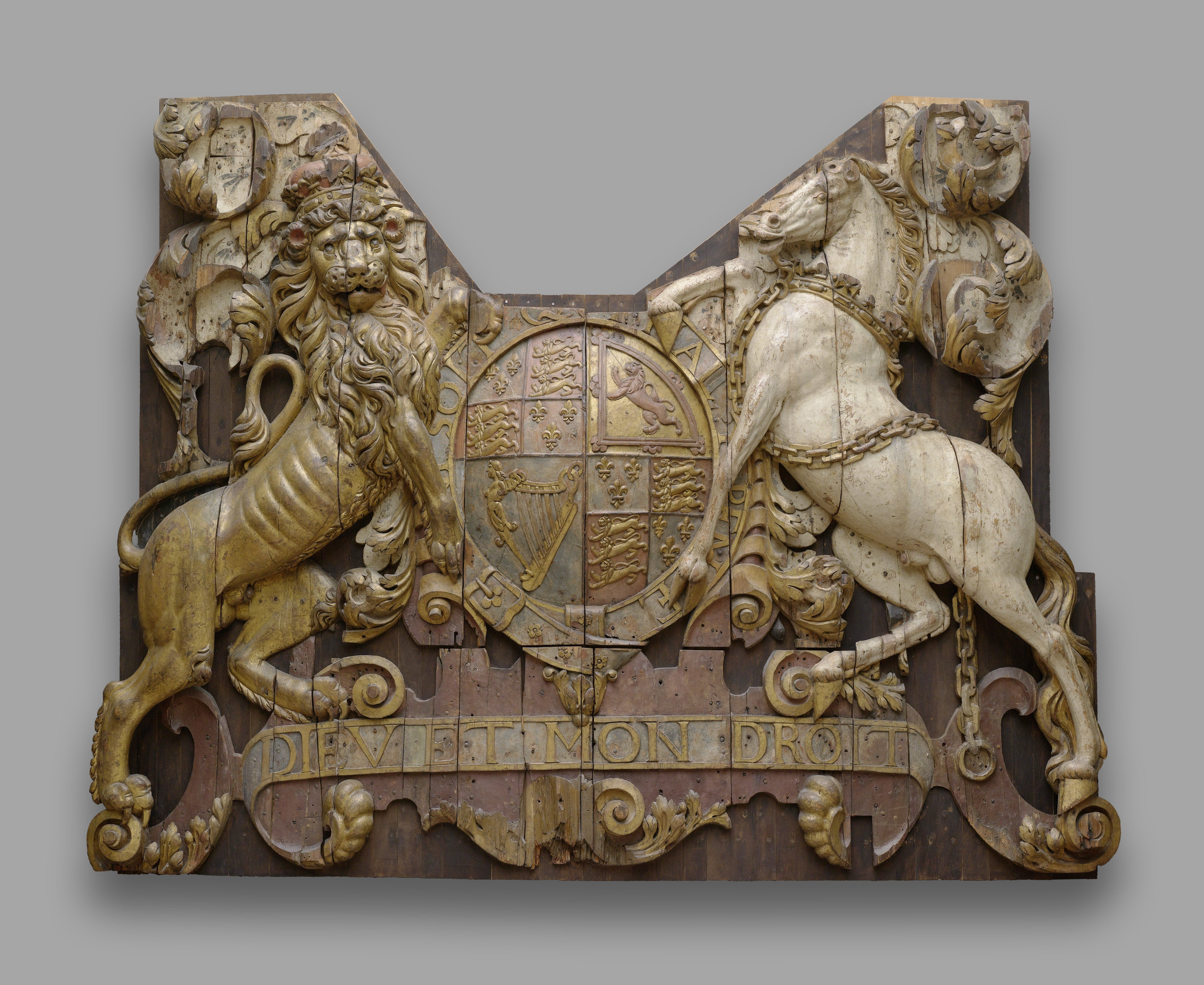
The stern piece of HMS Royal Charles, which was captured by Dutch forces during the 1667 raid on the Medway

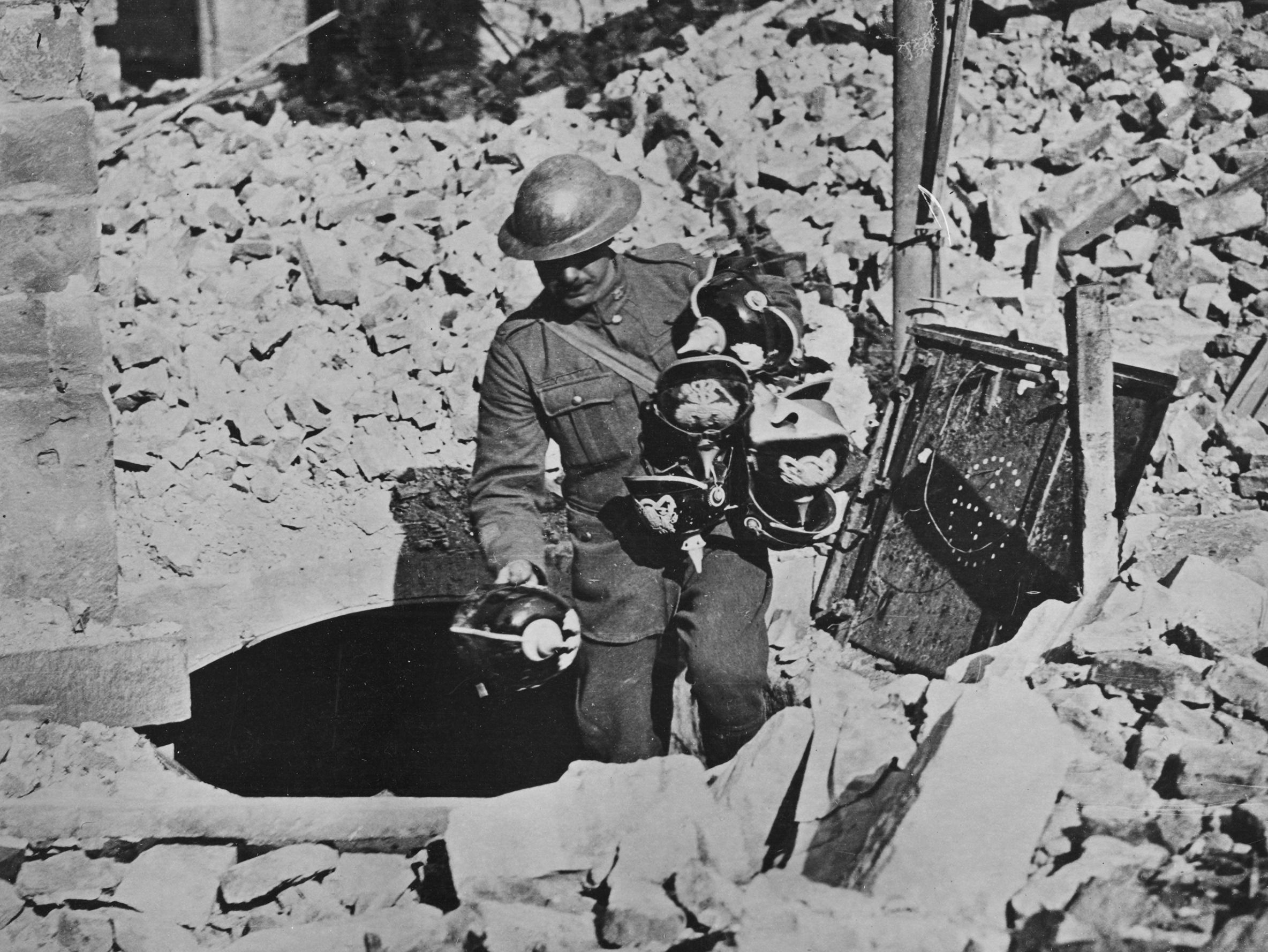
A Canadian soldier in World War I emerging from a bunker with an armful of Pickelhauben, taken as souvenirs

A prize of war (also called spoils of war, bounty or booty) is a piece of enemy property seized by a belligerent party during or after a war or battle. This term was used nearly exclusively in terms of captured ships during the 18th and 19th centuries.

== Basis in international law ==
Rules defining how prizes were claimed and administered originated before there were organized government navies and were an outgrowth of privateering. Current international treaties provide for the retention of personal property by captured soldiers as well as issues of personal equipment in their possession when captured (including clothing, helmets, rank insignia and medals, and protective equipment such as gas masks), but excluding certain issue items such as weapons, horses, maps, and military documents. Non-personal equipment, vehicles, artillery pieces, ships, stockpiles of food and other material belongs to the capturing state and it may be used without any restriction.

== Notable prize-takings ==
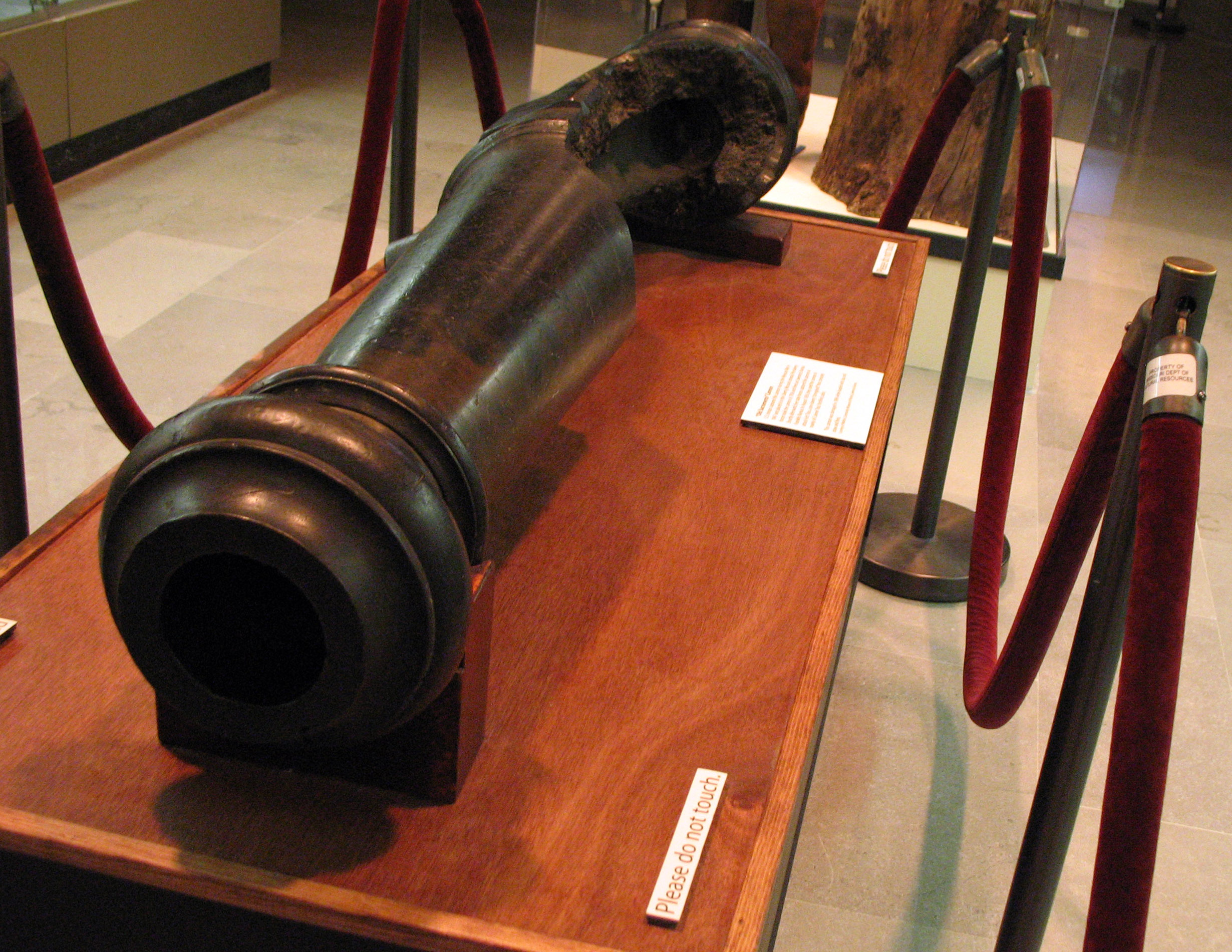
Cannon taken from Mexico in 1847, later captured in fighting in Kansas

The 28th Virginia battle flag, from the American Civil War, is a Confederate battle flag that belonged to the 28th Virginia Infantry Regiment. Captured by the 1st Minnesota Infantry Regiment at the Battle of Gettysburg, the flag was brought to Minnesota and exhibited at the state's capitol for several years before passing into the permanent collection of the Minnesota Historical Society after 1896 where it has remained since. Although various groups in Virginia have requested that the flag be returned, beginning as early as 1960, Minnesota has repeatedly declined to return it, with Governor Jesse Ventura asking "Why? I mean, we won."

Prizes in World War II included a German submarine later called HMS Graph, and U-505 which was captured by elements of the United States Navy in a task force commanded by then-Captain Daniel V. Gallery. U-505 currently is a museum ship at the Museum of Science and Industry in Chicago.

Although not taken in combat, three Gorch Fock-class barques were confiscated from Germany as reparation prizes at the conclusion of World War II, one of which remains in US service as USCGC Eagle.

The passenger ship HMT Empire Windrush, which had a notable role in the post-war history of the United Kingdom, was originally a German ship, confiscated after the war.

The Russian ship Kruzenshtern, the largest traditional sailing vessel currently in operation, was originally the German ship Padua, before being taken over by the Soviet Union in 1946.

Quantities of Iraqi military material captured during the Gulf War are held by US museums.

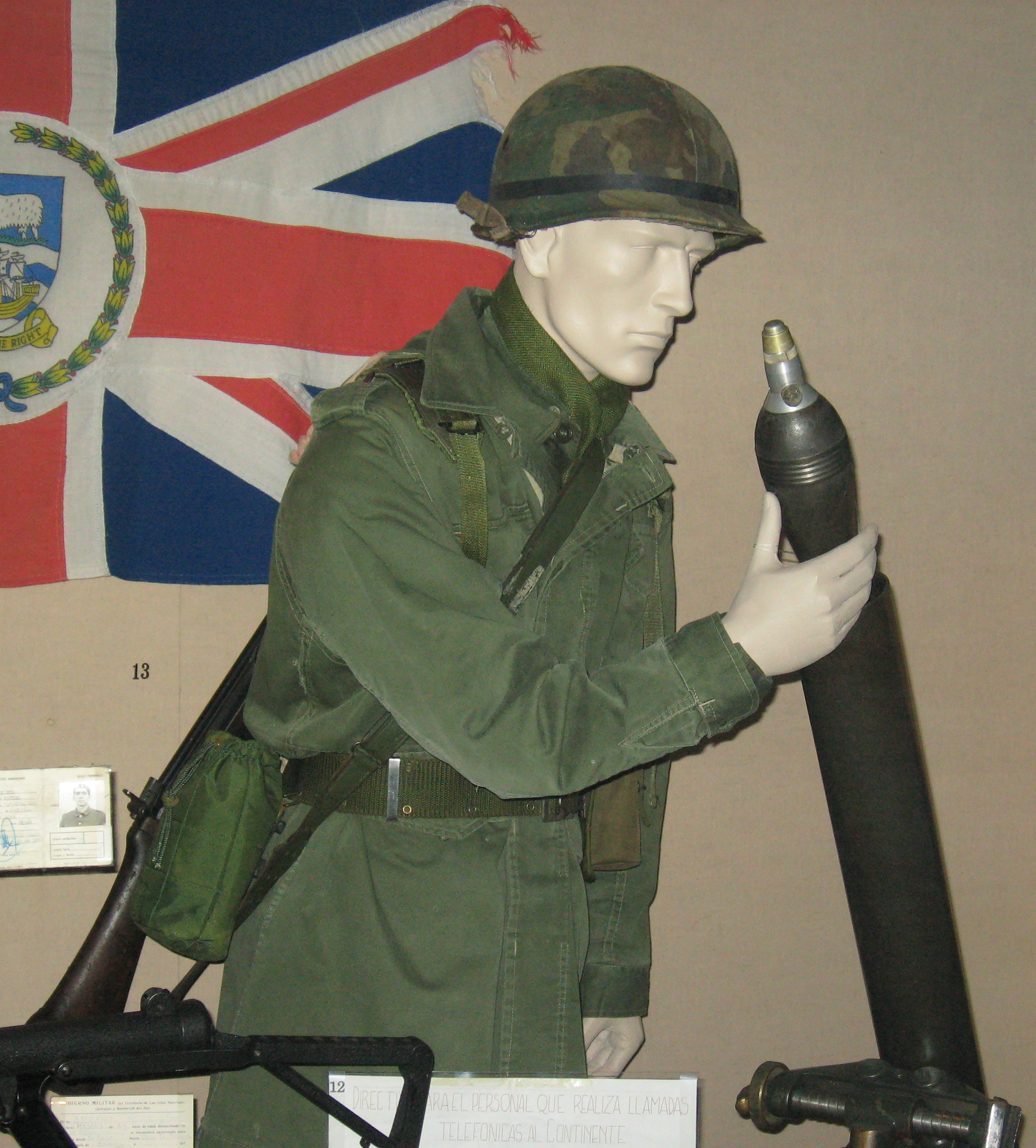
Captured Argentine infantry equipment on display in the Imperial War Museum

Material captured as a result of the Falklands War was reused by the British Armed Forces. This included two Agusta A109 helicopters captured by the British SAS from the Argentine Army, which were then used by the British Army Air Corps until 2007. Oerlikon GDF-002 AA guns and Skyguard FC radars were put into service by the Royal Auxiliary Air Force for some 10 years. After this, the radars were deployed by the RAF Police to detect illegal low flying, and are still used at the RAF's electronic warfare range at RAF Spadeadam.

== See also ==
- List of ships captured in the 18th century
- List of ships captured in the 19th century
- Blockade runners of the American Civil War
- Prize money
- Spolia opima, armour and arms a Roman general stripped from the body of an opposing commander slain in single combat
- War looting
- War trophy
