= 1879 Minnesota Attorney General election =

- November 4, 1879
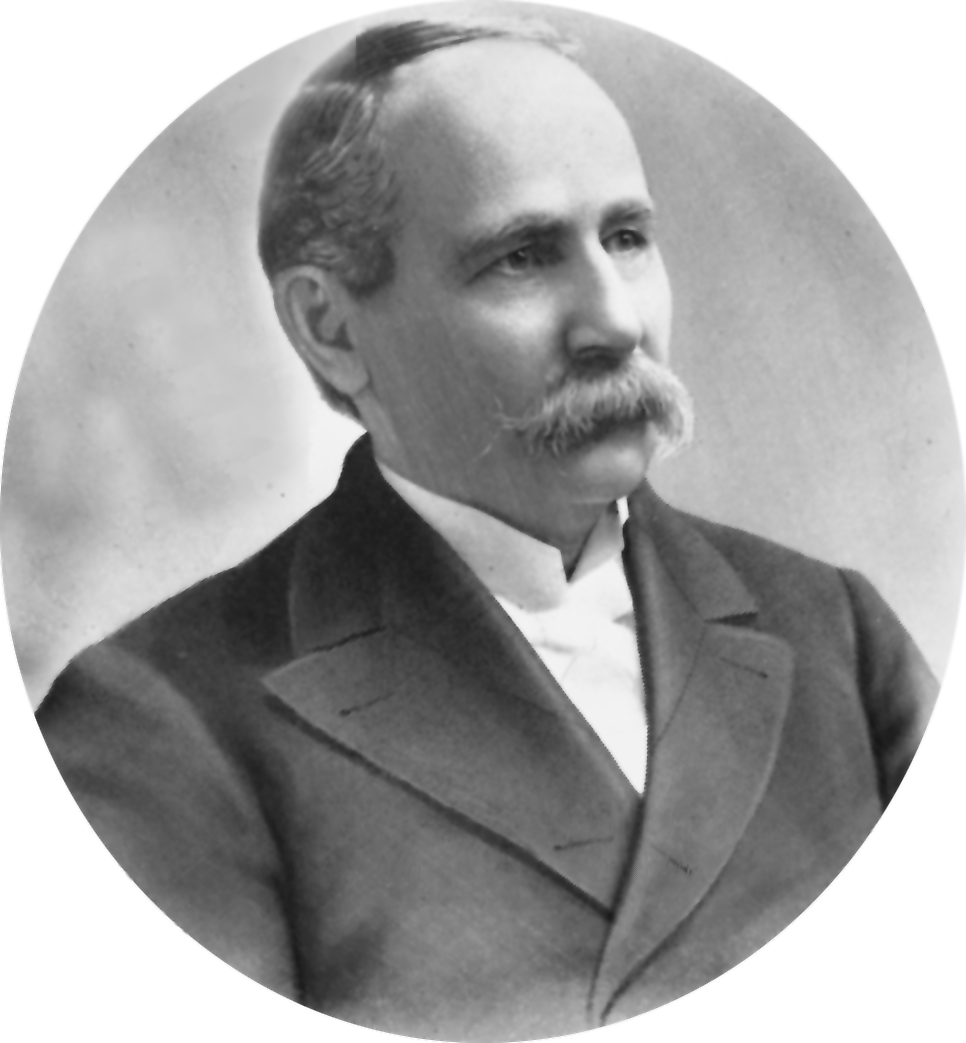

Nominee	Charles M. Start	P.M. Babcock
Party	Republican	Democratic
Popular vote	60,816	38,604
Percentage	57.28%	36.36%
Attorney General before election
George P. Wilson
Republican
Elected Attorney General
Charles M. Start
Republican

The 1879 Minnesota Attorney General election was held on November 4, 1879, in order to elect the attorney general of Minnesota. Republican nominee Charles M. Start defeated Democratic nominee P.M. Babcock, Greenback Labor nominee Oscar Stephenson and Prohibition nominee Alfred W. Bangs.

== General election ==
On election day, November 4, 1879, Republican nominee Charles M. Start won the election by a margin of 22,212 votes against his foremost opponent Democratic nominee P.M. Babcock, thereby retaining Republican control over the office of attorney general. Start was sworn in as the 6th attorney general of Minnesota on January 7, 1880.

=== Results ===
Minnesota Attorney General election, 1879
Party	Candidate	Votes	%
Republican	Charles M. Start	60,816	57.28
Democratic	P.M. Babcock	38,604	36.36
Greenback	Oscar Stephenson	4,064	3.83
Prohibition	Alfred W. Bangs	2,697	2.53
Total votes		106,181	100.00
Republican hold			
