= John W. Jones (soldier) =

Minnesota soldier (1823–1886)

Captain John W. Jones
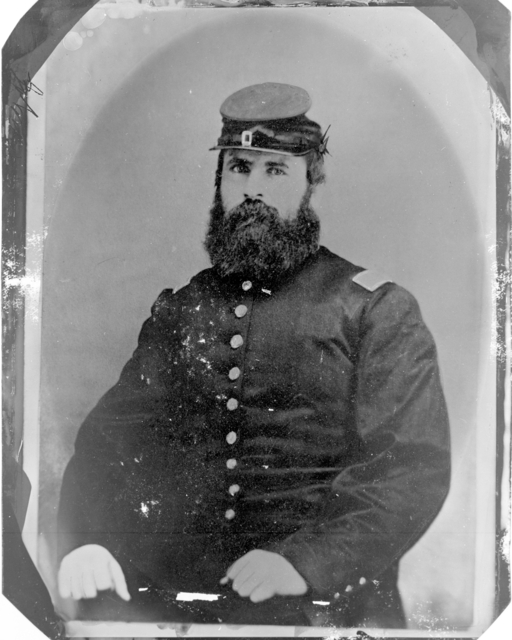
- Jones c.1865
- Born: 1823; Middlesex, England
- Died: May 4, 1886 (aged 62–63); Saint Paul, Minnesota
- Burial place: Oakland Cemetery
- Military career
- Service years: 1845-1866
- Rank: Ordnance Sergeant; Captain
- Units: Company K, 1st Regiment of Artillery; United States Army Ordnance Corps; 3rd Minnesota Light Artillery Battery
- Conflicts: Mexican-American War; Battle of Monterrey; Siege of Veracruz; Battle of Cerro Gordo; Battle of Contreras; Battle of Churubusco (WIA); Battle for Mexico City; Sioux Wars; Dakota War of 1862; Battle of Fort Ridgely; Sibley's 1863 Campaign; Battle of Big Mound; Battle of Dead Buffalo Lake; Battle of Stony Lake; Sully's Expedition (1863–1864); Battle of Killdeer Mountain; Battle of the Badlands

John W. Jones (c.1823 - May 4, 1886) was an English-American soldier who served in both the Mexican–American War and the American Civil War. During the Dakota War of 1862 Jones served as the Ordnance Sergeant of Fort Ridgely and was instrumental in the defense of Fort Ridgely alongside Lieutenant Timothy J. Sheehan during the Battle of Fort Ridgely. During the battle it is stated that Jones's cannon fire was critical in holding back the attacking Dakota under Chief Little Crow which ultimately saved the fort.

== Early life and military career ==
John W. Jones was born in the county of Middlesex in England in 1823. Jones immigrated to the United States sometime before 1845.

=== Mexican American War ===
Jones volunteered for service in the United States Army beginning on August 20, 1845 and served in the Mexican–American War with Company K of the 1st Regiment of Artillery. While serving in the 1st Regiment of Artillery Jones was the drill and gunnery instructor for Thomas W. Sherman who later served in the American Civil War as a Major General.

Jones earned an official commendation letter from President of the United States James K. Polk following the Battle of Monterrey for his conduct during the battle. Jones subsequently fought at the Siege of Veracruz, the Battle of Cerro Gordo, the Battle of Contreras, the Battle of Churubusco, and the Battle for Mexico City. Jones was wounded in the neck on August 20, 1847 at the Battle of Churubusco which ultimately led to his reassignment to non-active duty following the Mexican-American War. Jones served in Company K of the 1st Artillery Regiment until February 8, 1856 when he was promoted to the rank of Ordnance Sergeant.

=== Artillery instructor ===
Jones was later stationed at Fort Ridgely in Minnesota Territory by February 1856 where he was the fort's Ordnance Sergeant and placed in charge of the fort's cannons and ammunition as part of the United States Army Ordnance Corps. Jones was considered for promotion to the rank of Captain to lead the 1st Minnesota Light Artillery Battery, however this role was appointed to Emil D. Munch. Later in 1862, several companies of the 5th Minnesota Infantry Regiment were also garrisoned at the fort with Jones. During this time Jones instructed the men of the 5th Minnesota in lessons of artillery gunnery, how to handle cannons, and maintain them. This would later be critical to the defense of the fort during the Dakota War of 1862.

=== Battle of Fort Ridgely ===
During the Battle of Fort Ridgely Jones was able to create three ad hoc artillery detachments around the fort which guarded against Dakota surprise attacks. These detachments consisted of Sergeant Jones and an experienced artilleryman Dennis O'Shea manning one M1841 6-pounder field gun, and Sergeant James G. McGrew of Company B of the 5th Minnesota and a civilian from the Lower Sioux Agency J.C. Whipple, who manned two separate batteries of M1841 mountain howitzer cannons. Jones's precision in artillery allowed the defending garrison to distribute men to weaker areas along the fort's perimeter and allowed the Fort Ridgely garrison to hold its own against the Dakota forces.

Timothy J. Sheehan's after action report from August 26, 1862 states the following regarding Jones's gunnery:

"The engagement lasted until dusk, when the Indians, finding that they could not effect a lodgment, which was prevented, in a great measure, by the superior fire of the artillery, under the immediate charge of Ordnance Sergeant J. Jones, United States Army, which compelled them to evacuate the ravines by which this post is surrounded, withdrew their forces, and the gallant little garrison rested on their arms, ready for any attack ".

=== Later service ===
Jones was lauded amongst the defenders of Fort Ridgely for his pivotal role in the battle and his expertise in cannon gunnery. For his precision and bravery at Fort Ridgely, Jones was promoted to the rank of Captain on February 26, 1863. Jones's commission to the rank of Captain was followed by an appointment to lead the 3rd Minnesota Light Artillery Battery, a new light artillery battery raised to fight in the Dakota Territory. The 3rd Minnesota Light Artillery Battery would fight in both Sibley's 1863 Campaign under Henry Hastings Sibley and again during Sully's Expedition under General Alfred Sully. Jones was mustered out of service with the 3rd Minnesota Light Artillery Battery on February 27, 1866.

In 1881 Jones requested the United States Congress asking for permission to draw a military disability pension for his services rendered at Fort Ridgely during the Dakota War. Jones died on May 4, 1886 at age 62-63. He is buried in block 44, lot 178 of the Oakland Cemetery in Saint Paul, Minnesota.

== Personal life ==
Jones was married to Maria Jones, he had a total of 4 children, only 3 of which survived their infancy. Jones's first child was a stillbirth during the Battle of Fort Ridgely.
