= John R. Jones (Minnesota politician) =

American politician (1828–1900)

Member of the Minnesota Senate from the 9th District
- In office December 2, 1857 – December 6, 1859 Serving with Samuel Hull
- Succeeded by: Reuben Wells

District Attorney of Fillmore County, Minnesota
- In office 1857–1860

Postmaster of Fillmore County, Minnesota
- In office 1885–1887

Personal details
- Born: May 18, 1828 Champaign County, Ohio, U.S.
- Died: June 26, 1900 (aged 72) Chatfield, Minnesota, U.S.

Military service
- Allegiance: United States of America
- Branch/service: Union Army
- Years of service: 1863–1865
- Rank: Major
- Unit: 2nd Minnesota Cavalry Regiment
- Commands: Company A, 2nd Minnesota Cavalry
- Battles/wars: Sioux Wars; Sully's Expedition (1863–1864); Battle of Killdeer Mountain; Battle of the Badlands

John R. Jones (May 18, 1828 – June 26, 1900) was an American lawyer, politician, soldier, and early citizen of Chatfield, Minnesota. Jones served a single term in the Minnesota Legislature and was the district attorney of Fillmore County, Minnesota. Jones was later a candidate for the offices of Minnesota Secretary of State and Minnesota Attorney General.

== Early life ==
Jones was born on May 18, 1828 in Champaign County, Ohio.^{:543} Jones was the son of Reverend Stephen Jones (1807–1879), also of Champaign County, who was an Episcopal clergyman.^{:543}^{:1120} In 1842 Jones and his family moved to Beaver Dam, Wisconsin where he read law under a local lawyer, George W. Green.^{:543}

In 1852 Jones relocated to southern Minnesota and briefly lived in Dubuque, Iowa, he was admitted to the bar in Delhi, Iowa.^{:543} Jones permanently moved to Minnesota Territory in 1854 and settled in Chatfield, Minnesota.^{:543} Jones was a member of the village council when Chatfield was formerly incorporated in 1857.^{:} That same year Jones was elected as one of the two district attorneys of Fillmore County alongside Grove W. Willis, Jones would serve in this role until 1860.^{:94}

== Politics ==
Jones first ran for political office in 1857 as Democrat for a seat in the Minnesota Senate representing Minnesota's 9th Senate district. Jones won the October 13, 1857 election alongside Samuel Hill as representatives of the 9th Senate district. Jones would serve in the 1st Minnesota Legislature from December 2, 1857 to December 6, 1859. During his term he was the chairman of the Minnesota State Prison Committee and served on the Education and Sciences and Judiciary Committees.

== Military service ==
In the aftermath of the Dakota War of 1862 Jones volunteered for service in the Union Army on November 2, 1863 and was enrolled into the ranks of Company A of the 2nd Minnesota Cavalry Regiment as a Captain.^{:143}^{:707} Jones and the 2nd Minnesota Cavalry Regiment fought in Sully's Expedition in 1863 and 1864 at the Battle of Killdeer Mountain and the Battle of the Badlands, and rescuing James L. Fisk's wagon train at Fort Dilts in Dakota Territory. Jones was promoted to the rank of Major on May 1, 1865.^{:705} Jones was mustered out of service in November 1865.^{:705}

== Later life ==
In 1865 Jones campaigned for the office of Minnesota Secretary of State as a Democrat candidate. Jones won 42.68% of the vote but lost to Republican candidate Henry C. Rogers who won 57.32% of the vote with a margin of +14.64%. Jones later campaigned in 1877 for the office of Minnesota Attorney General. Jones won 38.74% of the vote but ultimately lost to George P. Wilson who secured 58.92% of the vote with a margin of +20.17%. Jones later served as the postmaster of Fillmore County from February, 1855 until his resignation in 1887.^{:1113}

Jones died on June 26, 1900 in Chatfield at the age of 72, he is buried in Chatfield cemetery.

== Personal life ==
Jones was married to A. D. Crawford in 1849, together they adopted two children.
