= Henry C. Rogers (politician) =

"Minnesota Secretary of State", "American Civil War Veteran"

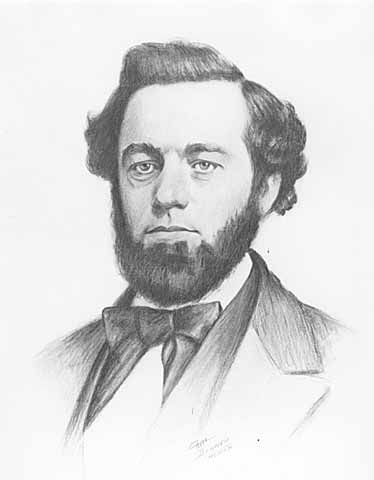
- Portrait of Rogers by Carl Bohnen

4th Minnesota Secretary of State
- In office January 8, 1866 – January 7, 1870
- Governor: William R. Marshall
- Preceded by: David Blakeley
- Succeeded by: Hans Mattson

Member of the Minnesota Legislature
- In office 1859–1860 (Minnesota Senate); 1862–1863 (Minnesota House of Representatives)

Personal details
- Born: c. 1834 Danby, Vermont, U.S.
- Died: May 8, 1871 Mower County, Minnesota, U.S.
- Resting place: Greenwood Cemetery; Brownsdale, Minnesota
- Other political affiliations: Republican

Military service
- Allegiance: United States of America
- Branch/service: Union Army
- Years of service: 1862–1865
- Rank: Lieutenant Colonel
- Unit: Company C, 9th Minnesota Infantry Regiment; 8th Minnesota Infantry Regiment
- Commands: 8th Minnesota Infantry Regiment
- Battles/wars: Dakota War of 1862; Battle of Wood Lake; American Indian Wars; Sully's Expedition (1863–1864); Battle of Killdeer Mountain; Battle of the Badlands; American Civil War; Franklin–Nashville Campaign; Third Battle of Murfreesboro (WIA)

Henry C. Rogers (c. 1834 – May 8, 1871), sometimes written as H.C. Rogers, was a Minnesota politician, an early settler of Mower County, Minnesota, and a veteran of both the American Civil War and the American Indian Wars. During his political career in Minnesota Rogers served in the Minnesota Legislature in both the Minnesota House of Representatives and Minnesota Senate. Rogers later served as the fourth Minnesota Secretary of State from January 8, 1866 to January 7, 1870.

== Early life ==
Rogers was born in 1834 in Danby in Rutland County, Vermont, his parents were Aaron Rogers Jr. and Comfort Stimson Rogers. Rogers first settled in Mower County in Minnesota Territory starting in 1856 where he lived in Austin and worked as a farmer and in the mercantile trade. On October 8, 1858 Rogers was elected to the Minnesota Senate representing the 13th District of Minnesota which included both Dodge County, Minnesota and Mower County, Minnesota. During the 2nd Minnesota Legislature Rogers was a member of the Agriculture and Manufactures Committee and was the Chair of the Indian Affairs Committee. In 1862 Rogers was elected to the Minnesota House of Representatives representing District 15. During the 4th Minnesota Legislature Rogers was a member of the Public Lands Committee and was the Chairman of the ways and means committee.

== Military service ==
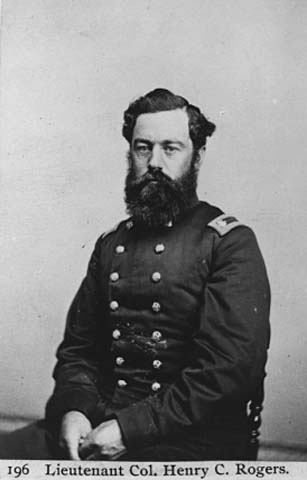
Lieutenant Colonel Rogers during the American Civil War c.1863

Rogers enlisted into the Union Army on August 26, 1862 during the immediate aftermath of the Dakota War of 1862. Rogers initially served as the Captain of company C of the 9th Minnesota Infantry Regiment and fought at the Battle of Wood Lake, the final engagement of the Dakota War of 1862.

On November 14, 1862 appointed as the Lieutenant Colonel of the 8th Minnesota Infantry Regiment under Colonel Minor T. Thomas. Rogers would fight alongside the 8th Minnesota during Sully's Expedition from 1863 to 1864. Sully's Expedition was a punitive expedition led by Alfred Sully in response to the Dakota War. Rogers would ultimately take part in the Battle of Killdeer Mountain and the Battle of the Badlands along with the rest of the regiment.

In late 1864 the 8th Minnesota was rerouted to the south fight in the Franklin–Nashville campaign. During this time Colonel Minor had been promoted to the rank of Brigadier General to command the 3rd Brigade, 1st Division, XXIII Corps, which left Rogers in command of the 8th Minnesota from 1864-1865. Rogers would ultimately be wounded in action during the Third Battle of Murfreesboro. Rogers was subsequently discharged from service on May 15, 1865 due to his wounds.

== Postwar career and death ==
Immediately following the war Rogers continued to serve in the field of Minnesota politics, most notably serving as the Minnesota Secretary of State, later from 1869 to 1870 he was appointed as the pension agent of Minnesota. Rogers won the 1865 Minnesota Secretary of State election against John R. Jones and was sworn into office on January 8, 1866. In 1867 Rogers successfully defeated Amos Coggswell in the 1867 Minnesota Secretary of State election. Due to failing health from his injuries sustained at Murfreesboro, Rogers decided against seeking reelection in the 1869 Minnesota Secretary of State election, which was won by Minnesota Republican politician Hans Mattson.

Like many American Civil War veterans, Rogers died on May 8, 1870 due to his wound he received at Murfreesboro . Rogers is buried in Greenwood Cemetery in Brownsdale, Minnesota.

Political offices
Preceded by David Blakeley	Secretary of State of Minnesota; 1862-1866	Succeeded by Hans Mattson
