= Sully's Expedition (1863–1864) =

Punitive military expedition

Sully's Expedition Sully's Campaign of 1863-1864
- Part of the Sioux Wars and the American Civil War
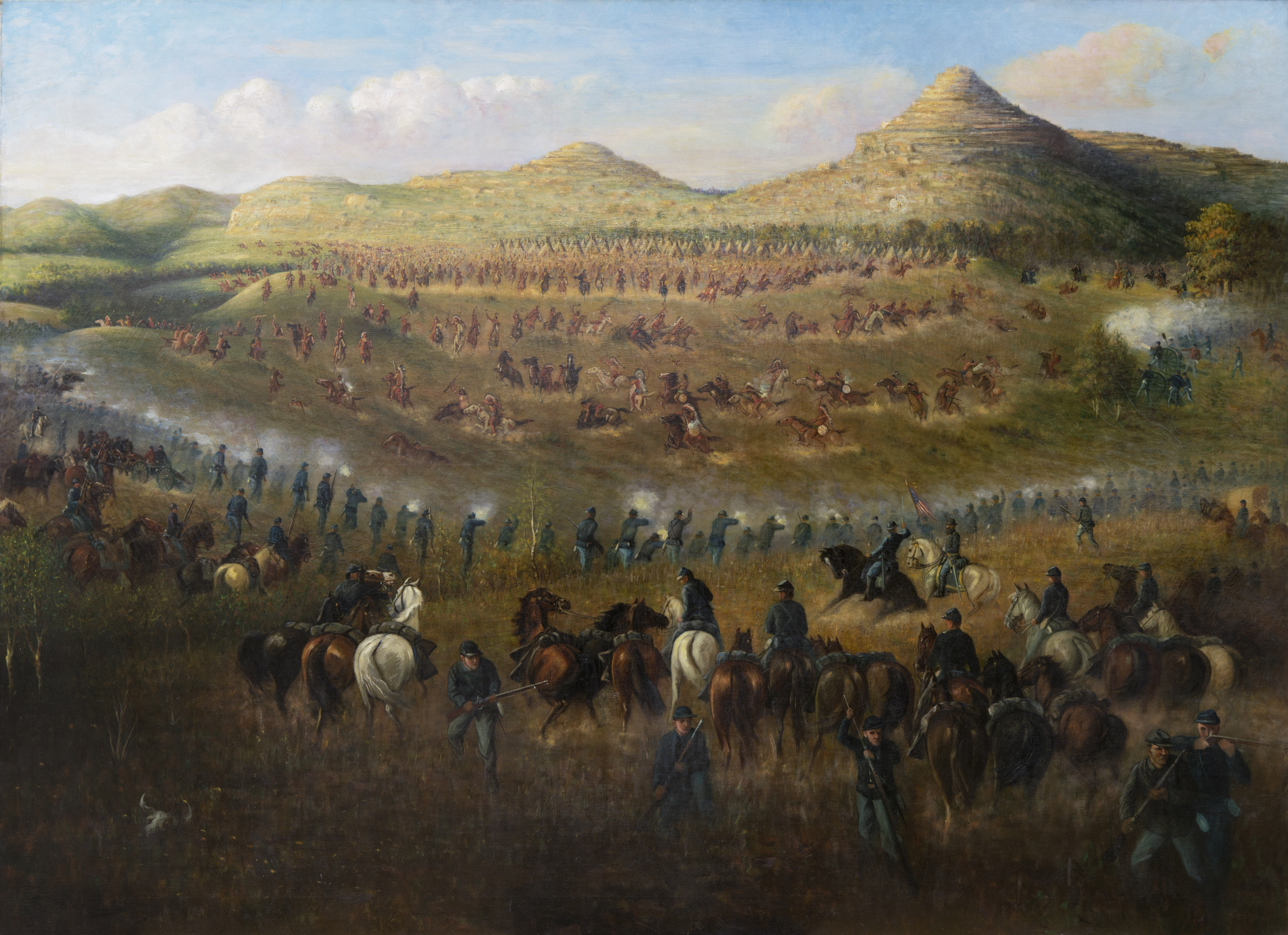
- The 8th Minnesota Infantry Regiment during the Battle of Killdeer Mountain by Carl L. Boeckmann
Date	August, 1863 - September, 1864
Location	Dakota Territory; Present-day North Dakota and South Dakota
Result	United States victory

Belligerents
United States of America	Lakota, Yanktonai, Santee Dakota, Teton (Hunkpapa, Sihasapa), Sioux, and Blackfeet

Commanders and leaders
Alfred Sully; Minor T. Thomas (1864)	Gall; Sitting Bull; Inkpaduta

Units involved
First Brigade: Brackett's Minnesota Cavalry Battalion; 1st Dakota Cavalry Battalion; 2nd Nebraska Cavalry Regiment; 6th Iowa Cavalry Regiment; 7th Iowa Cavalry Regiment; 4 Mountain Howitzers; Second Brigade (Minnesota Brigade): 2nd Minnesota Cavalry Regiment; 3rd Minnesota Light Artillery Battery; 8th Minnesota Infantry Regiment (mounted)	Gall's Band; Sitting Bull's Band; Inkpaduta's Band; Multiple civilians and warriors

Strength
1,200 soldiers (1863); 2,200 soldiers (1864)	Between 600 to 1,500 warriors; multiple noncombatants including women and children

Casualties and losses
22 killed, 38 wounded (Whitestone); 5 dead, 10 wounded (Killdeer)	~200 killed and wounded, including women and children 156 prisoners (Whitestone); 31 dead possibly more (Killdeer); Thousands displaced 500+ Tipis burned

Sully's Expedition, also called Sully's Campaign of 1863-1864 was a series of two major punitive expeditions led by General Alfred Sully during the immediate aftermath of the Dakota War of 1862. The campaign was aimed at displacing the Dakota people, Yanktonai, and Lakota people out of the border region with the state of Minnesota in the Dakota Territory. The campaign primarily took place in a series of confrontations in the modern-day states of South Dakota and North Dakota and includes the Battle of Whitestone Hill, the Battle of Killdeer Mountain, and the Battle of the Badlands. The expeditions took place in two major waves, first from June to August 1863, and again from July to September 1864.

== Background ==
In the Spring of 1863 Union Army General John Pope, commander of the Department of the Northwest, feared a repeat of the Dakota War of 1862 and that Minnesota's frontier was dangerously exposed. To mitigate the possibility of another uprising Pope designed a two-pronged punitive expedition to be carried out by General Henry Hastings Sibley and General Alfred Sully. Previous to the expedition Sully had been placed in command of the Military District of Iowa and Sibley in command of the Military District of Minnesota.

Pope's strategy was to send two large columns of infantry, artillery, and cavalry into the neighboring Dakota Territory, one force under Sibley and the other under Sully. As Sibley would drive his forces westward pushing the Dakota further into central Dakota Territory past the Missouri River, Sully meanwhile would ascend the Missouri River northward and rendezvous with Sibley on July 25, 1863, to cut off any lines of retreat for the Dakota and kill or capture the remaining hostile Dakota. Although practical on paper, in reality Pope's plan was much less of a success.

== The Campaign ==
=== Organization of Forces (1863) ===
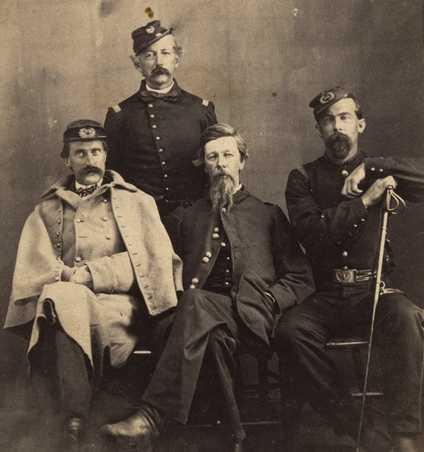
General Alfred Sully (seated at center) with (left to right): John H. Pell, Andrew J. Levering, and Josias R. King, c. 1862.

Sully's force for the 1863 stage of the expedition consisted of a brigade made up of the following units: the 6th Iowa Cavalry Regiment, the 7th Iowa Cavalry Regiment, the 2nd Nebraska Cavalry Regiment, and an artillery battery of Howitzers. Sully's force was around 1,200 men total and was headquartered at Fort Randall. On August 14, 1863, Sully left Fort Randall with his brigade following the Missouri River northward in order to meet Sibley. Sibley however, was engaged with Dakota in three large battles; the Battle of Big Mound, the Battle of Dead Buffalo Lake, and the Battle of Stony Lake. After several days of not making contact with Sully's brigade by the July 25 deadline Sibley returned to Minnesota.

After finding Sibley's old camp, Sully learned from his scouts that the Dakota Sibley had pursued during the previous battles had crossed the Missouri River and had returned to their hunting grounds near the headwaters of the James River. In early September Sully had learned from several captured Dakota that Inkpaduta was encamped nearby, he then ordered his 1,200 cavalrymen to the northwest to search for Inkpaduta and his Band of Dakota.

=== The Battle of Whitestone Hill (September 3–5, 1863) ===
"I believe I can safely say I gave them one of the most severe punishments that the Indians have ever received" - General Sully speaking about Whitestone Hill.

On September 3, 1863, Major Alfred E. House, the officer in command of Sully's forward scouting force encountered a large mass of Sioux, Dakota, and Lakota Indians northeast of present-day Ashley, North Dakota at a place called Whitestone Hill. The Dakota were encamped near the base of the hill and had not expected Major House's detachment. Major House immediately dismounted and engaged the Dakota in a nearby ravine. It was not until two hours later that Sully was able to bring up the main force of cavalry and drive Inkpaduta's force into another ravine, the resulting skirmish eventually became the Battle of Whitestone Hill and ended in a victory for Sully's brigade. Following the battle, Sully's force captured a large number of women and children who were forced to march to the Crow Creek Indian Reservation where many Dakota had been sent to following the 1862 Uprising. During the battle Sully's force "killed more than 200 Sioux, took more than 150 prisoners, and destroyed all the Indian's possessions, including 400,000 pounds of dried buffalo meat".

=== Organization of Forces (1864) ===
In 1864 Pope ordered Sully to form a second expedition into Dakota Territory which was nearly identical to the 1863 campaign. Officially named the Northwestern Indian Expedition, the expedition this time would consist of two brigades of cavalry, each with an attached artillery battery. Sully would have overall command of both brigades during the expedition. The First Brigade which was assembled at Sioux City, Iowa, consisted of the: 6th Iowa Cavalry Regiment, 3 companies of the 7th Iowa Cavalry Regiment, 2 companies of the 1st Dakota Cavalry Battalion, Brackett's Minnesota Cavalry Battalion, and 1 artillery battery of four M1841 mountain howitzers under the command of Captain Nathaniel Pope.

The Second Brigade, dubbed the "Minnesota Brigade", was an all-Minnesota brigade led by Minor T. Thomas which consisted of: the 8th Minnesota Infantry Regiment (mounted), six companies of the 2nd Minnesota Cavalry Regiment, and the 3rd Minnesota Light Artillery Battery under the command of Captain John W. Jones. Jones was a notable veteran of the Dakota War of 1862 whose cannon fire helped save Fort Ridgley during the Battle of Fort Ridgely.

=== The Battle of Killdeer Mountain (July 28–29, 1864) ===
Sully's two columns united on June 29 and July 7, 1864, at Fort Rice on the Missouri River. As the expedition headed north it would be resupplied via steamboats which followed Sully's command as it progressed further into Dakota territory. Sully's Ho-Chunk and friendly Dakota scouts informed Sully of a large group of Dakota 130 miles north of the Little Missouri River. Sully, eager to curtail Dakota resistance followed his scouts north, however, Sully was over encumbered by his laden wagon train of military and some civilian personnel. Sully temporarily left his wagon train and civilians at what is now Sully's Heart River Corral, a base camp near modern-day Richardton, North Dakota. On July 28 Metis scout Frank LaFramboise informed Sully that he had spotted a Sioux encampment 10 miles from Sully's camp at a place the local Sioux called Killdeer Mountain (Dakota: Tahkahokuty/ Tachawakute). Sully's force of 2,200 men and 8 howitzers quickly moved to the location of the camp.

When Sully's force arrived at the camp the two sides traded insults with one another before firing. After the first shots were made Sully's force quickly skirmished before forming in an infantry square formation and slowly moved forward, which allowed the 8 batteries of mountain howitzers to conduct devastating fire upon the Sioux. As Sully's square advanced the defending Sioux could do little more than charge Sully's force or take long-distance shots with the firearms. Eventually the defending Sioux focused on protecting those who could retreat and attempted to save what they could from the camp. On July 31 Sully returned to the Heart River corral where he was able to reassemble his column follow the Heart River en route to Sentinel Butte and the Yellowstone River towards the Badlands.

=== The Battle of the Badlands (7–9 August 1864) ===
Sully described the Badlands region of the Dakotas as "Hell with the fires burned out". Sully with his two brigades and wagon trains struggled heavily to cross the Badlands region towards the Yellowstone River, where they expecting to find steamboats with supplies and provisions. This plan changed however, as the Sioux engaged Sully in a "running skirmish" known as the Battle of the Badlands. With low water and food for his men, as well as for his pack animals and cavalry horses, Sully and his brigades eventually reached the Yellowstone River and the steamboats on August 12 and headed down the river towards Fort Union. Lacking sufficient horses and provisions to continue the campaign, Sully ended the campaign and returned down river. Sully's brigades eventually returned to Minnesota in early September, 1864.

== Aftermath ==
Following both Sully's 1863 and 1864 campaigns, the Dakota were split into smaller groups and were forcefully displaced into Canada and west of the Missouri River and Yellowstone River. Similar to Sibley's 1863 Campaign, Sully's campaigns significantly reduced the Dakota's capability to threaten Minnesota settlements. Sully's campaigns against the Sioux, Dakota, and Lakota would be just one of several campaigns and battles over the next several decades which are ultimately referred to in the broader historical context as the "Sioux Wars".

== Legacy ==
Historians have debated the effect that Sully's campaigns of 1863-1864 really had on the various Indigenous people who fought in the conflict. Minnesota author and historian Colin Mustful argues that Sully's Expedition was an "expensive endeavor that unnecessarily punished innocent people. It was argued that the expeditions were too sweeping and indiscriminate and that the money would have been better spent if given to the Indians in annual [annuity] installments".
