= 3rd Minnesota Light Artillery Battery =

- Flag of Minnesota
- Active: February 2, 1863, to February 27, 1866
- Country: United States
- Allegiance: Union
- Branch: Artillery
- Engagements: American Civil War: Sibley's 1863 Campaign; Battle of Big Mound; Battle of Dead Buffalo Lake; Battle of Stony Lake; Sully's Expedition (1863–1864); Battle of Killdeer Mountain; Battle of the Badlands

Commanders
- Notable commanders: John W. Jones

The 3rd Minnesota Light Artillery Battery was a Minnesota USV artillery battery that served in the Union Army during the American Civil War and the American Indian Wars.

== Service ==
The 3rd Minnesota Light Artillery Battery was mustered in at Fort Snelling, Minnesota, between February 2 and May 1, 1863, and was made up of enlisted men of the 6th, 7th, 8th, 9th, and 10th Minnesota Volunteer Infantry Regiments. It participated in Sibley's Expedition against hostile Indians in Dakota Territory from June 16 until September 12, 1863.

In this campaign the battery saw actions at Big Hills, Dakota Territory on July 24, at Dead Buffalo Lake, Dakota Territory on July 26, and at Stony Lake, Dakota Territory on July 28. It was then on the Missouri River from July 29–30. The 4th Section moved as escort to General Ramsey, U.S. Commissioner, from Sauk Centre to Fort Abercrombie to a treaty with Chippewa Indians at Red Lake River Crossing, then was stationed at Fort Ripley until May, 1864.

The 2nd Section served at Pembina, Dakota Territory from October 1863, until May 1864. The 3rd Section stationed at Fort Ridgely until May 1864, and the 1st Section was at Fort Snelling until May 1864. The battery then participated in Brigadier General Alfred Sully's Northwestern Indian Expedition against "hostile" Sioux west of the Missouri River between June 4 and November 10, 1864. The battalion marched to Fort Sully from June 4–15, 1864, and pursued Indians into the Badlands from July 19–28. It participated in the Battle of Tah Kah A Kuty or Killdeer Mountain, Dakota Territory on July 28, 1864, and after that action it marched to Fort Rice, Dakota Territory from June 28 to July 7, 1864.

The battery then made the passage of the Badlands in Dakota Territory from August 3–18. During this time, it fought in the engagement near the Little Missouri River at Two Hills, called the Battle of the Badlands, Dakota Territory, on August 8–9, 1864. The unit also helped in the rescue of Fisk's Emigrant train from September 10–30, 1864, then marched down the Yellowstone River in Montana Territory to Fort Union, Dakota Territory. The 1st Section was then stationed at Fort Ripley, the 3rd Section at Fort Sisseton, and the 2nd and 4th sections at Fort Ridgely until May 1865. Then the 1st, 2nd, and 4th sections went on an expedition against hostile Indians in Dakota Territory from June to October 1865. The 1st Section was then moved to Fort Abercrombie, and the rest of Battery at Fort Wadsworth until February, 1866. The 3rd Minnesota Light Artillery Battery was finally mustered out at St. Paul, Minnesota, on February 27, 1866.

== Commander ==
- Captain John W. Jones - February 25, 1863, to February 27, 1866

== Casualties and total strength ==
The 3rd Minnesota Battery lost no men who were killed in action or who died of wounds received in battle, but did have 4 enlisted men who died of disease, for total fatalities of 4.

== See also ==
- List of Minnesota Civil War Units
