= Department of the Northwest =

Department of the United States Army from 1862 to 1866

The Department of the Northwest was a U.S. Army department created on September 6, 1862, to put down the Sioux uprising in Minnesota. Major General John Pope was made commander of the department. At the end of the Civil War the department was redesignated the Department of Dakota.

Immediately upon arriving in St. Paul, General Pope sent letters to the Governors of Iowa and Wisconsin for additional troops to assist the 5th Minnesota Infantry Regiment. From Iowa he received the 27th Iowa Infantry Regiment and from Wisconsin the 25th Wisconsin Infantry Regiment. Both quickly crossed the border to assist with the uprising. The 25th Wisconsin was in Minnesota three months and the 27th Iowa was there a month before both headed south. After they departed, the Minnesota District would be garrisoned by Minnesota units: the 5th, 6th, 7th, 8th, 9th, and 10th Infantry Regiments, the 1st and 2nd Minnesota Cavalry Regiments, plus the Minnesota Independent Cavalry Battalion (Hatch's Battalion) as well as the 3rd Minnesota Light Artillery Battery. In 1864 companies of the 30th Wisconsin Infantry Regiment saw service in the Minnesota and Dakota Districts, too.

From November 17, 1862, the department was divided into four districts for a short time. The First District was composed of the Iowa and Dakota Territory, the Second was the vicinity of Fort Snelling, the Third was the vicinity of Fort Ripley and the Fourth was the vicinity of Fort Abercrombie. These last three districts were merged into the District of Minnesota on November 23, 1862. The First District remained until June 1, 1863, when the Dakota Territory was merged into the District of Dakota and Iowa into the District of Iowa. Wisconsin was also a district. The Montana Territory was added to the Department on May 26, 1864. The Department of the Northwest, Department of Kansas, and Department of Missouri were combined to form the Division of Missouri on January 30, 1865. On February 17, 1865, the Montana and Dakota Territories west of 110 degrees west longitude were also attached with Major General Pope, who was elevated to commander of the division.

The Department of the Northwest through the remainder of the Civil War consisted of the Districts of Wisconsin (under Brig. Gen. Thomas A. Davies), Minnesota (Brig. Gen. Henry H. Sibley) and Iowa (Brig. Gen. Alfred Sully). The Department of the Northwest was merged with the Department of the Missouri on June 27, 1865. In 1866 most of the Department of the Northwest was reorganized as the Department of Dakota.

The department's forces comprised the Sibley and Sully Expeditions of 1863 as well as Sully's Northwest Indian Expeditions of 1864 and 1865. All of these actions were against the Sioux in the Dakota Territory.

== Commanders ==
=== Department of the Northwest ===
- Maj. Gen. John Pope Sept. 16, 1862 – Nov. 28, 1862
- Brig. Gen. Washington L. Elliott Nov. 28, 1862 – Feb. 18, 1863
- Maj. Gen. John Pope Feb. 13, 1863 – Feb. 18, 1865
- Maj. Gen. Samuel R. Curtis Feb. 13, 1865 – June 27, 1865

==== 1st District, Department of the Northwest (incl. Iowa and Territory of Dakota) ====
- Brig-Gen John Cook Nov. 17, 1862 – June 1, 1863

==== District of Iowa (incl. Territory of Dakota) ====
- Brig-Gen Alfred Sully June 1, 1863 – April, 1865

==== 2nd District, Department of the Northwest (vicinity of Fort Snelling, Mn) ====
- Col. Henry Hastings Sibley Nov. 17, 1862 – Nov. 23, 1862

==== 3rd District, Department of the Northwest (vicinity of Fort Ripley, Mn) ====
- Lt. Col. Minor T. Thomas Nov. 17, 1862 – Nov. 23, 1862

==== 4th District, Department of the Northwest (vicinity of Fort Abercrombie, Mn) ====
- Francis Peteler Nov. 17, 1862 – Nov. 23, 1862

==== District of Minnesota, (consolidated from 2nd, 3rd and 4th Districts) ====
- Brig-Gen. Henry Hastings Sibley Nov. 23, 1862 – August 1866

==== District of Wisconsin ====
- Brig. Gen. Thomas C. H. Smith ? - Dec. 1863
- Brig. Gen. Thomas A. Davies ? - ?

== Posts in the Department of the Northwest ==
=== Wisconsin ===
- Camp Barstow (1861–1862), Janesville.
- Camp Bragg (1861–1862), Oshkosh.
- Fort Howard (1861–1863), Green Bay.
- Camp Hamilton (1861–1862), Fond du Lac. Renamed Camp Wood (1862).
- Camp Harvey (1861–1862), Kenosha.
- Camp Holton (1861–1865), Milwaukee. Renamed Camp Reno in 1864.
- Camp Randall (1861–1865), Madison.
- Camp Scott (1861), Milwaukee.
- Camp Sigel (1861), Milwaukee.
- Camp Washburn (1861–1865), Milwaukee.
- Camp Utley (1861–1862), Racine.
- Camp Trowbridge (1862), Milwaukee.

=== Minnesota ===
- Camp Release (1863–1864), near Montevideo
- Camp Yellow Medicine (1863), near Granite Falls
- Fort Pipestone (1863), Pipestone
- Fort Ridgely (1853–1867), near Fairfax
- Fort Ripley (1848–1877), within Camp Ripley
- Fort Sanborn (1862–1863), Georgetown
- Fort Snelling (1861–1946), St. Paul

=== Iowa ===
- Camp Burnside (1862), Des Moines
- Camp McClellan (1861–1865), Davenport. Located on the riverfront at McClellan Park.
- Camp Kearny (1863–1865), Davenport It was a prison stockade for Sioux Indians captured after the Sioux Uprising in Minnesota. Located adjacent to Camp McClellan.
- Fort Defiance (1862–1864), Estherville
- Fort Williams (1862–1865), Fort Dodge

=== Nebraska Territory ===
- Fort Kearny (1848–1871), near Kearney, Nebraska

=== Dakota Territory ===
- Fort Abercrombie (1857–1878), Abercrombie, North Dakota
- Fort Berthold (1862–1874), two sites now under Lake Sakakawea, within Fort Berthold Indian Reservation, North Dakota
- Fort Buford (1865–1895), Buford, North Dakota
- Fort Benton (1847–1881), Fort Benton, Montana
- Post on Devils Lake (1863–1864), Fort Totten, North Dakota
  - Fort Hays (1864)
- Fort Pierre (1859–1863), Fort Pierre, South Dakota
- Fort Randall (1856–1892), (US Army Corps of Engineers – Fort Randall Project) near Pickstown, South Dakota
- Fort Rice (1864–1879), at the Fort Rice State Historic Site approximately 30 miles south of Mandan, North Dakota
- Fort Sisseton (1864–1889), near Lake City, South Dakota
- Camp Sully (1863–1864), Heart River Corral State Historic Site near Richardton, North Dakota
- Fort Sully (1863–1866), Farm Island State Recreation Area near Pierre, South Dakota
- Fort Union (1864–65), Buford, North Dakota

== Events, skirmishes, and battles ==
=== 1862 ===
- August 4, Dakota break into food warehouses at the Lower Sioux Agency.
- August 17, a band of Dakota killed 5 white civilian settlers in Acton Township, Minnesota.
- August 18, Battle of Lower Sioux Agency and Battle of Redwood Ferry.
- August 19, 1st Battle of New Ulm
- August 20 – August 22, Battle of Fort Ridgely
- August 23, 2nd Battle of New Ulm
- August 30 – September 23, Siege of Fort Abercrombie
- September 2, Battle of Birch Coulee
- September 6, Department of the Northwest formed, comprising Minnesota, Wisconsin,

Iowa, and the territories of Dakota and Nebraska with headquarters in St. Paul.

- September 16, Major General John Pope arrives at St. Paul and takes command of the department.
- September 23, Battle of Wood Lake, Little Crow forced to flee to Canada.
- September 26, Surrender at Camp Release
- September 28 - November 3, Col. Sibley, with questionable authority and jurisdiction, forms a military tribunal to try 393 Dakota prisoners for "murder and other outrages." 323 accused were convicted and 303 sentenced to death.
- December 26, 38 Dakota prisoners hanged in Mankato, Minnesota. President Abraham Lincoln personally reversed the sentences for all but these, at least one of whom was a victim of mistaken identity.

=== 1863 ===
- June 16 – September 13, Sibley's Expedition against Indians in Dakota Territory.
- July 3, Little Crow was killed near Hutchinson, Minnesota.
- July 24, Battle of Big Mound
- July 25, Sully's troops arrived at Fort Pierre missing the rendezvous with Sibley at Long Lake. Sully was forced to wait two more weeks for his steamboats, delayed by extreme low water in the Missouri River caused by a drought.
- July 26, Battle of Dead Buffalo Lake
- July 28, Battle of Stony Lake
- July 31, With no sign of Sully at Long Lake and his horses worn down from the campaign, Sibley decides to abandon the operation and march back to Minnesota.
- Mid-August, Sully, loaded the available supplies and 23 days of rations onto borrowed wagons and marched overland toward Devils Lake.
- Late August, Sully's command reached rendezvous site at Long Lake. Sully knowing he had missed Sibley, turned southeast to attack Dakota that had returned to the east side of the Missouri River to hunt buffalo following the departure of Sibley.
- September 3–5, Battle of Whitestone Hill. Sioux driven west of the Missouri River.

=== 1864 ===
- June 5 – October 15, Sully's Northwestern Expedition of 1864 against hostile Indians west of the Missouri River.
  - June 6–30, 2nd (Wisconsin) Brigade marches 332 miles from Fort Ridgley to join Sully Expedition at Swan Lake.
  - July 9–18, Sully Expedition crosses Missouri River at Fort Rice.
  - July 28, Battle of Killdeer Mountain
  - August 7–9, Battle of the Badlands
  - September 2–20, an Idaho bound wagon train led by Captain James L. Fisk holds off attacking Sioux at an improvised Fort Dilts, near Rhame, North Dakota.
  - September 20, Fort Dilts relieved by a detachment from Sully's Expedition.

=== 1865 ===
- January 30, Department of the Northwest attached to the Military Division of the Missouri.
- March 28, District of the Plains formed, to consisting of the Districts of Utah, Colorado, and Nebraska, with Brig. Gen. Patrick E. Connor, assigned to its command.
- Spring, General Sully was ordered to provide one of 4 columns for Gen. Patrick E. Connor's Powder River Expedition.
- Late Spring, Santee Sioux raid into Minnesota led by Jack Campbell killed 5 members of the Jewett family near Mankato, the last civilians killed in the Indian Wars in Minnesota. Campbell, drunk, was soon caught and hung. Santee Scouts working for the Army killed the remainder of the band soon after. Sully's force was diverted to attack hostiles, thought to be the source of the raid, near Devils Lake.
- June 27, Department of the Northwest was merged with the Department of the Missouri.
- July 5 – September 13, Sully's Northwestern Expedition of 1865.
  - July 13–22, Sully arrives at Fort Rice, negotiates treaties with some the bands he fought with the previous year.
  - July 23 – Aug 1, Sully marches from Fort Rice to north of Devils Lake looking for hostile Sioux, believed to have raided Minnesota.
  - August 2–8, Finding no hostiles, Sully turns west to Mouse River and then Fort Berthold.
  - August 25, Sully returns to Fort Rice, which drives off a Sioux force that had been attacking the Fort.
  - September 13, Sully returns to Fort Sully ending the campaign.
- November 11, After being kidnapped in Canada and subjected to a summary military trial, Dakotas Shakpe and Medicine Bottle are hanged at Fort Snelling.
