= 1st Nebraska Militia =

The 1st Nebraska Militia was a temporary military force mobilized by Territorial Governor Alvin Saunders in August, 1864 during the Indian uprising of 1864 which threatened travelers on the Overland Trail and settlers on the frontier. The 1st Nebraska Militia reinforced the 7th Iowa Cavalry Regiment, which had previously been deployed and had constructed Fort McPherson near present-day North Platte, Nebraska, and the 1st Nebraska Veteran Cavalry Regiment.

The Nebraska MILITIA were frontiersmen who furnished their own horses and arms. They were, as soldiers, first-class in every respect. The companies were small but efficient.

== Companies ==
- First Regiment, Second Brigade:
  - Company A: fifty-three men with a captain, a first lieutenant, and a second lieutenant, mustered into service August 12, 1864 who served four months and nine days.
  - Company B: fifty-three men with a captain, a first lieutenant, and a second lieutenant, mustered into service August 13, 186i who served six months.
  - Company C: fifty-seven men with a captain, a first lieutenant, and a second lieutenant, mustered into service August 24, 1864 who served five months and thirteen days.
- First Regiment, First Brigade:
  - Company A: forty-seven men with a captain, a first lieutenant, and a second lieutenant, mustered into the service August 30, 1864 who served two months and twelve days.
- A detachment of artillery militia under command of Captain Edward P. Childs, numbering thirteen men, rank and file, was mustered into the service August 30, 1864, and served two months and twelve days.

Companies "B" and "C," 1st Nebraska Militia (mounted) were present at the January, 1865 attack on Camp Rankin and Julesburg and under the command of General Robert B. Mitchell were part of the force which engaged in a fruitless pursuit of the marauding Indian forces after the battle.
