= 1865 Minnesota Secretary of State election =

- November 7, 1865
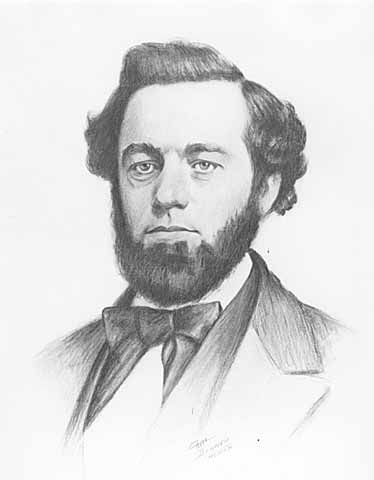

Nominee	Henry C. Rogers	John R. Jones
Party	Republican	Democratic
Popular vote	17,669	13,157
Percentage	57.32%	42.68%
Secretary of State before election
David Blakeley
Republican
Elected Secretary of State
Henry C. Rogers
Republican

The 1865 Minnesota Secretary of State election was held on November 7, 1865, in order to elect the Secretary of State of Minnesota. Republican nominee Henry C. Rogers defeated Democratic nominee John R. Jones.

== General election ==
On election day, November 7, 1865, Republican nominee Henry C. Rogers won the election by a margin of 4,512 votes against his opponent Democratic nominee John R. Jones, thereby retaining Republican control over the office of Secretary of State. Rogers was sworn in as the 4th Minnesota Secretary of State on January 8, 1866.

=== Results ===
Minnesota Secretary of State election, 1865
Party	Candidate	Votes	%
Republican	Henry C. Rogers	17,669	57.32
Democratic	John R. Jones	13,157	42.68
Total votes		30,826	100.00
Republican hold			
