= 6th Iowa Cavalry Regiment =

- Iowa state flag
- Active: January 31, 1863, to October 17, 1865
- Country: United States
- Allegiance: Union
- Branch: Cavalry
- Engagements: Sully's Expedition (1863–1864): Battle of Killdeer Mountain; Battle of the Badlands; Battle of Whitestone Hill

The 6th Iowa Cavalry Regiment was a cavalry regiment that served in the Union Army during the Indian Wars.

== Service ==
The 6th Iowa Cavalry was mustered into Federal service at Davenport, Iowa, for a three-year enlistment between January 31 to March 5, 1863. In 1864, eleven of the regiment's twelve companies were part of Lieutenant Colonel Samuel M. Pollock's 1st Brigade of Brigadier General Alfred Sully's District of Iowa. In this organization, these companies participated in the Northwestern Indian Expedition, fighting at the Battle of Killdeer Mountain and in the Battle of the Badlands. The regiment was mustered out of Federal service on October 17, 1865.

== Total strength and casualties ==
A total of 1420 men served in the 6th Iowa at one time or another during its existence. It suffered 1 officer and 21 enlisted men who were killed in action or who died of their wounds and 1 officer and 74 enlisted men who died of disease, for a total of 97 fatalities.

== Commanders ==
- Colonel David S. Wilson
- Colonel Samuel McLean Pollock

== See also ==
- List of Iowa Civil War Units
- Iowa in the American Civil War
