= 1867 Minnesota Secretary of State election =

- November 5, 1867
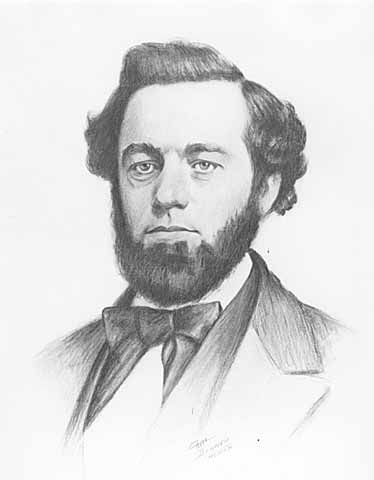

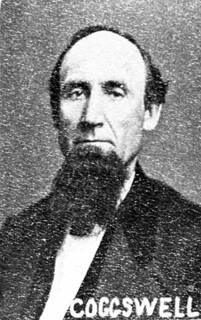
Nominee	Henry C. Rogers	Amos Coggswell
Party	Republican	Democratic
Popular vote	35,154	27,694
Percentage	54.61%	43.02%
Secretary of State before election
Henry C. Rogers
Republican
Elected Secretary of State
Henry C. Rogers
Republican

The 1867 Minnesota Secretary of State election was held on November 5, 1867, in order to elect the Secretary of State of Minnesota. Republican nominee and incumbent Secretary of State Henry C. Rogers defeated Democratic nominee and former Speaker of the Minnesota House of Representatives Amos Coggswell.

== General election ==
On election day, November 5, 1867, Republican nominee Henry C. Rogers won the election by a margin of 7,460 votes against his opponent Democratic nominee Amos Coggswell, thereby retaining Republican control over the office of Secretary of State. Rogers was sworn in for his second term on January 8, 1868.

=== Results ===
Minnesota Secretary of State election, 1867
Party	Candidate	Votes	%
Republican	Henry C. Rogers (incumbent)	35,154	54.61
Democratic	Amos Coggswell	27,694	43.02
Write-in		1,530	2.37
Total votes		64,378	100.00
Republican hold			
