= 7th Iowa Cavalry Regiment =

- Iowa state flag
- Active: April 27, 1863, to June 22, 1866
- Country: United States
- Allegiance: Union
- Branch: Cavalry
- Engagements: Sully's Expedition (1863–1864): Battle of Killdeer Mountain; Battle of the Badlands; Colorado War: Battle of Julesburg; American Indian Wars: Powder River Expedition

The 7th Iowa Cavalry Regiment was a cavalry regiment that served in the Union Army during the Indian Wars.

In Chapter IX of MacKinlay Kantor's Pulitzer Prize-winning novel "Andersonville" (1955), the father of one of the main characters is commissioned as a lieutenant in Company G of the Seventh Iowa Cavalry.

== Service ==
The 7th Iowa Cavalry was mustered into Federal service at Davenport, Iowa, for a three-year enlistment between April 27 to July 13, 1863. On September 19, 1863, it was deployed to Omaha en route to the west. In 1864, three companies of the regiments were part of Lieutenant Colonel Samuel M. Pollock's 1st Brigade of Brigadier General Alfred Sully's District of Iowa. In this organization, these companies participated in the Northwestern Indian Expedition, fighting at the Battle of Killdeer Mountain and in the Battle of the Badlands. Units of the regiment were at Camp Rankin on the South Platte in January, 1865 when more than 1,000 plains Indians attacked the fort and stage station at Julesburg during the Sioux Wars following the Sand Creek Massacre. In the Battle of Julesburg, 14 men of the 7th were killed, including 4 non-commissioned officers. Company F of the regiment accompanied Colonel James H. Kidd's column of the Powder River Expedition in 1865 to the Powder and Tongue river valley's in Dakota Territory and Montana Territory.

The regiment was mustered out of Federal service on June 22, 1866.

== Total strength and casualties ==
A total of 1420 men served in the 7th Iowa at one time or another during its existence. It suffered 1 officer and 21 enlisted men who were killed in action or who died of their wounds and 1 officer and 74 enlisted men who died of disease, for a total of 97 fatalities.

== Commanders ==
- Colonel Samuel W. Summers
- Colonel Herman H. Heath

== See also ==
- List of Iowa Civil War Units
- Iowa in the American Civil War
