= Josias R. King =

First man to volunteer for the Union Army in the U.S. Civil War

Josias Ridgate King
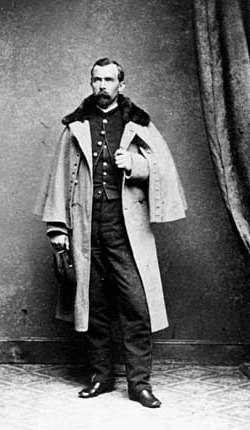
- 1864 portrait of then-Captain Josias R. King
- Born: February 21, 1832; Washington, D.C.
- Died: February 19, 1916 (aged 83); Saint Paul, Ramsey County, Minnesota
- Burial place: Calvary Cemetery Saint Paul, Ramsey County, Minnesota
- Spouse: Mary Louisa King (1842-1928)
- Military career
- Allegiance: United States of America
- Services/branches: St. Paul Pioneer Guards; Minnesota state militia in service of the Union Army; Minnesota National Guard
- Service years: 1861-1870
- Highest rank held in each service: Private (St. Paul Pioneer Guards, 1857-1861); Captain (Minnesota state militia in federal service, 1861-1864); Lieutenant colonel (federal service, 1864-1870); Brigadier general (Minnesota National Guard, 1882-?)
- Known for: Being the first Minnesotan to enlist in the Civil War
- Conflicts: American Civil War; Battle of Gettysburg
- Awards: GAR Medal

Josias Ridgate King (February 21, 1832 – February 19, 1916; aged 83) was an American land surveyor, Union Army officer, and is credited as being the first person to volunteer for the Union during the American Civil War. He spent the majority of his adult life living in Minnesota and would earn the rank of lieutenant colonel during his Civil War service. Post-war, King resumed work as a surveyor and in 1882 was commissioned a brigadier general in the Minnesota National Guard; His reforms of the latter would earn him the nickname "Father of the Minnesota Guard."

== Early life ==
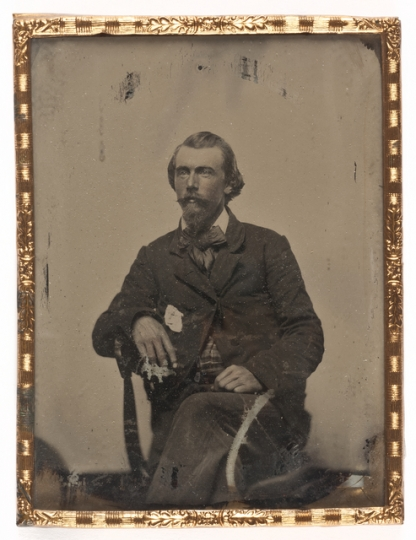
Josias King in 1858

Born in Washington, D.C. in 1832, King was the son of a prominent attorney active in local politics and with influential connections. Little is known of King's early life, other than a Roman Catholic upbringing. Upon the Florida Territory's 1845 admission to the Union, King traveled to the nascent state, his father having secured him an apprenticeship with a United States General Land Office land surveying team. King would remain in Florida until 1849, when he returned to Washington, D.C. to attend Georgetown University. King intended on transferring to the United States Military Academy at West Point, but was instead caught-up in the California gold rush, becoming a "forty-niner," reaching California before the end of 1849. King was "luckier than most" and made a modest living via the gold trade. To assist in sustaining himself, King joined another U.S. survey party, and was deputized in a hunt for an outlaw known only as "Joaquin" (thought to be Mexican outlaw Joaquin Murrieta). In 1857, via his father's influence and connections combined with his own surveying experience, King was appointed "Assistant to the Surveyor-General of Minnesota." King would move to Saint Paul, the capital of Minnesota, and would simultaneously begin his military career. King joined the “St. Paul Pioneer Guards,” an organized, semi-professional frontier militia where he would befriend future railroad magnate James J. Hill. King wed Mary Louisa King (1842-1928) around 1858.

== Civil War ==
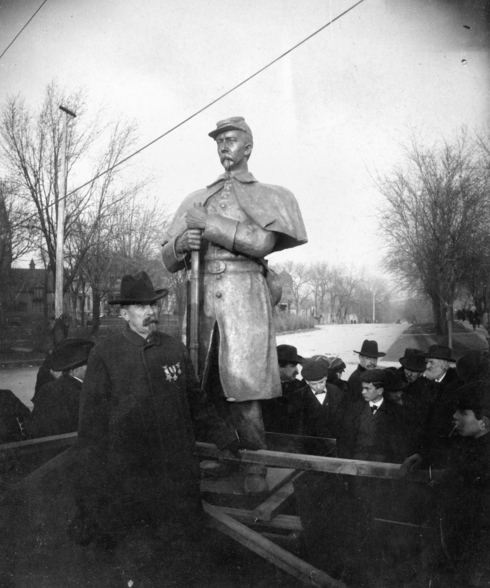
Josias R. King standing next to his statute on November 20, 1903

On April 14, 1861 the Confederate States of America fired on Fort Sumter, triggering the American Civil War. On April 15, 1861 Josias R. King enlisted in the First Minnesota Volunteer Infantry ("First Minnesota"). The First Minnesota is officially recognized as the senior volunteer regiment in the Union Army as Minnesota Governor Alexander Ramsey was the first governor to offer state troops to President Abraham Lincoln to serve the Union. Because of this regimental seniority, King — having allegedly been the first man to volunteer for the First Minnesota — is often considered to be the first man to volunteer for Union service. However, this claim is disputed, though it is also recognized that the claim may be more symbolic than official. King's claim of being the first Minnesotan to volunteer is also disputed (particularly by the claim that Anoka County native and miller Aaron Greenwald was the first Minnesotan to volunteer) though "most experts agree" that King did indeed hold this honor. Elected sergeant of the First Minnesota, King served and fought under then-Captain Alfred Sully. In July 1862, King fought alongside the Army of the Potomac and was promoted to Sully's aide-de-camp (Sully himself having been promoted to colonel in March 1862), King traveled with Sully to Dakota Territory to fight the Dakota natives, he returned to Minnesota temporarily in mid-September 1863. King and the First Minnesota were sent to Pennsylvania and fought in the Battle of Gettysburg, where his courage and leadership as a non-commissioned officer earned him a commission as the first lieutenant of Company A and a month later promoted to captain of Company G. He was mustered-out with the rest of the regiment in early May 1864. On Sully's recommendation, King was federally commissioned a lieutenant colonel of the United States Regular Army (his original commission being granted by the governor of his regiment's home state, as with most U.S. Volunteer and state militia officers) in the short-lived 2nd U.S. Volunteer Infantry (whose enlisted members primarily consisted of Confederate POWs whom volunteered to serve the Union), serving in Kansas. He went on to serve in the 2nd Infantry Regiment (Regular Army) seeing service in both Kentucky and Atlanta, Georgia as part-of post-war security and reconstruction efforts. King would resign his federal commission in 1870 due to his wife's ill health, returning to Saint Paul.

== Post-war life ==
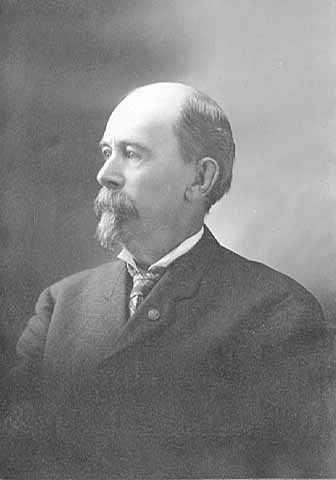
King, aged 66-67, circa 1900

King and his wife returned to Saint Paul where King resumed work as a surveyor, though he would later work at an insurance company. In 1882, while mapping Coddington Lake in Northome, Minnesota, he "accidentally" made the lake 144-acres larger than it actually was; the mistake would eventually preserve the equivalent acreage of woodland and save a 300-year-old tree. In the same year he was appointed as the Inspector General of the Minnesota National Guard with the (state) rank of brigadier general. Under his supervision, the Guard engaged-in significant reforms which led to his title of "Father of the Minnesota Guard." In 1891, he became the administrator of the estate of Jeremiah C. McCarthy and filed a lawsuit against the beneficiaries due to lack of payment, losing the case in 1893. Due to his status and military service the city of St. Paul constructed a large bronze monument in Summit Park near the Cathedral of Saint Paul in 1903. King worked into his 80s, likely due to a small pension and received financial help from his friend and railroad magnate James Hill. A streetcar accident in 1915 left him bedridden and King died of a heart attack at the age of 83 on February 19, 1916. his funeral was held in the St. Paul Cathedral; Archbishop John Ireland delivered King's eulogy and his friend James Hill served as an honorary pallbearer.
