= Alfred Sully =

American military officer (1820 or 1821–1879)

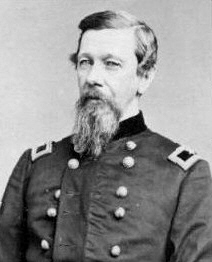
- Brevet Brigadier General Alfred Sully
- Born: May 22, 1820 or 1821; Philadelphia, Pennsylvania, U.S.
- Died: April 27, 1879; Fort Vancouver, Washington Territory, U.S.
- Burial place: Laurel Hill Cemetery, Philadelphia, Pennsylvania, U.S.
- Relatives: Thomas Sully (father); Rosalie Sully (sister); Ella Cara Deloria (great-granddaughter); Vine Deloria, Jr. (great-grandson); Mary Sully (great-granddaughter)
- Military career
- Allegiance: United States
- Branch: United States Army; Union army
- Service years: 1841–1879
- Rank: Colonel, USA; Brigadier General, USV
- Commands: 1st Minnesota Volunteer Infantry; 1st Brigade II Corps; District of Iowa (including Dakota Territory); Superintendent of Indian Affairs for Montana; 21st Infantry Regiment; Fort Vancouver
- Conflicts: American Indian Wars; Second Seminole War; Mexican-American War; Siege of Veracruz; American Indian Wars; Battle of Ash Hollow; American Civil War; Siege of Yorktown; Battle of Seven Pines; Seven Days Battles; Battle of Savage's Station; Battle of White Oak Swamp; Battle of Malvern Hill; Battle of South Mountain; Battle of Antietam; Battle of Fredericksburg; Battle of Chancellorsville; Sully's Expedition (1863–1864); Battle of Whitestone Hill; Battle of Killdeer Mountain; Battle of the Badlands; American Indian Wars; Nez Perce War

Alfred Sully (May 22, 1820 or 1821 – April 27, 1879) was an American military officer who served in the United States Army during the Mexican-American War and the American Indian Wars. He served as Brevet Brigadier General in the Union army during the American Civil War but was removed from command by John Gibbon for failure to suppress a mutiny by the 34th New York Infantry Regiment. He was cleared by a court of inquiry of any wrongdoing and sent to command the District of Iowa (including the Territory of North Dakota) in the Department of the Northwest during the Sioux Wars.

He led Sully's Expedition, a series of punitive expeditions against native Americans in the aftermath of the Dakota War of 1862. After the Civil War, he served as major in the United States Army and continued to fight in the Indian Wars including the Nez Perce War and out of Fort Dodge, Fort Harker and Fort Vancouver. He served as Superintendent of Indian Affairs for Montana in 1869 and as colonel of the 21st Infantry Regiment in 1873.

== Early life and education ==
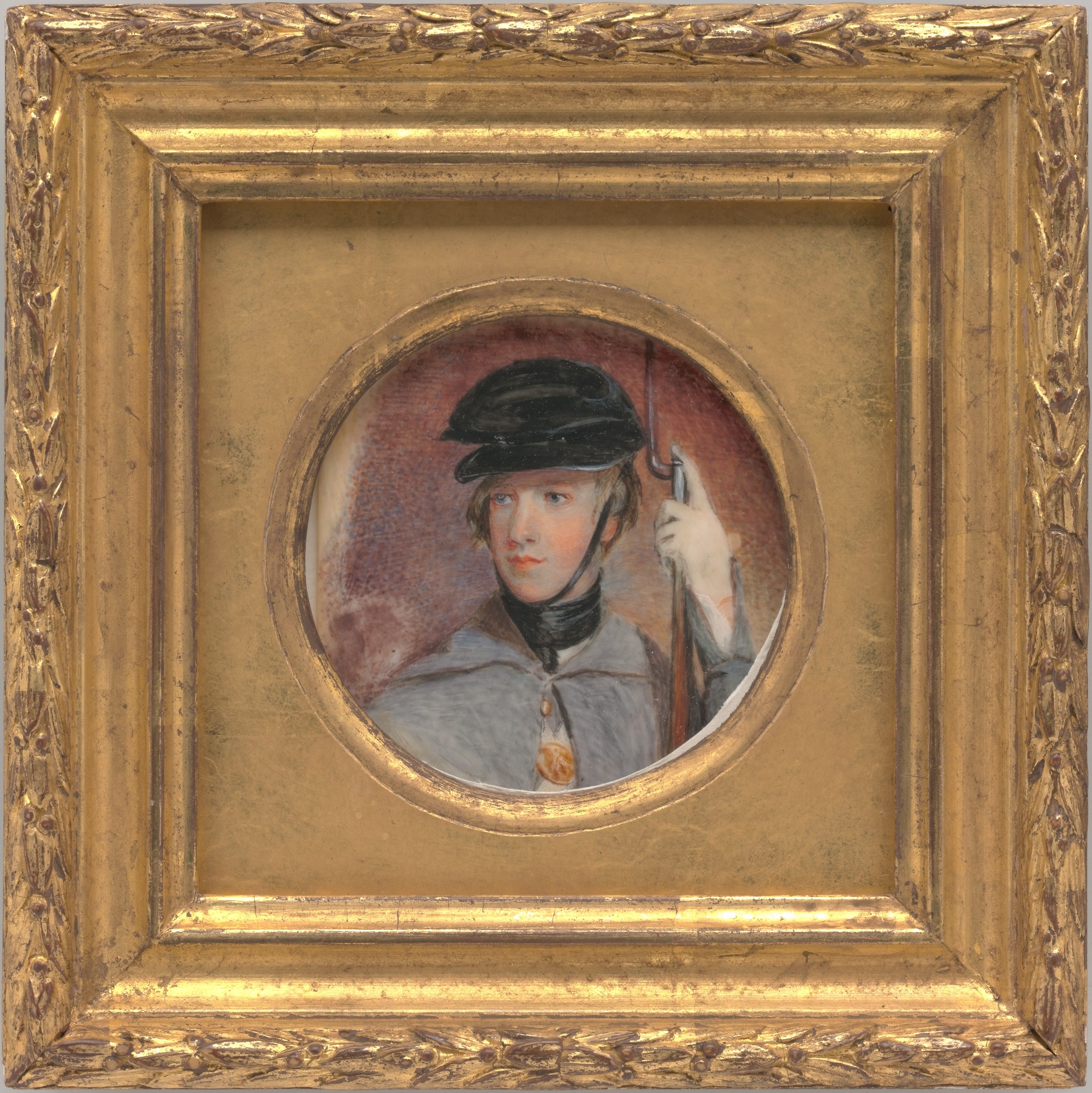
A young Alfred Sully painted c.1839 by his father Thomas Sully while attending West Point Military Academy

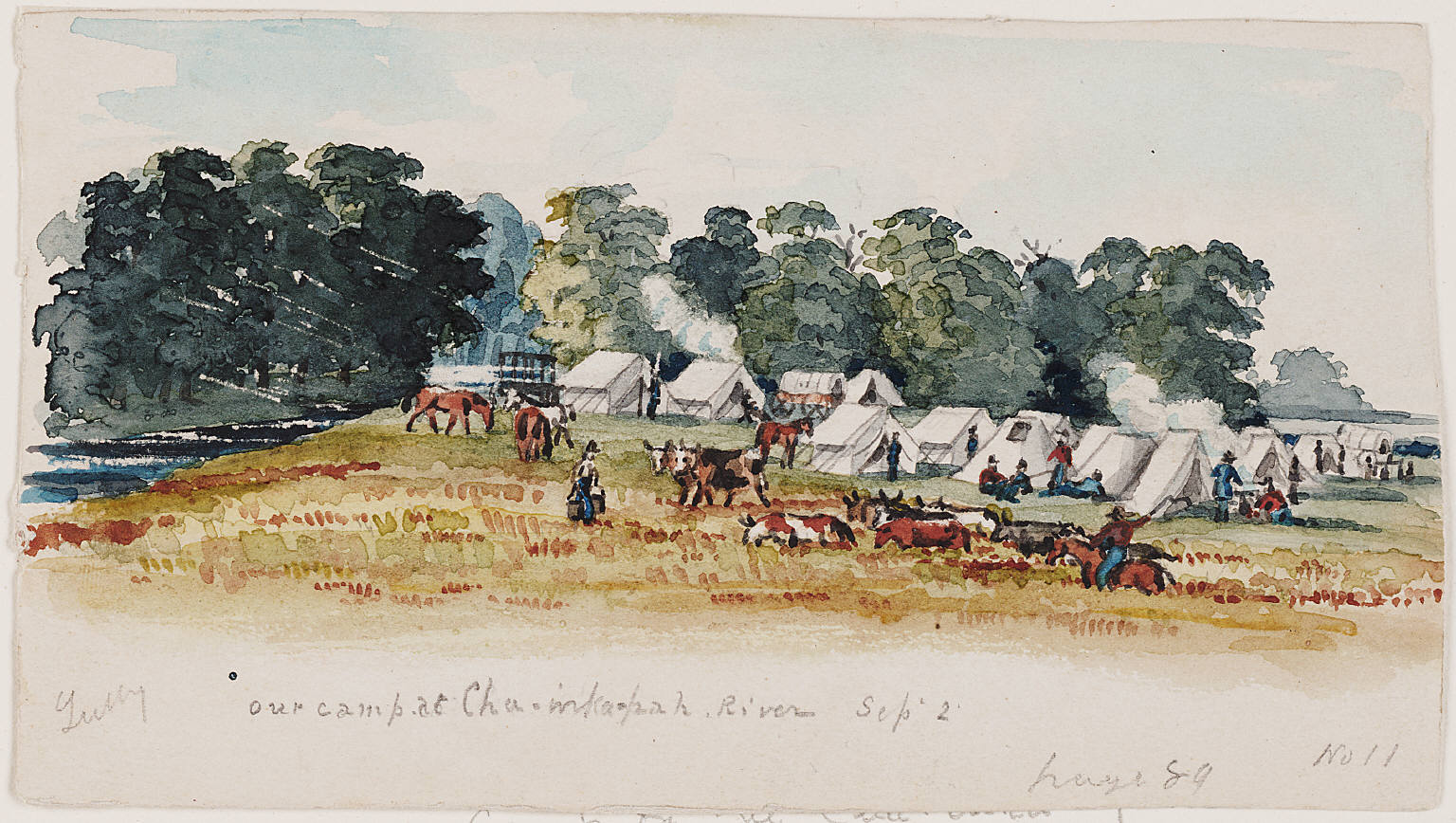
Our Camp at Cha-ink-pah River, watercolor, by Alfred Sully, c. 1856

Sully was born in Philadelphia, Pennsylvania, on May 22, 1820 or 1821. His father was the famous portrait painter, Thomas Sully, and Alfred was an amateur painter who worked in watercolor and oil. By the age of 13, he was making professional sketches of subjects such as the Walnut Street Prison. He entered the United States Military Academy in 1837 and graduated as a second lieutenant in 1841.

== Career ==
Sully fought in the Second Seminole War in Florida in the fall of 1842, and the Mexican-American War in the Siege of Veracruz in 1847. Between 1849 and 1853, after California fell under American jurisdiction, Sully served as chief quartermaster in Monterey, California. He created several oil and watercolor paintings that depicted the social life in Monterey at that time.

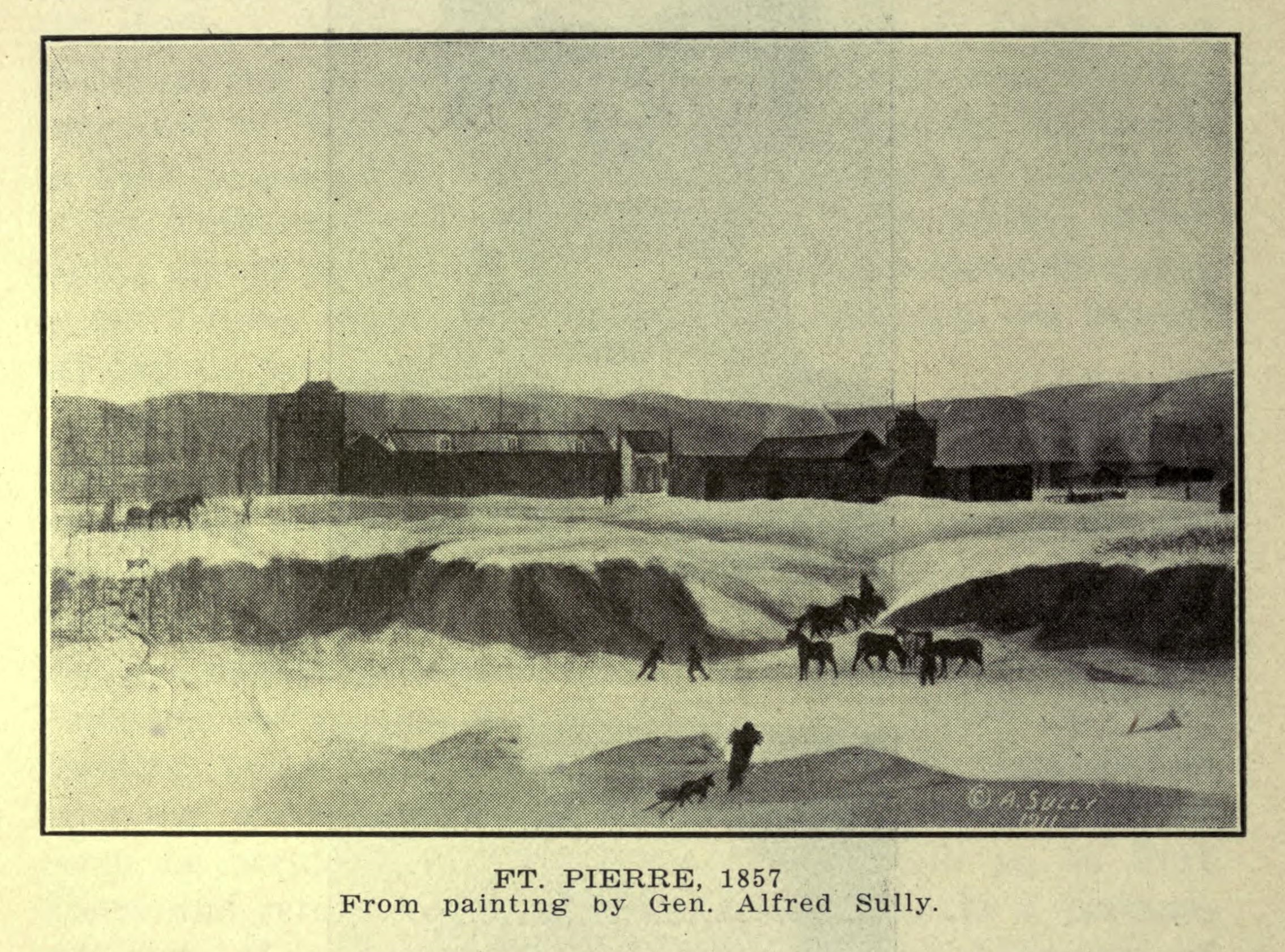
Fort Pierre in 1857 from a painting by Sully

Sully was promoted to captain in 1852 and placed in command of Company F of the Second Regiment at Fort Ridgely and Fort Pierre. He was involved in expeditions against the Rogue River Indians in 1853 and led the construction of Fort Randall. He served under brigadier general William S. Harney and fought in the Battle of Ash Hollow. He left the Dakota Territory in July 1857 and traveled to Europe in 1858 on detached duty to learn from their armies.

Sully led military actions against the Cheyenne from 1860 to 1861 and was promoted to major in 1861.

=== American Civil War ===
At the outbreak of the Civil War, Sully commanded US troops that occupied the city of St. Joseph, Missouri, due to secessionist uprisings through November 1861. He returned East and helped build defenses around Washington, D.C. Sully was promoted to colonel of the 1st Minnesota Infantry Regiment on March 4, 1862.

Sully fought in the Peninsula campaign including at the Siege of Yorktown and the Battle of Seven Pines. He was brevetted lieutenant colonel for his performance at Seven Pines. He led a brigade during the Seven Days Battles including the Battle of Savage's Station, the Battle of White Oak Swamp, and the Battle of Malvern Hill. He fought at the Battle of South Mountain, led a regiment at the Battle of Antietam and was promoted to brigadier general of volunteers in II Corps under John Sedgwick on September 26, 1862. He led a brigade at the Battle of Fredericksburg and during the Battle of Chancellorsville. He was wounded twice - he was grazed by a bullet in the ear during the Battle of Seven Pines and in the leg during the Battle of Fredericksburg.

On May 1, 1863, during the Battle of Chancellorsville, Sully was removed from command by his division commander, brigadier general John Gibbon, after failing to suppress a mutiny by the 34th New York when several of its companies refused to fight on the grounds that their two-year enlistment term was about to expire. A court of inquiry cleared him of any wrongdoing on May 16, 1863, and he was sent West to the Dakota Territory to serve in the Sioux Wars. Sully was not happy with the transfer and considered it an exile.

=== Sully's Expedition ===
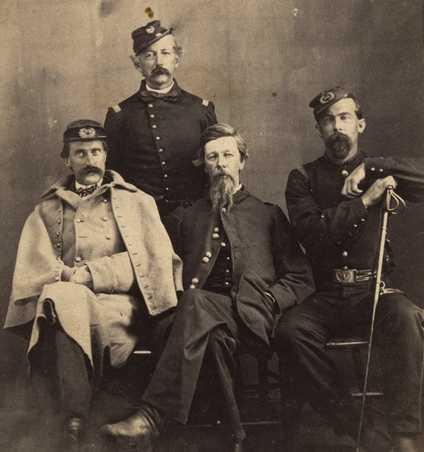
General Alfred Sully (seated at center) with (left to right): John H. Pell, Andrew J. Levering, and Josias R. King, c. 1862.

Sully organized his headquarters at Sioux City, Iowa, and established a base camp at Fort Pierre to stage expeditions against the Sioux. In the spring of 1863, Major General John Pope ordered general Henry Hastings Sibley to march against the Sioux to drive them west toward the Missouri River, and Sully to proceed north to intercept the Sioux before they crossed the river. Sully did not meet up with Sibley due to delays in troop movements caused by low water levels of the Missouri river. He began to return to base on August 1. Pope criticized Sully for the delay which prompted Sully to move his troops out of Fort Pierre on August 13.

On September 3, 1863, at the Battle of Whitestone Hill, Sully's troops demolished a village of approximately 500 tipis of Blackfeet, Dakota, Hunkpapa, Lakota, and Yankton. A scouting party from the 6th Iowa Cavalry Regiment, located the native American village and requested reinforcements from Sully. The Sioux became aware of the U.S. troops and attempted to negotiate a truce but the talks broke down. Many of the Sioux village residents began to flee while others prepared for battle. Sully and reinforcements arrived at sunset. Sully ordered the 2nd Nebraska Cavalry Regiment to cut off the Sioux from escaping to the north and east. Sully ordered the 6th Iowa Cavalry, the 7th Iowa Cavalry Regiment and artillery to drive through the center of the village to capture and kill the Sioux as well as destroy their food supplies. In his report, Sully stated that, "I can safely say that I gave them one of the most severe punishments that the Indians have ever received."

A firsthand account from a U.S. soldier estimates that 300 native Americans were killed and 250 women and children were captured with U.S. Army casualties of 22 killed and 50 wounded. Modern historians estimate between 150 to 200 plus native Americans killed with 156 prisoners taken and U.S. troops suffering 22 dead and 38 wounded.

In response to the killing of his topographical engineer, Captain John Feilner, on June 28, 1864, Sully ordered the severed heads of the native Americans responsible placed on stakes overlooking the Missouri River as a warning.

In July 1864, Sully led the 30th Wisconsin Infantry Regiment to build Fort Rice as a base of operations for expeditions against the Sioux.

A pioneer woman named Fanny Kelly was kidnapped by the Sioux and Sully led troops to re-capture her. On July 19, 1864, Sully left Fort Rice with about 3,000 troops including those from the 1st Dakota Cavalry Battalion, 6th Iowa Cavalry Regiment, 7th Iowa Cavalry Regiment, 2nd Minnesota Cavalry Regiment, and the 8th Minnesota Infantry Regiment, along the Missouri River. The caravan also included emigrants who sought the protection of U.S. troops. On July 23, Sully left the emigrants and approximately 800 troops near the Heart River and continued the expedition. At the Battle of Killdeer Mountain, he led two brigades of soldiers, approximately 2,200 men, and attacked a village of 8,000 native Americans from several tribes including Hunkpapa, Santee, Blackfoot, Yanktonai, Sans Arc, and Minneconjous near a hilltop in the Killdeer Mountains. The Sioux defenders numbered approximately 3,000 and included Sitting Bull, Gall, and Inkpaduta.

Sully organized his troops into a hollow square and advanced on the village, allowing his artillery to dominate and avoiding hand-to-hand combat. The Sioux warriors repeatedly charged the U.S. troops but were repelled by gunfire. The U.S. troops destroyed the village with artillery, took possession of the hilltop, and drove the remaining Sioux into the badlands near the present-day Theodore Roosevelt National Park. In his report, Sully estimated that approximately 150 Sioux were killed and U.S. troops suffered casualties of 5 killed and 10 wounded.

Sully regrouped and led his troops through the badlands in order to reach steamboats on the Yellowstone River for resupply. Sully described the badlands as "Hell with the fires put out." The Battle of the Badlands was fought from August 7 to 9, 1864, when the column of Sully's troops was repeatedly attacked by the Sioux. Sully reported that the U.S. troops suffered 9 deaths and the Sioux suffered 100. The U.S. troops pushed the Sioux into Montana which ended the fighting in the part of the Dakota Territory that became western North Dakota.

Sully was brevetted to major general of volunteers on March 8, 1865, and to brigadier general U.S. Army on March 13, 1865, for his service in the Sioux Wars.

=== Post Civil War ===
With the end of the Civil War, Sully's commission as a brigadier general expired and he reverted to the rank of major in the regular army. He was quickly promoted to lieutenant colonel and placed in charge of the 3rd infantry. From February to September 1867, he served as a member of the Interior Department and visited multiple Sioux tribes along the Platte and Upper Missouri Rivers. He served as a member of the Retiring Board in New York City from September 1867 to March 1868. In 1867, he was scrutinized for his harsh treatment of native Americans by the committee on Indian Affairs led by James R. Doolittle. Sully recommended to the committee that the Bureau of Indian Affairs report into the U.S. Army rather than the Interior Department.

In September 1868, Sully led 500 men out of Fort Dodge and into Indian territory to punish "hostiles" responsible for raids into Kansas. The U.S. troops fought a large group of Cheyenne, Kiowa and Comanche on September 12 but the native Americans used their knowledge of the terrain to their advantage and the U.S. troops became exhausted hauling heavy wagon trains through dense countryside. The troops returned to Fort Dodge unsuccessful and Sully took the blame for the failure.

In November 1868, Sully and George Armstrong Custer led troops into Indian territory. The two disagreed on the military strategy of the expedition and Sully ordered the construction of Fort Supply in what is now Oklahoma. The two leaders continued to fight over who should have command on the expedition. General Philip Sheridan arrived and resolved the dispute by selecting Custer to lead the expedition and sending Sully to Fort Harker.

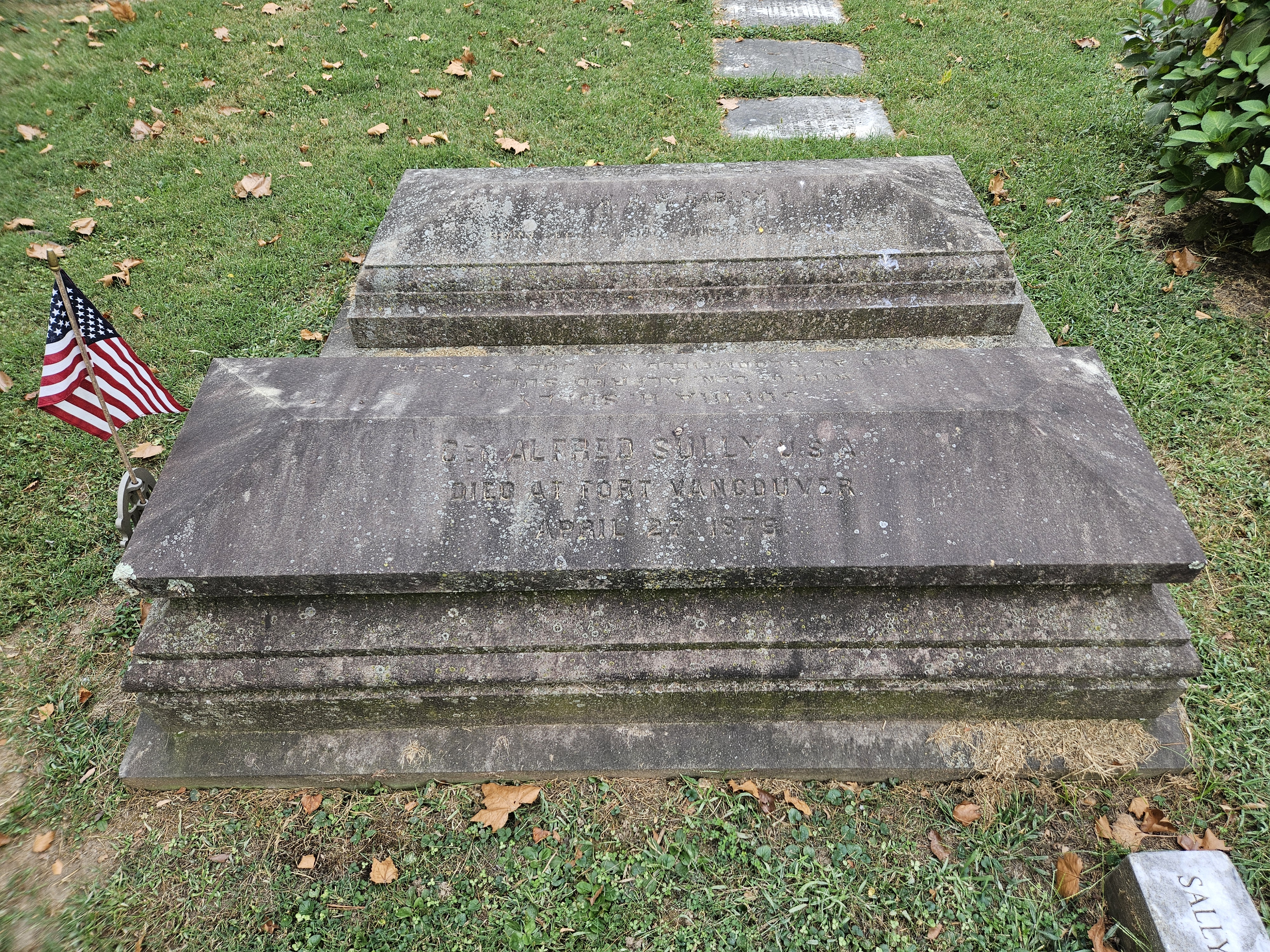
Alfred Sully's tombstone in Laurel Hill Cemetery

Sully served as Superintendent of Indian Affairs for Montana in 1869. On December 10, 1873, he was appointed colonel and commanded the 21st Infantry Regiment in Baton Rouge, Louisiana, from December 1873 to February 1874. He commanded Fort Vancouver from May 1874 to September 1876. He was on a leave of absence from September 1876 to May 1877 and served in the Idaho Territory as part of the Nez Perce War from June to September 1877. He commanded Fort Vancouver again from September 23, 1877, until his death there on April 27, 1879. He was interred in Laurel Hill Cemetery in Philadelphia.

== Personal life ==
During Sully's service as Quartermaster in Monterey, California, he married María Manuela Antonia Jimeno y de la Guerra, the 15-year-old granddaughter of the Californio military officer and ranchero, Jose de la Guerra y Noriega. The family initially objected to the marriage since Sully was Protestant and not wealthy and the couple eloped. The family eventually accepted the marriage and granted Sully a tract of land in California. The couple had a son together, however, soon after childbirth, Manuela died in 1852, possibly from eating poisoned fruit from a rejected suitor, or from cholera. Less than three weeks after the death of his wife, his newborn son, Thomas, was accidentally strangulated.

From September 1856 through May 1857, while serving at Fort Pierre, Sully met and, by Sioux tribal custom, married Pehanlutawinj, a young French-Yankton girl of the Yankton Sioux tribe. Sully and Pehanlutawinj had a daughter named Mary Sully, also known as Akicita Win (Soldier Woman)., who would later become the wife of Philip Deloria, son of Saswe, a.k.a. François Deloria (Saswe being the Dakota pronunciation of François), a powerful Yankton medicine man and chief of the "Half-Breed band".

In 1866, Sully married Sophia Webster, a resident of Richmond, Virginia, and Confederate sympathizer during the Civil War. Together, they had two children.

=== Descendants ===
Alfred Sully and Pehanlutawinj's daughter Mary Sully married Rev. Philip Joseph Deloria, an Episcopal priest, a.k.a. Tipi Sapa (Black Lodge), a leader of the Yankton/Nakota band of the Sioux Nation. Among their descendants are ethnologist Ella Cara Deloria, artist Mary Sully, and Vine Deloria Jr., a scholar, writer, and author of Custer Died for Your Sins.

== Legacy ==
In 1864, Fort Sully was named in his honor. Sully County, South Dakota, the location of Fort Sully, was named after the fort when the county was formed in 1883.

Several of Sully's sketches of the Siege of Veracruz and his description of the battle from a letter were published in a 1914 article in The New York Times.
