= 8th Minnesota Infantry Regiment =

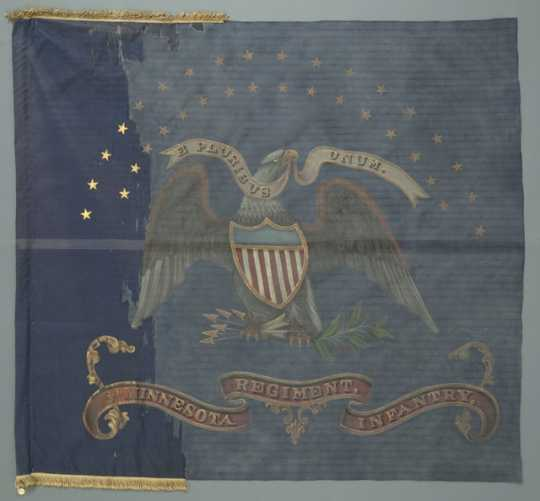
- 8th Minnesota Infantry Regiment Battle Flag
- Active: June 2, 1862, to July 11, 1865
- Country: United States
- Allegiance: Union
- Branch: Infantry
- Nickname: The Indian Regiment Sherman's Woodticks
- Engagements: American Civil War Dakota War of 1862: Sully's Expedition (1863–1864); Battle of Killdeer Mountain; Battle of the Badlands; Franklin–Nashville Campaign; Third Battle of Murfreesboro; Carolinas campaign; Battle of Wyse Fork

Commanders
- Notable commanders: Minor T. Thomas; Henry C. Rogers

The 8th Minnesota Infantry Regiment was a Minnesota USV infantry regiment that served in the Union Army during the American Indian Wars and the American Civil War.

== Service ==
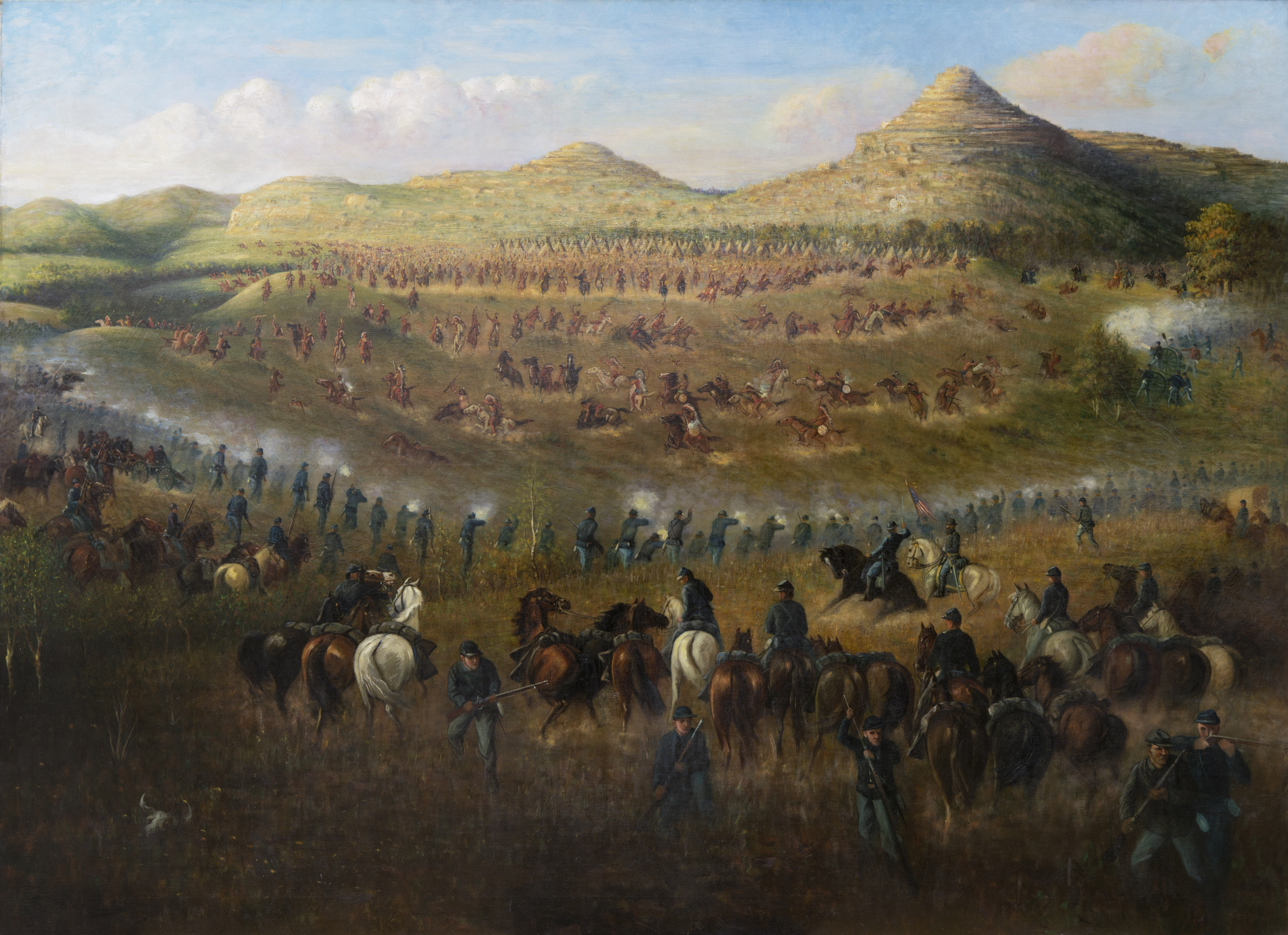
The Eighth Minnesota Infantry at the Battle of Ta-Ha-Kouty (Killdeer Mountain)

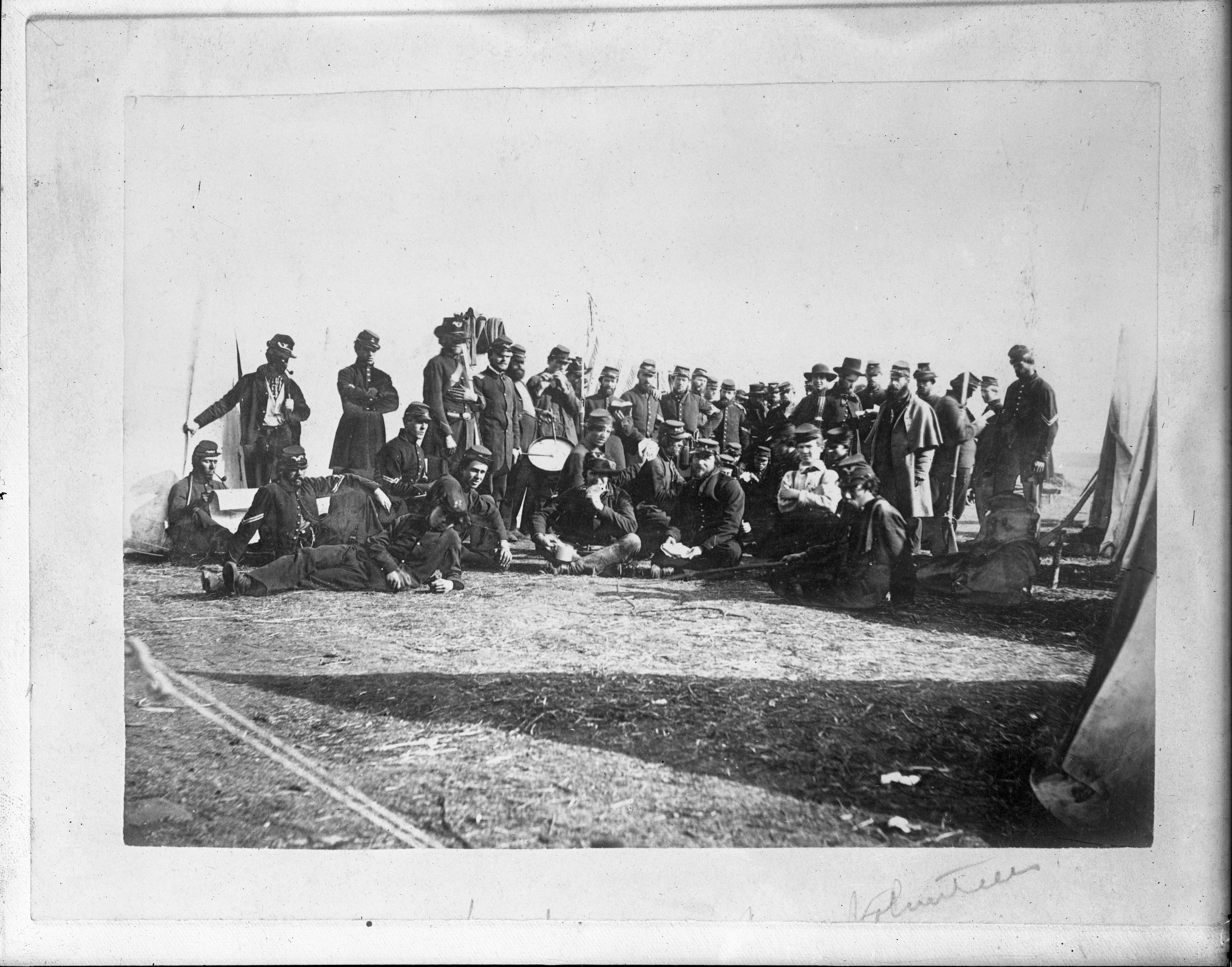
Company of 8th Minnesota Volunteers at Fort Snelling just before departure for the Civil War (1864)

The 8th Minnesota Infantry Regiment was mustered into Federal service at Fort Snelling and St. Paul, Minnesota, between June 2 and September 1, 1862, with ten companies, and deployed in guarding the frontier during the Dakota War of 1862. The regiment served in this manner until the spring of 1864, when it was assembled to participate in Brigadier General Alfred Sully's Northwestern Indian Expedition against the Sioux. The regiment rendezvoused at Paynesville, Minnesota, on May 24, 1864, where it received its regimental colors, was mounted on horses, and attached to the 2nd Brigade of the District of Iowa. The 8th marched through Dakota Territory, where it participated in the Battle of Killdeer Mountain in July, and at the Battle of the Badlands in August. After crossing into eastern Montana Territory, the regiment reached the Yellowstone River, from which point it marched downstream to Fort Union, at the rivers' mouth. From there, the regiment marched toward the Canada–United States border in search of "hostile" Sioux, but returned to Fort Union empty handed. After reaching Fort Rice in central Dakota Territory, from September 10–30, 1864 four companies were sent 200 miles west to help rescue Fisk's immigrant train at Fort Dilts approximately 13 miles east of the Montana Territory border. At this time, the regiment was transferred to the 23rd Corps, then in the Department of the Cumberland at Nashville, Tennessee. The two separated parts of the regiment moved south, but the detachment that had gone to rescue the immigrant train arrived in Nashville first, due to traveling via a steamboat down the Missouri River. In December, 1864 the 8th Minnesota participated in the Third Battle of Murfreesboro, Tennessee, where it suffered 13 men killed and 77 wounded. The regiment then marched to Alabama, moved to Washington, D.C., and landed at Wilmington, North Carolina. After moving inland, from March 7–10, 1865 it fought in the Battle of Wyse Fork, North Carolina. The Regiment was present for General Johnston's surrender to U.S. Gen. Sherman at Bennett Place, Durham, North Carolina. In the last year of the Civil War, the 8th Minnesota saw service in Minnesota, Dakota Territory, Montana Territory, Tennessee, Alabama, Washington, D.C., and North Carolina, traveling more miles during that time than any other regiment of the Union Army. The 8th Minnesota Volunteer Infantry Regiment was finally mustered out on July 11, 1865.

== Casualties ==
The 8th Minnesota Infantry suffered 1 officer and 26 enlisted men who were killed or who died of their wounds received in battle, and another 56 enlisted men who died of disease, for a total of 83 fatalities.

== Commanders ==
- Colonel Minor T. Thomas – August 24, 1862, to July 11, 1865, promoted to brevet brigadier general in February 1865.
- Lieutenant Colonel Henry C. Rogers – Commanded regiment throughout the last year of the war when Colonel Thomas acted as its brigade commander.

== See also ==
List of Minnesota Civil War Units
