= Sioux Wars =

1854–1891 conflicts in the United States

- Part of the American Indian Wars
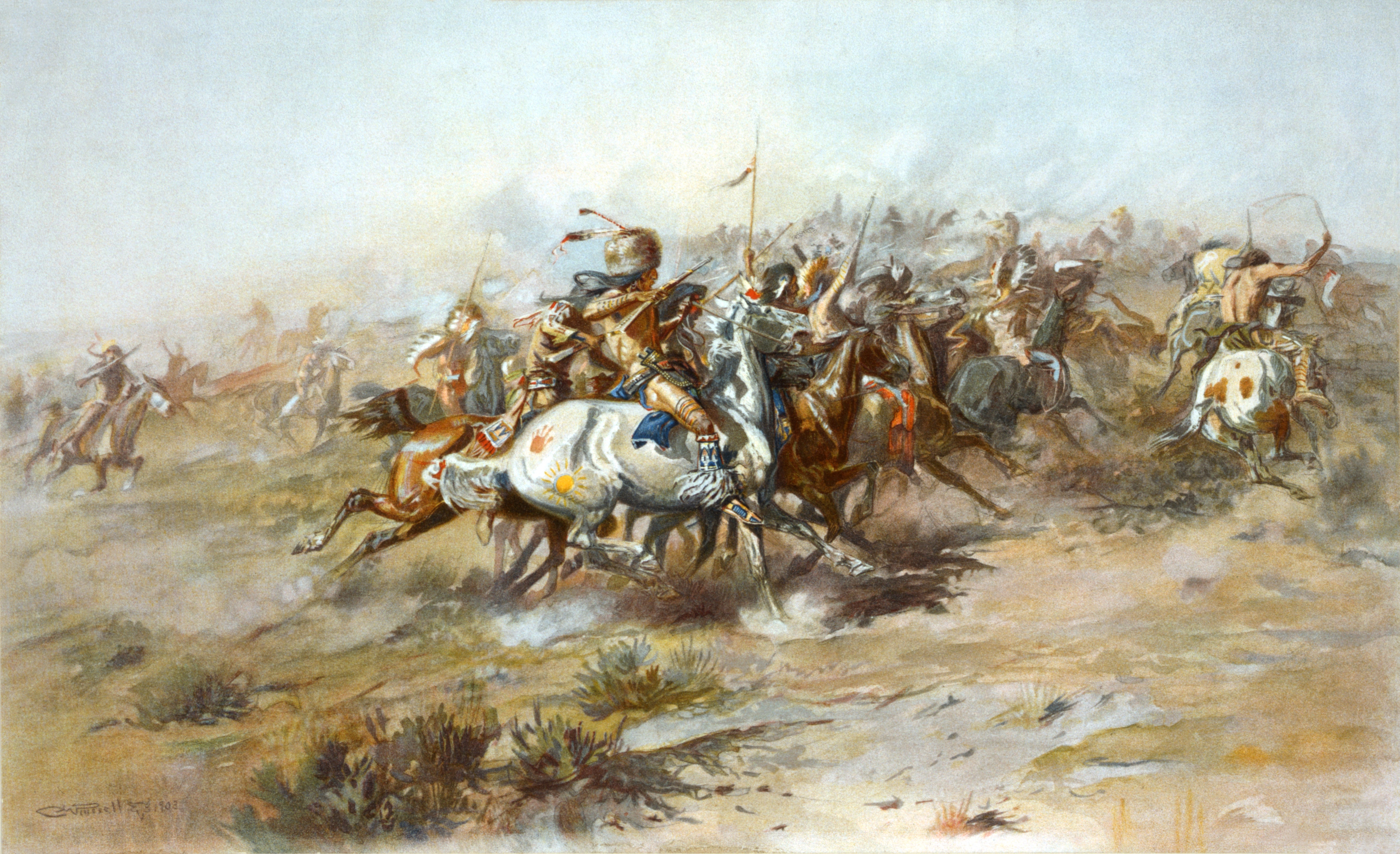
- The Custer Fight; Charles Marion Russell, 1903
Date	1854–1891
Location	Great Plains, United States, partly in 1851 Lakota treaty territory, but mainly in 1851 Crow treaty guaranteed country.
Result	United States victory, Sioux moved to reservations.

Belligerents
United States Allies: Arikara scouts; Crow; Pawnee; Eastern Shoshone	Sioux: Lakota; Dakota; Allies: Cheyenne; Arapaho; Kiowa; Comanche

Commanders and leaders
(United States) John M. Chivington (United States) George Crook (United States) George A. Custer † (United States) Nelson A. Miles (United States) Marcus Reno; Washakie (Shoshone); Plenty Coups (Crow); Alligator-Stands-Up (Crow)	Little Crow; Red Cloud; Crazy Horse †; Sitting Bull; Black Kettle †; Spotted Tail

The Sioux Wars were a series of conflicts between the United States and various subgroups of the Sioux people which occurred in the later half of the 19th century. The earliest conflict came in 1854 when a fight broke out at Fort Laramie in Wyoming, when Sioux warriors killed 31 American soldiers in the Grattan Massacre, and the final came in 1890 during the Ghost Dance War.

== First Sioux War ==
The First Sioux War was fought between 1854 and 1856 following the Grattan Fight. The punitive Battle of Ash Hollow was fought in September 1855.

== Dakota War of 1862 ==
The Santee Sioux or Dakotas of Western Minnesota rebelled on August 17, 1862, after the Federal Government failed to deliver the annuity payments that had been promised to them in the Treaty of Traverse des Sioux of 1851. The tribe pillaged the nearby village of New Ulm and attacked Fort Ridgely. They killed over 800 German farmers, including men, women and children. After the Battle of Birch Coulee on September 2, the Indians were eventually defeated on September 23 in the Battle of Wood Lake.

Most of the warriors who took part in the fighting escaped to the west and north into Dakota Territory to continue the conflict, while the remaining Santees surrendered on September 26 at Camp Release to the US Army. In the following murder trials, 303 Indians were sentenced to death. After closer investigation from Washington, 38 were hanged on December 26 in the town of Mankato in America's largest mass-execution.

In the aftermath, battles continued between Minnesota regiments and combined Lakota and Dakota forces through 1864 as Col. Henry Sibley's troops pursued the Sioux. Sibley's army defeated the Lakota and Dakota in four major battles in 1863: the Battle of Big Mound on July 24, 1863, the Battle of Dead Buffalo Lake on July 26, 1863; the Battle of Stony Lake on July 28, 1863; and the Battle of Whitestone Hill on September 3, 1863. The Sioux retreated further but faced the United States army again in 1864. General Alfred Sully led a force from near Fort Pierre, South Dakota, and decisively defeated the Sioux at the Battle of Killdeer Mountain on July 28, 1864, and at the Battle of the Badlands on August 9, 1864.

The survivors were forced to move to a small reservation on the Missouri River in central South Dakota. There, on the Crow Creek Reservation their descendants still live today.

Map of the west circa 1858 (commissioned by then-Secretary of War Jefferson Davis) showing lands of the Sioux

== Colorado War ==
The Colorado War began in 1863 and was primarily fought by American militia while the United States Army played a minor role. Several Native American tribes attacked American settlements in the Eastern Plains, including the Lakota Sioux who raided in northeast Colorado. On November 29, 1864, Colorado Volunteers under the command of Colonel John Chivington attacked a peaceful Cheyenne and Arapaho village camped on Sand Creek in southeastern Colorado. Under orders to take no prisoners the militia killed an estimated 150 men, women, and children, mutilating the dead and taking scalps and other grisly trophies of battle. The Indians at Sand Creek had been assured by the U.S. Government that they would be safe in the territory they were occupying, but anti-Indian sentiments by white settlers were running high. Later congressional investigations resulted in short-lived U.S. public outcry against the slaughter of the Native Americans.

Following the Sand Creek massacre the survivors joined the camps of the Northern Cheyenne on the Smokey Hill and Republican rivers. There the war pipe was smoked and passed from camp to camp among the Sioux, Cheyenne and Arapaho camped in the area and an attack on the stage station and fort, Camp Rankin at that time, at Julesburg on the South Platte River was planned and carried out in January 1865. This successful attack, the Battle of Julesburg, led by the Sioux, who were most familiar with the territory, was carried out by about a thousand warriors and was followed up by numerous raids along the South Platte both east and west of Julesburg and a second raid on Julesburg in early February. Following the first raid on January 7, 500 troops under the command of General Robert B. Mitchell consisting of the Seventh Iowa Cavalry, the First Nebraska Veteran Volunteer Cavalry, and Companies "B" and "C," First Nebraska Militia (mounted) had been removed from the Platte and were engaged in a fruitless search for hostile Indians on the plains south of the Platte. They found the camp on the Republican River occupied by the tribes only after they had left. A great deal of loot was captured and many whites killed. The bulk of the natives then moved north into Nebraska on their way to the Black Hills and the Powder River but paused to burn the telegraph station on Lodgepole Creek then attacked the station at Mud Springs on the Jules cutoff. There were 9 soldiers stationed there, the telegraph operator and a few other civilians. The Indians began the attack by running the stock off from the station's corral along with a herd of cattle. Alerted by telegraph, the Army dispatched men from Fort Mitchell and Fort Laramie on February 4, about 150 men in all. Arriving on February 5 the first party of reinforcements of 36 men found themselves facing superior forces, estimated to number 500 warriors and with two men wounded were forced to retreat into the station. The second party of 120 troops under the command of Colonel William Collins, commandant of Fort Laramie, arrived on the 6th and found themselves facing 500 to 1,000 warriors. Armed with Spencer repeating rifles the soldiers were able to hold their own and a standoff resulted. After about 4 hours of fighting the war party left and moved their village to the head of Brown's Creek on the north side of the North Platte. Collins' forces were soon reinforced by 50 more men from Fort Laramie who had towed a mountain howitzer with them. With a force of about 185 men Collins followed the trail of the Indians to their abandoned camp at Rock Creek Spring, then followed their plain trail to the south bank of the North Platte at Rush Creek where they encountered a force of approximately 2,000 warriors on the north side of the river. An inconclusive fight followed and the decision was made to abandon pursuit of the war party. In his report Colonel Collins correctly predicted that the party was en route to the Power River Country and would continue to raid along the North Platte. His estimate of Indian casualties during the two engagements was 100 to 150, many more than reported by George Bent a participant in the war party.

In the spring of 1865, raids continued along the Oregon trail in Nebraska. January 27, 1865, while a brisk northwest wind was blowing the army fired the prairie from Fort McPherson to Denver. The Sioux, the Northern Cheyenne, the Northern Arapaho together with the warriors who had come north after the Sand Creek massacre raided the Oregon Trail along the North Platte River, and in July 1865 attacked the troops stationed at the bridge across the North Platte at the present site of Casper, Wyoming, the Battle of the Platte Bridge Station.

== Powder River War ==
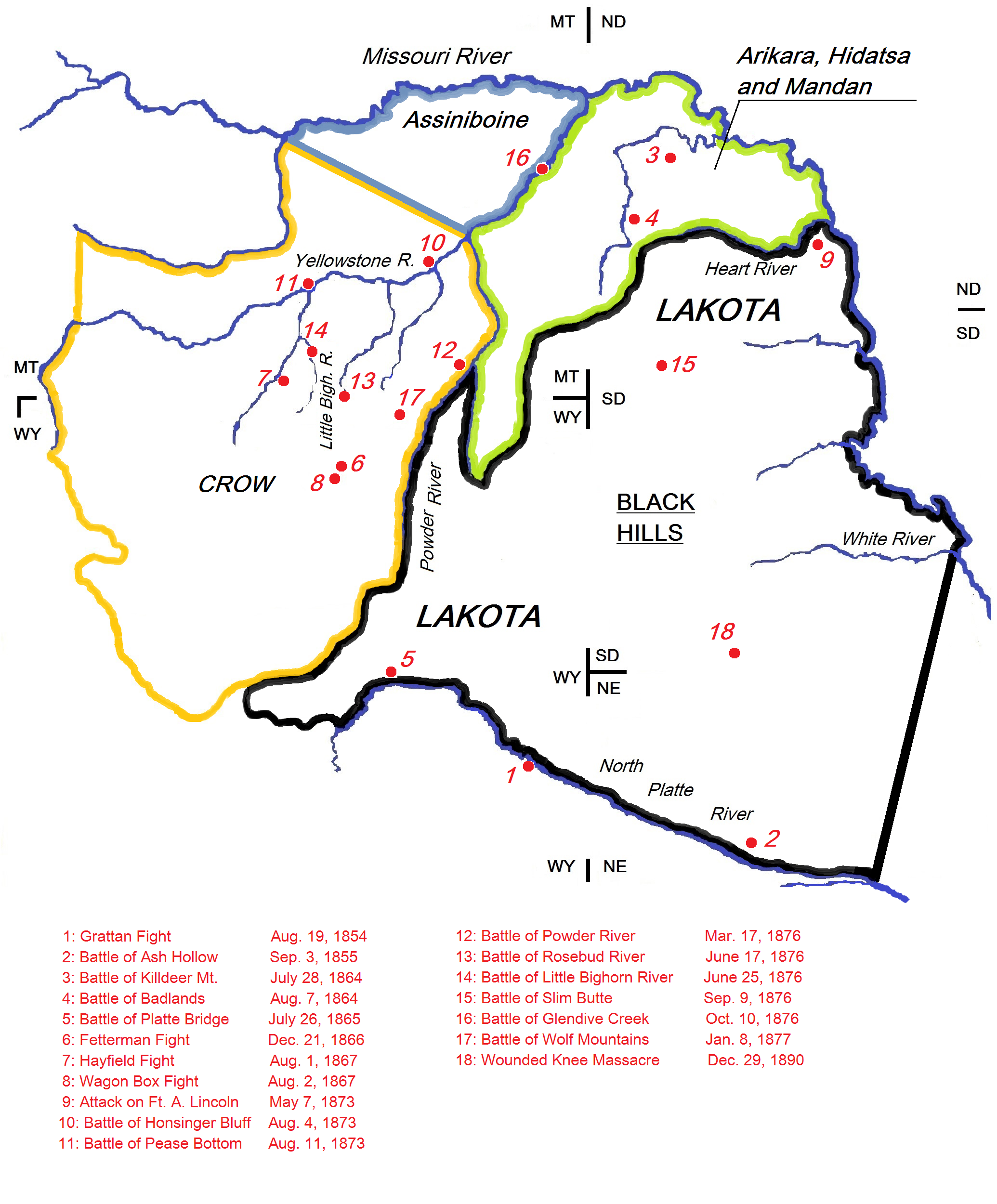
Map indicating the battlefields of the Lakota wars (1851–1890) and the Lakota Indian territory as described in the Treaty of Fort Laramie (1851). Most battles "between the army and the Dakota [Lakota] were on lands those Indians had taken from other tribes since 1851", and the ongoing conflict between the United States and the buffalo seeking Lakotas in the 1860s and the 1870s was a "clash of two expanding empires". The steady Lakota invasion into treaty areas belonging to smaller tribes ensured the United States firm Indian allies in the Arikaras and the Crows during the Lakota Wars.

In 1865 Major General Grenville M. Dodge ordered a punitive expedition against the Sioux, Cheyenne and Arapaho tribes that lived in the Black Hills region. General Patrick E. Connor was placed in command with hundreds of regular and volunteer soldiers at his disposal. Connor divided his force into three columns, the first was under Colonel Nelson Cole and was assigned to operate along the Loup River of Nebraska. The second column, under Lt Col Samuel Walker, would travel north from Fort Laramie to occupy an area west of the Black Hills while the third, led by General Connor and Colonel James H. Kidd, would march up the Powder River. Only minor skirmishing occurred until August 29, 1865, when Connor's column of about 400 men encountered about 500 Arapahos of Chief Black Bear in the Battle of the Tongue River. That morning Connor's men charged and captured a village and routed the defenders who counterattacked unsuccessfully. A few days later a small party of soldiers and civilian surveyors was attacked by the Arapaho in what became known as the Sawyers Fight, three Americans were killed and it marked the last skirmish of the Powder River War.

== Red Cloud's War ==
Due to increasing demand of safe travel along the Bozeman Trail to the Montana gold fields, the US government tried to negotiate new treaties with the Lakota Indians who were legally entitled to the Powder River country, through which the trail led, by the Treaty of Fort Laramie. Because the military sent simultaneously two battalions of the 18th Infantry under the command of Colonel Henry B. Carrington to establish new forts to watch over the Bozeman Road, the Indians refused to sign any treaty and left Fort Laramie determined to defend their land.

Carrington reinforced Fort Reno and established two additional forts further north (Fort Phil Kearny and Fort C. F. Smith) in the summer of 1866. His strategy, based on his orders from higher headquarters, was to secure the road, rather than fight the Indians. At the same time Red Cloud and the other chiefs soon became aware that they were unable to defeat a fully defended fort, so they kept to raiding every wagon train and traveling party they could find along the road.

Young eager warriors from the Lakota, Cheyenne and Arapaho tribes formed war parties who would attack woodcutting parties near the forts as well as freight trains to cut their supplies. Crazy Horse from the Oglala, Gall from the Hunkpapas and Hump from the Miniconjous were the best known ones among them. On December 21, 1866, Indians fired on woodcutters working near Fort Phil Kearny. The relief party was commanded by Captain William J. Fetterman. Fetterman's party was drawn into an ambush by an estimated 1,000–3,000 Indians and wiped out. Due to the high casualties on the American side, the Indians called the fight the "Battle of the Hundred Slain" ever since; among the Whites, it was called the "Fetterman Massacre".

The US government came to the conclusion after the Fetterman Fight that the forts along the Bozeman Trail were expensive to maintain (both in terms of supplies and manpower) and did not bring the intended security for travelers along the Road. However Red Cloud refused to attend any meeting with treaty commissions during 1867. Only after the army evacuated the forts in the Powder River country and the Indians burned down all three of them, did he travel to Fort Laramie in the summer of 1868, where the Treaty of Fort Laramie (1868) was signed. It established the Great Sioux Reservation which included all South Dakota territory west of the Missouri river. It also declared additional territory reaching as far as the Yellowstone and North Platte rivers as unceded territory for sole use by the Indians.

== The early 1870s fights ==
On May 7, 1868, the Crow tribe ceded land to the United States, including areas along the Yellowstone, Montana. The army came under attack by Lakotas in 1872, while it protected surveying expeditions for the Northern Pacific Railway down the river. The next year, the Lakotas carried out attacks on the U.S. army in the five years old U.S. territory at Honsinger Bluff and Pease Bottom. Further east, soldiers and Arikara scouts from Fort McKean at the Missouri had to fight attacking Lakotas on August 26, 1872. Nearly 300 Lakotas attacked the fort on October 14. Around 100 Lakotas attacked close by Fort Abraham Lincoln on May 7, 1873. Both forts were located in former Lakota territory, which the tribe had ceded to the United States at the same time as the establishment of the Great Sioux Reservation in 1868.

Especially after the Lakota massacre on the Pawnee Indians in the south-western Nebraska on August 5, 1873, the Commissioner of Indian Affairs advocated a firmer line against all Lakotas harassing people, both Indians and whites, outside the recognized 1868 Lakota domain. "In his 1873 annual report he recommended ... that those [Sioux] Indians roaming west of the Dakota line be forced by the military to come in to the Great Sioux Reservation". "The Great Sioux War" could have started in 1873, but nothing came about.

== Great Sioux War ==
The Great Sioux War refers to a series of conflicts from 1876 to 1877 involving the Lakota Sioux and Northern Cheyenne tribes. Following the influx of gold miners to the Black Hills of South Dakota, war broke out when the followers of Chiefs Sitting Bull and Crazy Horse left their reservations, apparently to go on the war path and defend the sacred Black Hills.

In the first major fight of the war, on March 17, 1876, about 300 men under Colonel Joseph J. Reynolds attacked 225 Northern Cheyenne and a few Oglala Sioux warriors in the Battle of Powder River, which ended with a Native American victory. During the fighting, the Cheyenne were forced to retreat with their families further up the Powder River, leaving behind large quantities of weapons and ammunition. Next came the major Battle of the Rosebud on June 17, when 1,500 Lakota Sioux and Northern Cheyenne warriors, led by Crazy Horse himself, defeated a force of 1,300 Americans under General George Crook. Crook was forced to retreat, which helped set the stage for the infamous Battle of the Little Bighorn on June 25. Lieutenant Colonel George Custer, leading an attack on a large Indian encampment and commanding a force of over 600 troops, was badly defeated with the loss of over 300 men killed or wounded, including himself.

The next major engagement occurred at Slim Buttes on September 9 and 10, when elements of the 1st Cavalry Regiment led by Captain Anson Mills, while moving toward Deadwood to secure supplies for Crook's command, located and attacked a Sioux village. The Dull Knife Fight, on November 25, and the Battle of Wolf Mountain on January 8, 1877, were the last major fights in the conflict. During the latter, Nelson A. Miles defended a ridge from a series of failed attacks led by Crazy Horse, who ultimately surrendered at Camp Robinson in May 1877, thus ending the war.

== Ghost Dance War ==
From November 1890 to January 1891, unresolved grievances led to the last major conflict with the Sioux. A lopsided engagement that involved almost half the infantry and cavalry of the Regular Army caused the surviving warriors to lay down their arms and retreat to their reservations.

That autumn, the Sioux were moved to a large reservation in the Dakota Territory, but the government pressured them to sign a treaty giving up much of their land. Sitting Bull had previously returned from Canada and held the Sioux resistance together for a few years. But in the summer of 1889, the reservation agent, James McLaughlin, was able to secure the Sioux's signatures by keeping the final treaty council a secret from Sitting Bull. The treaty broke up their 35,000 acres (142 km^{2}) into six small reservations.

In October 1890, Kicking Bear and Short Bull brought the Sioux one last hope of resistance. They taught them the Ghost Dance, something they had learned from Wovoka, a Paiute medicine man. He told them that in the spring, the earth would be covered with a new layer of soil that would bury the white men while the Native Americans who did the Ghost Dance would be suspended in the air. The grass and the buffalo would return, along with the ghosts of their dead ancestors. The Ghost Dance movement spread across western reservations. The U.S. government considered it a threat and sent out its military.

On the Sioux reservations, McLaughlin had Kicking Bear arrested, while Sitting Bull's arrest on December 15, 1890, resulted in a struggle between reservation police and Ghost Dancers in which Sitting Bull was killed. Two weeks later, the military intercepted Big Foot's band of Ghost Dancers. They were Miniconjou Sioux, mostly women who had lost husbands and other male relatives in the wars with the U.S. military. When Colonel James W. Forsyth tried to disarm the last Miniconjou of his rifle, a shot broke out, and the surrounding soldiers opened fire. Hotchkiss guns shredded the camp on Wounded Knee Creek, killing, according to one estimate, 300 of 350 men, women, and children.

=== Stranded 9th Cavalry ===
The battalion of 9th Cavalry Regiment was scouting near the White River (Missouri River tributary), about 50 miles north of Indian agency at Pine Ridge, when the Wounded Knee Massacre occurred, and rode south all night to reach the reservation. In the early morning of December 30, 1890, F, I, and K Troops reached the Pine Ridge agency, however, their supply wagon guarded by D Troop located behind them was attacked by 50 Sioux warriors near Cheyenne Creek (about 2 miles from the Indian agency). One soldier was immediately killed. The wagon train protected itself by circling the wagons. Corporal William Wilson volunteered to take a message to the agency at Pine Ridge to get help after the Indian scouts refused to go. Wilson took off through the wagon circle with Sioux in pursuit and his troops covering him. Wilson reached the agency and spread the alarm. The 9th Cavalry within the agency came to rescue the stranded troopers and the Sioux dispersed. For his actions, Corporal Wilson received the Medal of Honor.

=== Drexel Mission Fight ===
The Drexel Mission Fight followed later in the day.

=== Winter guards ===
The 9th Cavalry were stationed on the Pine Ridge reservation through the rest of the winter of 1890–1891 until March 1891, lodging in their tents. By then, the 9th Cavalry was the only regiment on the reservation after being the first to arrive in November 1890.

== See also ==
- Apache Wars
- Merritt H. Day

== Bibliography ==
- Lavender, David. The Rockies. Revised Edition. N.Y.: Harper & Row, 1975.
- Limerick, Patricia Nelson. The Legacy of Conquest: The Unbroken Past of the American West. N.Y.: W.W. Norton, 1987.
- Smith, Duane A. Rocky Mountain West: Colorado, Wyoming, & Montana, 1859–1915. Albuquerque: University of New Mexico Press, 1992.
- Williams, Albert N. Rocky Mountain Country. N.Y.: Duell, Sloan & Pearce, 1950.
