= Battle of Killdeer Mountain =

Battle of the American Indian Wars

Coordinates: 47.4252°N 102.9184°W

- Part of Sully's Expedition (1863–1864), Sioux Wars, American Civil War
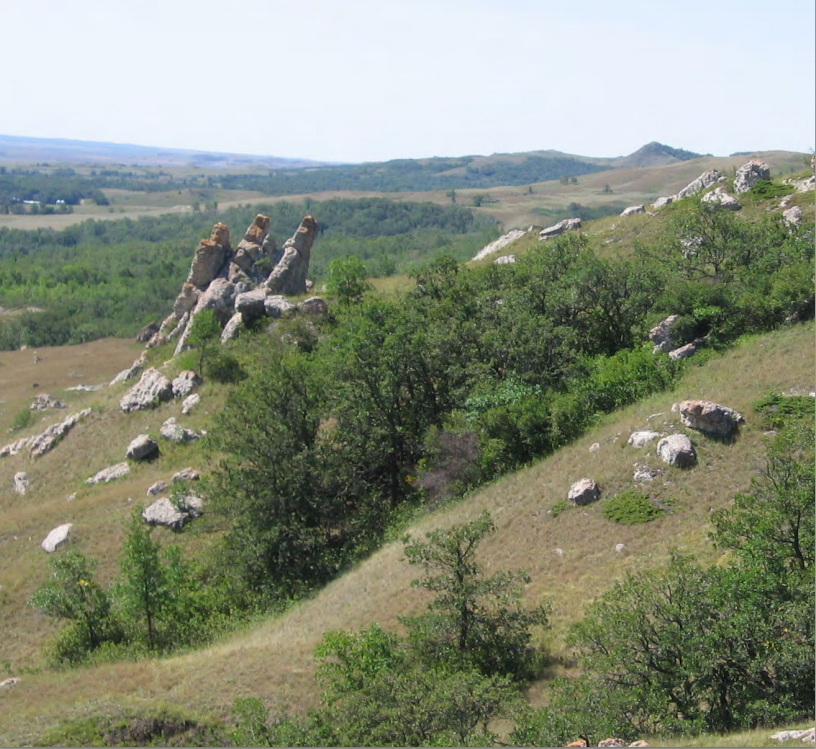
- Killdeer Mountain battlefield
Date	July 28–29, 1864
Location	Dakota Territory; Present-day Dunn County, North Dakota
Result	United States victory

Belligerents
United States of America	Lakota, Yanktonai, Santee Dakota

Commanders and leaders
Alfred Sully	Gall; Sitting Bull; Inkpaduta

Strength
2,200	1,600 or more

Casualties and losses
5 dead, 10 wounded.	31 dead possibly more

The Battle of Killdeer Mountain (also known as the Battle of Tahkahokuty Mountain) took place during Brig. Gen. Alfred Sully's expedition against the Sioux in Dakota Territory July 28–29, 1864. The location of the battleground is in modern Dunn County, North Dakota. With a total of more than 4,000 soldiers involved in the total operation, and more than 2,000 in the battle, Sully's expedition was the largest ever carried out by the U.S. army against Native Americans.

== Background ==
In the aftermath of the Dakota War of 1862, the U.S. government punished the Sioux, including those who had not participated in the war. Large military expeditions into Dakota Territory in 1863 pushed most of the Sioux to the western side of the Missouri River at least temporarily and made safer, although not entirely safe, the frontier of white settlement in Minnesota and the Dakotas. Four whites were killed by Sioux raiders in the spring of 1864.

An important impetus to another military campaign against the Sioux was the desire to protect lines of communication with recently discovered goldfields in Montana and Idaho. The lifeline for the American gold miners were steamboats plying the Missouri River through the heart of Sioux territory. During the winter of 1863–1864, Sully's superior, Major General John Pope ordered Sully to establish several forts along the Missouri River and in the eastern Dakotas to secure the communication routes to the goldfields and to eliminate the Sioux threat to the settlers east of the Missouri River.

Sully's First Brigade, consisting of up to 1,700 men, followed the Missouri River from its starting point at Sioux City, Iowa. The Second Brigade with about 1,550 men would march overland from Fort Ridgely in Minnesota. On the march up the Missouri, the Sioux killed one soldier and wounded another. The three Sioux perpetrators were caught, killed, and decapitated. Additional soldiers and civilians with 15 steamboats chugged up the Missouri River to support the army on the ground.

Sully's two columns of soldiers united on June 29 and on July 7 he established Fort Rice on the Missouri River in North Dakota as a base, supplied by steamboat, for his military expedition. His scouts, Winnebago and friendly Sioux and mixed-bloods, informed him of a large encampment of Sioux 130 miles northwest near the Little Missouri River. On July 19, he and his men departed Fort Rice to search for the Sioux encampment. Sully was encumbered by a wagon train of 200 miners and their families headed for the goldfields whom he reluctantly agreed to protect and escort.

Sully's scouts reported 1,500 to 1,800 tipis in the Sioux encampment. Sully believed he would be faced by 5,000 to 6,000 warriors. The Sioux later claimed they had 1,600 warriors in the battle – likely closer to the truth with a calculation of one to two adult males per tipi. The Sioux in the encampment consisted mostly of Lakota (Teton) from the Hunkpapa, Sihasapa, Miniconjou, and Sans Arc bands plus Yanktonais, and a few Santees. The Sioux were mostly armed only with bows and arrows and a few short-range muskets and shotguns. Many of the Sioux, especially the Tetons, had not been hostile to the U.S. before this encounter.

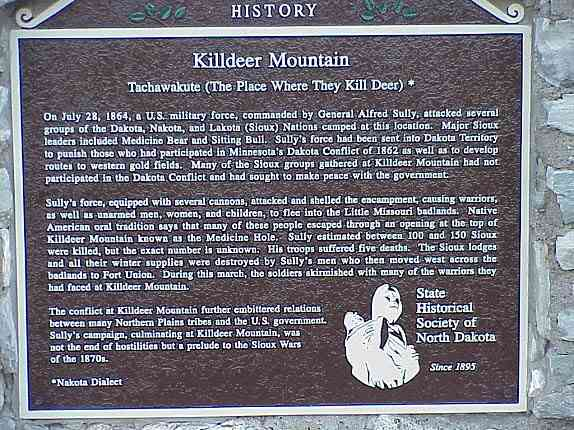
Killdeer battle marker, 2003

Sully, after leaving men at Fort Rice and to guard the emigrants, had 2,200 men for the attack. He also had two artillery batteries with eight howitzers. On July 26, Sully's Indian Scouts skirmished with 30 Sioux warriors near present-day Richardton, North Dakota and one scout was wounded. With the Sioux now aware of his presence, Sully advanced rapidly but carefully. On the morning of July 28, scout Frank LaFramboise, a mixed-blood Santee, informed Sully of the location of the large Sioux encampment 10 miles ahead.

Killdeer Mountain was at the edge of the Dakota badlands, cut up by "deep, impassable ravines" and "high rugged hills." Realizing that a cavalry charge would be difficult in the broken terrain Sully dismounted his soldiers and formed them in a hollow square, one mile and a quarter (2 km.) per side. His horses and artillery were sheltered inside the square. He advanced on foot, as the Sioux on horseback formed up in groups on Sully's flanks and on hilltops.

== Battle ==
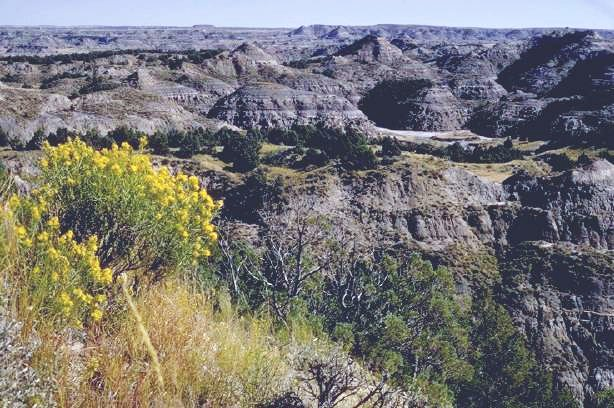
After the battle, Sully pursued the Sioux through the difficult terrain of the Badlands of North Dakota near present-day Theodore Roosevelt National Park.

The two sides, Sully's soldiers drawn up in a hollow square and Native forces scattered around the hills, exchanged insults at long distance. One warrior, a Hunkpapa named Lone Dog rode within rifle range of the soldiers, taunting them. Sully ordered him shot by sharpshooters. Accounts differ as to whether Lone Dog was killed or unscathed.

With the first shots fired at Lone Dog, the soldiers advanced with a skirmish line and the Sioux darted at the flanks of the army, seeking weak spots. Artillery fire discouraged the Sioux from congregating in large numbers. A thrust at Sully's rear was broken up by an artillery shell that felled several of the warriors. Sully's square of soldiers advanced steadily. The Sioux quickly realized that they could not hope to turn the soldiers back and they shifted their focus to packing up their tipis and equipment and protecting the flight of their women and children.

Attempting to halt Sully's advance, the Sioux mounted charges on his right and left flanks, the Yanktonai and Santee attacking on the right and the Teton on his left. Major Alfred B. Brackett and his Minnesota Battalion on the right mounted their horses and launched a counter-charge, supported by artillery. He scattered the Native forces after close quarters fighting with sabers and pistols. A renowned hero of the frontier and the Civil War, Lt. George Northrup, was killed in the charge.

It was getting dark as Sully neared the Sioux village. He halted his men for the night, but continued his artillery bombardment of the Sioux and their village. The Sioux fled or fought delaying actions, abandoning most of their tipis and property.

Sully's casualties for the day were 3 killed and 10 wounded. He estimated Sioux casualties of 100 to 150 dead, nearly all of them warriors. The Sioux claimed they suffered 31 dead.

== Aftermath ==
The day after the battle, the Sioux having abandoned their encampment, Sully detailed 700 men to destroy all they had left behind. This included tipis, large supplies of dried buffalo meat (jerky), and up to 3,000 dogs which were shot. A few Sioux, including children, left behind in the camp were killed by the Winnebago scouts.

Most of the Sioux scattered through the Dakota Badlands to the west of Killdeer Mountain, but some remained near Sully. Several Sioux on a hilltop waved a white flag requesting talks but they were fired on by soldiers and fled. That night two of Sully's picket guards were killed and one wounded by a Sioux war party. Another soldier was killed by guards when he was mistaken for an enemy.

Although running short of rations, Sully decided to continue his pursuit of the Sioux. A Blackfoot scout said he knew a route through the Badlands passable by Sully's wagon train. After two days rest, Sully and his men plunged into the unknown terrain ahead. The Sioux would harass their passage in the Battle of the Badlands.

== Opposing Forces ==
=== United States ===
Department of the Northwest: MG John Pope (not present in the field)

Division	Brigade	Regiments and Others
District of Iowa BG Alfred Sully	1st Brigade Ltc Samuel M. Pollock	6th Iowa Cavalry, 11 companies: Ltc Samuel M. Pollock; 7th Iowa Cavalry, 3 companies: Ltc John Pattee; Brackett's Minnesota Cavalry Battalion, 4 companies: Maj Alfred B. Brackett; 1st Dakota Cavalry Battalion, 2 companies: Cpt Nelson Miner; Independent Nebraska Company of Indian Scouts: Cpt Christian Stufft; Prairie Battery: Cpt Nathaniel Pope
District of Iowa BG Alfred Sully	2nd Brigade Col Minor T. Thomas	8th Minnesota Infantry, 10 companies: Col Minor T. Thomas, Ltc Henry C. Rogers; 2nd Minnesota Cavalry, 6 companies: Col Robert N. McLaren; 3rd Minnesota Battery: Cpt John Jones

=== Native Americans ===
- Lakota (Teton), and Dakota (Yanktonai, Santee) Sioux: Gall, Sitting Bull, Inkpaduta

== Killdeer Mountain Battlefield State Historic Site ==
Killdeer Mountain Battlefield State Historic Site marks part of the battlefield site and is protected by the State Historical Society of North Dakota. This features a sandstone slab monument, flagpole, and two headstones that honor soldiers killed in the conflict, Sergeant George Northrup, Company C, and Private Horace Austin, Company D, Brackett's Battalion, Minnesota Cavalry. The site is located 8.5 miles northwest of Killdeer, North Dakota.

== See also ==
- History of North Dakota
- Plains Indians Wars
- List of battles fought in North Dakota
