= Battle of the Badlands =

Battle of the American Civil War

Coordinates: 46.8718°N 103.678277°W

- Part of the Sioux Wars and the Trans-Mississippi Theater of the American Civil War
Date	7–9 August 1864
Location	Badlands, Dakota Territory (near present-day Medora, North Dakota)
Result	United States victory

Belligerents
United States of America	Hunkpapa; Sans Arc; Miniconjou; Yanktonai

Commanders and leaders
Alfred Sully	Sitting Bull

Strength
2,200	~ 1,000

Casualties and losses
~13 dead and wounded	~U.S. estimate 100 dead and wounded, but probably only a few

The Battle of the Badlands was fought in Dakota Territory, in what is now western North Dakota, between the United States army led by General Alfred Sully and the Lakota, Yanktonai, and the Dakota Indian tribes. The battle was fought August 7–9, 1864 between what are now Medora and Sentinel Butte, North Dakota. It was an extension of the conflict begun in the Dakota War of 1862. Sully successfully marched through the badlands encountering only moderate resistance from the Sioux.

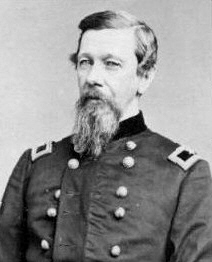
General Alfred Sully

== Background ==
In the aftermath of the Dakota War of 1862, the U.S. government continued to punish the Sioux, including those who had not participated in the war. Large military expeditions into Dakota Territory in 1863 pushed most of the Sioux to the western side of the Missouri River and made safer the frontier of white settlement in Minnesota and the eastern Dakotas. An important impetus to another military campaign against the Sioux was the desire to protect lines of communication with recently discovered goldfields in Montana and Idaho. The lifeline for the American gold miners were steamboats plying the Missouri River through the heart of Sioux territory.

During the winter of 1863–1864, Sully's superior, Major General John Pope ordered Sully to establish several forts along the Missouri River and in the eastern Dakotas to secure the communication routes to the goldfields and to eliminate the Sioux threat to the settlers east of the Missouri River. Sully's army was the largest ever assembled to combat the Plains Indians, comprising more than 4,000 men, many of them in support and supply roles along the Missouri and Yellowstone Rivers.

Sully established Fort Rice on the Missouri River in what is now North Dakota on July 7, 1864. From there, he led 2,200 men into western Dakota Territory. In the Battle of Killdeer Mountain on July 28, Sully defeated about 1,600 Sioux warriors. After the battle the Sioux, along with their women and children, scattered into the Badlands west of Killdeer Mountain, near where the present-day South Unit of Theodore Roosevelt National Park is located. The Dakota badlands are characterized by "deep, impassable ravines" and "high rugged hills."

Although running short of rations, Sully decided to continue his pursuit of the Sioux. A Blackfoot scout said he knew a route through the Badlands passable by Sully's wagon train. After resting, Sully and his men plunged into the unknown terrain ahead. His objective was to continue to pursue the Sioux through the Badlands and then resupply his expedition by marching north to the Yellowstone River where two steamboats full of rations awaited him. Sully followed the Heart River upstream, entering the Badlands on August 5. "One minute they were rolling along on what seemed like limitless prairie; the next men and horses were lost in a maze of narrow gullies and malevolent steeps." Traveling with Sully was an emigrant wagon train of miners and their wives and children.

Lakota leader Sitting Bull described the Indians in the Battle of the Badlands as Hunkpapas, Sans Arcs, and Miniconjou Lakota, Yanktonai, and others.

== The battle ==
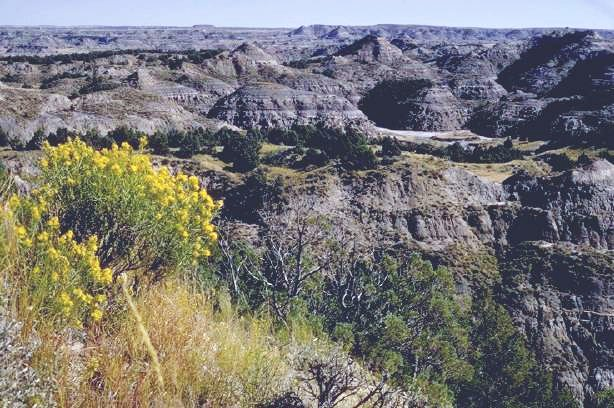
Sully pursued the Sioux through the difficult terrain of the Badlands near present-day Theodore Roosevelt National Park.

On August 6, Sully and his men camped on the banks of the Little Missouri River. The next morning a small group of Sioux opened hostilities by raiding the horse herd of the Seventh Iowa Cavalry, and ambushing one company of the regiment. Hundreds of Sioux warriors appeared on the hilltops near Sully's camp. A few cannon shots dispersed them, but the soldiers spent a nervous night. The next morning Sully and his column moved forward through the badlands.

Sully took all precautions for defense, but a large number of Indian warriors—Sully estimated their numbers at 1,000—appeared on the bluffs and hills at his front and flanks. The Indians showered arrows on the soldiers, and attempted to creep close enough to do serious harm to Sully's army, strung out over three or four miles in the rugged terrain. Sully responded with cannon fire and sallies by some of his cavalry. The assault by the Sioux was more desultory than determined. Near the end of the day, Sully's Blackfoot guide was wounded.

Despite the opposition of the Sioux, Sully and his men advanced about 10 miles on August 8. The next day, Sully was again confronted by a large number of Indians at his front who harassed his passage. About noon Sully broke out of the Badlands onto a large, level plain. With room to maneuver and deploy artillery, he soon dispersed the Indians and the battle was over. Sully found the remains of a large, recently vacated Indian camp. The Indians had apparently scattered in all directions.

Sully estimated the Indian loss in the battle at 100 killed. That seems much exaggerated as the Indians remained at long distance. Sully's losses were probably only the Blackfoot scout and a dozen soldiers wounded.

== Aftermath ==
The Sioux strategy in the Battle of the Badlands, which was more of a running skirmish than a battle, appeared to have been to harass the soldiers, retard their advance, and deprive them and their horses of water. That strategy came close to working after the end of hostilities as Sully and his men struggled across parched desert to reach the Yellowstone River, some 50 miles (80 km) distant. The men were on short rations and only a pint of coffee each, made with alkaline water, per day. The livestock of the expedition died of thirst in large numbers.

On August 12, the soldiers reached the Yellowstone and found there the two steamboats loaded with supplies. With great hardship because of lack of grass for horses and low water, Sully then marched downstream, finding on his arrival at Fort Union at the junction of the Yellowstone and Missouri Rivers, that the Sioux had stampeded and stolen all but two of the horses belonging to the fort. Lacking horses and with an army of worn-out men, Sully abandoned his plan to continue the expedition against the Sioux.

The Sully expedition of 1864 pushed the majority of the hostile Sioux west of the Missouri River into their last strongholds of the Powder River country and the Black Hills. The U.S. would send another large army against them in 1865 in the Powder River Expedition, but they would successfully resist.

== Opposing Forces ==
=== United States ===
Department of the Northwest: MG John Pope (not present in the field)

Division	Brigade	Regiments and Others
District of Iowa BG Alfred Sully	1st Brigade Ltc Samuel M. Pollock	6th Iowa Cavalry, 11 companies: Ltc Samuel M. Pollock; 7th Iowa Cavalry, 3 companies: Ltc John Pattee; Brackett's Minnesota Cavalry Battalion, 4 companies: Maj Alfred B. Brackett; 1st Dakota Cavalry Battalion, 2 companies: Cpt Nelson Miner; Independent Nebraska Company of Indian Scouts: Cpt Christian Stufft; Prairie Battery: Cpt Nathaniel Pope
District of Iowa BG Alfred Sully	2nd Brigade Col Minor T. Thomas	8th Minnesota Infantry, 10 companies: Col Minor T. Thomas, Ltc Henry C. Rogers; 2nd Minnesota Cavalry, 6 companies: Col Robert N. McLaren; 3rd Minnesota Battery: Capt Jones

=== Native Americans ===
- Lakota (Hunkpapa, Sans Arc, Miniconjou), and Dakota (Yanktonai) Sioux: Sitting Bull

== See also ==
- History of North Dakota
- Plains Indians Wars
- List of battles fought in North Dakota
- "Battle of the Badlands Interpretive Site". United States Department of Agriculture.
