= Troop engagements of the American Civil War, 1863 =

Years
1861
1862
1863
1864
1865
or return to the main page.

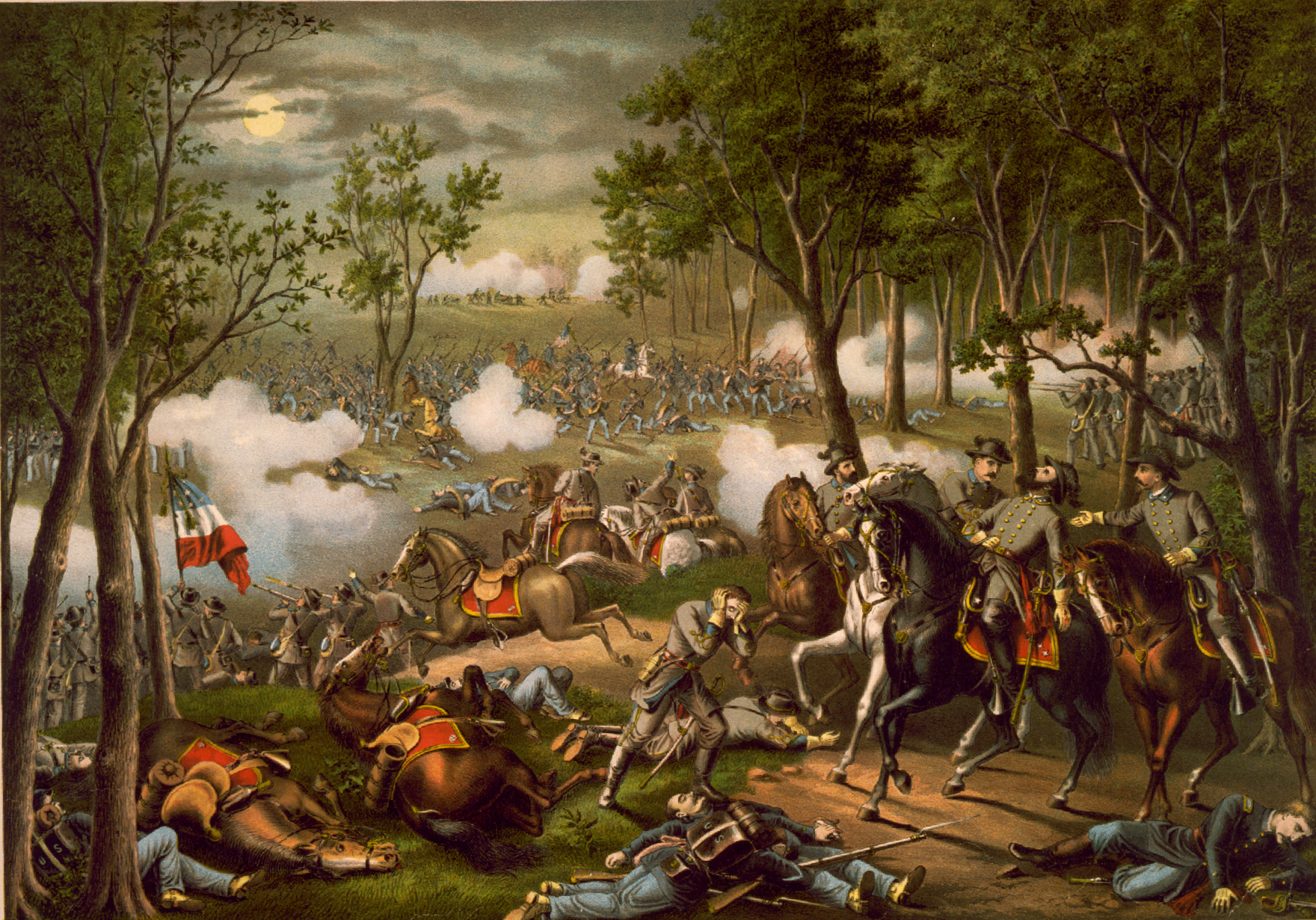
Battle of Chancellorsville by Kurz and Allison (depicting the wounding of Confederate Lt. Gen. Thomas J. "Stonewall" Jackson on May 2, 1863)

The following engagements took place in the year 1863 during the American Civil War. During the year, Union forces captured the Confederate cities of Vicksburg and Port Hudson, giving them complete control over the Mississippi River, while forcing Confederates out of the North following the Battle of Gettysburg.

== History ==
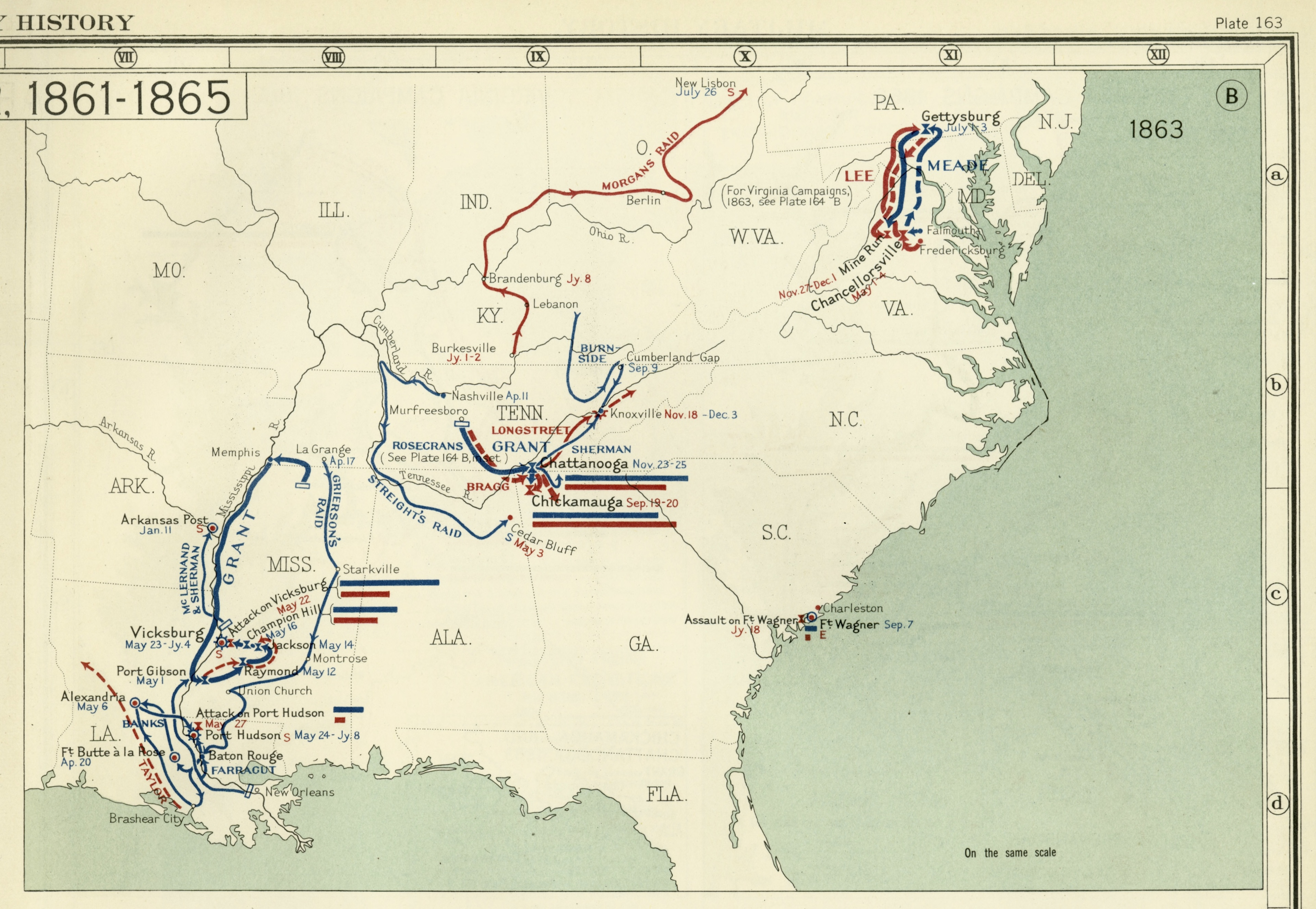
The American Civil War in 1863.

In the Eastern theater, the Union Army of the Potomac, commanded by Major General Joseph Hooker, attacked the Confederate Army of Northern Virginia commanded by General Robert E. Lee in the Battle of Chancellorsville. Hooker planned to move most of his army around to the Confederates's rear before Lee could react and force Lee to retreat but the Union army was slowed and then stopped by a small Confederate force, which was reinforced by the rest of the Confederate army. Lee then sent a flanking column led by Thomas J. Jackson around Hooker's left, which attacked a few hours before sunset on May 2; this attack and further Confederate attacks the following day forced Hooker to retreat on May 6. During the battle, Jackson was wounded by friendly fire and died several days later. Lee reorganized his army following the campaign and launched an invasion of Union territory in June, moving through the Shenandoah Valley into Pennsylvania; Hooker was relieved of command on June 29, due to continuous disputes with the government over the garrison of Harpers Ferry, and replaced by Major General George Meade. During the Battle of Gettysburg from July 1 to July 3, Meade successfully held off Lee's attacks while inflicting heavy casualties in return. Lee was forced to retreat back to Virginia; Meade followed in close pursuit but was unable to find an opportunity to completely crush the Confederate army. In October, Lee attempted to isolate and destroy Meade during the Bristoe Campaign but failed in an attack on Union positions at the Battle of Bristoe Station on October 14. Pressed by Union authorities, Meade also tried to attack Lee's positions along the Mine Run; however, Lee was able to establish a fortified defensive line across the Union line of advance. Meade judged the Confederate position too strong to attack and retreated.

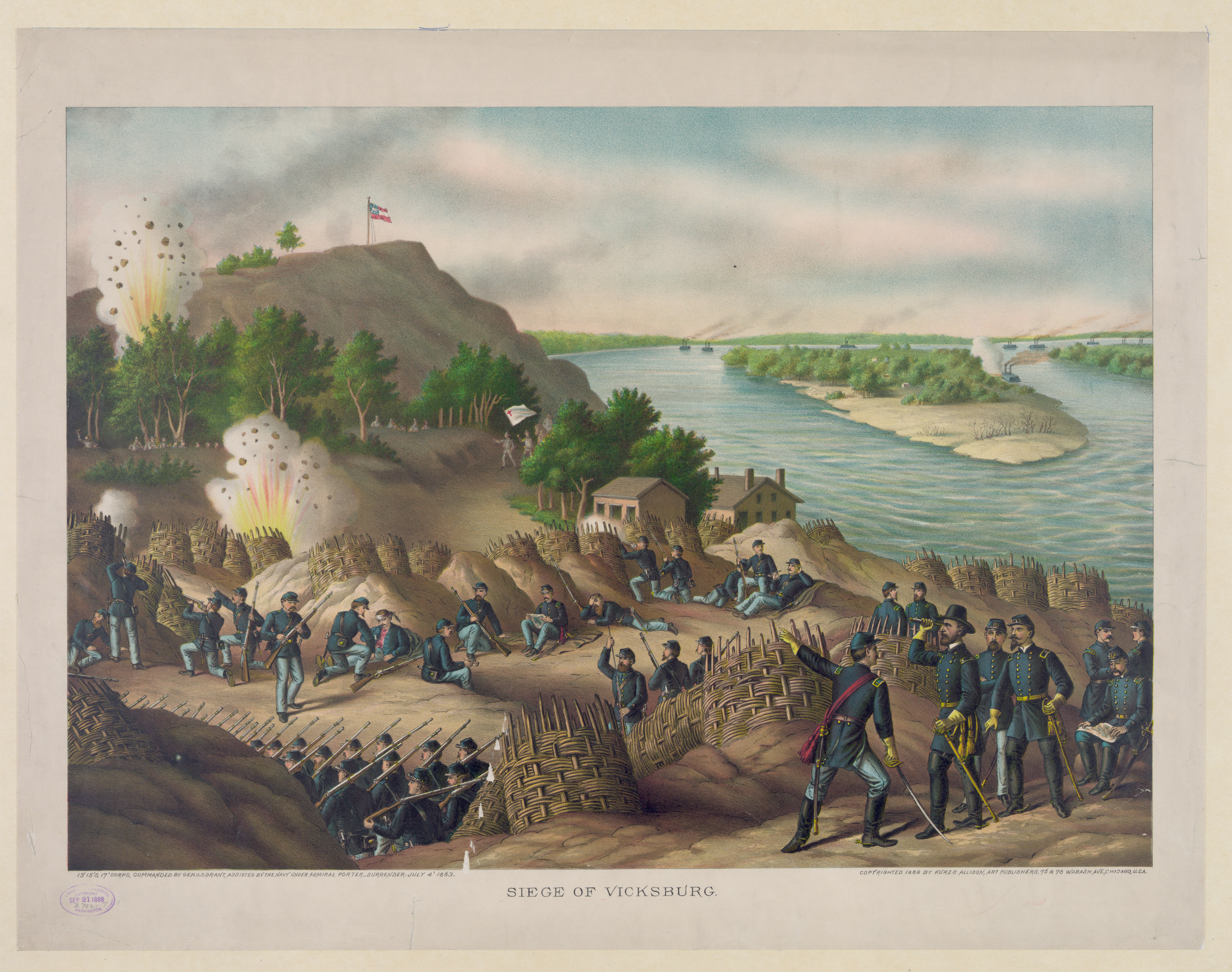
Siege of Vicksburg, by Kurz and Allison.

In the Western Theater, simultaneous Union offensives from northern Mississippi and eastern Louisiana resulted in the sieges of Vicksburg and Port Hudson, both along the Mississippi River. Ulysses S. Grant started the Vicksburg campaign near the end of April when he crossed the Mississippi River near Bruinsburg Landing, south of Grand Gulf. He then marched inland and captured the Mississippi state capital of Jackson before turning east to Vicksburg; this isolated the Confederate garrison from Confederate supplies and reinforcements. After a six-week siege, the Confederate garrison surrendered on July 4, followed by the surrender of Port Hudson on July 9; this resulted in the complete Union control of the Mississippi River and made Grant a hero in the North. In central Tennessee, the Union Army of the Cumberland commanded by Major General William S. Rosecrans maneuvered the Confederate Army of Tennessee, commanded by General Braxton Bragg, towards Chattanooga, Tennessee during the Tullahoma Campaign from late June to early July. In early September, Rosecrans launched another offensive which resulted in the capture of Chattanooga, an important Confederate rail center; however, a few weeks later Bragg, reinforced with James Longstreet's corps from the Army of Northern Virginia, attacked Rosecrans near the Chickamauga Creek and routed much of the Union army, forcing it to retreat back to Chattanooga. Stubborn resistance from the troops of George H. Thomas prevented the Confederates from launching an immediate pursuit. Bragg settled his army into a siege of Chattanooga, almost completely cutting off all supplies to the Union army. Soon, dissension and arguments began to create tension in the Confederate army's high command; this resulted in Longstreet being sent to eastern Tennessee and a reorganization of the army in an attempt by Bragg to rid the army of his critics. Grant, promoted to command of the Military Division of the Mississippi, took command of the Union forces near the city, which was reinforced by the Army of the Tennessee and a detachment from the Army of the Potomac. During the three days from November 23 to the 26, Grant launched a series of attacks on the Confederate positions and was able to drive off Bragg's army. A rear guard action by Patrick Cleaburne at Ringgold Gap halted the Union pursuit long enough for Bragg to reach safety. A few weeks after the battle, Bragg was relieved of command by his own request.

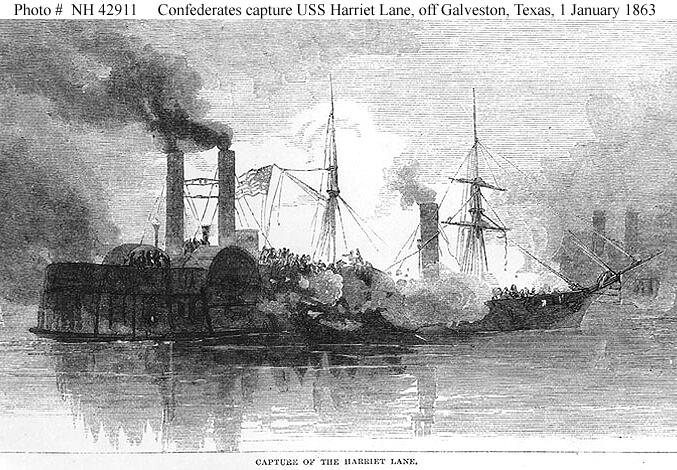
C.S. Bayou City captures the USS Harriet Lane during the Battle of Galveston

In the Trans-Mississippi Theater, only small battles and skirmishes took place. On January 1, Confederate forces led by Major General John B. Magruder recaptured the port city of Galveston, the only port city which the Confederates were able to recapture during the war. In order to cut off the Trans-Mississippi supply lines to Port Hudson, Major General Nathaniel P. Banks moved up the Bayou Teche in Louisiana during April. For the remainder of the summer, Confederate commander Major General Richard Taylor attempted to cut off Banks' supply lines to New Orleans but failed. In September, Union forces tried to invade eastern Texas to counteract the French invasion of Mexico but were defeated at Sabine Pass, losing two gunboats and 350 men while the Confederates suffered no casualties.

== Engagements ==
Date	Engagement	Military units	Losses
January 1	Galveston II, Texas	Confederate District of Texas, Union garrison	Confederate 50, Union 600
January 8	Springfield II, Missouri	Confederate cavalry from District of Arkansas, Union garrison	Confederate 240, Union 163
January 9–10	Arkansas Post, Arkansas	Confederate Army of the Lower Arkansas and White Rivers, Union Army of the Mississippi and Mississippi Squadron	Confederate 5,004, Union 1,092
January 9–11	Hartville, Missouri	Confederate cavalry, Union garrison	Confederate 329, Union 78
January 27 – March 3	Battle of Fort McAllister (1863), Georgia	Confederate garrison, Union squadron from South Atlantic Blockading Squadron	Confederate one, Union none
January 29	Bear River, Idaho	Union infantry, Shoshoni tribe	Union 64, Shoshoni 250
February 3	Dover, Tennessee	Confederate cavalry from Army of Tennessee, Union garrison	Confederate 855, Union 110
March 4–5	Thompson's Station, Tennessee	Confederate cavalry, Union infantry	Confederate 357, Union 1,600
March 13–15	Fort Anderson, North Carolina	Confederate Department of North Carolina, Union garrison	7 total
March 17	Kelly's Ford, Virginia	Cavalry from Confederate Army of Northern Virginia and Union Army of the Potomac	Confederate 80, Union 99
March 20	Vaught's Hill, Tennessee	Confederate and Union cavalry	Confederate 150, Union 38
March 25	Brentwood, Tennessee	Confederate cavalry division, Union garrison	Confederate 3, Union 529
March 30 – April 20	Washington, North Carolina	Confederate Department of North Carolina, Union garrison	100 total
April 7	Charleston Harbor I, South Carolina	Confederate garrison of Fort Sumter, Union South Atlantic Blockading Squadron	Confederate 14, Union 22
April 10	Franklin I, Tennessee	Confederate and Union cavalry	Confederate 137, Union 100
April 12–13	Fort Bisland, Louisiana	Confederate District of West Louisiana, Union XIX Corps	Confederate 450, Union 224
April 13–15	Suffolk I, Virginia	Confederate First Corps, Army of Northern Virginia, Union Department of Virginia	unknown
April 14	Irish Bend, Louisiana	Confederate District of West Louisiana, Union division from XIX Corps	Confederate unknown, Union 353
April 17	Vermilion Bayou, Louisiana	Confederate District of West Louisiana, Union XIX Corps	unknown
April 19	Suffolk II, Virginia	Confederate First Corps, Army of Northern Virginia, Union Department of Virginia	unknown
April 26	Cape Girardeau, Missouri	Confederate cavalry, Union garrison	Confederate 325, Union 12
April 29	Grand Gulf, Mississippi	Confederate batteries from Army of Vicksburg, Union Mississippi squadron	Confederate unknown, Union 80
April 29	Snyder's Bluff, Mississippi	Confederate artillery, Union Mississippi squadron	unknown
April 30	Day's Gap, Alabama	Confederate and Union cavalry	Confederate 65, Union 23
May 1	Port Gibson, Mississippi	Confederate Army of Vicksburg, Union Army of the Tennessee	Confederate 787, Union 875
May 1–2	Chalk Bluff, Arkansas	Confederate cavalry, Union infantry	fewer than 100
May 1–6	Chancellorsville, Virginia	Confederate Army of Northern Virginia, Union Army of the Potomac	Confederate 13,460, Union 17,304
May 3	Fredericksburg II, Virginia	Confederate division from Second Corps, Army of Northern Virginia, Union VI Corps and division from II Corps, Army of the Potomac	Confederate 475, Union 1,100
May 3–4	Salem Church, Virginia	Confederate Army of Northern Virginia, Union VI Corps and division from II Corps, Army of the Potomac	Confederate 674, Union 1,523
May 12	Raymond, Mississippi	Confederate Army of Vicksburg, Union Army of the Tennessee	Confederate 442, Union 514
May 14	Jackson, Mississippi	Confederate garrison, Union Army of the Tennessee	Confederate 850, Union 286
May 16	Champion Hill, Mississippi	Confederate Army of Vicksburg, Union Army of the Tennessee	Confederate 3,840, Union 2,441
May 17	Big Black River Bridge, Mississippi	Confederate Army of Vicksburg, Union Army of the Tennessee	Confederate 1,741, Union 276
May 18 – July 4	Vicksburg, Mississippi	Confederate Army of Vicksburg, Union Army of the Tennessee	Confederate 32,697 (29,495 surrendered), Union 4,835
May 21	Plains Store, Louisiana	Confederate Department of Mississippi, Union Department of the Gulf	Confederate 100, Union 150
May 22 – July 9	Port Hudson, Louisiana	Confederate garrison, Union Department of the Gulf	Confederate 7,500, Union 10,000
June 7	Milliken's Bend, Louisiana	Confederate division, Union garrison	Confederate 185, Union 652
June 9	Brandy Station, Virginia	Cavalry corps from Army of Northern Virginia, Union Army of the Potomac	Confederate 515, Union 866
June 13–15	Winchester II, Virginia	Confederate Second Corps, Army of Northern Virginia, Union garrison from Middle Department	Confederate 269, Union 4,443
June 17	Aldie, Virginia	Cavalry from Confederate Army of Northern Virginia and Union Army of the Potomac	Confederate 119, Union 300
June 19	Middleburg, Virginia	Cavalry from Confederate Army of Northern Virginia and Union Army of the Potomac	unknown
June 19	Ashby's Gap, Virginia	Cavalry from Confederate Army of Northern Virginia and Union Army of the Potomac	unknown
June 20–21	LaFourche Crossing, Louisiana	Confederate District of West Louisiana, Union garrison	Confederate 219, Union 49
June 21	Upperville, Virginia	Cavalry from Confederate Army of Northern Virginia and Union Army of the Potomac	unknown
June 24–26	Hoover's Gap, Tennessee	Confederate Army of Tennessee, Union Army of the Cumberland	Confederate unknown, Union 583
June 28	Donaldsonville II, Louisiana	Confederate District of West Louisiana, Union garrison	Confederate 301, Union 23
June 28	Near Fort Rice, North Dakota	Party of Sioux Indians, Union Department of the Northwest	Sioux three, Union one
June 29	Oyster's Point (Camp Hill), Pennsylvania	Confederate cavalry brigade, Army of Northern Virginia, Union Department of the Susquehanna	Confederate none, Union one wounded
June 29–30	Goodrich's Landing, Louisiana	Confederate cavalry, Union garrison	Confederate 6, Union 150
June 30	Hanover, Pennsylvania	Cavalry from Confederate Army of Northern Virginia and Union Army of the Potomac	Confederate 150, Union 200
June 30	Sporting Hill, Pennsylvania	Confederate cavalry brigade, Army of Northern Virginia, Union Department of the Susquehanna	Confederate 35–45, Union unknown
July 1–3	Gettysburg, Pennsylvania	Confederate Army of Northern Virginia, Union Army of the Potomac	Confederate 22,625, Union 22,813
July 1–2	Cabin Creek, Oklahoma	Confederate Cherokees and Texas cavalry, Union infantry	Confederate 59, Union 21
July 1	Hunterstown, Pennsylvania	Cavalry from Confederate Army of Northern Virginia and Union Army of the Potomac	unknown
July 3	Fairfield, Pennsylvania	Confederate cavalry brigade, Army of Northern Virginia, Union 6th U.S. Cavalry Regiment	Confederate 44, Union 242
July 4	Helena, Arkansas	Confederate District of Arkansas, Union garrison	Confederate 1,636, Union 239
July 6	Williamsport, Maryland	Cavalry from Confederate Army of Northern Virginia and Union Army of the Potomac	Confederate 254, Union 400
July 7	Funkstown, Maryland	Cavalry from Confederate Army of Northern Virginia and Union Army of the Potomac	unknown
July 8	Boonsboro, Maryland	Cavalry from Confederate Army of Northern Virginia and Union Army of the Potomac	100 total
July 9	Corydon, Indiana	Confederate cavalry, Union militia	Confederate 51, Union 360
July 10	Funkstown, Maryland	Cavalry from Confederate Army of Northern Virginia and Union Army of the Potomac	479 total
July 10–11	Fort Wagner I, South Carolina	Confederate garrison of Fort Wagner, Union Department of the South	Confederate 12, Union 339
July 12	Jackson, Mississippi	Confederate Department of the West, Union Army of the Tennessee	Confederate 50, Union 510
July 12–13	Kock's Plantation, Louisiana	Confederate District of West Louisiana, Union Department of the Gulf	Confederate 33, Union 465
July 14	Hoke's Run or Falling Waters, Maryland	Confederate division from Army of Northern Virginia, Union cavalry from Army of the Potomac	unknown
July 16	Grimball's Landing, South Carolina	Confederate Department of South Carolina, Georgia, and Florida, Union Department of the South	Confederate 18, Union 46
July 17	Honey Springs, Oklahoma	Confederate division from Trans-Mississippi Department, Union Army of the Border	Confederate 134, Union 77
July 18	Fort Wagner II, South Carolina	Confederate garrison of Fort Wagner, Union Department of the South	Confederate 222, Union 1,515
July 19	Buffington Island, Ohio	Confederate cavalry, Union infantry and cavalry	Confederate 900, Union 25
July 23	Manassas Gap, Virginia	Confederate Army of Northern Virginia, Union Army of the Potomac	440 total
July 24	Big Mound, North Dakota	Union Department of the Northwest, Dakotas (Sisseton and Wahpeton tribes)	Union 7, Dakotas 80
July 26	Salineville, Ohio	Confederate cavalry, Union cavalry	Confederate 364, Union none
July 26	Dead Buffalo, North Dakota	Union Department of the Northwest, Dakota (Sisseton and Yanktonais tribes) and Teton Lakota (Hunkpapa and Blackfeet tribes)	Union 1, Dakotas and Lakotas 9
July 28	Stony Lake, North Dakota	Union Department of the Northwest, Dakotas and Lakotas tribes	Union none, Dakotas and Lakotas unknown
August 17 – September 8	Fort Sumter II, South Carolina	Confederate garrison of Fort Sumter, Union Department of the South	unknown
August 21	Lawrence, Kansas	Confederate guerrillas, Union civilians	Confederate none, Union 150
August 21	Chattanooga II, Tennessee	Confederate Army of Tennessee, Union Army of the Cumberland	unknown
September 1	Devil's Backbone, Arkansas	Confederate and Union cavalry	Confederate 17, Union 14
September 3–4	Whitestone Hill, North Dakota	Union Department of North Dakota, Dakota tribes	Union 60, Dakotas 350
September 5–8	Charleston Harbor II, South Carolina	Confederate garrison of Fort Wagner, Union Department of the South	Confederate 100, Union 117
September 8	Sabine Pass II, Texas	Confederate company of 1st Texas Heavy Artillery, Union gunboats from West Gulf Blockading Squadron	Confederate none, Union 350
September 8	Telford's Station, Tennessee	Confederate Thomas' Legion, Union 100th Ohio Infantry	unknown
September 10	Bayou Fourche, Arkansas	Confederate Marmaduke and Walker's cavalry divisions, Union Department of the Missouri Cavalry Division	Confederate 64, Union 72
September 10–11	Davis' Cross Roads, Georgia	Confederate Army of Tennessee, Union Army of the Cumberland	unknown
September 19–20	Chickamauga, Georgia	Confederate Army of Tennessee, Union Army of the Cumberland	Confederate 18,454, Union 16,179
September 22	Blountville, Tennessee	Confederate cavalry, Union Army of the Ohio	Confederate 165, Union 27
September 29	Stirling's Plantation, Louisiana	Confederate District of West Louisiana, Union Department of the Gulf	Confederate 121, Union 515
October 6	Baxter Springs, Kansas	Confederate guerrillas, Union Department of Kansas	Confederate 3, Union 70
October 10	Blue Springs, Tennessee	Confederate cavalry, Union Army of the Ohio	Confederate 216, Union 100
October 11	Henderson's Mill, Tennessee	Confederate cavalry detachment from Department of Southwestern Virginia, Union 5th Indiana Cavalry	unknown
October 13	Auburn I, Virginia	Confederate Army of Northern Virginia, Union Army of the Potomac	50 total
October 14	Auburn II, Virginia	Confederate Army of Northern Virginia, Union Army of the Potomac	115 total
October 14	Bristoe Station, Virginia	Confederate Army of Northern Virginia, Union Army of the Potomac	Confederate 1,380, Union 540
October 16–18	Fort Brooke, Florida	Confederate garrison, Union East Gulf Blockading Squadron	Confederate unknown, Union 16
October 19	Buckland Mills, Virginia	Confederate Army of Northern Virginia, Union Army of the Potomac	230 total
October 24	Washington, Louisiana	Confederate District of West Louisiana, Union detachment from Army of the Gulf	unknown
October 25	Pine Bluff, Arkansas	Marmaduke's Division (Confederate), Post of Pine Bluff (Union)	Confederate 40, Union 56
October 28 – 29	Wauhatchie, Tennessee	Confederate Army of Tennessee, Union Army of the Cumberland	Confederate 356, Union 216
November 2 – 6	Brownsville, Texas	Confederate District of Texas, New Mexico, and Arizona, Union detachment from XIII Corps	unknown
November 3	Collierville II, Tennessee	Confederate and Union cavalry	Confederate 95, Union 60
November 3	Bayou Bourbeau, Louisiana	Confederate cavalry from District of West Louisiana, Union XIII Corps	Confederate 125, Union 154
November 6	Droop Mountain, West Virginia	Confederate Department of Southwest Virginia, Union Department of West Virginia	Confederate 275, Union 140
November 7	Rappahannock Station, Virginia	Confederate Army of Northern Virginia, Union Army of the Potomac	Confederate 2,041, Union 461
November 16	Campbell's Station, Tennessee	Confederate First Corps, Army of Northern Virginia, Union Army of the Ohio	Confederate 570, Union 400
November 23 – 25	Chattanooga III, Tennessee	Confederate Army of Tennessee, Union Military Division of the Mississippi	Confederate 6,667, Union 5,815
November 26 – December 2	Mine Run, Virginia	Confederate Army of Northern Virginia, Union Army of the Potomac	Confederate 795, Union 1,633
November 27	Ringgold Gap, Georgia	Confederate Army of Tennessee, Union Military Division of the Mississippi	Confederate 221, Union 507
November 29	Fort Sanders, Tennessee	Confederate Army of Tennessee, Union Army of the Ohio	Confederate 800, Union 15
December 14	Bean's Station, Tennessee	Confederate First Corps, Army of Northern Virginia, Union Army of the Ohio	Confederate 222, Union 115
December 29	Mossy Creek, Tennessee	Confederate First Corps, Army of Northern Virginia, Union Army of the Ohio	Confederate unknown, Union 151

== See also ==
- Mississippi River campaigns in the American Civil War

== Sources ==
- Castel, Albert. Civil War Kansas: Reaping the Whirlwind. Lawrence, Kansas: University Press of Kansas, 1997. ISBN 978-0-7006-0872-0.
- Chaitin, Peter M. The Coastal War: Chesapeake Bay to Rio Grande. Alexandria, Virginia: Time-Life Books, 1984. ISBN 0-8094-4732-0.
- Cozzens, Peter. This Terrible Sound: The Battle of Chickamauga. Urbanna, Illinois: University of Illinois Press, 1992. ISBN 978-0-252-01703-2.
- Crew, Vernon H. "The Thomas Legion", in Civil War Times Illustrated, Vol. X, no. 3 (June 1971), pp. 40–45. ISSN 0009-8094
- Hurst, Jack. Nathan Bedford Forrest: A Biography. New York: Alfred A. Knopf, 1993. ISBN 0-394-55189-3.
- Josephy, Jr., Alvin M. The Civil War in the American West. New York: Alfred A. Knopf, 1991. ISBN 978-0-394-56482-1.
- Kennedy, Frances H. The Civil War Battlefield Guide, 2nd edition. New York: Houghton Mifflin, 1998. ISBN 978-0-395-74012-5.
- Longacre, Edward. The Cavalry at Gettysburg: A Tactical Study of Mounted Operations during the Civil War's Pivotal Campaign, 9 June – 14 July 1863. Lincoln, Nebraska: University of Nebraska Press, 1993. ISBN 978-0-8032-7941-4.
- Nye, Wilbur Sturtevant. Here Come the Rebels! Dayton, Ohio: Morningside Bookshop, 1988. OCLC 38910989
- Parrish, T. Michael. Richard Taylor: Soldier Prince of Dixie. Chapel Hill, North Carolina: University of North Carolina Press, 1992. ISBN 978-0-8078-2032-2
- Sears, Stephen W. Chancellorsville. New York: Mariner Books, 1996. ISBN 978-0-395-63417-2
- Sears, Stephen W. Gettysburg. New York: Houghton Mifflin, 2003. ISBN 978-0-395-86761-7.
- Sheppard, Jonathan C. By the Noble and Daring of Her Sons: The Florida Brigade of the Army of Tennessee. Tuscaloosa, Alabama: University of Alabama Press, 2012. ISBN 978-0-8173-1707-2.
- Wert, Jeffry D. General James Longstreet: The Confederacy's Most Controversial Soldier – A Biography. New York: Simon & Schuster, 1993. ISBN 0-671-70921-6
- Wittenberg, Eric J., J. David Petruzzi, and Michael F. Nugent. One Continuous Fight: The Retreat from Gettysburg and the Pursuit of Lee's Army of Northern Virginia, July 4th–14th, 1863. New York: Savas Beatie, 2008. ISBN 978-1-932714-43-2.
