= Samuel McPhail =

American settler and judge (1826–1902)

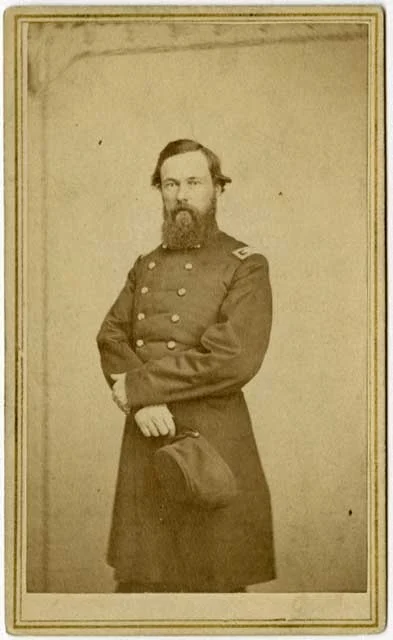
- Samuel McPhail in 1862 by Joel Emmons Whitney
- Born: May 2, 1826; Russellville, Kentucky, U.S.
- Died: March 6, 1902 (aged 75); Alta Vista Township, Minnesota, U.S.
- Burial place: Canby City Cemetery, Canby, Minnesota, U.S.
- Spouse: Martha "Minnie" Kingston
- Military career
- Allegiance: Union Army
- Branch: Army
- Service years: 1846–1847; 1862–1866
- Rank: Colonel
- Units: Company C, 3rd Regiment of Illinois Volunteers.; 1st Minnesota Cavalry Regiment
- Commands: 1st Minnesota Cavalry Regiment
- Conflicts: Mexican-American War; Battle of Cerro Gordo; Siege of Veracruz; American Civil War; Dakota War of 1862; Battle of Birch Coulee; Battle of Big Mound; Battle of Dead Buffalo Lake; Battle of Stony Lake
- Other work: Owner of the newspaper The Redwood Falls Patriot.; Probate Judge.; County Attorney of Redwood County, Minnesota and Lincoln County, Minnesota.

Samuel McPhail (May 2, 1826 – March 6, 1902) was a Minnesota settler, lawyer, judge, military officer, and is the founder of Caledonia, Redwood Falls, Alta Vista Township, and Redwood County, Minnesota.

== Early life ==
McPhail was born on May 2, 1826, in Russellville, Kentucky, to John McPhail and Hannah McAdams, both of whom were of Scottish ancestry. He attended a military school in his youth and later participated in the Mexican–American War as a private in Company C, 3rd Regiment of Illinois Volunteers. McPhail and the 3rd Illinois Volunteers were present at the Battle of Cerro Gordo and the Siege of Veracruz. After the war McPhail married Martha "Minnie" Kingston and moved to Minnesota Territory in 1850. Together the McPhails had four children, two of which died at young ages.

McPhail arrived in Brownsville, Minnesota in 1850, where he first settled. He platted what would become the city of Caledonia, Minnesota, from 1854 to 1855, and was greatly responsible for it becoming the county seat of Houston County. He named the city Caledonia after the Latin name given to Scotland by the Roman Empire. Two plots of land were donated by McPhail to erect a school, as well as two more plots to erect a Methodist Church.

== Involvement in the Dakota War ==
At the outbreak of the Dakota War of 1862, McPhail organized a 200-man mounted volunteer militia which served during the Battle of Birch Coulee as part of Henry Hastings Sibley's relief column.

On October 10, 1862, McPhail became the commanding officer of the 1st Minnesota Cavalry Regiment, with the rank of Colonel. The 1st Minnesota Cavalry would go on to fight against the Dakota in several punitive expeditions under Henry Hastings Sibley and Alfred Sully at the Battle of Big Mound, the Battle of Dead Buffalo Lake, and the Battle of Stony Lake. McPhail mustered out of service with the rest of the regiment between October 20 to December 7, 1863.

== Founding of Redwood Falls and Redwood County ==
On May 2, 1864, McPhail came to what is now Redwood Falls, Minnesota with a party of four other land speculators in order to claim land. The settlement itself consisted of a stockade wall made of sod and reinforced with a four-foot ditch, along with a log cabin lined with bricks on the inside for added protection. Settler John St. George Honner later joined McPhail at the stockade in 1864 and would settle in the northern section of what is now Honner Township, which was named after him.

A year later, McPhail platted the town of Redwood Falls. He became the judge of probate, the first county attorney, the first road supervisor, and the editor of The Redwood Falls Patriot newspaper. By 1874, Redwood Falls had a population of 200 people and was established as the county seat of Redwood County.

== Later life in Lincoln County ==
In 1875, McPhail moved to Lincoln County, Minnesota, where he would reside for the remainder of his life. He founded Alta Vista Township that year. It is believed that he derived the name Alta Vista from his time spent in Mexico during the Mexican–American War, alta or alto meaning "high" and vista meaning "pleasing view". He served as the county attorney and county surveyor for Lincoln County; he later became an arborist and studied different species of Minnesota trees. McPhail's wife, Martha, died in 1885; he later remarried and had several more children.

== Death and legacy ==
Samuel McPhail died on March 2, 1902, from stomach cancer at his farm in Alta Vista Township. He was initially buried at his farm, but was later moved to the Canby City Cemetery in Canby, Minnesota.

The McPhail's Butte Overlook is a state historic site owned and operated by the State Historical Society of North Dakota along the Sibley Trail. It is so named because Colonel McPhail utilized the area as an overlook and vantage point during the Battle of Big Mound where the 1st Minnesota Cavalry Regiment controlled the highest vantage point during the course of the battle.

McPhail is credited with founding several places in the state of Minnesota: Redwood County, Redwood Falls, Alta Vista Township, and Caledonia.
