= Hiram S. Bailey =

American politician and soldier (1829–1901)

Hiram Sanford Bailey

County Commissioner of Jackson County, Minnesota

Personal details
- Born: June 17, 1829 Montgomery, Vermont, U.S.
- Died: April 20, 1901 (aged 71) Jackson, Minnesota, U.S.
- Resting place: Riverside Cemetery, Jackson, Minnesota, U.S.
- Education: Bakersfield Academy

Military service
- Allegiance: United States of America
- Branch/service: Union Army
- Years of service: 1861-1865
- Rank: Major
- Unit: 2nd Minnesota Infantry Regiment; 6th Minnesota Infantry Regiment
- Commands: Company C, 6th Minnesota Infantry Regiment
- Battles/wars: American Civil War; Battle of Mill Springs; Siege of Corinth; Battle of Perryville; Siege of Spanish Fort; Battle of Fort Blakeley; U.S.-Dakota War of 1862; Battle of Birch Coulee; Battle of Wood Lake; Sibley's 1863 Campaign; Battle of Big Mound; Battle of Dead Buffalo Lake; Battle of Stony Lake

Hiram Sanford Bailey (June 17, 1829 – April 20, 1901), sometimes written as H. S. Bailey, was an American businessman, politician, and American Civil War veteran who platted and organized the city of Jackson, Minnesota, the county seat of Jackson County, Minnesota.

== Early life ==
Hiram Sanford Bailey was born on June 17, 1829 in Montgomery, Vermont to parents Richard Bailey and Sally M. Barrows. Bailey was educated in the common schools located in both Montgomery and the neighboring community of Waterville, Vermont before graduating from the Bakersfield Academy located in Bakersfield, Vermont. In 1853 Bailey moved west to Wisconsin, originally settling on a farm in Waupun, Wisconsin in Dodge County until 1856. That same year Bailey moved to Minnesota Territory and settled in Fillmore County, Minnesota shortly before the American Civil War.

== Military service ==
At the outbreak of the American Civil War Bailey volunteered for service in the Union Army on June 26, 1861. Bailey originally served as a Sergeant in Company A, nicknamed the "Chatfield Guards" in the 2nd Minnesota Infantry Regiment under the command of Captain Judson Wade Bishop. Bailey was later discharged from the 2nd Minnesota on October 31, 1862 for promotion to the rank of Captain of Company C in the newly raised 6th Minnesota Infantry Regiment.

The 6th Minnesota was originally raised to quell the Dakota War of 1862 in southern and western Minnesota during the summer of 1862 and saw action at the Battle of Birch Coulee and the Battle of Wood Lake in Minnesota before being utilized in Sibley's 1863 Campaign against the Dakota. Bailey was one of the officers selected from the 6th Minnesota alongside Hiram P. Grant to serve on the military tribunal which oversaw the 1862 Mankato mass execution in Mankato, Minnesota on December 28, 1862. Following Sibley's 1863 Campaign against the Dakota, Bailey was promoted to the rank of Major on October 28, 1864 before fighting in the Mobile campaign at the Battle of Spanish Fort and the Battle of Fort Blakeley. Bailey was mustered out of service on August 19, 1865 with the rest of the regiment.

== Political career and business ==
Following the war Bailey moved to Jackson County, Minnesota and helped found the county seat of Jackson, Minnesota alongside settler Welch Ashley. Bailey had originally travelled to the vicinity of Jackson, Minnesota while on outpost duty during the immediate aftermath of the Dakota conflict in March 1864. Bailey was so well pleased with the area and its proximity to the Des Moines River that he planted a land claim on what is now the city of Jackson, Minnesota. Bailey platted and organized the city of Jackson, and the first Jackson County elections were held in his home. Bailey was later elected as the county commissioner of Jackson County, the court commissioner, the superintendent of schools, was a member of the county board of education, and served as the city's justice of the peace. Bailey was also the owner and operator of a general store and brickyard located in Jackson which produced red brick for the local populace. Bailey was also involved with many social affairs of the city of Jackson including the Grand Army of the Republic (GAR), which Bailey was the Senior Vice Commander of Wadsworth Post No. 30 of the GAR in Jackson.

== Personal life ==
Bailey was married to Jane Wheele in Richford, Vermont, in 1852. Together they had five children.
