= Sibley's 1863 Campaign =

Sibley's 1863 Campaign Sibley's Expedition
- Part of the Sioux Wars and the American Civil War
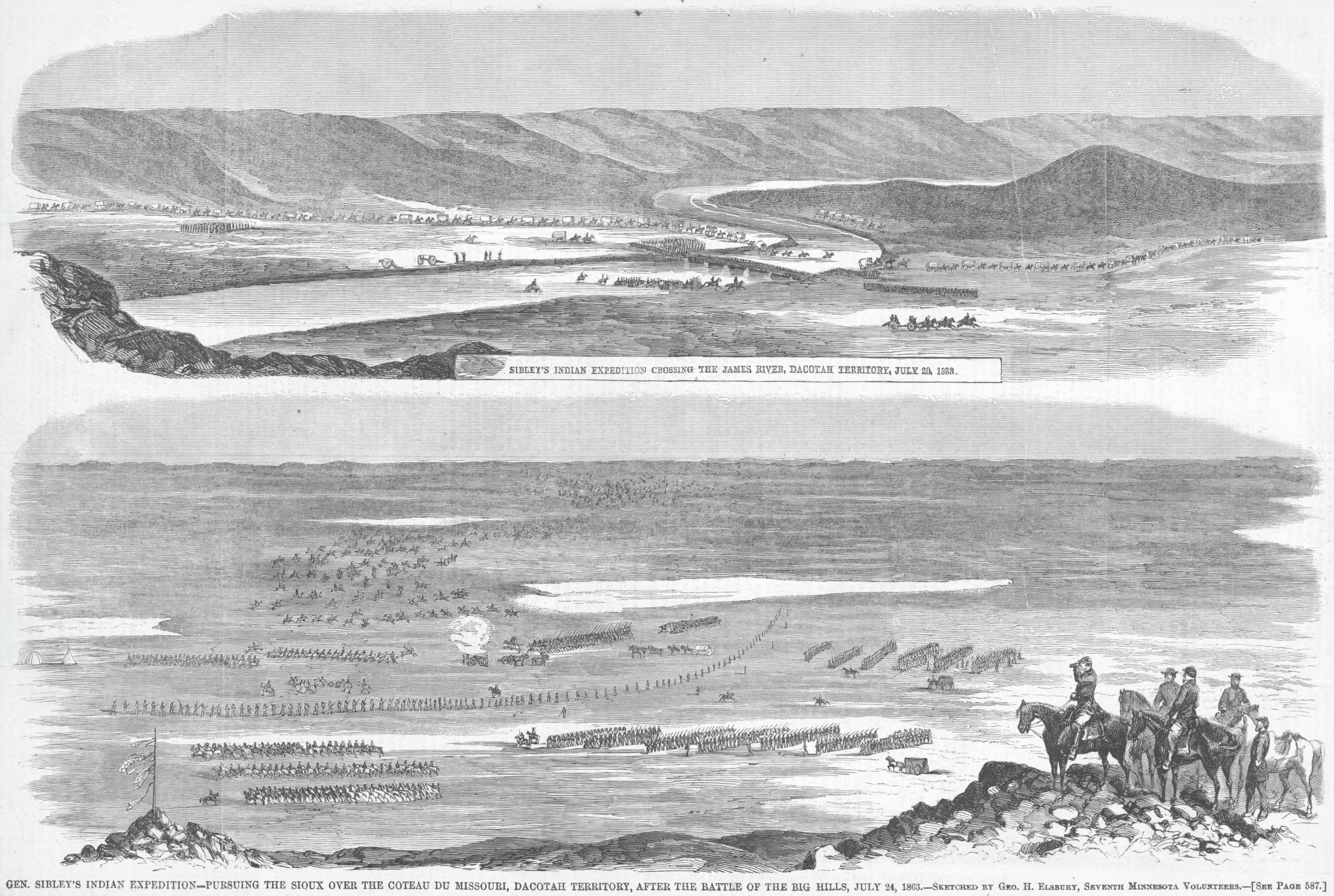
- The Battle of Big Mound by Harper's Weekly, 1863
Date	June to September, 1863
Location	Dakota Territory (present-day North Dakota, U.S.)
Result	United States victory

Belligerents
United States	Santee Sioux; Teton Sioux; Yankton; Yanktonai

Commanders and leaders
Henry Hastings Sibley	Inkpaduta; Sitting Bull; Gall

Units involved
1st Minnesota Cavalry Regiment; 3rd Minnesota Light Artillery Battery; 6th Minnesota Infantry Regiment; 7th Minnesota Infantry Regiment; 10th Minnesota Infantry Regiment	Gall's Band; Sitting Bull's Band; Inkpaduta's Band; Multiple civilians and warriors

Strength
2,056	1,000 to 2,500 (peak at Battle of Stony Lake)

Sibley's 1863 Campaign, also called Sibley's Expedition was a punitive expedition led by Brigadier General Henry Hastings Sibley following the Dakota War of 1862. The campaign's goal was to suppress and disperse the Dakota people and their allies who had fled westward following their defeat in Minnesota at the Battle of Wood Lake. Sibley's expedition was part of a broader series of confrontations between the United States and Native American tribes during the 19th century which became known as the Sioux Wars. The campaign primarily took place in a series of confrontations in the modern-day state of North Dakota and include the Battle of Big Mound, the Battle of Dead Buffalo Lake, and the Battle of Stony Lake. Sibley's campaign occurred from June to September 1863.

== Background ==
The Dakota War of 1862, also known as the Sioux Uprising, resulted from deep-seated tensions between the Dakota Sioux and white settlers in Minnesota Territory. Economic hardship, broken treaties, and delayed annuity payments from the U.S. government exacerbated Dakota frustrations, culminating in an uprising in August 1862. Following the defeat of Thaóyate Dúta and the Dakota forces and mass trials, many Dakota fled westward into the Dakota Territory.

In response, General Sibley, who had led U.S. forces during the latter stages of the 1862 conflict, was tasked by Major General John Pope with pursuing and neutralizing these bands to prevent further violence along the frontier. Previous to the expedition Sibley was appointed by Pope as the commander of the Military District of Minnesota.

== Objectives ==
Sibley's objectives were threefold:

1. To punish the Dakota Sioux responsible for the uprising.
2. To prevent further incursions into Minnesota settlements.
3. To establish a U.S. military presence in Dakota Territory, facilitating westward expansion.

== The Campaign ==
=== Organization of Forces ===
Sibley's force was composed of approximately 2,000 men, primarily Minnesota volunteer infantry and cavalry regiments, supported by artillery units. These units included three regiments of Minnesota infantry including the 6th Minnesota Infantry Regiment, the 7th Minnesota Infantry Regiment, and the 10th Minnesota Infantry Regiment, who were supported by elements of the 1st Minnesota Cavalry Regiment and the 3rd Minnesota Light Artillery Battery commanded by Captain John W. Jones. In addition to the main body was a detachment of 100 men from Company A of the 9th Minnesota Infantry Regiment along with 70 Native Americans and Métis (also called "mixed-blood") scouts.

Sibley's force was to take part in a double envelopment maneuver across the Dakota Territory alongside General Alfred Sully, commander of the Military District of Iowa. Sully's force consisted of roughly 1,200 soldiers of the 6th Iowa Cavalry Regiment, the 7th Iowa Cavalry Regiment, the 2nd Nebraska Cavalry Regiment, and an artillery battery of Howitzers. Sully's force would take part in a separate punitive expedition known as Sully's Expedition, which was to take place concurrently with Sibley.

=== Battle of Big Mound (July 24, 1863) ===
Sibley's column encountered a large Dakota encampment near present-day Tappen, North Dakota. After initial skirmishing, the Dakota were forced to abandon their position. The engagement resulted in several Dakota casualties and marked the beginning of their retreat westward.

=== Battle of Dead Buffalo Lake (July 26, 1863) ===
As the Dakota regrouped at Dead Buffalo Lake, Sibley's forces launched an attack on the following day. A fierce battle ensued with both sides exchanging artillery and small arms fire. The Dakota attempted to capture Sibley's supply wagons but were ultimately repelled.

=== Battle of Stony Lake (July 28, 1863) ===
The final significant battle occurred at Stony Lake in modern-day Burleigh County, North Dakota. Sibley's forces inflicted further losses on the retreating Dakota bands, who dispersed further into the plains.

== Aftermath ==
Following these engagements, the Dakota Sioux split into smaller groups, some moving into Canada and others westward towards the Missouri River. The campaign effectively reduced the Dakota's capacity to threaten Minnesota settlements.

Sibley established several military outposts, including Fort Rice and Fort Abraham Lincoln, cementing U.S. control over the region. Sibley also created the military road which is now known as the Sibley Trail which is managed by the State Historical Society of North Dakota.

== Legacy ==
Historians debate the long-term effectiveness and morality of Sibley's campaign. While it temporarily curtailed Dakota resistance, it also led to increased displacement and hardship for Native populations. Some historians, such as Minnesota historian Collin Mustful argue the effectiveness and ethics of Sibley's campaign stating "Those whom Sibley and his column pursued were not a war party, but a community of nomadic hunters that were not involved in the attacks against the Minnesota settlements the previous summer - Furthermore, it was only the beginning of a decades-long conflict with the United States".

According to MNopedia writer Rhoda R. Gilman, Sibley later used his position within the Army and as a previous politician "to try to protect other Dakota from the anti-Native hysteria of white citizens. His restraint earned him abuse in Minnesota newspapers for being "soft" on Natives".

Sibley’s actions, whether restrained or not, are linked to the broader U.S. government policies of Indian removals in Minnesota and the idea of manifest destiny. Today, sites like Dead Buffalo Lake and Stony Lake are recognized for their historical significance, with some efforts made to memorialize both the U.S. soldiers and Dakota who fought there.

== See also ==
- Dakota War of 1862
- Sully's Expedition (1863–1864)
- Henry Hastings Sibley
- Western theater of the American Indian Wars
- Manifest Destiny
- Sioux Wars
