= Horace Austin =

American politician (1831–1905)

Captain Horace Austin
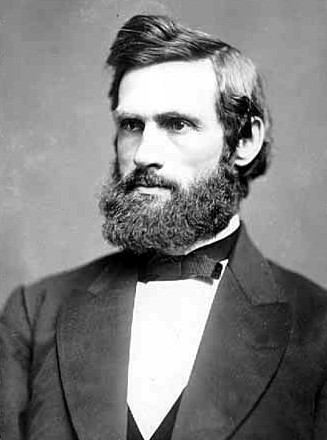
- Austin while Governor

6th Governor of Minnesota
- In office January 9, 1870 – January 7, 1874
- Lieutenant: William H. Yale
- Preceded by: William Rainey Marshall
- Succeeded by: Cushman Davis

Personal details
- Born: October 15, 1831 Canterbury, Connecticut, U.S.
- Died: November 2, 1905 (aged 74) Minneapolis, Minnesota, U.S.
- Resting place: Oakland Cemetery, Saint Paul, Minnesota, U.S.
- Party: Republican
- Spouse: Mary Lena Morill
- Profession: lawyer, judge

Military service
- Allegiance: Union Army
- Branch/service: United States Army
- Years of service: October 17, 1862 - November 9, 1863.
- Rank: Captain
- Unit: 1st Minnesota Cavalry Regiment
- Commands: Company B, 1st Minnesota Cavalry Regiment
- Battles/wars: American Civil War: Sibley's Expedition Against the Sioux; Battle of Big Mound; Battle of Dead Buffalo Lake; Battle of Stony Lake

Horace Austin (October 15, 1831 – November 2, 1905) was an American politician. He served as the sixth governor of Minnesota, serving two terms, from January 9, 1870, to January 7, 1874. He was a Republican.

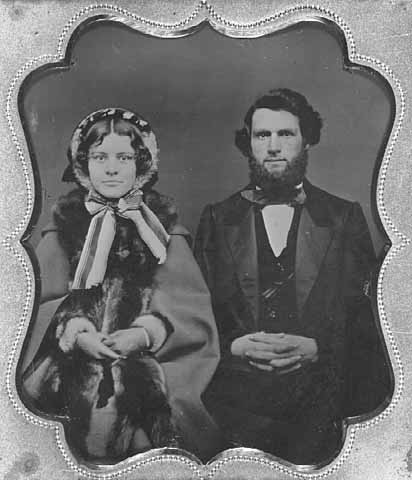
Horace Austin and Mary Lena Morill on their wedding day, 1859.

Born in 1831 in Canterbury, Connecticut, the son of a prosperous Connecticut farmer and graduate of a private academy, Austin taught school briefly before studying law. He was 25 when he moved to Minnesota and began practicing law in St. Peter. Six years later he joined the local Frontier Guards at the outbreak of the Dakota War of 1862. During the ensuing campaigns against the Dakota Austin served as the Captain of Company B in the 1st Minnesota Cavalry Regiment. He later. became a judge for the Sixth Judicial District. He selected future governor Andrew Ryan McGill as his personal secretary.

== Governor ==
In 1869, Austin ran for Governor. He was nominated for a reputation for objectivity and disdain for contentious party politics. This was to counter his opponent, George L. Otis, who ran a campaign mostly centered on fears of internal corruption should the Republican Party continue its domination of the state's government. Austin would easily win the 1869 Minnesota gubernatorial election.

Austin was determined to bring legislative power to bear against the railroad barons. His advocacy of strictly regulated passenger and freight rates and his opposition to the wholesale allocation of state lands to railroad development, promising to "Shake the railroads over hell". During his term the Minnesota Board of Health (a precursor to the Minnesota Department of Health) was established.

Austin would win re-election in 1871, in a landslide against opponent Winthrop Young. Young's campaign collapsed in the week prior to the election due to a scandal, earning Austin a dominating 60.06% of the vote.

In 1873, he would run again, however dropped out during the primary. Supporters of him also voted for him in the 1875 Republican primary.

== Later life ==
Remaining in the public sphere after leaving the governor's office, Austin served as third auditor of the U.S. Treasury in Washington, as register of the U.S. Land Office in Fargo, North Dakota, and finally as a railroad commissioner. He devoted his last 16 years to travel and relaxation at his Lake Minnetonka home. He died in 1905 in Minneapolis, Minnesota.

Party political offices
Preceded by William Rainey Marshall	Republican nominee for Governor of Minnesota; 1869, 1871	Succeeded by Cushman Kellogg Davis
Political offices
Preceded by William Rainey Marshall	Governor of Minnesota; 1870–1874	Succeeded by Cushman Davis
