= Frederick Beever =

British soldier

The Reverend Frederick Beever
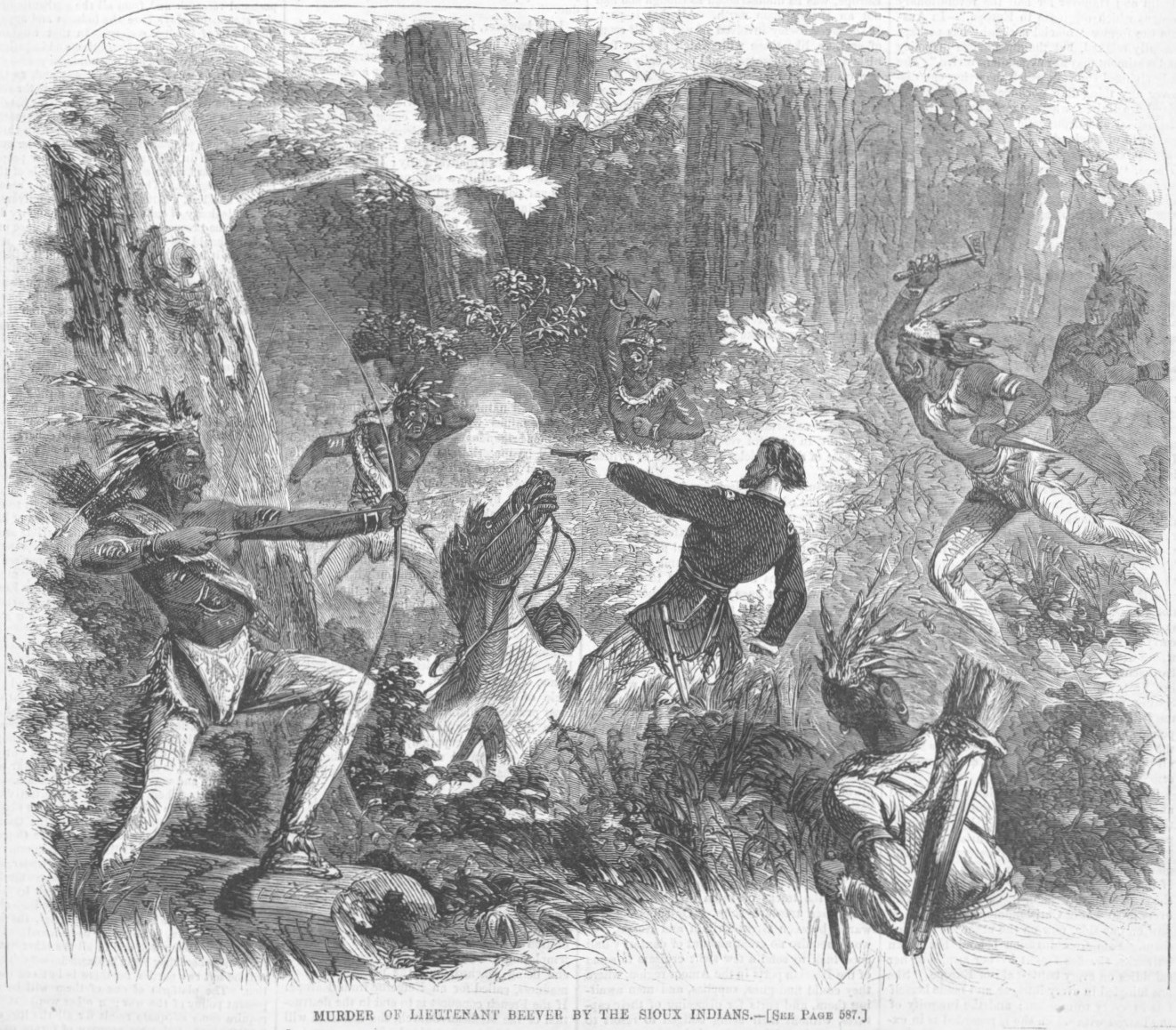
- A dramatization of Beever's death by Harper's Weekly
- Born: c. 1830; Llanfoist, Wales
- Died: July 29, 1863 Dakota Territory (now part of Burleigh County, North Dakota), U.S.
- Buried: Oakland Cemetery; St. Paul, Minnesota, U.S.
- Allegiance: British Empire; United States of America
- Branch: British Army (1855–1857); Union Army (1863–1863)
- Service years: 1855–1857; 1863–1863
- Rank: Second Lieutenant
- Conflicts: Crimean War; Indian Rebellion of 1857; American Indian Wars: Sibley's 1863 Campaign †
- Education: Jesus College, Oxford

Frederick John Holt Beever (c. 1830 – July 29, 1863), sometimes written as F. J. Holt Beever or Frederick Beaver, was a Welsh clergyman, nobleman, soldier, Freemason, and adventurer. Beever was the aide-de-camp of General Henry Hastings Sibley while serving in Union Army during Sibley's 1863 Campaign where he was killed in action. Beever is noted as being the first Freemason to be buried in North Dakota, his remains were later exhumed and reinterred at Oakland Cemetery in Saint Paul, Minnesota.

== Early life ==
Beever was born in Llanfoist in Wales around 1830, not much is known about his upbringing. Beever attended university at Jesus College, Oxford which he temporarily resigned from in 1852. Beever used his probationary period from Jesus College to travel to the Russian Empire.

== Military service and religious work ==
Beever served during the Crimean War from 1855 to 1856 where he was briefly on the staff of FitzRoy Somerset, 1st Baron Raglan, the commander of British forces in Crimea during the Siege of Sevastopol. Beever later served in India during Company rule in India and was present during the Sepoy Mutiny before returning to his studies at Jesus College. On his return to Jesus College Beever had acquired a Russian translation of The Pickwick Papers by Charles Dickens which was donated to the Bodleian Library. Shortly after returning to England Beever again took academic leave beginning in 1858, during this time Beever worked as an ordained clergyman for the Church of England at the British Embassy in Paris. Beever returned to his studies at Jesus College in 1859.

== Life in the United States ==
In the early 1860s Beever emigrated to the United States. While in the United States he quickly became acquainted with several notable American citizens including John Jacob Astor III and Hamilton Fish while living in New York City. While the American Civil War was still ongoing the outbreak of the Dakota War of 1862 fascinated Beever deeply, so much so that he traveled to the state of Minnesota in 1863 and rendered his services to Brigadier General Henry Hastings Sibley, the commander of Minnesota state forces.

== Indian Wars and death ==
Beever volunteered for service in the Union Army in 1863 on General Sibley's staff as an aide-de camp with the rank of Second Lieutenant. Harriet Bishop states in her 1864 book Dakota War Whoop that Beever traveled westward for his health and was seeking adventure and opportunity on the Great Plains. Bishop describes Beever as a "jovial, social man, brave energetic and reliable, and after "life's fitful fever'". Beever was present at the Battle of Big Mound and the Battle of Stony Lake in Dakota Territory.

On July 29, 1863, following the Battle of Stoney Lake Sibley gave Beever the verbal orders to "go ride to Col. McPhail - tell him not to pursue the enemy after dark, but to act discretionary as to a bivouac on the prairie". Beever was also ordered to retrieve Colonel William Crooks of the 6th Minnesota Infantry Regiment who was performing reconnaissance near the Apple Creek and have his regiment return to camp. Beever successfully relayed Sibley's orders to McPhail and Crooks, however, he did not return to Sibley's headquarters where his absence was noted by Sibley. The St. Paul Daily Press purports that Beever took the wrong trail while riding back to Sibley's camp when he was suddenly ambushed by the Dakota.

On July 30, 1863, Sibley ordered eleven companies under the command of Crooks to search for the body of Beever and another missing soldier, Private Nicholas Miller of Company K of the 6th Minnesota. Both Beever and Miller were found by Crooks later that day, both of which were mutilated and scalped, Beever having three arrows in his back and his horse shot through its head. A report by Harper's Weekly states that a portion of Beever's face was cut off with a tomahawk or knife. Clement Lounsberry notes in two separate sources that all three of Beever's revolvers were exhausted of ammunition signifying that Beaver attempted to fight back when ambushed by the Dakota. Likewise, Bishop mentions Beever had been carrying two pistols which were fired by Beever at the Dakota.

Beaver was originally buried in a temporary grave on a nearby ridge near the Missouri River which was used as a rifle pit for soldiers. Masonic rites were conducted during Beever's funeral and is noted as being the first Masonic funeral in what would become the state of North Dakota. Several years later in the 1870s Beever's body was exhumed and reinterred at Fort Snelling National Cemetery before being reinterred at Oakland Cemetery in Saint Paul, Minnesota where it still rests today.

== Legacy ==
One of the arrows which killed Beever is held within the collection of the Minnesota Historical Society.
