= 7th Minnesota Infantry Regiment =

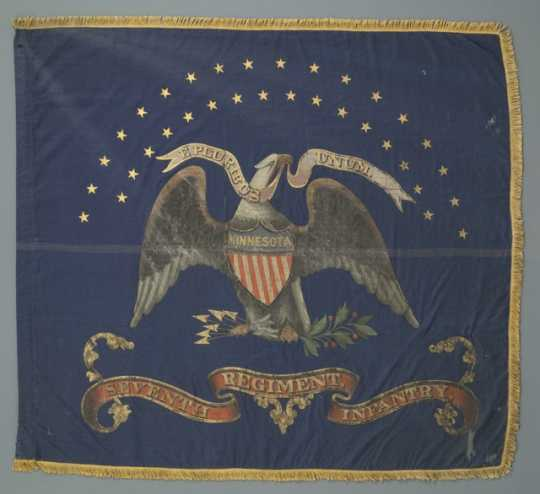
- 7th Minnesota Infantry Regiment Battle Flag
- Active: August 16, 1862, to August 16, 1865
- Country: United States
- Allegiance: Union
- Branch: United States Army
- Type: Infantry
- Engagements: American Civil War: Dakota War of 1862; Battle of Wood Lake; Sibley's 1863 Campaign; Battle of Big Mound; Battle of Dead Buffalo Lake; Battle of Stony Lake; Forrest's Defense of Mississippi; Battle of Tupelo; Price's Missouri Expedition; Battle of Westport; Franklin-Nashville Campaign; Battle of Nashville; Mobile Campaign; Battle of Spanish Fort; Battle of Fort Blakeley

Commanders
- Notable commanders: Stephen Miller; William R. Marshall

The 7th Minnesota Infantry Regiment was an infantry regiment in the Union Army that served in the Western Theater of the American Civil War.

== Service ==
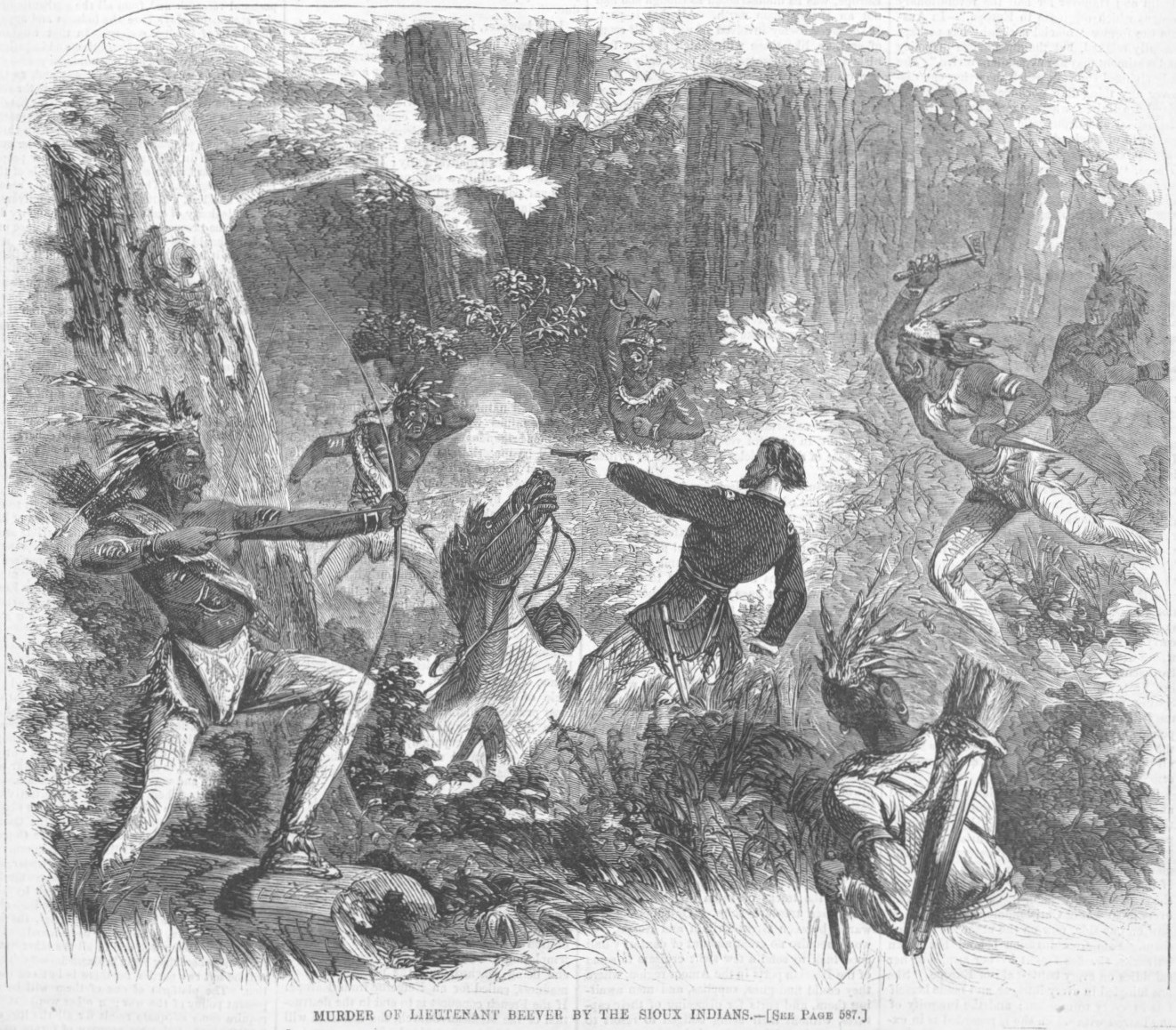
An artist's depiction of the death of Sibley's aide Lt. Frederick Beever of the 7th Minnesota Infantry after the Battle of Stony Lake On July 29, 1863.

The 7th Minnesota Infantry Regiment was mustered into Federal service at Camp Release, Fort Snelling, and St. Peter, Minnesota, between August 16 and October 30, 1862. In August Companies A, B, F, G, and H marched to relieve the embattled Fort Ridgely. They would see action at the Battle of Birch Coulee and at the Battle of Wood Lake in September. Following the surrender of the Sioux, the Seventh spent the winter in Minnesota. The next summer, they accompanied Colonel Henry Sibley against the native peoples in Dakota Territory during Sibley's 1863 Campaign. They fought in the Battle of Big Mound in July, 1863. They returned to Minnesota to be sent south to St Louis in October for the winter. Once spring arrived, the regiment moved east to Paducah, Kentucky. From there, it headed south into Tennessee and by the end of June were in northern Mississippi. In July, they fought Confederate forces in the Battle of Tupelo. They pursued Sterling Price but did not engage his troops. They arrived in Nashville that winter and contributed to the Union victory at the Battle of Nashville. After the battle, they moved further south into Alabama for the Battle of Spanish Fort, one of the last battles on the Western theater. The war ended and by July the Seventh was heading north for home. The Regiment was mustered out in St. Paul, Minnesota, on August 16, 1865.

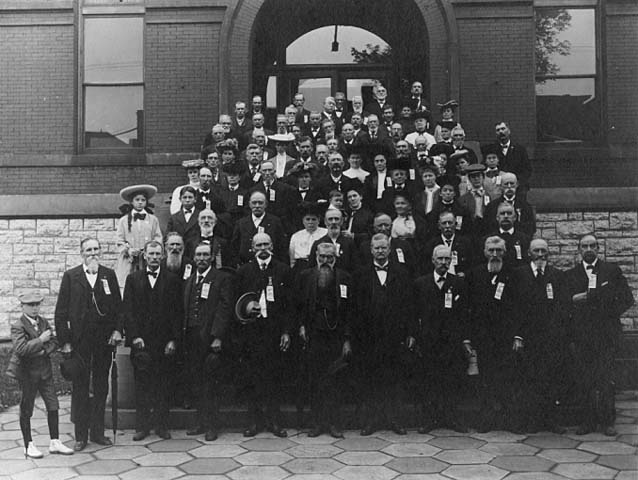
Veterans of the 7th Minnesota, taken in 1905.

== Casualties ==
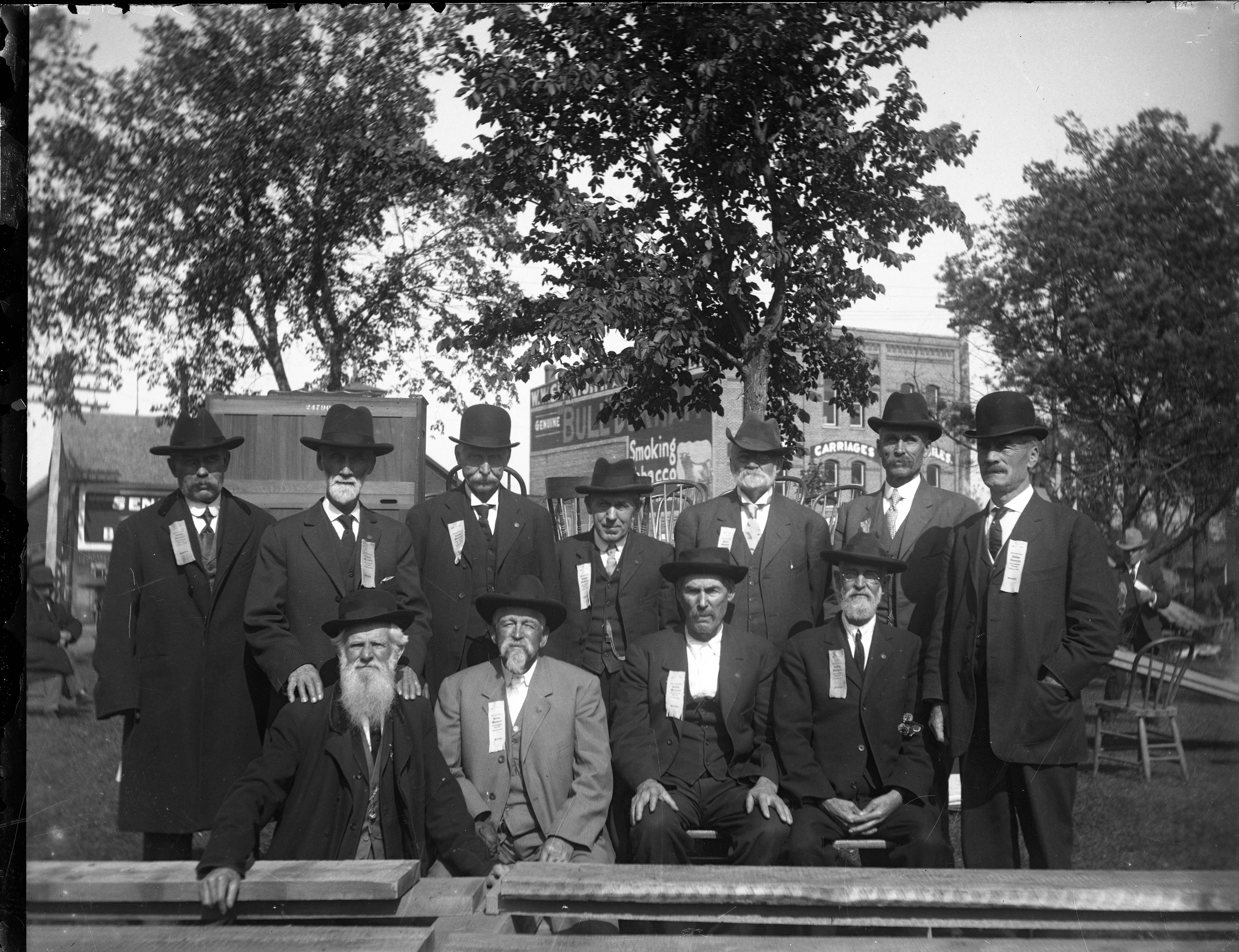
Veterans of the 7th Minnesota Infantry Regiment during a reunion in 1905.

The 7th Minnesota Infantry suffered 2 officers and 31 enlisted men killed in action or who later died of their wounds, plus another 138 enlisted men who died of disease, for a total of 171 fatalities.

== Colonels ==
Both of the 7th regiment's commanders were later elected governor of Minnesota:

- Colonel Stephen Miller – August 24, 1862, to November 6, 1863.
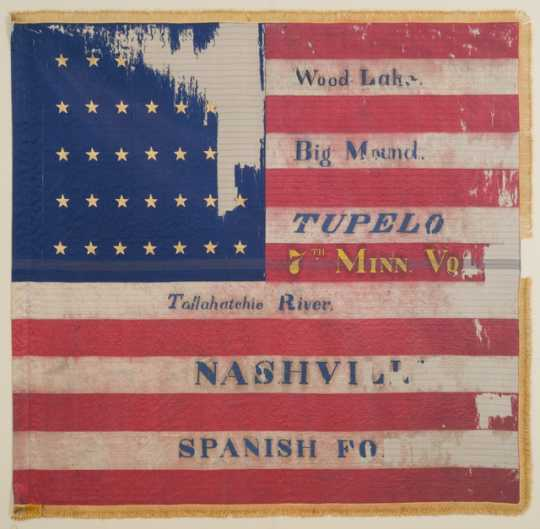
- 7th Minnesota Infantry Regiment National Flag. Minnesota Historical Society.
  Colonel William Rainey Marshall – November 6, 1863, to August 16, 1865.

== See also ==
- List of Minnesota Civil War Units
