= Battle of Whitestone Hill =

Battle of the American Civil War

Coordinates: 46.1697°N 98.8557°W

Battle of White Stone Hill
- Part of Sully's Expedition (1863–1864), Sioux Wars, American Civil War
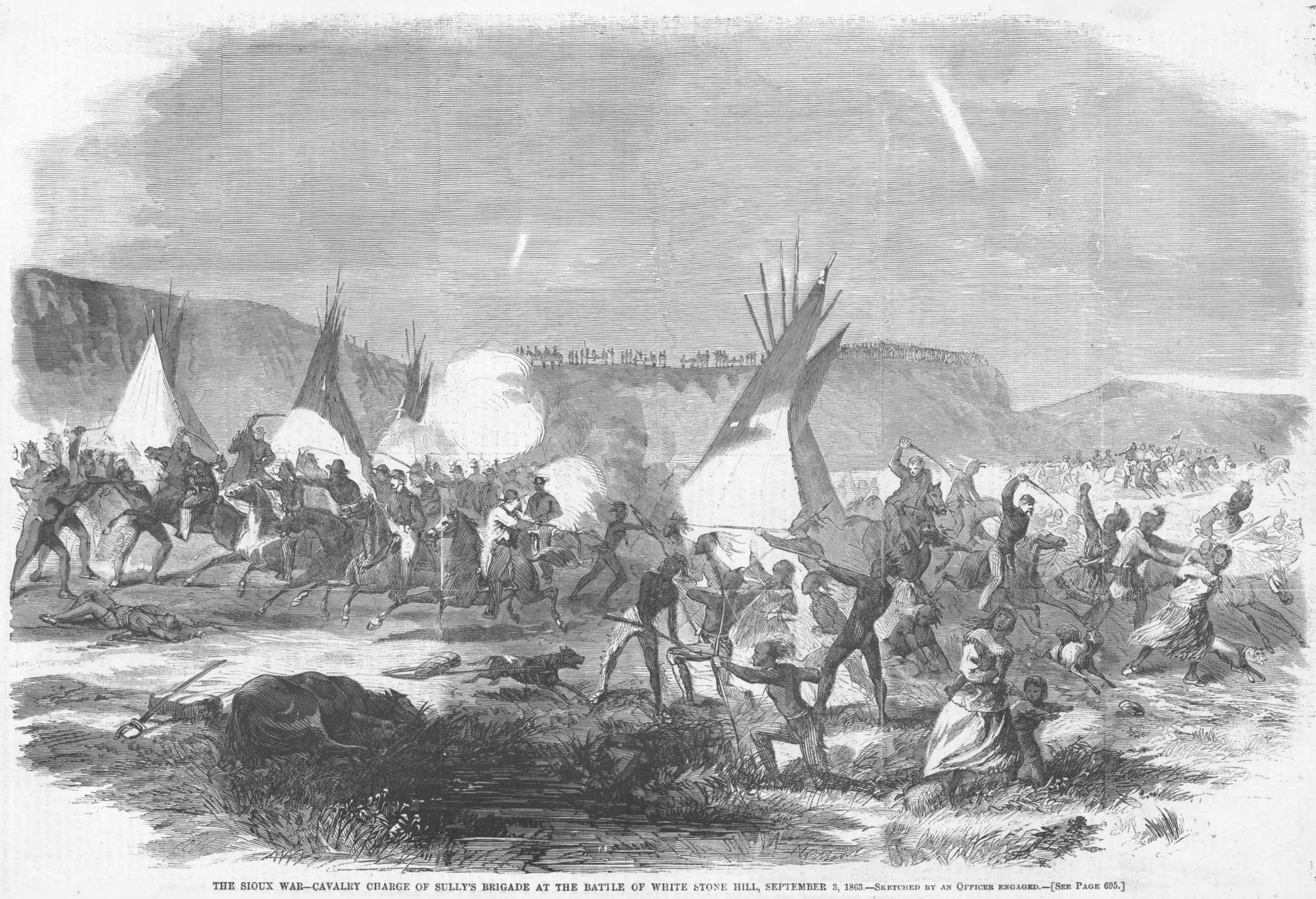
- The Battle of White Stone Hill from Harper's Weekly, October 31, 1863
Date	September 3, 1863 – September 5, 1863
Location	Dakota Territory; Present-day Dickey County, North Dakota
Result	United States victory

Belligerents
United States of America	Yanktonai, Santee, and Teton (Hunkpapa and Sihasapa) Sioux

Commanders and leaders
Alfred Sully	Inkpaduta

Strength
1200 soldiers; 600 to 700 engaged	600 to 1,500 warriors; 2,000 to 3,000 women and children present

Casualties and losses
22 killed, 38 wounded	~200 killed and wounded, including women and children 156 prisoners

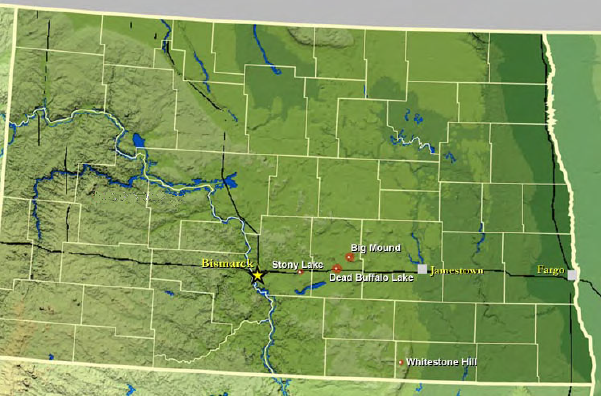
Map of the Operations Against the Sioux in North Dakota

The Battle of Whitestone Hill (known also as Whitestone Hill Massacre by the Dakota) was a battle of the Sioux Wars in 1863 in the Dakota Territory as punishment against the Sioux in the aftermath of the Dakota War of 1862. From September 3-5, 1863, Brigadier General Alfred Sully led U.S. Army troops against a village of Yanktonai, Santee, and Teton (Lakota) Sioux. The reported casualties vary, but U.S. Army troops killed somewhere between 150 and 300 Sioux and captured between 150 and 250 Sioux, including women and children, and they suffered approximately 22 killed and 38 wounded.

== Background ==
In the Dakota War of 1862, a faction of the Santee Dakota, or Sioux, in Minnesota rose up in rebellion against the United States because of the non-payment by the U.S. government to the Sioux of food and money as agreed to by treaties. The Sioux killed more than 600 whites, mostly unarmed civilians. The Sioux were defeated, the leaders of the rebellion executed, and, in April 1863, nearly all Sioux, whether participants in the war or not, were forcibly expelled or ordered to leave Minnesota and Sioux lands were confiscated. This caused about 4,000 Santee to flee from Minnesota to Dakota Territory where they united with other elements of the Yanktonai, Yankton, and Lakota or Teton Sioux. Sioux warriors continued to carry out small-scale raids on civilian and military targets in Minnesota.

In mid-1863, the United States Army under General John Pope in Minnesota mounted two large military expeditions against the Sioux in eastern Dakota Territory. The objectives of the expeditions were to prevent a renewal of the 1862 war, promote white settlement in the eastern Dakotas, and protect access to the Montana goldfields via the Missouri River. Brigadier General Henry Hastings Sibley commanded one of the two prongs of the operation. He led 2,000 soldiers overland from Minnesota to the Missouri River, fighting three battles in July with the Sioux at Big Mound, Dead Buffalo Lake, and Stony Lake. Although Sibley's men did not inflict heavy casualties, they pushed the Sioux to the western side of the Missouri River and destroyed much of their property including winter supplies of jerky and many of their tipis.

The second prong of the operation was led by Sully who was supposed to ascend the Missouri River with 1,200 men, rendezvous with Sibley, and crush the Sioux between the two forces. Because of low water in the river, Sully was delayed in ascending the Missouri in steamboats. When Sully arrived in the vicinity of present-day Bismarck, North Dakota in mid-August, Sibley had already returned to Minnesota. Sully's 1,200 men included the 6th Iowa Cavalry, commanded by Colonel David Wilson, the 2nd Nebraska Cavalry, commanded by Colonel Robert Furnas, plus eight mountain howitzers, scouts and a wagon train. Sully's men were armed with long-range rifles, rather than the usual cavalry carbines, which gave them a decided advantage over the Sioux, mostly armed with muskets, shotguns, and bows and arrows.

Meanwhile, some of the Sioux Sibley had chased west across the Missouri River had returned to the east of the river to replenish their winter supplies of buffalo meat. Sully searched for the Indians toward the southeast On September 3, Sully found numerous remains of recently killed buffalo near a lake and that afternoon his scout, Frank LaFramboise, a mixed-blood Santee, reported a village of 400 lodges 10 miles ahead. LaFramboise was captured briefly by a party of Sioux warriors, but released, a sign perhaps that the Sioux were not looking for a battle. Sully ordered his advance force, a battalion of the Sixth Iowa numbering 300 men under Major A. E. House to surround the encampment and prevent the Indians from leaving. He left four companies to guard his supply train and then advanced with his main force at a gallop covering the 10 miles in one hour.

While Major House and his battalion of the Sixth Iowa were scouting the Indian camp and waiting for Sibley to come forward with additional soldiers, a delegation from the Sioux advanced with a white flag constructed from a flour sack, claimed to be peaceful and only interested in hunting, and offered to surrender several of their chiefs. House, lacking instructions, demanded that the whole camp of Indians surrender unconditionally. He suspected that the Indians were stalling so the women would have time to pack up the camp and escape. House was likewise stalling until reinforcements arrived.

Yanktonai, including the Cuthead band, were probably the most populous of Sioux peoples in the encampment which also contained Santee, Hunkpapa (possibly including a rising leader named Sitting Bull), and Sihasapa or Blackfoot Sioux. Sully believed the number of warriors in the encampment to be about 1,500. That seems exaggerated. Four hundred lodges with 5 to 10 persons per lodge would house 2,000 to 4,000 persons, including 500 to 1,000 adult men, some women, children, and aged probably having been left behind for safety west of the Missouri River. The Sioux claimed they had 950 men in the battle.

== Battle ==
Sully arrived about 6 p.m. on the ridge overlooking the large, much dispersed Indian encampment. He estimated that only 600 to 700 of his men were present. He saw the Sioux packing up their tipis and departing and concluded that the Indians were more inclined to flee than fight. Sully's objective was to "corral" the Indians and he deployed his force to cut off their escape routes and to advance on the village. He sent Colonel Wilson and the 6th Iowa to his right flank and Colonel Furnas and the 2nd Nebraska to his left to occupy several ravines which offered the Sioux an opportunity to conceal themselves from the soldiers and escape. Covered on both flanks, Sully with three companies and artillery advanced into the encampment without serious opposition. Two chiefs, Little Head and Big Head, and about 150 of their followers surrendered. Because of the close quarters and chaotic nature of the battlefield, Sully was unable to use his artillery.

Many of the Sioux were caught between the Sixth Iowa and the Second Nebraska, with the Iowa soldiers advancing on foot and pushing the Sioux into the arms of the Nebraskans who exchanged fire with the Indians at a range of only 60 yards. With darkness approaching, Colonel Wilson of the Sixth Iowa ordered an ill-advised mounted charge with one battalion. However, in his haste he failed to order some of his men to load their weapons and heavy fire from the Sioux caused the cavalry horses to bolt and the charge to break down. The battalion fell back and took up defensive positions on foot.

On the left, Colonel Furnas also withdrew his Nebraskans to a defensive position, fearing friendly fire and losing control of his soldiers in the increasing darkness. The soldiers spent a harrowing night, "the Indians pillaged the battlefield and scalped the dead soldiers; squaws were screaming and wailing" and a wounded soldier screamed for help but the soldiers thought he was a decoy to lure them out of their defenses. They found him next morning, still alive but dying from lacerations inflicted by the Indians. The Sioux escaped in the darkness.

The next morning the camp was empty of Indians except for the dead and a few lost children and women. Sully sent out patrols to attempt to locate the fleeing Sioux but they found few Indians. Sully ordered all the Indian property abandoned in the camp to be burned. This included 300 tipis and 400,000 to 500,000 pounds of dried buffalo meat, the winter supplies of the Indians and the product of 1,000 butchered buffalo. On September 5, Sully's soldiers had another encounter with the Sioux. A patrol of 27 soldiers commanded by Lt. Charles W. Hall encountered an estimated 300 Sioux about fifteen miles from Whitestone Hill. The Indians chased the soldiers back to Sibley's camp, killing six and wounding one.

Sully's casualties were approximately 22 killed and 38 wounded. No reliable estimates of Sioux killed and wounded are available, with estimates ranging from 100 to 300, including women and children. Captured Sioux totaled 156, including 32 adult men. Indian sources often call Whitestone Hill a massacre with Sully attacking a peaceful camp, killing a large number of women and children, and concur that Sully's band deliberately destroyed substantial food supplies, equipment, and living shelters. In his report, Sully stated that, "I can safely say that I gave them one of the most severe punishments that the Indians have ever received." One of Sully's interpreters, Samuel J. Brown, a mixed-blood Sioux, said "it was a perfect massacre" and "lamentable to hear how those women and children was massacred." The contrary view is that Sully had a "long demonstrated concern for the Indians and a spotless record of honor and integrity." Despite the deliberate targeting and execution of children and infants, the substantial casualties of the soldiers demonstrate, according to Micheal Clodfelter, that Whitestone Hill was a battle, not a massacre.

== Aftermath ==
Due to the poor condition of his horses and mules and his lack of supplies, Sully was unable to pursue the Sioux. He left Whitestone Hill on September 6 and marched his men to Fort Pierre in present-day South Dakota. Nearby, he built another fort, called Fort Sully, where some of his men were garrisoned for the winter. This led to a renewed operation in 1864 against the Sioux and the Battle of Killdeer Mountain. While Sully's expedition impoverished some of the Sioux it did not achieve its objective of ending the Indian threat in the eastern Dakotas.

LaDonna Brave Bull Allard, a Standing Rock Sioux tribal historian, states to the contrary that after the incident U.S. forces continued to pursue, harass, and kill the Sioux for several days.

About 600 Sioux, mostly Santee, took refuge in Canada after the battle. They were followed by 3,000 more in 1864. Minnesota expelled all Sioux, including those who had not participated in the Dakota War of 1862 and also expelled the friendly Winnebago. The State confiscated and sold all Sioux land in the state. Soon, only 25 Santee, steadfast friends of the whites, were allowed to live in the state.

== Federal units involved ==
- Department of the Northwest - District of Iowa (including the Territory of Dakota): Brigadier General Alfred Sully
  - 6th Iowa Cavalry: Colonel David S. Wilson
  - 2nd Nebraska Cavalry: Colonel Robert W. Furnas
  - Company I, 7th Iowa Cavalry: Captain Andrew Jackson Millard

== Whitestone Hill State Historic Site ==
The State Historical Society of North Dakota protects a portion of the battlefield as Whitestone Hill State Historic Site. The site includes a small museum about the battle, two monuments, one honoring the Indian dead and a second commemorating the soldiers who died in the battle, and a picnic area. The site is open seasonally. The nonprofit Whitestone Hill Battlefield Historical Society (WHBHS) partners with the State Historical Society of North Dakota to support preservation and interpretation at the Whitestone Hill battlefield.

== See also ==
- History of North Dakota
- Plains Indians Wars
- List of battles fought in North Dakota
