= Governor Marshall =

Governor Marshall may refer to:

- Thomas R. Marshall (1854–1925), 27th Governor of Indiana
- William Rainey Marshall (1825–1896), 5th Governor of Minnesota
