= Dead Buffalo Lake =

- Location within North Dakota Location within the United States
- Location: Kidder County, North Dakota, United States
- Coordinates: 46.90293°N 99.77142°W
- Type: Natural lake
- Surface elevation: 1,735 ft (529 m)

Dead Buffalo Lake is a natural lake located in Kidder County, North Dakota, United States. The lake lies at an elevation of 1,735 feet (529 meters) above mean sea level.

== Historical significance ==
Dead Buffalo Lake was the site of the Battle of Dead Buffalo Lake on July 26, 1863, during the Sioux Wars. The battle involved United States forces under the command of Brigadier General Henry Hastings Sibley and a coalition of Santee, Yankton, Yanktonai, and Teton Sioux warriors.

== Background ==
Following the Dakota War of 1862, thousands of Dakota Sioux fled westward. By the summer of 1863, over 4,000 Sioux had gathered in the area that is now Kidder County, North Dakota. General Sibley launched a military campaign to pursue and engage these groups, leading an expedition of over 2,000 troops, including infantry, cavalry, and artillery units.

== The battle ==
On July 26, 1863, Sibley's forces reached Dead Buffalo Lake where Sioux warriors attempted to block the advance of the U.S. military to protect their families retreating westward. The U.S. troops successfully defended their supply trains against Sioux attacks during the confrontation. The battle marked a significant episode in the U.S. military's campaigns against the Sioux during this period.

== Geography ==
Dead Buffalo Lake is located at 46.90293°N 99.77142°W within Kidder County in central North Dakota. It lies at an elevation of 1,735 feet (529 meters) above sea level. The lake is part of the Prairie Pothole Region, characterized by numerous small glacial lakes and wetlands.

== See also ==
- Battle of Dead Buffalo Lake
- List of lakes in North Dakota
