= 1865 Minnesota gubernatorial election =

- November 7, 1865
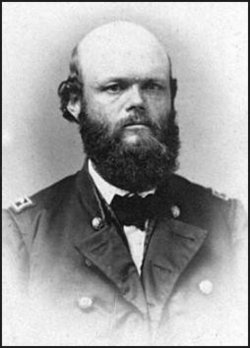

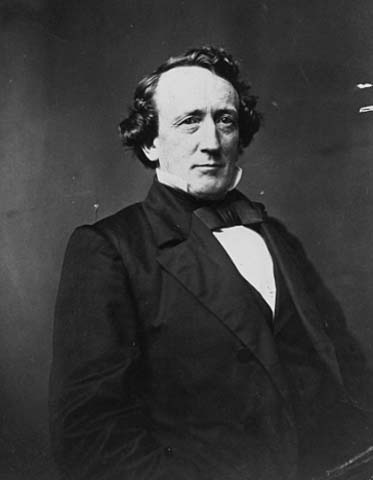
Nominee	William Rainey Marshall	Henry Mower Rice
Party	Republican	Democratic
Popular vote	17,318	13,842
Percentage	55.58%	44.42%
- County results: Marshall: 50–60% 60–70% 70–80% 80–90% 90–100% Rice: 50–60% 60–70% 70–80% 90–100% Unknown/no vote
Governor before election
Stephen Miller
Republican
Elected Governor
William Rainey Marshall
Republican

The 1865 Minnesota gubernatorial election was held on November 7, 1865, to elect the governor of Minnesota. Incumbent Stephen Miller did not seek a second term.

== Candidates ==
- Henry Mower Rice, former senator (Democrat)
- William Rainey Marshall, Civil War veteran (Republican)

== Campaigns ==
The Republican State Convention took place on September 6, 1865. It took 22 ballots to elect Marshall as its nominee. The other candidates were John T. Averill and Charles Duncan Gilfillan. Averill led the first two ballots, and Marshall led in all subsequent ones.

The Democratic State Convention took place on August 16. It was described as a "Copperhead Fizzle". The convention opened with no leading candidates, simply choosing them from among themselves once there, with no pre-existing plan or campaigns. Once nominated, Rice's campaign struggled to convince the public that he was loyal to the Union and had no confederate sympathies.

== Results ==
Minnesota gubernatorial election, 1865
Party	Candidate	Votes	%
Republican	William Rainey Marshall	17,318	55.58
Democratic	Henry Mower Rice	13,842	44.42
Total votes		31,160	100
Republican hold			
