= Joseph Bowron =

American politician and Wisconsin pioneer (1809–1868)

Member of the Wisconsin State Assembly from the St. Croix–La Pointe district
- In office June 13, 1848 – January 7, 1850
- Preceded by: William Rainey Marshall
- Succeeded by: John S. Watrous

Personal details
- Born: August 1, 1809 Essex County, New York, U.S.
- Died: April 10, 1868 (aged 58)
- Party: Democratic
- Spouses: Celia Partridge (m. 1849; died 1852); Rosanna Partridge (m. 1854; died 1863)
- Children: at least 2

Joseph Bowron (August 1, 1809 – April 10, 1868) was a member of the Wisconsin State Assembly representing St. Croix and La Pointe counties during the first two sessions of the Wisconsin Legislature.

== Biography ==
Bowron was born in 1809 in Essex County, New York. His parents were English American immigrants, having previously resided at Newcastle upon Tyne. When he was five years old, his mother died and he was sent to live with his aunt. She raised him until age 19, when he went to work in Lower Canada.

He later moved to Illinois, to work on the Illinois and Michigan Canal, then to St. Louis. In 1841, he moved to St. Croix Falls, Wisconsin Territory, where he worked in the lumber industry as a clerk, log scaler, and mill superintendent.

In 1848, Wisconsin was admitted to the United States as the 30th state. An election was held to select the 1st Wisconsin Legislature, and Bowron ran as a Democratic candidate. He was defeated by William Rainey Marshall—who would later become Governor of Minnesota—but Bowron contested Marshall's eligibility for office on the grounds that he resided on the wrong side of the new state boundary. The Legislature agreed with Bowron's challenge, and Bowron was seated as the representative of St. Croix and La Pointe counties in the 1st session of the Wisconsin State Assembly. Bowron was subsequently re-elected to serve in the 2nd Wisconsin Legislature.

He moved to Hudson, Wisconsin, in 1848, and married in 1849. His first wife was Celia Partridge, of Columbia County, Wisconsin, but she died just three years later. He then married Rosanna Partridge in 1854, she died in 1863.

Bowron died in 1868, leaving two children, who subsequently moved to Kansas.

Wisconsin State Assembly
Preceded by William Rainey Marshall	Member of the Wisconsin State Assembly from the St. Croix–La Pointe district June 13, 1848 – January 7, 1850	Succeeded by John S. Watrous
