= List of battles fought in North Dakota =

This is an incomplete list of military and other armed confrontations that have occurred within the boundaries of the modern US State of North Dakota since European contact. The region was part of the Viceroyalty of New Spain from 1535 to 1679, New France from 1679 to 1803, and part of the United States of America 1803–present.

The Plains Indian Wars directly affected the region during westward expansion. The Dakota War of 1862 (also known as the Sioux Uprising) involved eastern Dakota Native Americans, the armed conflicts of this war were fought in Minnesota, their former lands. The aftermath of that war was the pursuit of several eastern Dakota tribes in both South Dakota and North Dakota.

== Battles ==
Name	Date	Location	War	Campaign	Dead	Belligerents
Battle of Grand Coteau	July 13–14, 1851	near modern Minot			16–81	Métis bison hunters vs Yanktonai Sioux
Battle of Big Mound	July 24–25, 1863	modern Kidder County	Sioux Wars	Sibley's Expedition	12+	United States vs. Santee, Yankton, Yanktonai, & Teton Sioux
Battle of Dead Buffalo Lake	July 26, 1863	modern Kidder County	Sioux Wars	Sibley's Expedition	16 (est.)	United States vs. Teton & Santee Sioux
Battle of Stony Lake	July 28, 1863	modern Burleigh County	Sioux Wars	Sibley's Expedition	5+	United States vs. Santee, Teton, Yankton & Yanktonai Sioux
Battle of Whitestone Hill	September 3–5, 1863	modern Dickey County	Sioux Wars		222+	United States vs. Yanktonai, Santee, & Teton Sioux
Battle of Killdeer Mountain	July 28–29, 1864	modern Dunn County	Sioux Wars	Sully's Expedition (1863–1864)	ca. 155	United States vs. Teton, Yanktonai, & Santee Sioux
Battle of the Badlands	August 7–9, 1864	between modern Medora & Sentinel Butte	Sioux Wars	Sully's Expedition (1863–1864)	ca. 100	United States vs. Hunkpapa, Sans Arc, Miniconjou, & Yanktonai

== See also ==
- History of North Dakota
- Plains Indians Wars
