= 1st Minnesota Cavalry Regiment =

- The standard 35 star civil war Cavalry guidon.
- Active: October 1862 to December 1863
- Country: United States
- Allegiance: Union
- Branch: Cavalry
- Nicknames: Mounted Rangers; Renville Rangers (Company I only)
- Engagements: American Civil War: Sibley's Expedition Against the Sioux; Battle of Big Mound; Battle of Dead Buffalo Lake; Battle of Stony Lake

Commanders
- Colonel: Samuel McPhail
- Lieutenant Colonel: William Pfaender
- Major: John H. Parker
- Major: Soloman (Salmon) A. Buell
- Major: Oren Tracy Hayes

The 1st Minnesota Cavalry Regiment, also known as the Mounted Rangers, was a Minnesota USV mounted infantry regiment that served in the Union Army during the American Civil War.

The companies of the regiment were initially mustered in between October and December 1862 at St. Cloud, St. Peter and Fort Snelling for three month's service which was extended to a year. Thirty to forty men from the Renville Rangers militia volunteered at Fort Snelling when their militia was decommissioned by joining the company raised from Faribault County. The Minnesota Mounted Rangers served entirely in Minnesota and the Dakota Territory in response the hostile Santee Sioux. The men were mustered out between October and December 1863.

== Service history ==
Organized at St. Cloud, St. Peters and Fort Snelling, Minnesota from October 9 to December 30, 1862. Organized for frontier duty against Indians. 1st Battalion engaged in frontier duty till June, 1863. Sibley's Expedition against Indians in Dakota Territory June 16-September 14. Battle of Big Mound, D. T., July 24. Dead Buffalo Lake July 26. Stony Lake July 28. Missouri River July 28-30. 1st Battalion on duty at Fort Ripley, and rest of Regiment at Fort Snelling, Minn., till December. Mustered out October 20 to December 7, 1863.

1st Minnesota Cavalry Regiment Company Organization.
Company	Moniker	Primary Place of Recruitment	Earliest Captain
A		Hennepin County, Houston County, Dakota County and Rice County	Eugene M. Wilson
B		Nicollet County, Blue Earth County, and Faribault County	Horace Austin
C		Anoka County and other Minnesota counties	Thomas G. Henderson
D		Stearns County	Oscar Taylor
E		Nicollet County, Blue Earth County and Le Sueur County	Eugene Saint Julien Cox
F		Fillmore County and other Minnesota counties	Joseph Daniels
G		Ramsey County, Dakota County and Houston County	Joseph Anderson
H		Rice County, Freeborn County and Blue Earth County	George S. Ruble
I	Renville Rangers	Olmsted County and Fillmore County	Dwight I. Allen
K		Faribault County and Nicollet County	Norman B. Hyatt
L		Brown County	Jacob Nix
M		Chisago County, Dodge County, and Mower County	James Richard Starkey

== Battles and campaigns ==
- Sibley's Expedition against Indians in Dakota Territory, June 16 to September 14, 1863.
- Battle of Big Mound, July 24, 1863.
- Battle of Dead Buffalo Lake, July 26, 1863.
- Battle of Stony Lake, July 28, 1863.
- Operations along the Missouri River, July 28 to 30, 1863.

== Colonels ==
- Samuel McPhail - October 1862 to December 1863.

== Casualties and total strength ==
The 1st Minnesota Cavalry lost two officers and four enlisted men killed in action or died of wounds received in battle. An additional 31 enlisted men died of disease. Total fatalities were 37.

== Notable people ==
- Samuel McPhail: McPahil was the Colonel and commander of the regiment. Born in Kentucky, McPhail was a veteran of the Mexican–American War and was an early settler of Renville County, Minnesota. During the Dakota War of 1862 McPhail led a cavalry relief column to rescue Captain Hiram P. Grant, Captain Joseph Anderson, and Major Joseph R. Brown who had been ambushed by Little Crow in the Battle of Birch Coulee.
- Jacob Nix: Nix served as the Captain of Company L from December 28, 1862 to December 1863 when he was transferred to the 2nd Minnesota Cavalry Regiment where he then commanded Company G.
- William Pfaender: Mayor, postmaster, and State Representative from New Ulm, Minnesota. Pfaender first served as the Lieutenant colonel of the regiment until his transfer to the 2nd Minnesota Cavalry Regiment.
- John Hauenstein: A renowned brewer from New Ulm, Minnesota. He was later the founder and operator of the Hauenstein Brewing Company. Hauenstein served as a 2nd Lieutenant in Company L under Captain Jacob Nix.
- Eugene M. Wilson: A lawyer and Democratic politician who served in various legal and political offices in Minnesota including as a member of Congress and as the fifth and seventh mayor of Minneapolis.
- Eugene Saint Julien Cox: Minnesota politician and lawyer. Cox served in the Minnesota House of Representatives in 1873 as a Democrat and then served in the Minnesota State Senate in 1874 and 1875.
- Horace Austin: Republican politician and the 6th Governor of Minnesota.

== See also ==
- List of Minnesota Civil War Units
