= William Rainey Marshall =

American politician (1825–1896)

Brigadier General William Rainey Marshall
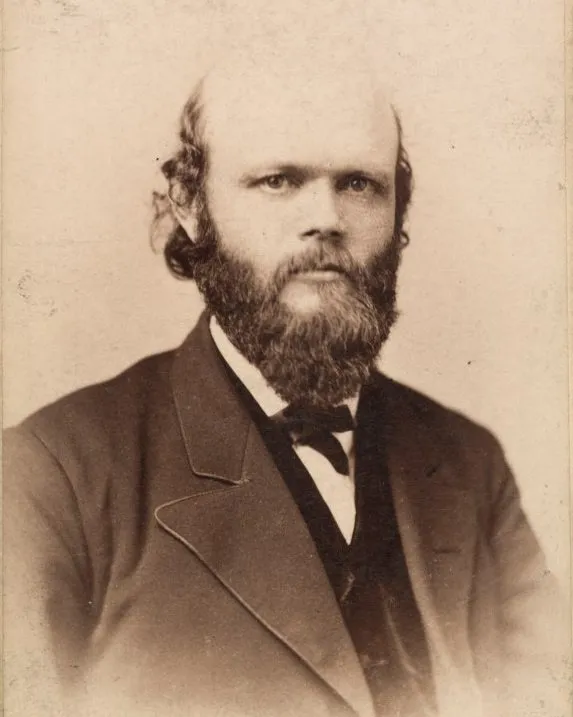
- Marshall while Governor

5th Governor of Minnesota
- In office January 8, 1866 – January 9, 1870
- Lieutenant: Thomas H. Armstrong
- Preceded by: Stephen Miller
- Succeeded by: Horace Austin

Personal details
- Born: October 17, 1825 Columbia, Missouri, U.S.
- Died: January 8, 1896 (aged 70) Pasadena, California, U.S.
- Resting place: Oakland Cemetery, Saint Paul, Minnesota
- Party: Republican
- Spouse: Abby Langford
- Profession: Banker, farmer

Military service
- Allegiance: Union Army
- Branch/service: United States Army
- Years of service: 1862 - 1865
- Rank: Colonel; Brevet Brigadier General
- Unit: 8th Minnesota Infantry Regiment (initially); 7th Minnesota Infantry Regiment
- Commands: 7th Minnesota Infantry Regiment
- Battles/wars: American Civil War: Dakota War of 1862; Battle of Wood Lake; Sibley's Expedition Against the Sioux; Battle of Big Mound; Battle of Dead Buffalo Lake; Battle of Stony Lake; Forrest's Defense of Mississippi; Battle of Tupelo; Price's Missouri Expedition; Battle of Westport; Franklin-Nashville Campaign; Battle of Nashville; Mobile Campaign; Battle of Spanish Fort; Battle of Fort Blakeley

William Rainey Marshall (October 17, 1825 – January 8, 1896 (Note: Newspaper articles reporting Gov. Marshall's death on April 4, 1895 were in error. See this article's discussion page.)) was an American politician. He was the fifth governor of Minnesota from January 8, 1866, to January 9, 1870, and was a member of the Republican party. He served as the Colonel of the 7th Minnesota Volunteer Infantry Regiment during the American Civil War (1861–1865) and Dakota War of 1862 (1862 - 1864), eventually achieving the rank of brevet Brigadier General.

== Life and Early Career ==
He was born in Columbia, Missouri. Marshall first settled in Illinois and Wisconsin, where he mined for lead and surveyed land. He was elected to serve in the Wisconsin State Assembly in the 1st Wisconsin Legislature in 1848 as a Democrat, but his seat was successfully contested by Joseph Bowron, because his home in St. Croix Falls was on the west (Minnesota Territory) side of the new state line. In 1849 he crossed the St. Croix River to settle in St. Paul, soon home of his fledgling hardware business. He served a term in the first Minnesota territorial legislature, and his reputation grew when he served as chairman of the convention that founded the state's Republican Party. While in Minnesota, he continued his work as a surveyor, notably surveying the townsite of St. Anthony.

The one-time banker, dairy farmer, stock-raiser, and newspaper publisher volunteered to fight in both the Civil War and the Dakota War of 1862. He enlisted as a private in the 8th Minnesota and was quickly appointed lieutenant colonel of the 7th Minnesota on August 28, 1862. He considered running for Governor in 1863, but decided against it. He fought in many of the battles of the Dakota War being promoted to colonel of his regiment on November 6, 1863. Marshall and his regiment were transferred to Andrew Jackson Smith's command in Missouri and took part in the pursuit of Sterling Price. Smith's command was attached to George H. Thomas' army outside Nashville. When Colonel Sylvester G. Hill was killed the first day of the battle of Nashville, Colonel Marshall took command of Hill's brigade and led it throughout the rest of the battle. He continued in brigade command when transferred to Mobile, Alabama, to take part in the Battle of Fort Blakeley. Colonel Marshall was brevetted brigadier general of volunteers, dated March 13, 1865.

On September 6, 1865, Marshall was nominated for Governor of Minnesota by the Republican National Convention. It took a historic 22 ballots to elect Marshall as its nominee. The other candidates were John T. Averill and Charles Duncan Gilfillan. Averill led the first two ballots, and Marshall led in all subsequent ones.

== Governor ==
Marshall won the 1865 and 1867 gubernatorial elections. As governor, he repeatedly urged passage of a black suffrage amendment. After defeating it twice, the legislature finally adopted the amendment and inspired Marshall to declare that the "free young state of Minnesota" is "now altogether free." The amendment was passed in 1868.

During William Marshall's administration, his adoptive state experienced a post-Civil-War surge of growth and development: its population doubled to 350,000, its railroad mileage quadrupled, and its commercial endeavors flourished.

== Later life ==
After leaving office, Marshall remained active in both the private and public sectors as an attorney, banker, and as a railroad and land commissioner. He was a partner in a law firm with Jude Kerr and Robertson Howard while residing in St. Paul, but subsequent commercial ventures faltered, as did his health. He moved to California in 1894 and died there two years later, in Pasadena on January 8, 1896. He was buried at Oakland Cemetery in Saint Paul. He is listed as one of the few politicians to be an adherent of Swedenborgianism.

In Minnesota, Marshall County and the city of Marshall were both named after him.

== Notes ==
Party political offices
Preceded by Stephen Miller	Republican nominee for Governor of Minnesota; 1865, 1867	Succeeded by Horace Austin
Political offices
Preceded by Stephen Miller	Governor of Minnesota; 1866–1870	Succeeded by Horace Austin
