= Alta Vista Township, Lincoln County, Minnesota =

Alta Vista Township, Minnesota
- Township
- Location within the state of Minnesota Alta Vista Township, Minnesota (the United States)
- Coordinates: 44°35′N 96°9′W
- Country: United States
- State: Minnesota
- County: Lincoln

Area
  - Total: 36.5 sq mi (94.6 km^{2})
  - Land: 36.5 sq mi (94.6 km^{2})
  - Water: 0 sq mi (0.0 km^{2})
- Elevation: 1,322 ft (403 m)

Population (2000)
  - Total: 212
  - Density: 5.7/sq mi (2.2/km^{2})
- Time zone: UTC-6 (Central (CST))
  - Summer (DST): UTC-5 (CDT)
- FIPS code: 27-01180
- GNIS feature ID: 0663419

Alta Vista Township is a township in Lincoln County, Minnesota, United States. The population was 163 at the 2020 census.

Alta Vista Township was named for its lofty elevation, the name being derived from Latin and meaning "high view".

== Geography ==
According to the United States Census Bureau, the township has a total area of 36.5 square miles (95 km^{2}), all land.

== Demographics ==
As of the census of 2000, there were 212 people, 71 households, and 59 families residing in the township. The population density was 5.8 inhabitants per square mile (2.2/km^{2}). There were 76 housing units at an average density of 2.1 per square mile (0.81/km^{2}). The racial makeup of the township was 100.00% White.

There were 71 households, out of which 29.6% had children under the age of 18 living with them, 78.9% were married couples living together, 1.4% had a female householder with no husband present, and 16.9% were non-families. 15.5% of all households were made up of individuals, and 4.2% had someone living alone who was 65 years of age or older. The average household size was 2.75 and the average family size was 3.02.

In the township the population was spread out, with 19.8% under the age of 18, 9.4% from 18 to 24, 20.8% from 25 to 44, 27.4% from 45 to 64, and 22.6% who were 65 years of age or older. The median age was 45 years. For every 100 females, there were 120.8 males. For every 100 females age 18 and over, there were 115.2 males.

The median income for a household in the township was $58,125, and the median income for a family was $66,250. Males had a median income of $23,000 versus $28,750 for females. The per capita income for the township was $22,063. About 3.4% of families and 10.9% of the population were below the poverty line, including none of those under the age of eighteen and 35.2% of those sixty five or over.
