= Sibley Trail =

Military road

- Location within North Dakota Location within the United States
- 46°55′11″N 97°36′11″W

The Sibley Trail was a military road utilized by the Union Army during the aftermath of the Dakota War of 1862 and the Sioux Wars. The trail runs roughly 45 miles from Fargo and western Minnesota into the central region of Dakota Territory, now the state of North Dakota. The trail was later incorporated into several communities in North Dakota including Sibley Trail Township and other communities of Barnes County, Kidder County, and Cass County among others.

== History ==
=== The Trail ===
The trail was first utilized in the summer of 1863 by Henry Hastings Sibley, whom the trail is named after. Sibley was the first Governor of Minnesota, as well as an appointed Brigadier General of volunteers during the Dakota War of 1862 and the subsequent Sioux Wars of 1863.

Following the Sibley Expedition of 1863 and the decisive defeat of the Dakota at the Battle of Killdeer Mountain Sibley took his forces back east to Minnesota. During his return in August 1863 Sibley marched over 3,400 soldiers back to the state utilizing a military road near modern day Buffalo, North Dakota.

=== Camps along the Sibley Trail ===
Several camps were established by the Sibley Expedition on their march back to Minnesota including Camp Samuel B. Sheardown, Camp Corning, and Camp Grant. Camp Sheardown was the July 14, 1863 campsite of the Sibley Expedition. The camp was named after Dr. Samuel B. Sheardown, the Regimental Surgeon of the 10th Minnesota Infantry Regiment. The camp and its historical marker are located three and one-half miles southeast of Valley City, North Dakota, the marker sits on the southern edge of a county road ditch. Camp Corning was the July 16, 1863 campground of the Sibley Expedition. The camp is named for the expedition's quartermaster, the marker lies eight miles northeast of Dazey, North Dakota. Camp Grant is named after Hiram Perry Grant, the Captain of Company A of the 6th Minnesota Infantry Regiment. The marker for Camp Grant is located six miles northwest of Woodworth, North Dakota and commemorates the July 23, 1863, campsite used by the Sibley expedition.

=== Historic markers ===
In the 1920s, the Daughters of the American Revolution laid several commemorative plaques at several of the locations where Sibley's troops stopped on their way back to Minnesota. The trail and its historic markers are owned and operated by the State Historical Society of North Dakota.
