= Inkpaduta =

Dakota leader who fought U.S. settlement (1797 – 1881)

- Iŋkpáduta

Santee Dakota leader

Personal details
- Born: c. 1797 Dakota Territory
- Died: 1881 Manitoba
- Parent: Wamdisapa

Military service
- Battles/wars: Spirit Lake Massacre; American Indian Wars; Battle of Big Mound; Battle of Dead Buffalo Lake; Battle of Whitestone Hill; Great Sioux War of 1876; Battle of Little Bighorn

Inkpaduta (Dakota: Iŋkpáduta, variously translated as "Red End," "Red Cap," or "Scarlet Point") (about 1797 – 1881) was a war chief of the Wahpekute band of the Dakota (Eastern or Santee Dakota) during the 1857 Spirit Lake Massacre and later Western Sioux actions against the United States Army in the Dakota Territory, Wyoming and Montana.

== Early life ==
Inkpaduta was born in what later became Rice County, Minnesota on the North East edge of Cannon Lake (Rice County, Minnesota) sometime between 1800 and 1815. He was the son of chief Wamdisapa (Black Eagle). As a child, he contracted smallpox, which killed several of his relatives and family members. The disease left him badly scarred. Sometime before the 1841 treaty between Tasagi and Wamdisapa, Wamdisapa moved his village (then known as the Red Top band) to the Vermillion River (South Dakota) after he was exiled from his original band.

== Career ==
Inkpaduta and his band were not signatories with the rest of the Wahpekute to the 1851 Treaty of Mendota, which transferred the land in northwestern Iowa to the United States. They refused to recognize the treaty restrictions. In 1852, Henry Lott, a drunken white whiskey trader, killed the new chief (Inkpaduta's older brother) and nine of his family; and Inkpaduta succeeded his brother as chief. He told the U.S. Army of the murders, but little was done to bring Lott to justice. The local prosecuting attorney nailed the dead chief's head to a pole over his house.

In the late winter of 1857, which was severe, Inkpaduta led his starving band into Iowa, where on March 8, he launched a series of raids on white settlers in the Spirit Lake area in which a total of 38 people were killed. White Americans called this the Spirit Lake Massacre. His warriors took four young women captive; three were married while the youngest captive, Abbie Gardner, 14, would be kept a few months before being ransomed in early summer. Although chased by troops from Fort Ridgely in Minnesota, Inkpaduta and his band evaded capture. They killed two of the women along the way, and released the third. The following summer in 1858, the US succeeded in negotiating the ransom of the girl Abbie Gardner, who was returned to Spirit Lake. She later became known for her memoir about the events and her captivity, published in 1888 to great success, with repeated editions and two reprintings by the early twentieth century.

By the time of the Dakota War of 1862, Inkpaduta had already been driven out of Minnesota with the help of other Dakota who did not wish to put their own annuity goods and money at risk. After many of the Dakota were driven out of the state following the 1862 war, the Army sent two major punitive expeditions into Dakota Territory; one in 1863 under Brigadier General Henry Hastings Sibley, who defeated the Dakota in a series of battles, and another, larger expedition under Brigadier General Alfred Sully in 1864 which concluded with the Dakota's defeat in the decisive Battle of Killdeer Mountain. Inkpaduta's band withdrew westward with their Lakota kinsfolk, and the chief migrated with survivors onto the Great Plains. He eventually fell in with the Lakotas (the Western or Teton Sioux) and became friends with Sitting Bull. He fought alongside the Lakota against Custer at the Battle of Little Bighorn.

When Sitting Bull and his followers fled to Canada following the battle, Inkpaduta accompanied them. He died in Manitoba in 1881.
