= Battle of Stony Lake =

Battle of the American Civil War

Coordinates: 46.8514°N 100.1843°W

- Part of Sioux Wars, American Civil War
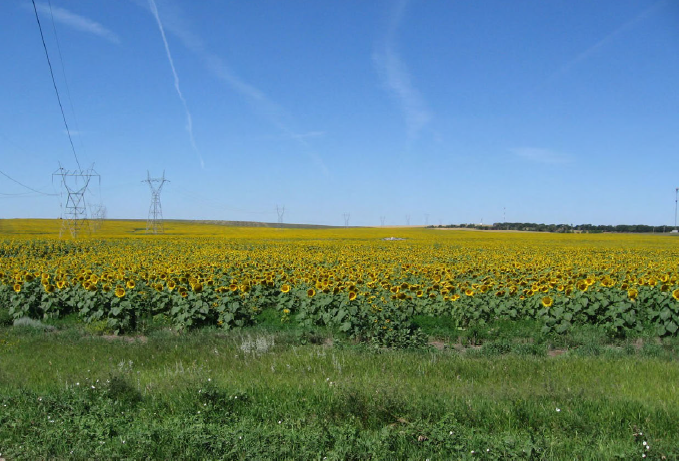
- Stony Lake battlefield
Date	July 28, 1863
Location	Dakota Territory; Present-day Burleigh County, North Dakota
Result	United States victory

Belligerents
United States of America	Santee Sioux; Teton Sioux; Yankton; Yanktonai

Commanders and leaders
Henry Hastings Sibley	Inkpaduta

Strength
2,056	1,600 to 2,500

Casualties and losses
2 dead	At least 3

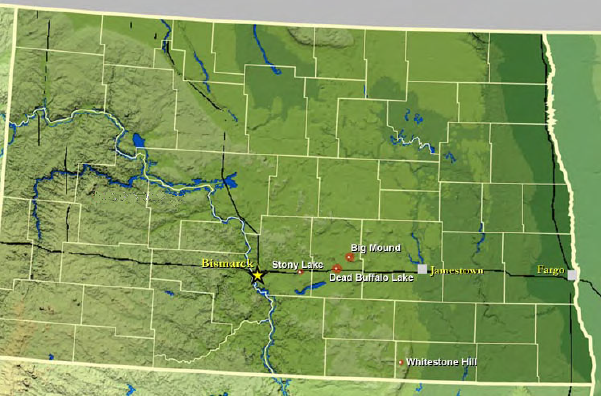
Map of the Operations Against the Sioux in North Dakota

The Battle of Stony Lake was the third and last engagement of Henry Hastings Sibley's 1863 campaign against the Santee, Yankton, Yanktonai and Teton Sioux in Dakota Territory. Following the battle, the Indians fought delaying actions against Sibley until their women and children had successfully crossed the Missouri River. Sibley then gave up his chase of them.

== Background ==
Sibley fought the Sioux in the Battle of Big Mound on July 24 and at the Battle of Dead Buffalo Lake on July 26. The Sioux retreated westward after each battle, the warriors covering the flight of their women and children toward the Missouri River. Sibley anticipated that he might trap the Indians between his forces and those of General Alfred Sully, who was ascending the Missouri River with 1,200 soldiers.

On July 27, the day after the Battle of Dead Buffalo Lake, Sibley marched his 2,000 men 23 miles to Stony Lake and camped there for the night. The next morning, he broke camp before dawn and continued his march on the trail of the Indians. About two hours later, his scouts, mostly mixed-blood Sioux, reported a large mounted force advancing on Sibley's column.

== Battle ==
The Sioux apparently hoped to surprise Sibley, strike at a weak point, and force him to abandon his pursuit. Warned of their approach, Sibley closed up his stretched-out column of soldiers, sent out skirmishers, and deployed his artillery. The Sioux warriors appeared shortly on hills in a semi-circle with an arc of 5 or 6 miles around Sibley's forces. Sibley estimated their numbers at 2,200 to 2,500. The Sioux said their force totaled 1,600 warriors. Most of the Indians, however, were armed only with bows and arrows and muskets, thus ineffective fighting at distances of more than 100 yards.

Nearly surrounding Sibley's column, but having failed to surprise him, the Sioux probed for weak spots. Colonel James H. Baker's 10th Minnesota Regiment was in Sibley's van and advanced, firing volleys and supported by two mountain howitzers. The Sixth Minnesota and Seventh Minnesota Regiments deployed to the left and right of Sibley's wagon train. Charges by companies of infantry dislodged the Indians from several hills. Shortly, the Sioux gave up the battle and faded away. Sibley was unable to pursue them as his horses and men were tired.

Sibley did not suffer any casualties. Sioux casualties are unknown, but probably light. Three Indians were seen to have been knocked off their horses by an artillery round.

== Across the wide Missouri ==
After the Sioux had departed, Sibley marched his men unmolested for 18 miles and camped on Apple Creek, about 10 miles southeast of present-day Bismarck, North Dakota. He had anticipated meeting Sully, who was supposed to be proceeding up the Missouri River by steamboat, near there but there was no sign of him. The next morning, July 29, Sibley sent two howitzers and his mounted Rangers forward about 12 miles to attempt to prevent the Sioux from crossing the Missouri River. He was too late; most had crossed the preceding day, but, in their hasty flight had been forced to abandon many of their belongings.

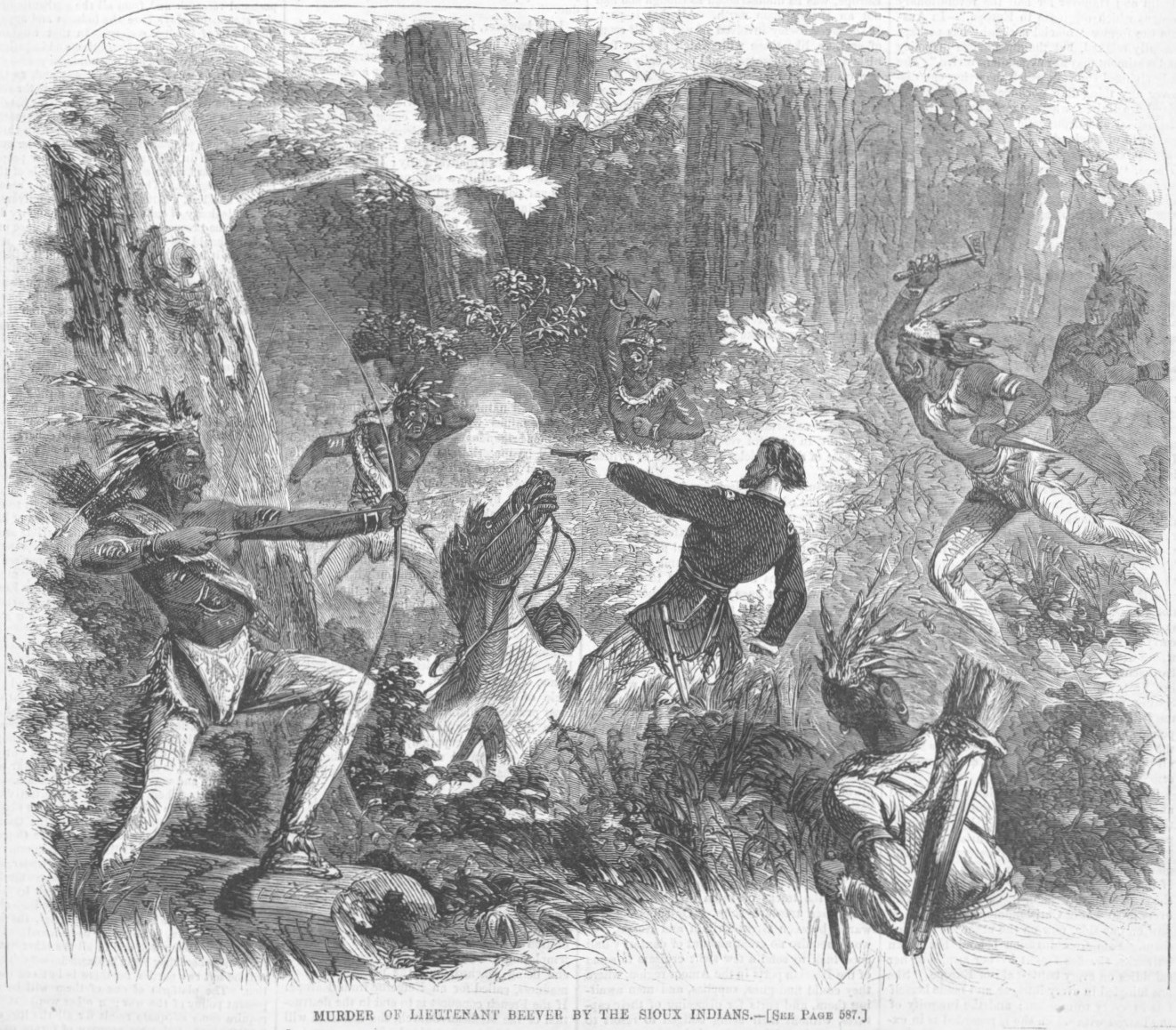
An artist's depiction of the death of Sibley's aide Lt. Frederick Beever of the 7th Minnesota Infantry after the Battle of Stony Lake On July 29, 1863.

Some of the warriors were still on the eastern side of the Missouri and Sibley shelled them, causing them to swim across the river to the safer western side where they continued to fire at long distance on Sibley's men. Two of Sibley's men, separated from the main body of soldiers were killed. Sibley camped near the river and the next three nights was subjected to constant, small-scale attacks by the Sioux who burned the prairie, fired into the army's tents, and stampeded some livestock. With Sully, supplies, and reinforcements nowhere to be found, Sibley decided on July 31 to abandon the operation and march back to Minnesota. His horses and men were worn down.

Sibley proclaimed his expedition a success as he had pushed the Sioux westward across the Missouri River, far from the settlements in Minnesota and eastern Dakota territory. He claimed to have killed and wounded 150 Indians in the three battles at a loss to his own forces of six men killed. The Santee chief, Standing Buffalo, however, claimed that only 13 Indians had been killed. It is impossible to reconcile the different estimates of Sioux casualties, as it is difficult to determine with precision how many Indian warriors were actually engaged in the battles.

The Sioux took their revenge on August 3, three days after Sibley had left the banks of the Missouri to return to Minnesota. They attacked a river raft and killed 22 civilians. Nor did raids into Minnesota cease as sixteen whites are known to have been killed by Sioux later in 1863.

Later that summer, Sully, tardy in joining forces with Sibley, would meet the Sioux in the Battle of Whitestone Hill.

== Federal units involved ==
- District of Minnesota: Brigadier General Henry Hastings Sibley
  - 1st Minnesota Cavalry "Mounted Rangers": Colonel Samuel McPhail
  - 6th Minnesota Infantry: Colonel William Crooks
  - 7th Minnesota Infantry: Lieutenant Colonel William R. Marshall
  - 10th Minnesota Infantry: Colonel James H. Baker
  - 3rd Minnesota Light Artillery Battery: Lieutenant J. C. Whipple

== See also ==
- History of North Dakota
- Plains Indians Wars
- List of battles fought in North Dakota
