= Battle of Big Mound =

Battle of the American Civil War

Coordinates: 47.024036°N 99.629087°W

- Part of Sioux Wars, Sibley's 1863 Campaign, American Civil War
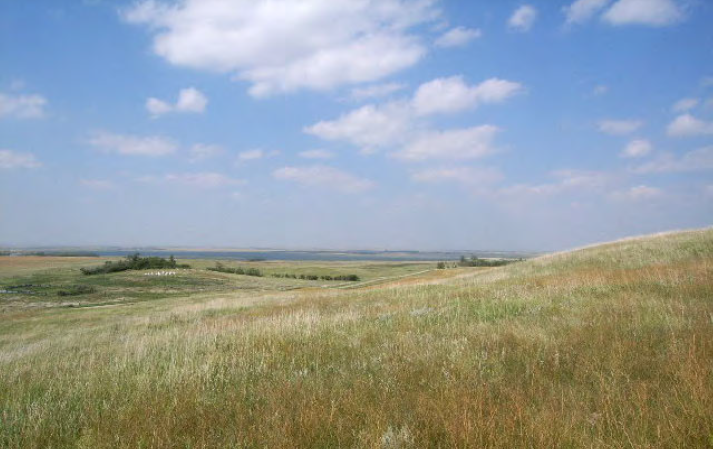
- Big Mound battlefield
Date	July 24, 1863
Location	Dakota Territory; Present-day Kidder County, North Dakota
Result	U.S. victory

Belligerents
United States of America	Santee Sioux; Yankton, Yanktonai and Teton Sioux

Commanders and leaders
Henry Hastings Sibley	Inkpaduta; Standing Buffalo

Strength
2,056 soldiers 60 mixed-blood and Sioux scouts	1,000–1,500

Casualties and losses
3 killed, 4 wounded	Uncertain, 9 or more killed

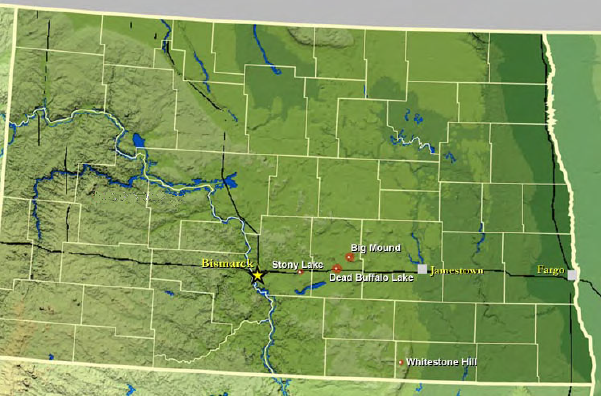
Map of the Operations Against the Sioux in North Dakota

The Battle of Big Mound was a United States Army victory in July 1863 over the Santee Sioux Indians allied with some Yankton, Yanktonai and Teton Sioux in Dakota Territory. The battle was the first major engagement of Sibley's 1863 Campaign, also called Sibley's Expedition.

== Background ==
The defeat of Little Crow in the Dakota War of 1862 caused the widespread dispersion of the Santee Sioux or Eastern Dakota. Of the 6,300 Santee, 2,000 were taken prisoner. About 700 of the Lower Sioux from the Mdewakanton and Wahpekute bands remained at large. Most of the 4,000 Upper Sioux from the Sisseton and Wahpeton bands, who had been reluctant participants in the war, also remained free. A few of these refugees from the war fled to Canada, but more than 4,000 congregated in the summer of 1863 in a large encampment in present-day Kidder County, North Dakota. They were joined in the camp by an unknown, but probably sizeable, number of their Teton, Yankton, and Yanktonai relatives.

Despite the defeat in the 1862 war, however, Santee raids continued in 1863, resulting in more than a dozen white deaths in Minnesota. To protect the frontier, Henry Hastings Sibley, appointed brigadier general of volunteers, was ordered by his superior, General John Pope, to lead a military expedition to punish the Santee. On June 16 Sibley departed from near Fort Ridgely and marched into the Dakota Territory. His army initially numbered 3,320 men, the largest military force ever assembled to combat the Indians.

Sibley's ponderous column proceeded very slowly northwestward, hampered by drought, heat, and a lack of potable water. After a month of travel without having seen a single Indian, Sibley was informed by a group of buffalo hunters, mostly Métis Chippewa, of the location of a large Santee encampment of 600 lodges. With a stripped-down army of 2,056 men – 1,436 infantry, 520 cavalry, and 100 artillery plus 60 mixed blood and Sioux scouts – Sibley located the Santee encampment on July 24. He halted nearby and sent scout and interpreter Joseph LaFramboise, one-half Sioux, to the Indian camp to propose a meeting with Upper Sioux leader Standing Buffalo. Sibley believed, probably correctly, that Standing Buffalo and his followers favored peace with the whites. However, Inkpaduta, believed to be implacably hostile to whites, and his band were also in the Indian camp.

== Battle ==
Anticipating a meeting between Sibley and Standing Buffalo, a group of Sioux and Sibley's scouts gathered peacefully on a hill, called Big Mound, 300 to 400 yards from Sibley's camp. An army surgeon, Dr. Josiah S. Weiser, approached Big Mound to greet several Indian friends, but was suddenly shot and killed by Tall Crown, a follower of Inkpaduta. The scouts and the Sioux opened fire on each other and the battle began.

Sibley estimated that he faced 1,000 to 1,500 Indian warriors. They took cover behind hills and in ravines. Sibley sent forward two companies of Mounted Rangers to drive the Indians away from Big Mound and supported them with more soldiers and a six-pounder cannon. On reaching the top of Big Mound, Sibley could see the Indian warriors retreating, guarding the women and children of the Indian camp fleeing westward with their possessions. The Santee were poorly armed. Only about one half had firearms and those had little ammunition.

Several hundred of the Mounted Rangers pursued the Indian warriors, protecting the flight of their women and children, until nightfall. Most of Sibley's infantry devoted themselves to destroying the large quantities of jerky, buffalo robes, cooking utensils, and other goods left behind by the Sioux in their hasty flight.

Sibley intended for the Rangers to continue the pursuit of the Sioux the next day, camping where they were for the night. However, by a mistaken order, the Rangers were ordered instead to return to their base, 12 miles from where they were. They arrived exhausted and Sibley was forced to rest his soldiers and horses the next day, July 25, before continuing his pursuit on July 26. Sibley's casualties for the day were three dead and four wounded. In Sibley's official report he estimated that 80 Indians had been killed and wounded, but his diary said that only 9 were killed.

== Results ==
The Sioux seemed to have little stomach to fight Sibley. Standing Buffalo may have surrendered his followers en masse if not for the killing of the army surgeon which precipitated this battle. The Battles of Dead Buffalo Lake and Stony Lake soon followed as Sibley pursued the Sioux westward.

== Federal Units Involved ==
- District of Minnesota: Brigadier General Henry Hastings Sibley
  - 1st Minnesota Cavalry "Mounted Rangers": Colonel Samuel McPhail
  - 6th Minnesota Infantry: Colonel William Crooks
  - 7th Minnesota Infantry: Lieutenant Colonel William R. Marshall
  - 10th Minnesota Infantry: Colonel James H. Baker
  - 3rd Minnesota Light Artillery Battery: Lieutenant J. C. Whipple

== See also ==
- History of North Dakota
- Plains Indians Wars
- List of battles fought in North Dakota
