= Battle of Dead Buffalo Lake =

Battle of the American Civil War

Coordinates: 46.8961°N 99.7846°W

- Part of Sioux Wars, American Civil War
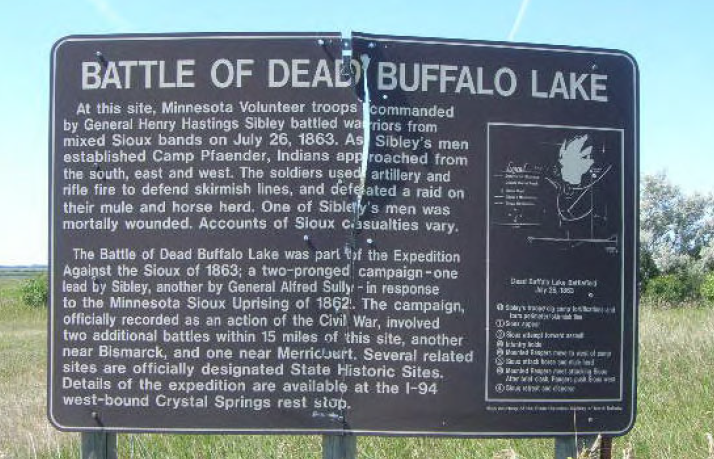
- Interpretive sign at the battle site
Date	July 26, 1863
Location	Dakota Territory; Present-day Kidder County, North Dakota
Result	United States victory

Belligerents
United States	Teton and Santee Sioux

Commanders and leaders
Henry Hastings Sibley	Inkpaduta; Sitting Bull; Gall

Strength
2,056	1,600

Casualties and losses
1 dead	1–15 dead (estimated)

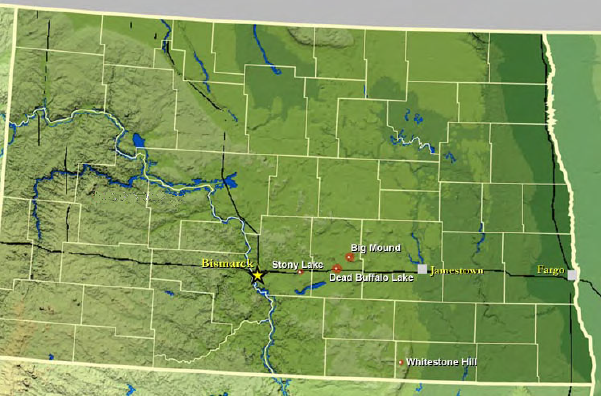
Map of the Operations Against the Sioux in North Dakota

The Battle of Dead Buffalo Lake was a skirmish in July 1863 in Dakota Territory between United States army forces and Santee, Yankton, Yanktonai and Teton Sioux. The Sioux attempted to capture the pack train of the army and retired from the field when they were unsuccessful.

== Background ==
The defeat of Little Crow in the Dakota War of 1862 caused the widespread dispersion of the Santee Sioux or Eastern Dakota. More than 4,000 Santee and other Sioux congregated in the summer of 1863 in a large encampment in present-day Kidder County, North Dakota.

In June and July 1863, Brigadier general Henry Hastings Sibley led a military expedition to punish the Santee. Sibley had 2,056 men – 1,436 infantry, 520 cavalry, and 100 artillery and white and Indian scouts. On July 24, Sibley found the Sioux camp and the Battle of Big Mound ensued. The Sioux retired from the battlefield, the warriors fighting a rear guard action to protect their families for about 12 miles (20 km). As the families continued to flee toward safety across the Missouri River, the warriors paused at Dead Buffalo Lake, about two miles (3 km) northwest of present-day Dawson, North Dakota to await Sibley's advance.

Many of the Santee under their leader Standing Buffalo had been reluctant fighters and appear to have avoided further conflict by fleeing northwest and eventually to Canada, rather than halt at Dead Buffalo Lake. The remaining Santee, Yankton, and Yanktonai whose best known leader was Inkpaduta, were joined by about 650 Hunkpapa and Blackfoot (Lakota) Teton warriors. This brought the number of Indian warriors up to 1,600, according to one estimate. Sitting Bull was among the Teton reinforcements.

== Battle ==
Sibley marched to Dead Buffalo Lake on July 26 and about noon camped near the shores of the small lake. Mounted Sioux appeared shortly on the hills surrounding the lake and Sibley's camp, threatening an attack. Sibley advanced his artillery, two companies of infantry, and his pioneers to a position about 600 yards in advance of his camp and opened fire at long range on the Indians. The Indians withdrew to a safe distance.

The objective of the Sioux seems to have been to capture the army's pack train of horses and mules and immobilize Sibley. They first attempted an assault on Sibley's left flank, but were checked by a company of mounted rangers and two companies of infantry. The Indians then disappeared into the hills. Several muleteers in Sibley's camp assumed the engagement was over and took the livestock out of the defense lines to graze. The Sioux re-appeared in force on the right flank and made another effort to capture the stock, but were repulsed in a brief close-quarter fight by two companies of cavalry and 6 companies of infantry. Sitting Bull, armed with only a whip, was said to have counted coup on a muleteer and captured his mule. Failing in their mission to capture most of the horses and mules, the Indians then retired from the field and the battle was over.

One soldier was killed. The soldiers estimated they had killed 15 Sioux.

== Aftermath ==
Sibley continued his pursuit of the Sioux the following day, attempting to catch them before they could cross the Missouri River. On July 28 he engaged them again at the Battle of Stony Lake.

== Federal Units Involved ==
- District of Minnesota: Brigadier General Henry Hastings Sibley
  - 1st Minnesota Cavalry "Mounted Rangers": Colonel Samuel McPhail
  - 6th Minnesota Infantry: Colonel William Crooks
  - 7th Minnesota Infantry: Lieutenant Colonel William R. Marshall
  - 10th Minnesota Infantry: Colonel James H. Baker
  - 3rd Minnesota Light Artillery Battery: Lieutenant J. C. Whipple

== See also ==
- History of North Dakota
- Plains Indians Wars
- List of battles fought in North Dakota

== Sources ==
- Andrews, C. C., ed. (1891). Minnesota in the Civil and Indian Wars 1861-1865. St. Paul, Minn: Printed for the state by the Pioneer Press Co. OL 7088819M.
- National Park Service Battle Summary
- CWSAC Report Update and Resurvey: Individual Battlefield Profiles
