= National Register of Historic Places listings in Nicollet County, Minnesota =

Location of Nicollet County in Minnesota

This is a list of the National Register of Historic Places listings in Nicollet County, Minnesota. It is intended to be a complete list of the properties and districts on the National Register of Historic Places in Nicollet County, Minnesota, United States. The locations of National Register properties and districts for which the latitude and longitude coordinates are included below, may be seen in an online map.

There are 24 properties and districts listed on the National Register in the county. A supplementary list includes two additional sites that were formerly on the National Register.

This National Park Service list is complete through NPS recent listings posted May 1, 2026.

== Current listings ==
	Name on the Register	Image	Date listed	Location	City or town	Description
1	Broadway Bridge	Broadway Bridge	August 5, 1999 (#99000934)	Minnesota Highway 99 over the Minnesota River; 44°19′29″N 93°57′11″W	St. Peter	1931 steel highway bridge built with two asymmetrical trusses disguised by ornamental members to span a challenging site at a river bend. Extends into Le Sueur County.
2	Center Building–Minnesota Hospital for the Insane	Center Building–Minnesota Hospital for the Insane	July 31, 1986 (#86002117)	100 Freeman Dr. 44°18′19″N 93°58′40″W	St. Peter	Oldest of Minnesota's monumental central buildings for state social institutions, constructed 1867–1878 on the Kirkbride Plan for the state's first psychiatric hospital. Now the St. Peter State Hospital Museum.
3	Church of the Holy Communion	Church of the Holy Communion	May 19, 1983 (#83000914)	116 N. Minnesota Ave. 44°19′36″N 93°57′20″W	St. Peter	Striking Gothic Revival church designed by Henry Martyn Congdon and built 1869–70 for the Episcopal parish that founded St. Peter.
4	Eugene Saint Julien Cox House	Eugene Saint Julien Cox House	November 20, 1970 (#70000305)	500 N. Washington Ave. 44°19′56″N 93°57′42″W	St. Peter	One of Minnesota's few Carpenter Gothic houses, built in 1871 for Eugene Saint Julien Cox (1834–1898), a colorful settler turned politician and judge. A historic house museum since 1971.
5	Frederick A. Donahower House	Frederick A. Donahower House	May 19, 1983 (#83000915)	720 S. Minnesota Ave. 44°19′13″N 93°57′40″W	St. Peter	Distinctive Italianate house built c. 1875 for influential local banker Frederick A. Donahower (1830–1917).
6	Fort Ridgely	Fort Ridgely	December 2, 1970 (#70000304)	72404 County Road 30; 44°27′11″N 94°44′04″W	Ridgely Township	Minnesota's third-oldest military post, active 1853–1867, and site of the Battle of Fort Ridgely in August 1862. Now a state historic site consisting of one reconstructed building, one original building, and foundation ruins.
7	Fort Ridgely State Park CCC/Rustic Style Historic Resources	Fort Ridgely State Park CCC/Rustic Style Historic Resources	October 25, 1989 (#89001668)	72158 County Road 30; 44°27′11″N 94°43′51″W	Ridgely Township	26 park facilities built 1935–39, significant as examples of New Deal federal work relief, National Park Service rustic architecture, and Minnesota's first extensive state park facilities developed around a historic site.
8	Alexander Harkin Store	Alexander Harkin Store	June 4, 1973 (#73000989)	66250 County Highway 21; 44°23′13″N 94°35′56″W	West Newton Township	1871 country store and post office that closed in 1901 with most of its inventory intact. Now a museum.
9	John A. Johnson House	John A. Johnson House	May 19, 1983 (#83000916)	418 N. 3rd St. 44°19′47″N 93°57′17″W	St. Peter	1905 house of three-term governor John Albert Johnson (1861–1909).
10	Sarah and Thomas Montgomery House	Sarah and Thomas Montgomery House	December 13, 2000 (#00001509)	408 Washington Ave. S. 44°19′32″N 93°57′51″W	St. Peter	Exemplary Italianate house, built in 1874.
11	Nicollet County Bank	Nicollet County Bank	May 19, 1983 (#83000917)	224 S. Minnesota Ave. 44°19′28″N 93°57′27″W	St. Peter	Prominent and elaborately detailed Queen Anne commercial building constructed in 1887 for Nicollet County's second-oldest bank. Also a contributing property to the St. Peter Commercial Historic District.
12	Nicollet County Courthouse and Jail	Nicollet County Courthouse and Jail	September 6, 2002 (#02000939)	501 S. Minnesota Ave. 44°19′18″N 93°57′31″W	St. Peter	Romanesque Revival courthouse built 1880–81 and Queen Anne jail built in 1906; a distinctive and long-serving government complex.
13	Nicollet House Hotel	Nicollet House Hotel	May 12, 1975 (#75000998)	120 S. Minnesota Ave. 44°19′31″N 93°57′24″W	St. Peter	1873 hotel funded by local investors to create a high-class amenity befitting St. Peter's economic importance. Also a contributing property to the St. Peter Commercial Historic District.
14	Norseland General Store	Norseland General Store	May 19, 1983 (#83000918)	Minnesota Highway 22; 44°24′43″N 94°06′56″W	Norseland	Rare surviving example—built c. 1900—of the country stores once common to Minnesota's rural crossroads from the mid 19th to early 20th centuries.
15	North Mankato Public School	North Mankato Public School	January 27, 1983 (#83000919)	442 Belgrade Ave. 44°10′13″N 94°00′48″W	North Mankato	North Mankato's most prominent public building, a Queen Anne school built in 1890 and doubled with a symmetrical 1904 expansion.
16	Old Main, Gustavus Adolphus College	Old Main, Gustavus Adolphus College	May 12, 1976 (#76001065)	Gustavus Adolphus College campus 44°19′23″N 93°58′14″W	St. Peter	Oldest building and emblem of Gustavus Adolphus College, built 1875–76. Also noted for its Italianate design by Edward Bassford.
17	Emily and Stephen Schumacher House	Emily and Stephen Schumacher House	December 13, 2000 (#00001507)	202 3rd St., N. 44°19′40″N 93°57′23″W	St. Peter	Leading local example of a Queen Anne house, built 1887–88.
18	St. Peter Armory	St. Peter Armory	January 9, 1997 (#96001558)	419 S. Minnesota Ave. 44°19′21″N 93°57′29″W	St. Peter	Exemplary early armory built 1912–13, one of the oldest standing in Minnesota and the first owned by the state. Also noted for its transitional architecture and central role in St. Peter's military, social, and recreational life.
19	St. Peter Carnegie Library	St. Peter Carnegie Library	May 19, 1983 (#83000920)	429 S. Minnesota Ave. 44°19′21″N 93°57′29″W	St. Peter	Longserving public library with modest Neoclassical architecture, built 1903–04.
20	St. Peter Commercial Historic District	St. Peter Commercial Historic District	January 12, 2001 (#00001610)	Minnesota Ave. between Broadway and Grace Sts. 44°19′28″N 93°57′24″W	St. Peter	Well-preserved central business district with 33 contributing properties built 1854–1930; a retail, service, and banking destination for city residents and the surrounding agricultural population.
21	William E. Stewart House	William E. Stewart House	November 8, 1984 (#84000223)	733 Range St. 44°10′30″N 94°00′32″W	North Mankato	1910 house, carriage house, and barn of a brickyard owner, symbolizing an important Mankato-area industry of the late-19th and early-20th centuries.
22	Henry A. Swift House	Henry A. Swift House	May 19, 1983 (#83000921)	820 S. Minnesota Ave. 44°19′10″N 93°57′42″W	St. Peter	1858 house of state and local politician Henry Adoniram Swift (1823–1869), third governor of Minnesota.
23	Traverse des Sioux	Traverse des Sioux	March 20, 1973 (#73000990)	1851 N. Minnesota Ave. 44°21′23″N 93°57′15″W	St. Peter	Important river ford and gathering place for the Dakota people, site of early European trading posts, missions, the negotiation and signing of the 1851 Treaty of Traverse des Sioux, and an 1855 village. Now a state historic site.
24	Union Presbyterian Church	Union Presbyterian Church	May 19, 1983 (#83000922)	311 W. Locust St. 44°19′15″N 93°57′45″W	St. Peter	1872 church noted for its fine Gothic Revival architecture surviving from the early decades of St. Peter's settlement.

== Former listings ==
	Name on the Register	Image	Date listed	Date removed	Location	City or town	Description
1	Bridge No. 6422-Saint Peter		August 5, 1999 (#99000933)	August 8, 2003	MN 99 over Washington Avenue	St. Peter	1948 deck girder bridge of cantilevered concrete, first of its kind in Minnesota. Demolished in 2001.
2	St. Peter Central School	St. Peter Central School	October 29, 1980 (#80002092)	October 5, 2000	300 S. 5th St. 44°19′33″N 93°57′45″W	St. Peter	Destroyed in the 1998 Comfrey – St. Peter tornado outbreak. Original façade worked into Central Square Apartments on the same site.

== See also ==
- List of National Historic Landmarks in Minnesota
- National Register of Historic Places listings in Minnesota
