= St. Peter State Hospital Museum =

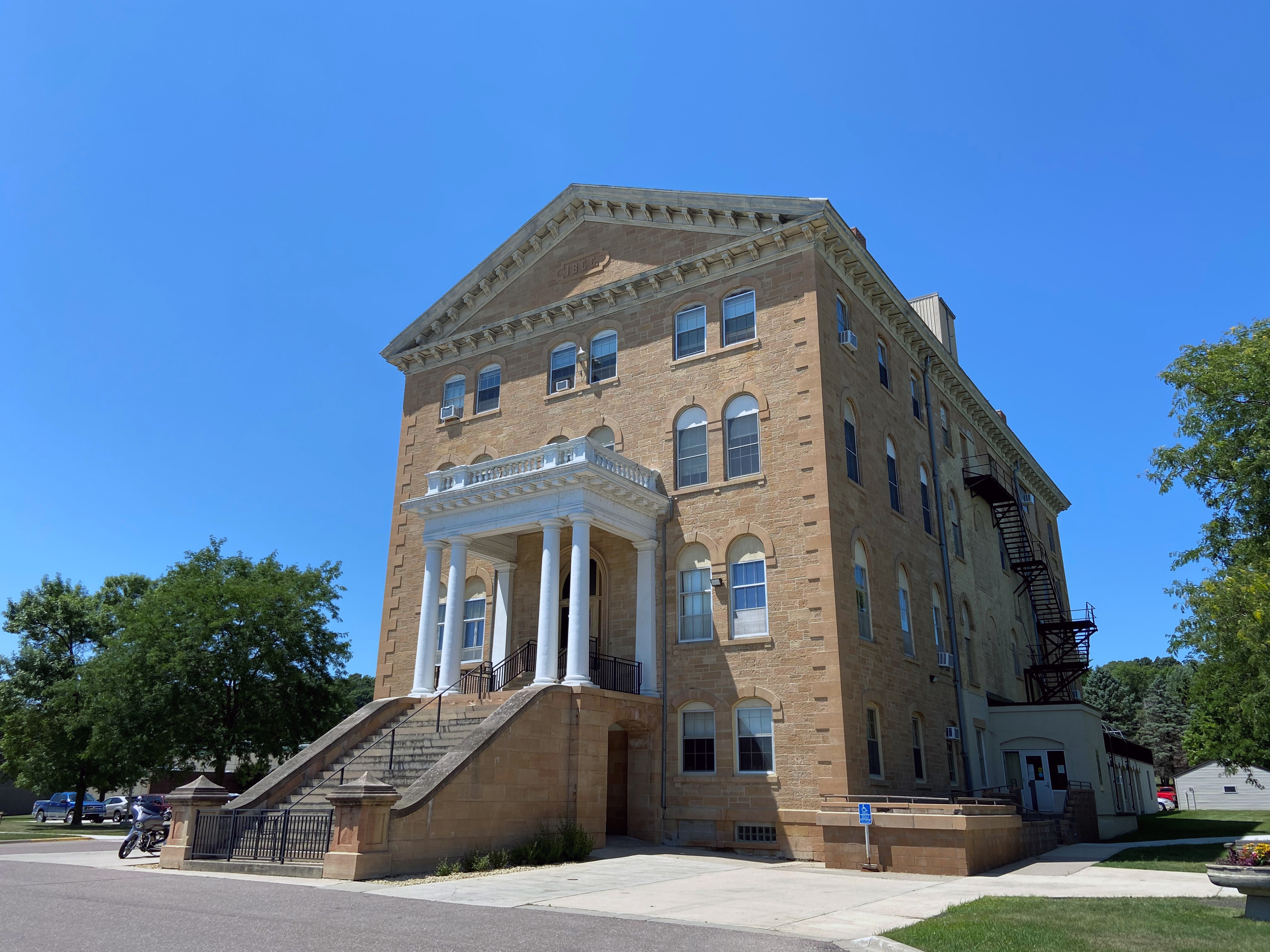
- Building exterior
- Established: 2006
- Location: 100 Freeman Drive, St. Peter, Minnesota 56082
- Type: History
- Website: Website

- Center Building-Minnesota Hospital for The Insane
- U.S. National Register of Historic Places
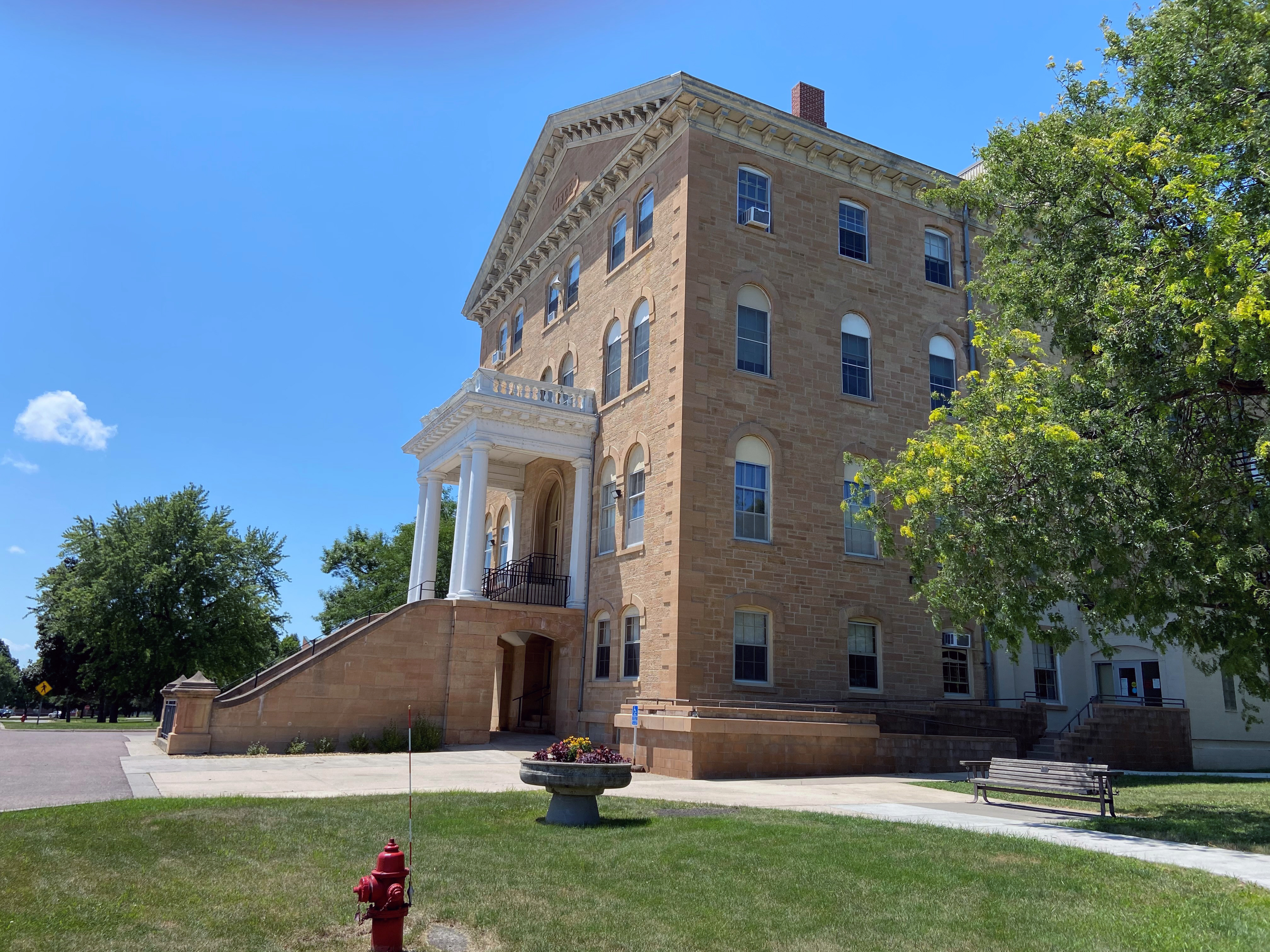
- Building exterior

- Location within Minnesota Location within the United States
- Location: 100 Freeman Drive, St. Peter, Minnesota 56082
- Coordinates: 44.305416°N 93.977783°W
- Area: 17 acres (6.9 ha)
- Built: 1867-1878
- Architect: Samuel Sloan
- NRHP reference No.: 86002117
- Added to NRHP: July 31, 1986

The St. Peter State Hospital Museum, located in St. Peter, Minnesota, United States, offers a glimpse into the history of Minnesota's first and oldest public psychiatric hospital. Established in 1866, the St. Peter State Hospital played a significant role in the evolving field of mental health care. The museum, housed within the original 1867 hospital administration building, itself on the campus of what is now St. Peter Regional Treatment Center, was created to shed light on the institution's long history and dispel misconceptions surrounding mental illness. The building was added to the National Register of Historic Places in 1986.

== History and organization ==
Because the museum is on the grounds of St. Peter Regional Treatment Center it has restricted access and offers visits by appointment only. Following a brief introduction to the hospital's history, visitors can explore exhibits covering diverse themes. These include the roles of nurses and doctors, patient care, daily routines, historical medical instruments used by staff, patient-created artwork, photographs of nursing personnel, and even salary records.

== Exhibits ==
The museum divides its space into two sections. One section focuses on the professional duties of hospital staff, including nurses and doctors. The other section details patient care and daily routines.

== Minnesota Hospital for the Insane ==
The St. Peter State Hospital Center Building is the oldest surviving structure of the first mental hospital established in Minnesota. The hospital was constructed between 1867 and 1878. The front pediment bears a tablet with the date "1866" — the year the state legislature established the St. Peter hospital. The building was designed by architect Samuel Sloan according to the principles of Dr. Thomas Kirkbride, a prominent figure in mental health treatment. Kirkbride's theories, outlined in his book "On the Construction, Organization and General Arrangements of Hospitals for the Insane," emphasized a central administration building with flanking wings for patients. This design aimed to create a stable environment for both patients and staff. Sloan was chosen for the project due to his experience working with Kirkbride. He had previously designed numerous hospitals based on Kirkbride's plan. Notably, Kirkbride himself served as a consultant on the St. Peter project.

The building as it stands today is all that remains of a much larger complex built between 1867 and 1878. The original patient wings were demolished in the late 1960s. Despite this, the Center Building retains its architectural integrity and exemplifies both Kirkbride's design philosophy and Sloan's skillful execution.

== Gallery ==
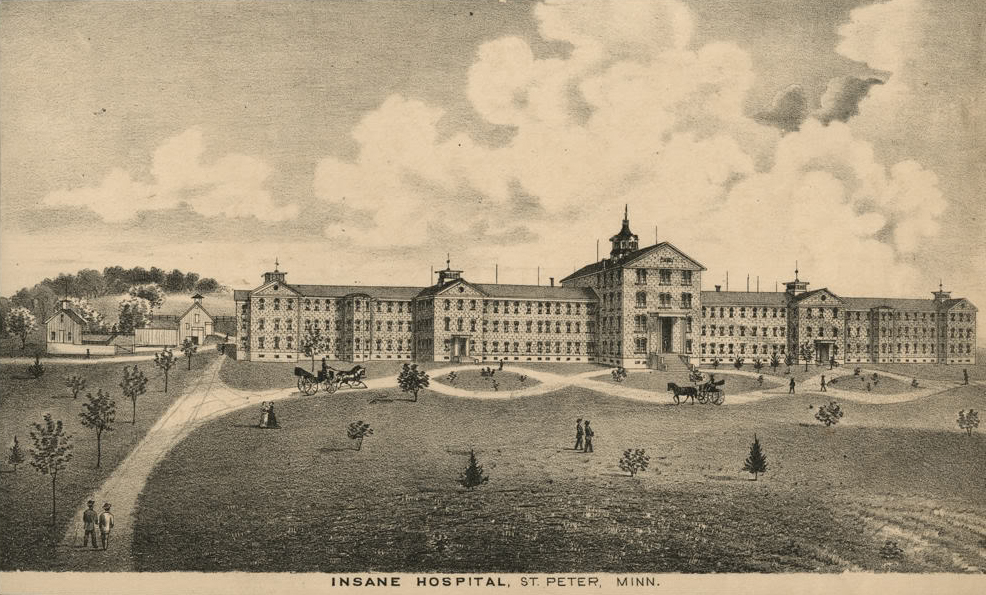
1874 Lithograph

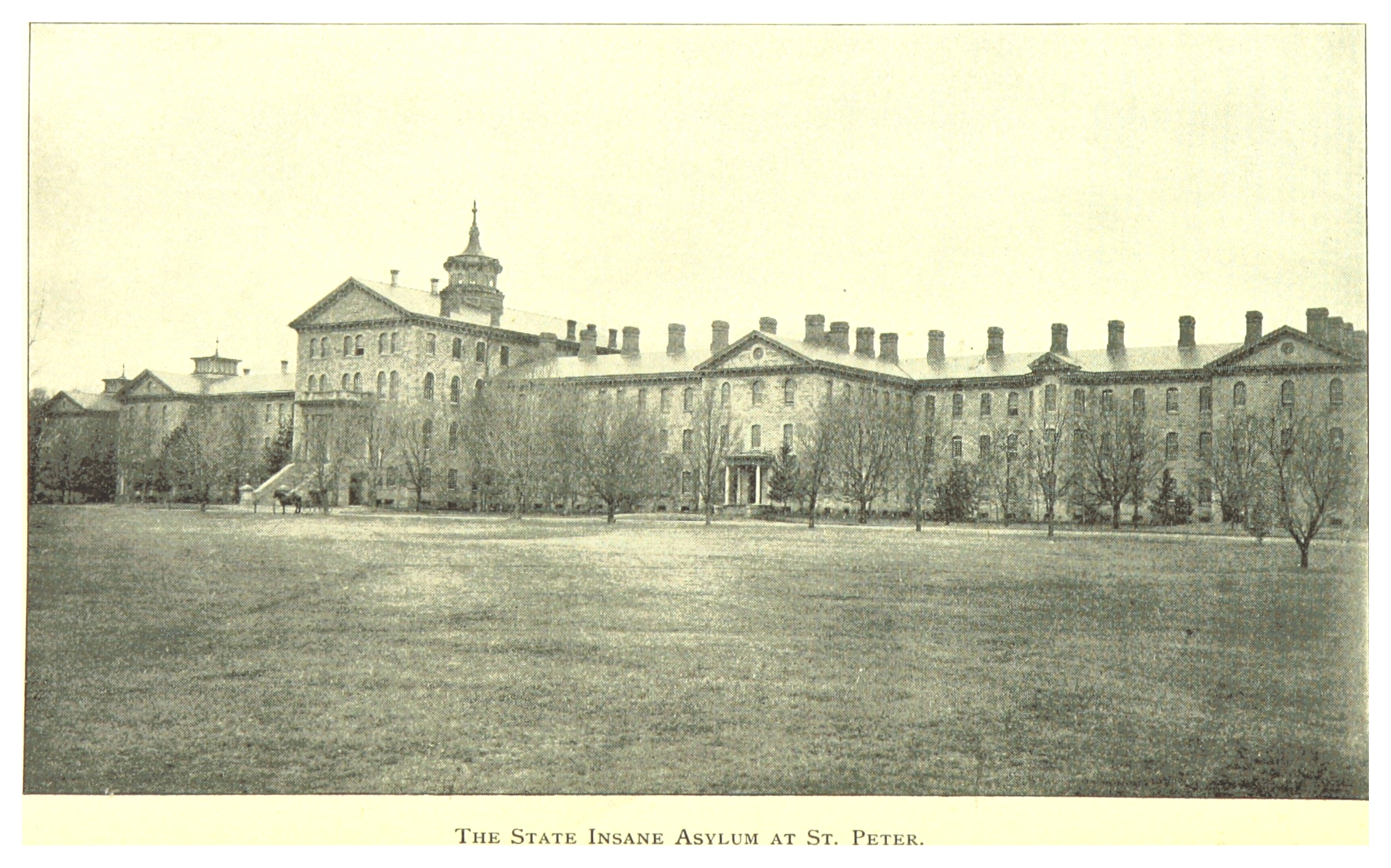
Building in 1893

== See also ==
- Minnesota Security Hospital
- National Register of Historic Places listings in Nicollet County, Minnesota
