= Asgrim Knutson Skaro =

American soldier and settler of St. Peter, Minnesota (1829–1864)

Captain Asgrim Knutson Skaro
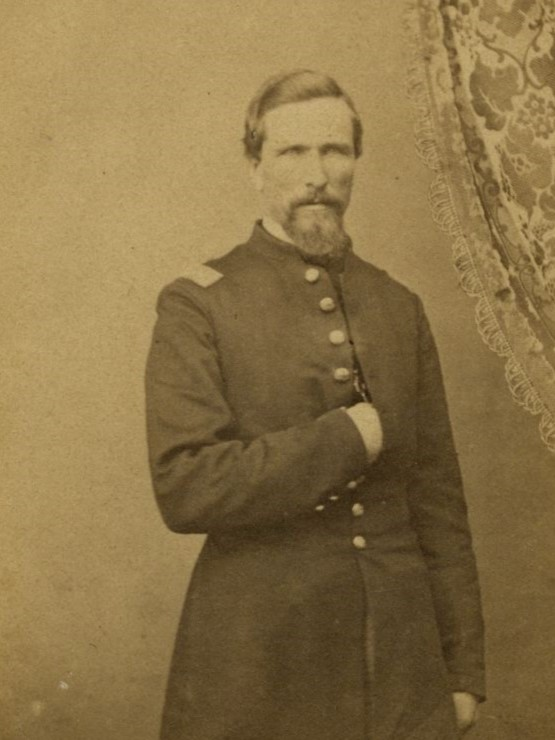
- Captain Skaro c.1862
- Born: June 4, 1829; Buskerud, Norway
- Died: December 16, 1864 (aged 35); Nashville, Tennessee, US
- Spouse: Theodora Laumann
- Children: 4
- Military career
- Allegiance: United States Army Union Army
- Rank: Captain
- Units: 2nd Minnesota Infantry Regiment; 9th Minnesota Infantry Regiment
- Commands: Company E, 2nd Minnesota Infantry Regiment; Company D, 9th Minnesota Infantry Regiment
- Conflicts: Mexican-American War: Posted at Fort Snelling; American Civil War: Battle of Mill Springs; Forrest's Defense of Mississippi; Battle of Brice's Crossroads; Battle of Tupelo; Price's Missouri Expedition; Battle of Westport; Franklin-Nashville Campaign; Battle of Nashville; Dakota War of 1862

Asgrim Knutson Skaro (June 4, 1829 - December 16, 1864) was a Norwegian immigrant to the United States, a founding settler of the city of St. Peter, Minnesota, the County Treasurer of Nicollet County, Minnesota, and a veteran of both the Mexican–American War and the American Civil War.

== Early life ==
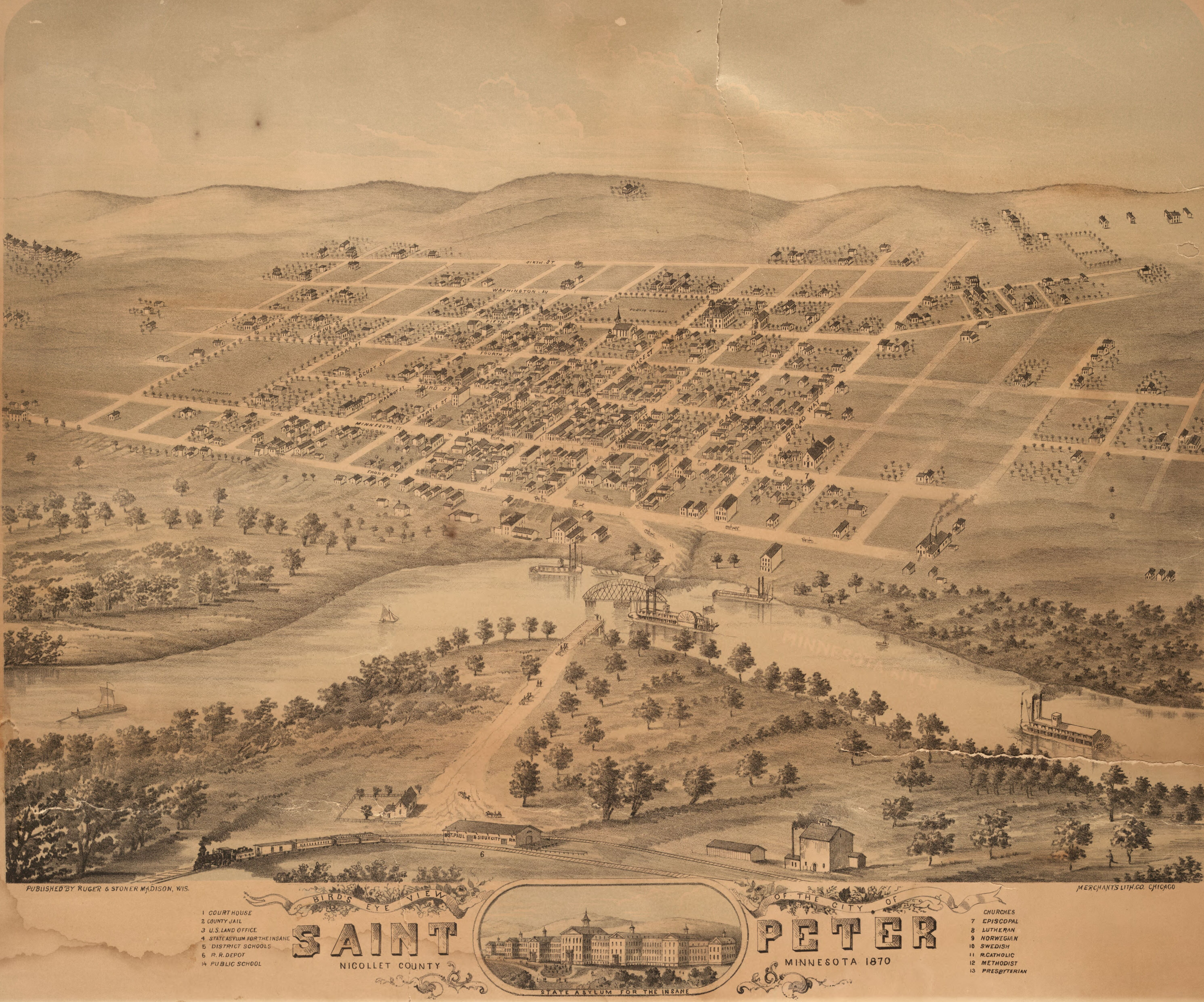
Bird's Eye view, St. Peter, Minnesota. c.1870

Asgrim Knutson Skaro was born on June 4, 1829, in Hallingdal, Buskerud in the Kingdom of Norway to Knud Ellingsen Skaro and Guro Eriksdatter. At the age of 19 Skaro emigrated to the United States in 1846 on the Brig ship "Tricolor" out of Christiania. Skaro served in the United States Army during the Mexican–American War at Fort Snelling in Saint Paul, Minnesota from 1847 to 1852. Skaro eventually settled the area of what is now St. Peter, Minnesota in 1852 alongside two fellow Norwegians, the brothers Matthias Evenson and Peder "Per" Evenson. Skaro was elected as the Treasurer of Nicollet County, Minnesota from 1858 to 1861. He was also a member of Lodge Number 12 of the Odd Fellows in St. Peter. In July 1858 around 50 men from St. Peter and the surrounding area formed a militia named the "St. Peter Guards" and elected Skaro as their Captain.

== American Civil War ==
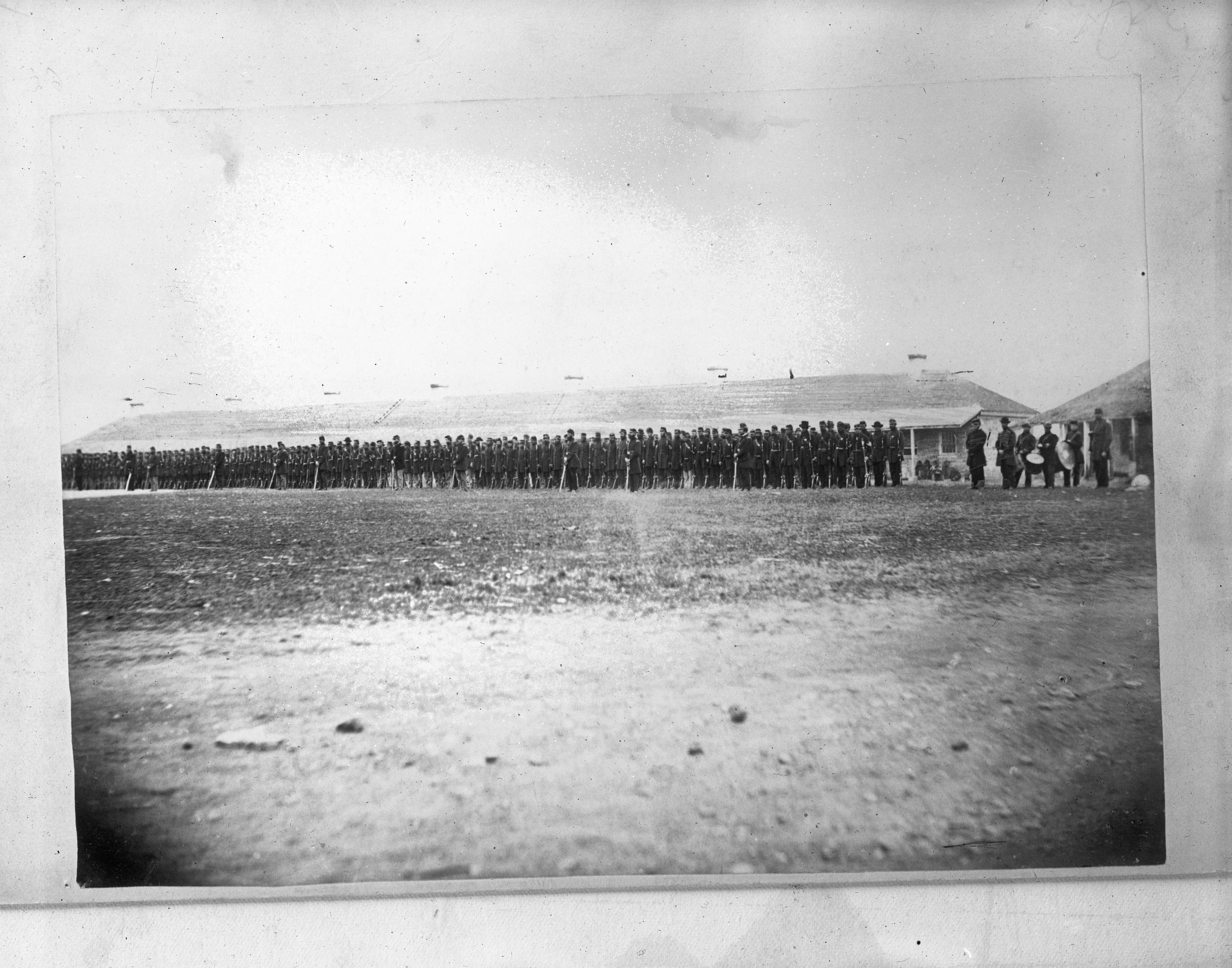
The 2nd Minnesota Regiment of Volunteers just before they left for the Civil War at Fort Snelling in 1861.

=== 2nd Minnesota Infantry Regiment ===
At the outbreak of the American Civil War Skaro formed his militia company of the St. Peter Guards to volunteer for the Union Army, Skaro's company would compose the ranks of Company E of the 2nd Minnesota Infantry Regiment. Skaro was elected as the Captain of Company E of the 2nd Minnesota alongside Eugene Saint Julien Cox who was elected as Skaro's Lieutenant. Company E was composed of volunteers primarily from Nicollet County, Brown County, and Le Sueur County, Minnesota. Skaro fought with the 2nd Minnesota until March 20, 1862, when he was forced to resign his officer's commission due to health reasons. Skaro returned to St. Peter, Minnesota until later re-joining the Army during the outbreak of the Dakota War of 1862.

=== 9th Minnesota Infantry Regiment ===
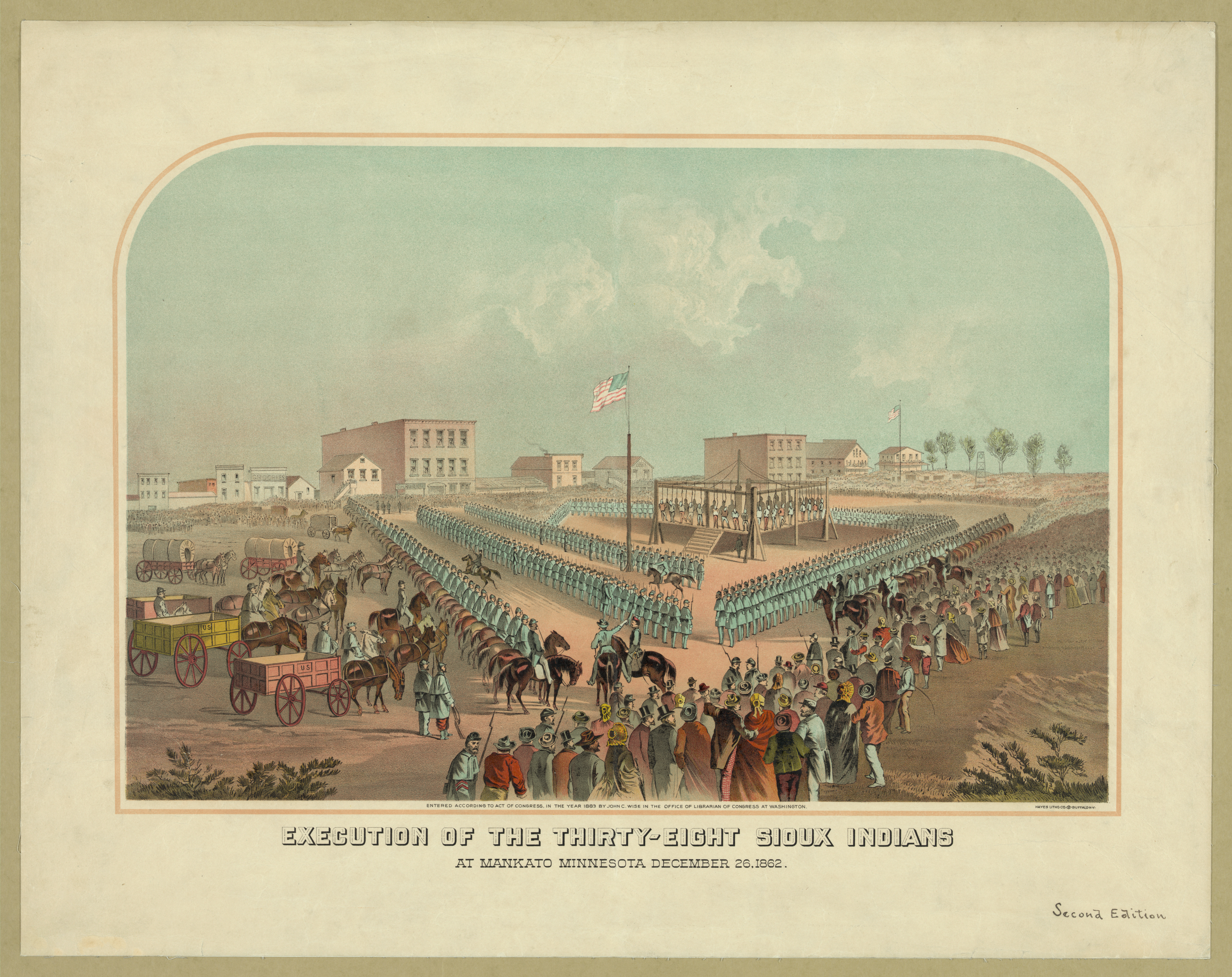
Execution of the 38 Dakota men at Mankato, Minnesota on December 26, 1862, at 10:00am.

On September 23, 1862, Skaro was mustered in as the Captain of Company D of the 9th Minnesota Infantry Regiment. Skaro participated in the Dakota War of 1862 on the Minnesota frontier which began in mid-August, 1862 following the Acton Incident and the Attack at the Lower Sioux Agency. Companies of the 9th Minnesota were organized at Camp Release, before being placed on guard duty throughout the state. Skaro's Company D was present as the Provost Guard during the hangings of the 38 Dakota people at Mankato, Minnesota on December 23, 1862.

In the autumn of 1863 the 9th Minnesota was sent to St. Louis, Missouri where it was incorporated into the Department of the Missouri. The 9th Minnesota was later transferred to the 2nd Brigade, 1st Division of the XVI Corps in the Army of the Tennessee. The 9th Minnesota would fight in Forrest's Defense of Mississippi, the Battle of Brice's Crossroads, the Battle of Tupelo, Price's Raid, the Battle of Westport, and the Battle of Nashville among others.

=== Battle of Nashville and Shy's Hill ===
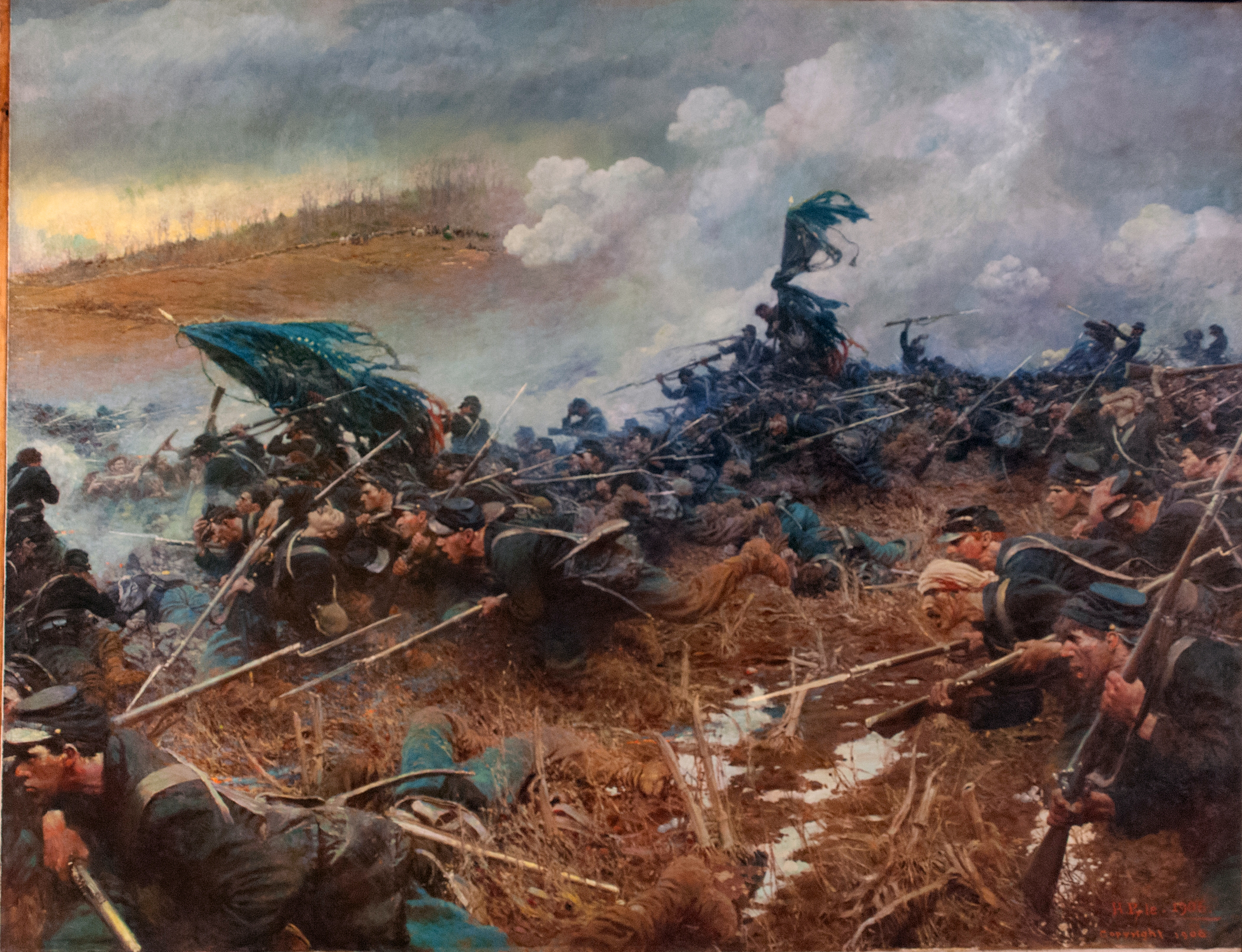
The Battle of Nashville by Howard Pyle depicts the charge of the 5th, 7th, 9th, and 10th Minnesota Regiments across the muddy cornfield at the base of Compton's Hill (Shy's Hill), c.1907.

Skaro was killed in action during the main Union attack at Shy's Hill during the During the Battle of Nashville on December 16, 1864. A bullet struck Skaro through his right breast and killed him almost instantly. Skaro's body was returned to St. Peter, Minnesota and was buried in Green Hill cemetery in St. Peter.

== Personal life ==
Skaro married Theodora Laumann of St. Peter, Minnesota on September 15, 1857. Together the Skaros had 4 children, three boys and one girl.

== Legacy ==
Skaro's name is remembered today in St. Peter, Minnesota with a street named in his honor, as well as a section of St. Peter known as the "Skaro and Evenson Addition". The local post of Grand Army of the Republic, Post Number 37 "Asgrim K. Skaro" in St. Peter, Minnesota was named in Skaro's honor. A memorial to Skaro was erected by the St. Peter Lodge Number 12 of the International Order of Odd Fellows.
