= St. Peter Armory =

- U.S. National Register of Historic Places
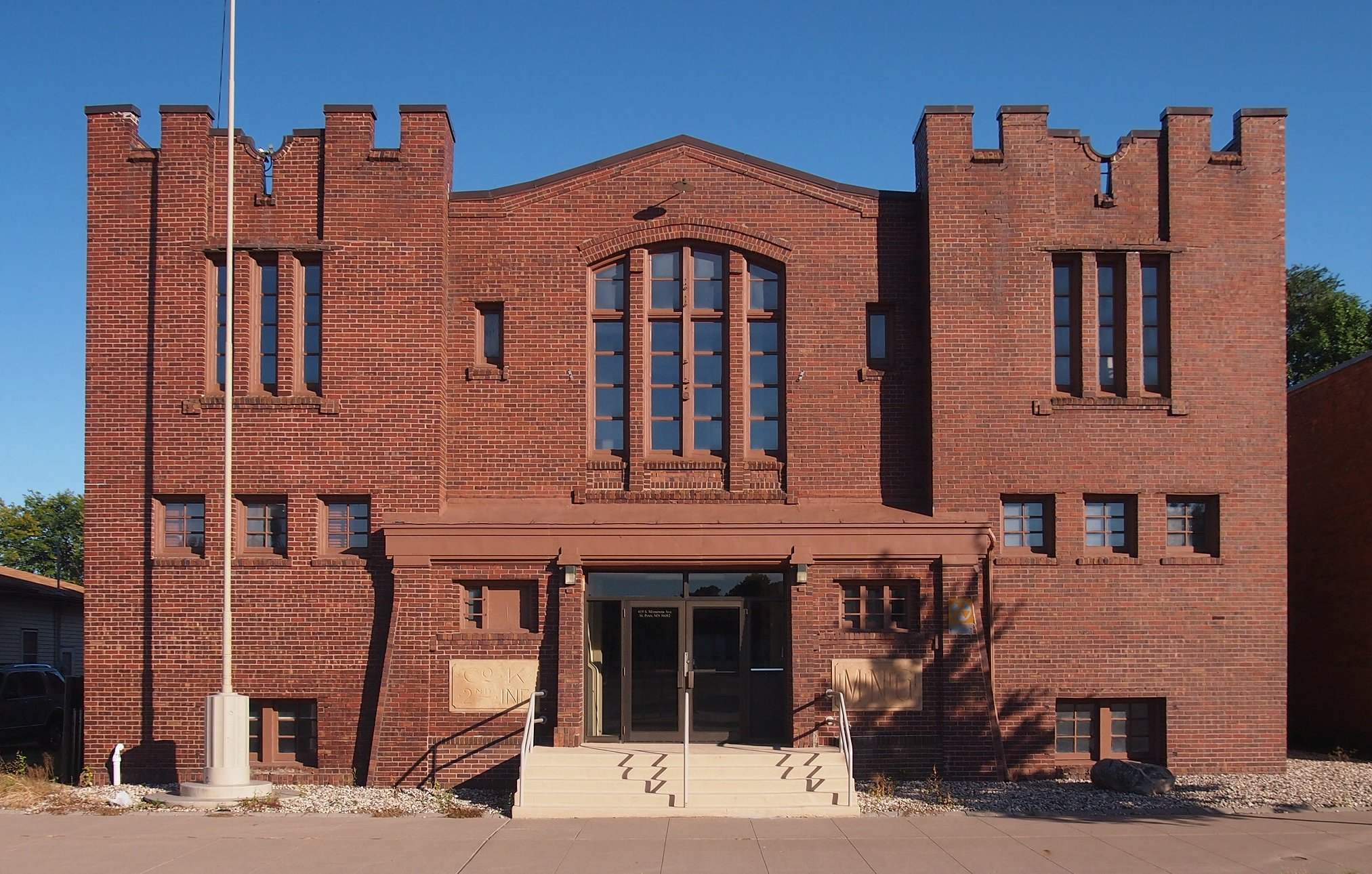
- The St. Peter Armory from the northwest

- Location within Minnesota Location within the United States
- Location: 419 S. Minnesota Avenue, St. Peter, Minnesota
- Coordinates: 44°19′21.4″N 93°57′29″W
- Area: Less than one acre
- Built: 1912–13
- Built by: Ole Fredricksen
- Architect: James F. Denson
- Architectural style: Late Gothic Revival
- NRHP reference No.: 96001558
- Designated: January 9, 1997

The St. Peter Armory is a former National Guard Armory in St. Peter, Minnesota, United States. Built from 1912 to 1913, it is one of the oldest armories still standing in Minnesota and was the first one to be owned by the state upon its completion. It was designed in a restrained Gothic Revival style which captures a transition in Minnesota armory design from heavy, fortresslike buildings to the simpler designs of the 1920s. It was listed on the National Register of Historic Places in 1997 for having local significance in the themes of architecture, military history, and social history. It was nominated for being an excellent example of Minnesota's pre-World War I armories, as well as for its early status, transitional architecture, and role in St. Peter as a center not only of military affairs but also social and recreational events.

== Origin ==
The St. Peter Armory grew out of the Militia Act of 1903. The act laid out the circumstances in which the National Guard could be federalized, and organized the Guard like the regular army. In addition, the act provided funding for military training and the construction of National Guard armories. Eight years later a board to oversee armory construction in Minnesota was created. Three armories were to be built per year. The legislature eventually appropriated $15,000 for each new armory. The state shared construction costs with the host cities. Armories built before 1911 generally had been financed with city money and through private fundraising.

The St. Peter Armory has a Medieval Revival-influenced design. A large number of the nation's pre-World War I armories were built in this style, which had fortress-like elements. It had been popular in armory design since the 1880s. In the 20th century, architects began moving away from the Medieval Revival style. Armories became less fortress-like and more civically oriented in their design. The St. Peter Armory has Medieval Revival, as well as civically influenced elements. It is an excellent example of the transition in armory design that was occurring at the time. The armory was designed by architect James F. Denson and built by Ole Fredricksen of St. Peter.

== Use ==
St. Peter's Company K of the Second Infantry Regiment, Minnesota National Guard, was the first unit based at the armory. The unit served during the 1916–1917 height of the U.S.–Mexican Border War and World War I.

After World War I the Minnesota National Guard reorganized. The Armory became home to Company D of the 205th Infantry Regiment. In the years between the World Wars the Minnesota National Guard was called to duty more than thirty times. During World War II the St. Peter unit was deployed to the Aleutian Islands. After World War II the Minnesota National Guard reorganized again. The St. Peter unit was designated a Service Battery of the First Battalion, 125th Field Artillery of the 47th Division. The unit was activated during the Korean War.

The armory also served as a community center. Military clubs met there as well as the local American Legion post. The armory was one of the city's principal social and recreational facilities for about 65 years. Trade shows, conventions, sporting events, dances, roller skating parties, and educational activities were held there.

The local National Guard unit eventually outgrew the St. Peter Armory. After World War II the size of guard units in the state expanded from an average of 66 to 135 men. In addition, the amount and size of military equipment grew. The Guard eventually replaced most of its so-called "60-man" armories like St. Peter's.

The St. Peter Armory was used by the National Guard until about 1983 when a new armory was completed at the northern edge of the city. The former armory became a sales office for an athletic equipment manufacturer. The Armory was added to the National Register of Historic Places in 1997. In March 2014 the property was for sale.

== See also ==
- National Register of Historic Places listings in Nicollet County, Minnesota
