= Emily and Stephen Schumacher House =

Historic house in Minnesota, United States

- Emilie and Stephen Schumacher House
- U.S. National Register of Historic Places
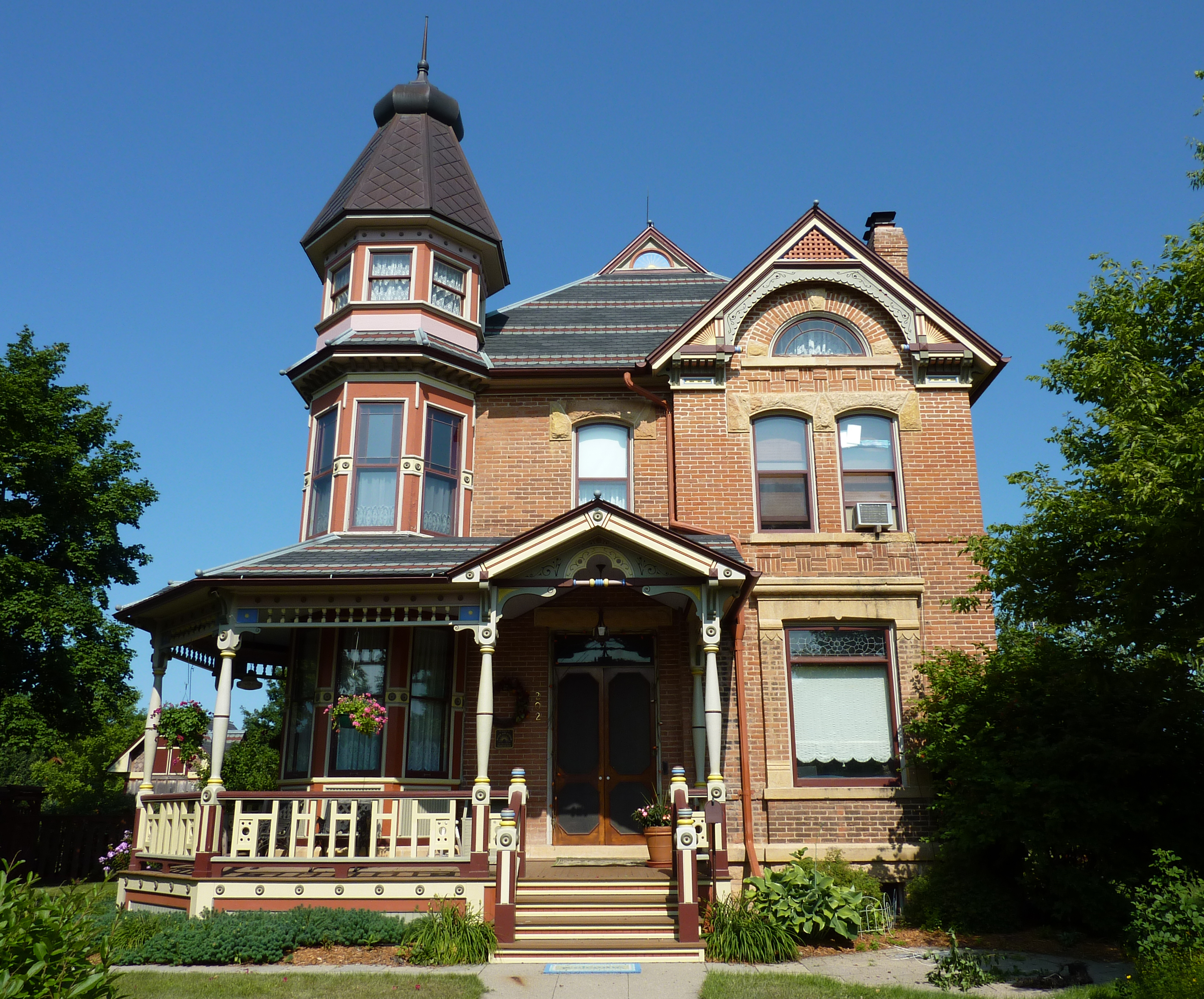
- Emilie and Stephen Schumacher Home, 2009

- Location within Minnesota Location within the United States
- Location: 202 3rd St. N, St. Peter, Minnesota
- Coordinates: 44°19′40″N 93°57′21″W
- Area: less than one acre
- Built: 1887
- Architect: Henry C. Gerlach
- Architectural style: Queen Anne
- NRHP reference No.: 00001507
- Added to NRHP: December 13, 2000

The Emilie and Stephen Schumacher House is a historic home located in St. Peter, Minnesota, United States. Designed in the Queen Anne style, it was built for a local merchant named Stephen Shumacher and completed in 1887. The home was designed by Henry Gerlach, a Mankato-based architect who designed many residential and commercial buildings in the surrounding area.

After being passed on to the Schumacher's descendants the home was sold in 1967 (though it remained a private home). During the 1998 Comfrey–St. Peter tornado outbreak the home was badly damaged including the complete loss of the home's turret, roof and porch. In a yearlong restoration project aided by the Minnesota Historical Society the home was meticulously restored. The home was added to the National Register of Historic Places in 2000 as an excellent local example of a Queen Anne style home.
