= Eugene Saint Julien Cox House =

Historic house in Minnesota, United States

Coordinates: 44°19′55″N 93°57′40″W

- U.S. National Register of Historic Places
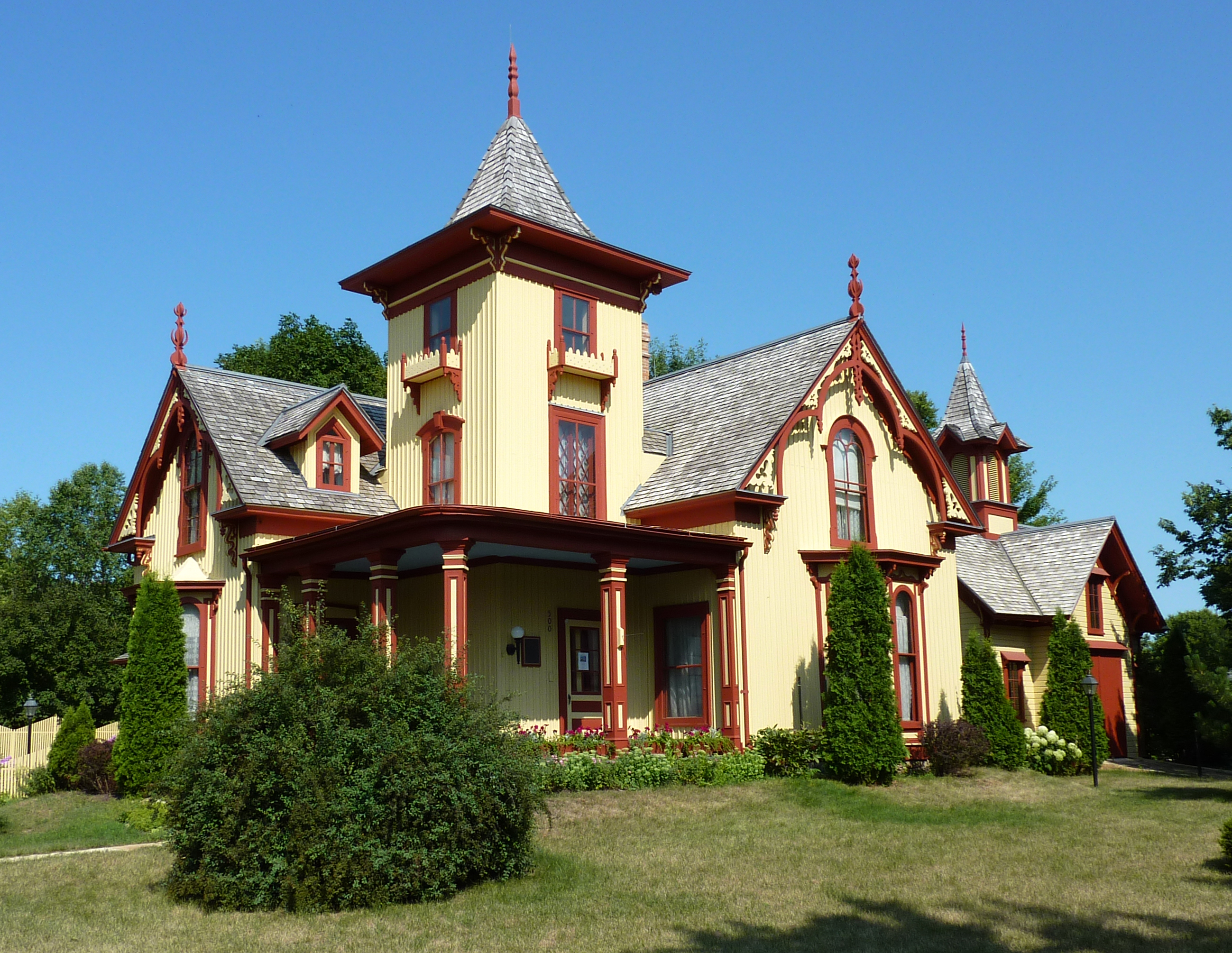
- Location: 500 N. Washington Ave; St. Peter, MN
- NRHP reference No.: 70000305
- Added to NRHP: November 20, 1970

The Eugene Saint Julien Cox House, now known as the E. St. Julien Cox House, is a Carpenter Gothic-style house in St. Peter, Minnesota, United States. It was built in 1871 for Eugene Saint Julien Cox, the first mayor of St. Peter, and his family. It was listed on the National Register of Historic Places on November 20, 1970.

The building has been restored inside and out to its late 19th-century appearance by the Nicollet County Historical Society, which opens it as a house museum a few days per week during the summer.
