= Minnesota Security Hospital =

- State of Minnesota
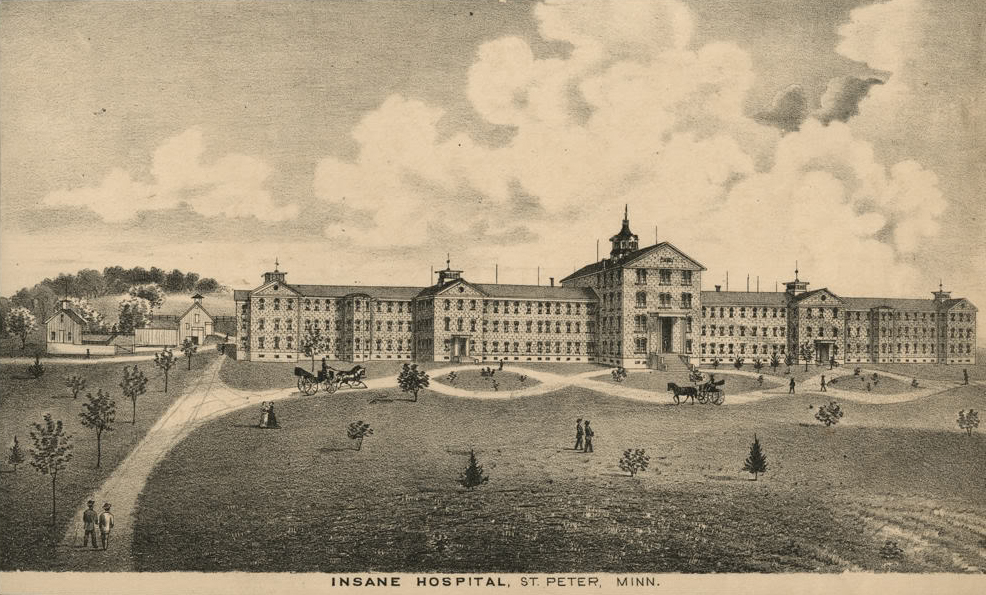
- St. Peter State Hospital, 1874 lithograph

Geography
- Location: St. Peter, Minnesota, United States
- Coordinates: 44.307958°N 93.982136°W

History
- Former name: St. Peter State Hospital
- Opened: December 6, 1866 St. Peter State Hospital; 1957 Minnesota Security Hospital

Links
- Lists: Hospitals in Minnesota

The Minnesota Security Hospital is a secure psychiatric hospital located in St. Peter, Minnesota. It serves people who have been committed by the court as mentally ill and dangerous. It was established as St. Peter State Hospital in 1866 under the Kirkbride Plan. The original building is mostly demolished though the hospital is still active.

== History ==
In 1866, the Minnesota Legislature approved the building of a state hospital for the insane, hoping to reduce the growing amount of mentally ill people in jails throughout the state. They first had to find an area willing to deed 20 acres (8.1 ha) of land for the hospital. St. Peter leaders bought a 210-acre (85 ha) farm for $7,000 and lent it to the state.

The hospital was constructed in 1866 in the Kirkbride design. A fire destroyed the men's ward of the hospital on November 15, 1880. C. K. Bartlett was the superintendent of the hospital in its early years before his resignation in 1894.

Its first patient checked on December 6, 1866. The hospital soon became overcrowded, so the state built 3 other facilities in Rochester, Fergus Falls, and Anoka. The St. Peter location remained the main hospital. Other hospitals also opened to reduce the population of patients but either closed or turned into retirement homes for the elderly.

In 1911, the Asylum for Dangerous Insane officially opened on the campus of the St. Peter Hospital. The name was later changed to the Minnesota Security Hospital (MSH) in 1957.

After the attempted assassination of Bishop Patrick Heffron of the Diocese of Winona, Reverend Louis M. Lescher was committed to this hospital until his death in 1943.

In 1982, the current MSH building opened. The original hospital has since been demolished. The coordinates of the original hospital are 44°18′17″N 93°58′36″W.

== Records ==
Records documenting the population and activities in the security hospital, including admission and transfer book (1911–1938), admissions index (1911–1963), daily movement of population record, dangerous insane (1911–1913), and scrapbook (1937–1987) kept by longtime medical director Charles G. Sheppard are available for research use.

== Bibliography ==
- "State Services". Minnesota Department of Human Services. Archived from the original on February 20, 2006.
- Hurd, Henry Mills, ed. (1916). The Institutional Care of the Insane in the United States and Canada. Vol. 2. Johns Hopkins Press. p. 434. ISBN 9780405052101 – via Google Books.
