= Eugene Saint Julien Cox =

American politician

Captain Eugene Saint Julien Cox
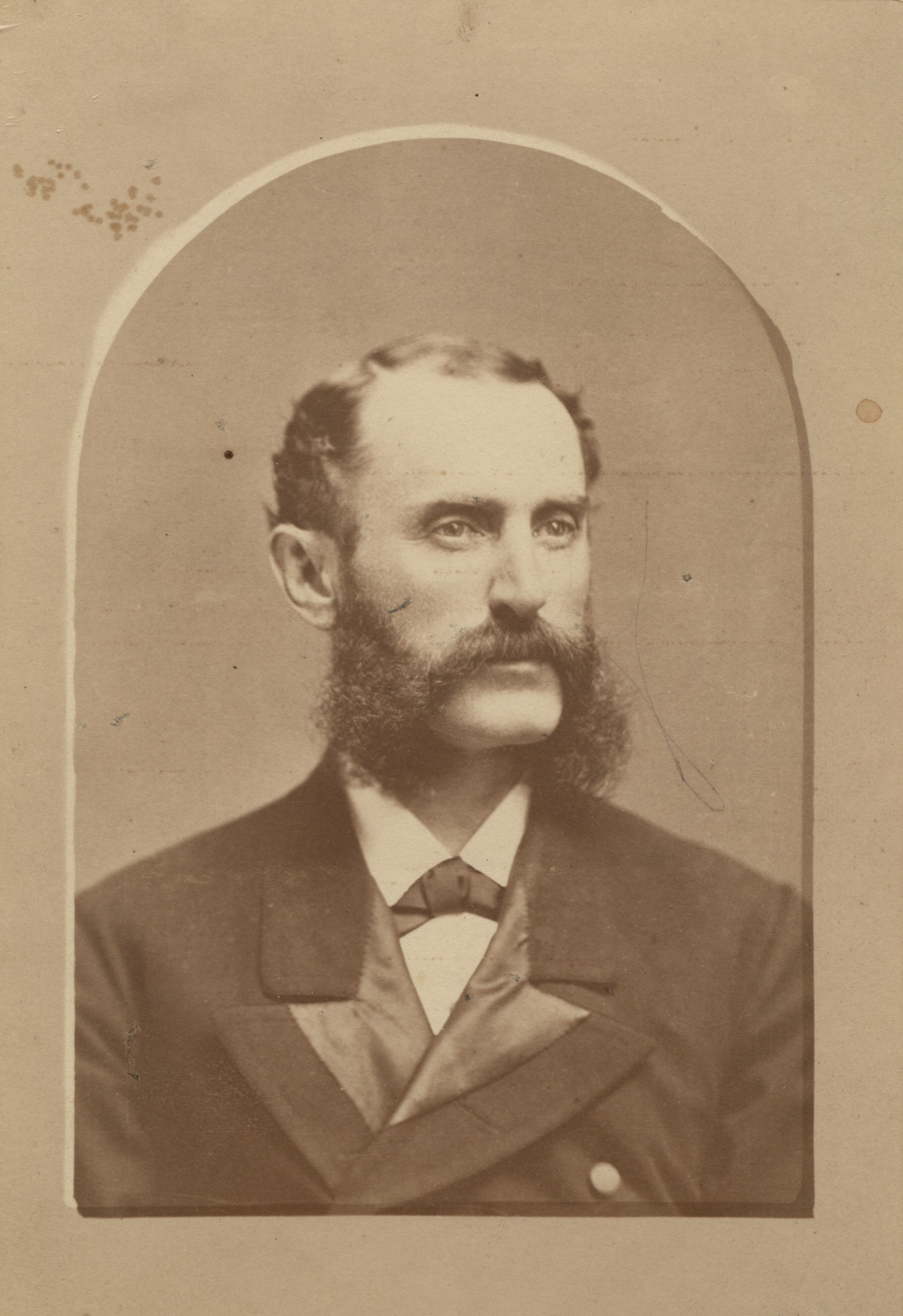
- Portrait of E. St. Julien Cox, New Ulm, Minnesota.
- Born: February 21, 1834; Easton, Pennsylvania
- Died: November 3, 1898 (aged 64); Los Angeles, California
- Burial place: Evergreen Cemetery, Los Angeles, California
- Education: Episcopal Academy
- Spouse: Mariah Herman Mayhew
- Children: 6
- Military career
- Allegiance: Union Army
- Branch: United States Army
- Service years: 1861-1863
- Rank: Captain
- Units: 2nd Minnesota Infantry Regiment; 1st Minnesota Cavalry Regiment
- Commands: Company E, 1st Minnesota Cavalry Regiment
- Conflicts: American Civil War: Battle of Mill Springs; Sioux Wars: Battle of Big Mound; Battle of Dead Buffalo Lake; Battle of Stony Lake
- Other work: Lawyer; Member of the Minnesota Legislature; Member of the Minnesota House of Representatives; Member of the Minnesota State Senate

Eugene Saint Julien Cox (February 21, 1834 – November 3, 1898) was a prominent citizen of St. Peter, Minnesota, a politician, lawyer, and veteran of both the American Civil War and the Sioux Wars. Cox is one of only a few Minnesota politicians to be impeached out of office by the Minnesota House of Representatives.

== Early life ==
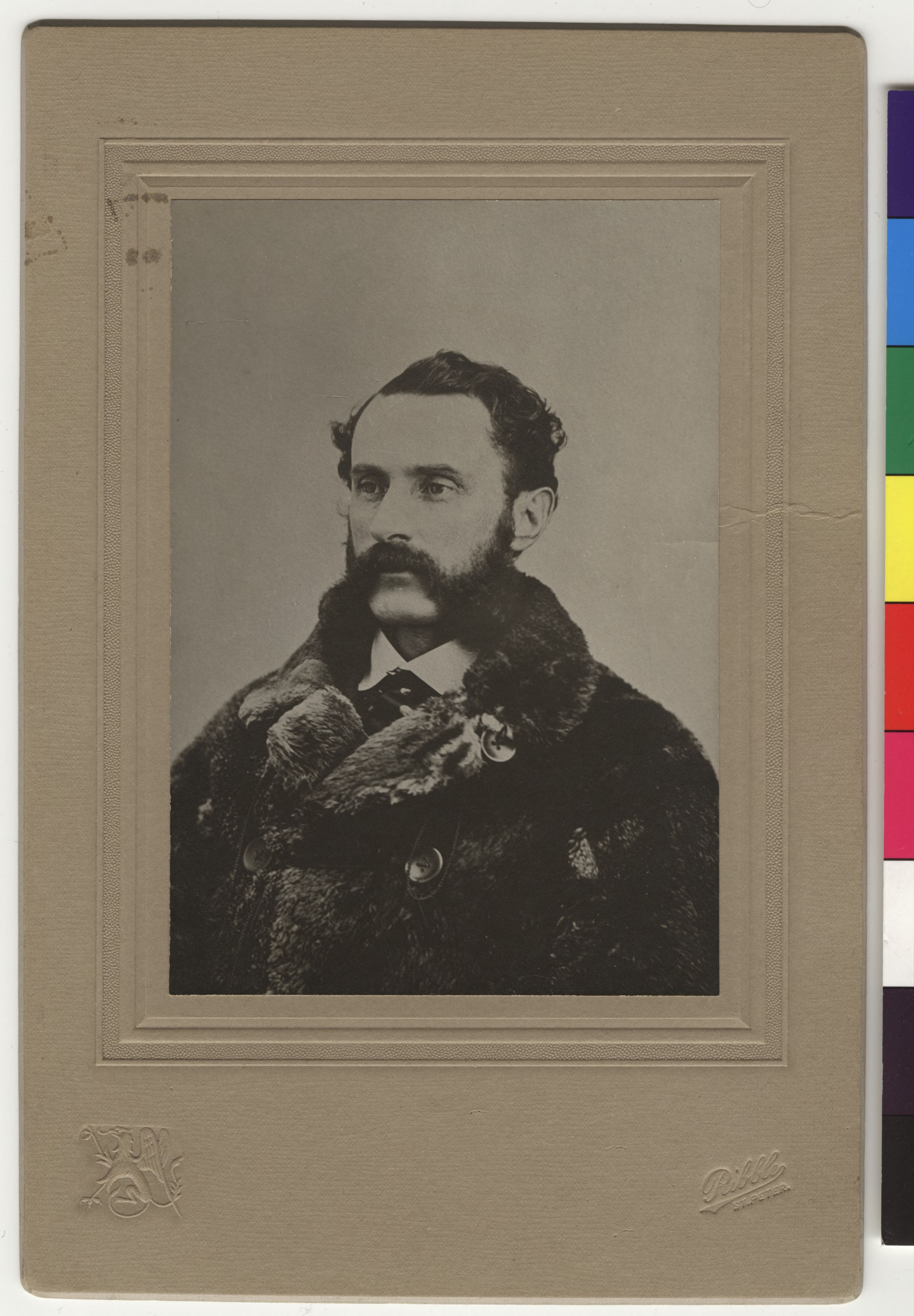
Portrait of Eugene Saint Julien Cox of St. Peter, Minnesota. Courtesy of the Nicollet County Historical Society.

Cox was born in Easton, Pennsylvania, just after his parents returned to the United States, after spending sixteen years in Europe. Some sources identify Cox as born while abroad in Switzerland. Cox was educated at the Episcopal Academy in Philadelphia and later studied law under George M. Wharton of Philadelphia, and Alex Randall of Chicago before being admitted to the Wisconsin bar examination in 1854. Cox later practiced law in St. Peter, Minnesota and served as the city's first municipal mayor from 1865-1867.

== Military Service ==
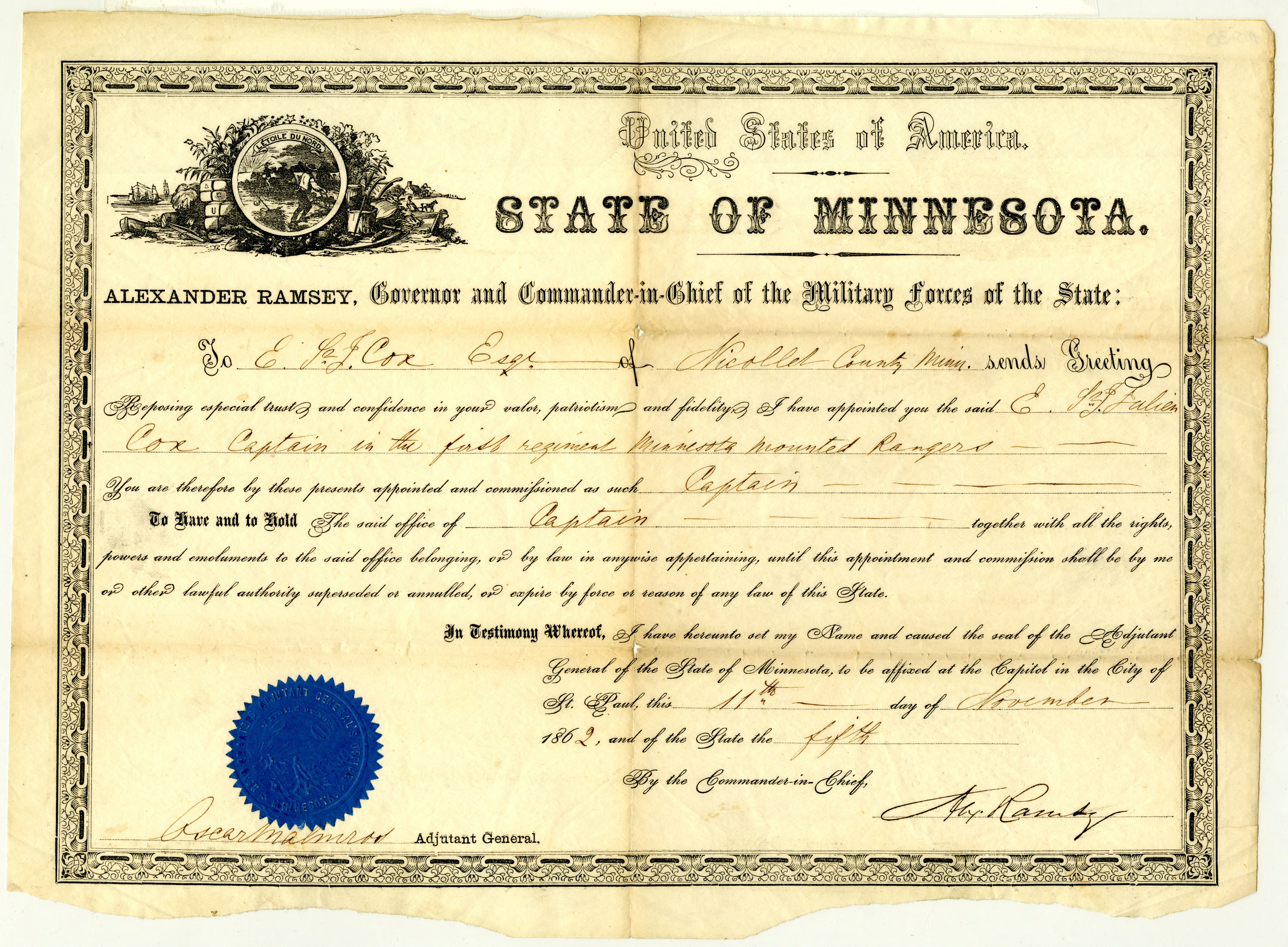
Eugene St. Julien Cox's appointment as a Captain in the 1st Minnesota Cavalry Regiment.

At the outbreak of the American Civil War Cox volunteered for service in the Union Army. Cox had belonged to a local Militia in St. Peter, Minnesota known as the "St. Peter Guards" under the command of Norwegian American Asgrim Knutson Skaro, also of St. Peter. Cox was appointed as the First lieutenant of Company E of the 2nd Minnesota Infantry Regiment under the command of Skaro. Cox would serve with the 2nd Minnesota until resigning his commission on February 8, 1862 following the Battle of Mill Springs. Following the Dakota War of 1862 Cox re-enlisted in the Union Army and was appointed as the Captain of Company E of the 1st Minnesota Cavalry Regiment which fought in the Sioux Wars at the Battle of Big Mound, the Battle of Dead Buffalo Lake, and the Battle of Stony Lake.

== Political career ==
In the postwar era Cox served in the Minnesota House of Representatives in 1873 as a Democrat and then served in the Minnesota State Senate in 1874 and 1875. Cox served as a Minnesota district court judge from 1877 to 1882.

While serving as a judge of Minnesota's Ninth Judicial District, Cox was impeached by the Minnesota House of Representatives in 1881. The central allegation was that he had been intoxicated while in court. From January 1882 through March, his impeachment trial was held before the Minnesota Senate. While he was acquitted on most of the twenty articles of impeachment that were brought against him, he was found guilty of seven charges and thereby removed from office.

== Personal life ==
Cox married Mariah Herman Mayhew (1837-1931) in Oconomowoc, Wisconsin on September 14, 1856, together they had 6 children; 2 boys and 4 girls. One of Cox's children, Lillian Mayhew Cox-Gault (1864-1963) was the first female mayor of a city, and the first female mayor in Minnesota, serving as the mayor of St. Peter, Minnesota from 1921 to 1922.

== Later life and death ==
Around 1896 Cox moved to Los Angeles, California and continued to practice law. While in California Cox was an active member of the Grand Army of the Republic and was a member of Barrett-Logan Post 6 of the G.A.R. Cox died on November 3, 1898 in Los Angeles, California of oral cancer.

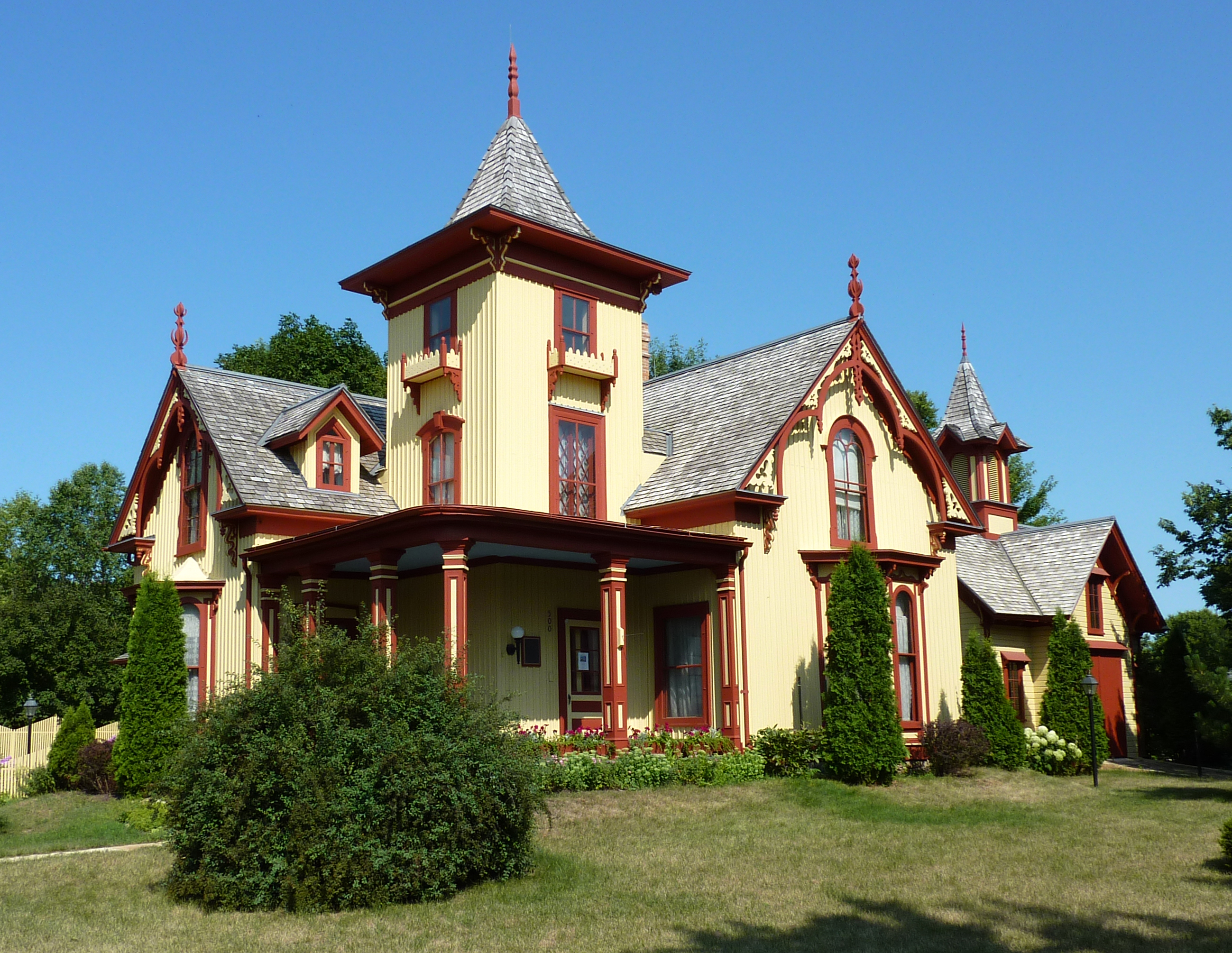
The Eugene Saint Julien Cox House, now a museum, St. Peter, Minnesota, USA.

== Legacy ==
The Eugene Saint Julien Cox House still stands today in St. Peter, Minnesota. Cox's home was listed on the National Register of Historic Places on November 20, 1970. According to the Nicollet County Historical Society Cox's home is one of the few fully restored Carpenter Gothic cottages in Minnesota.
