= St. Peter, Minnesota =

City in Minnesota, United States

- City
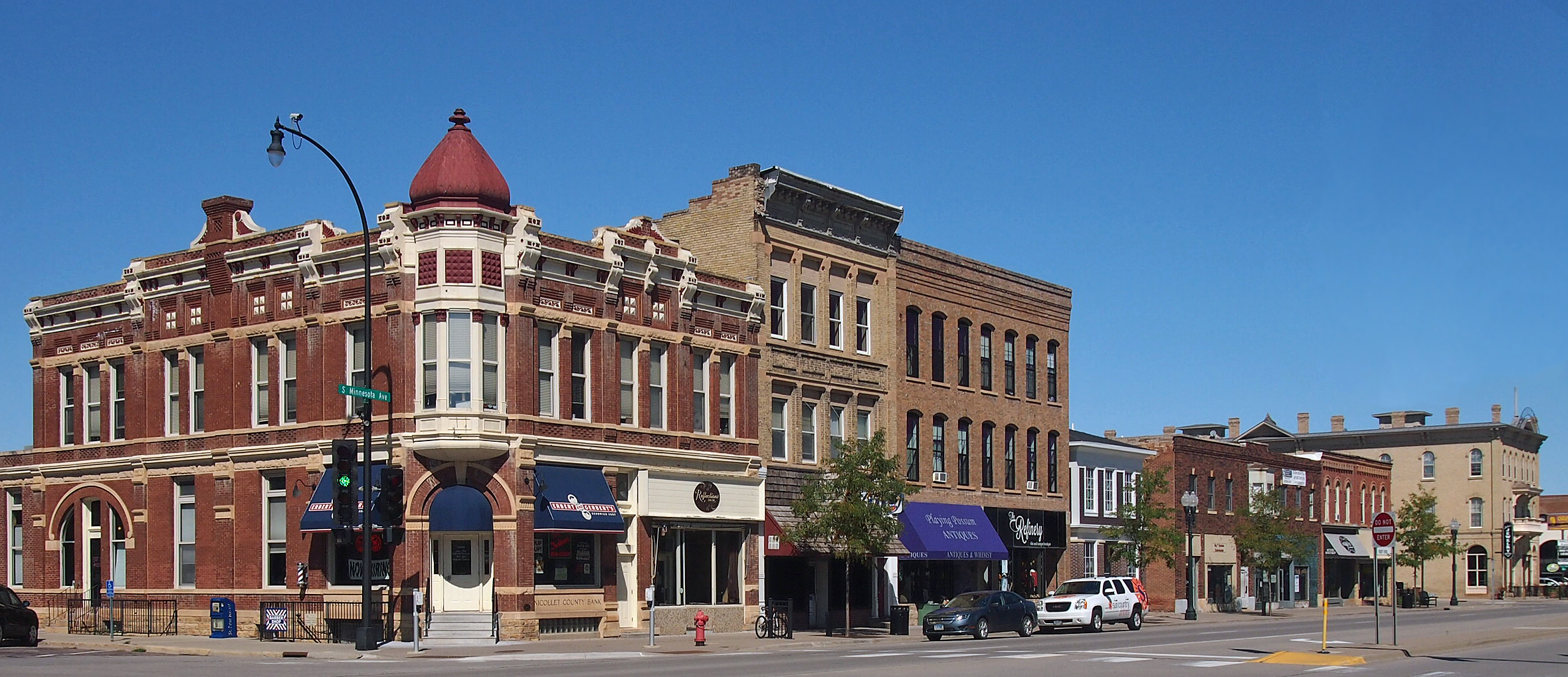
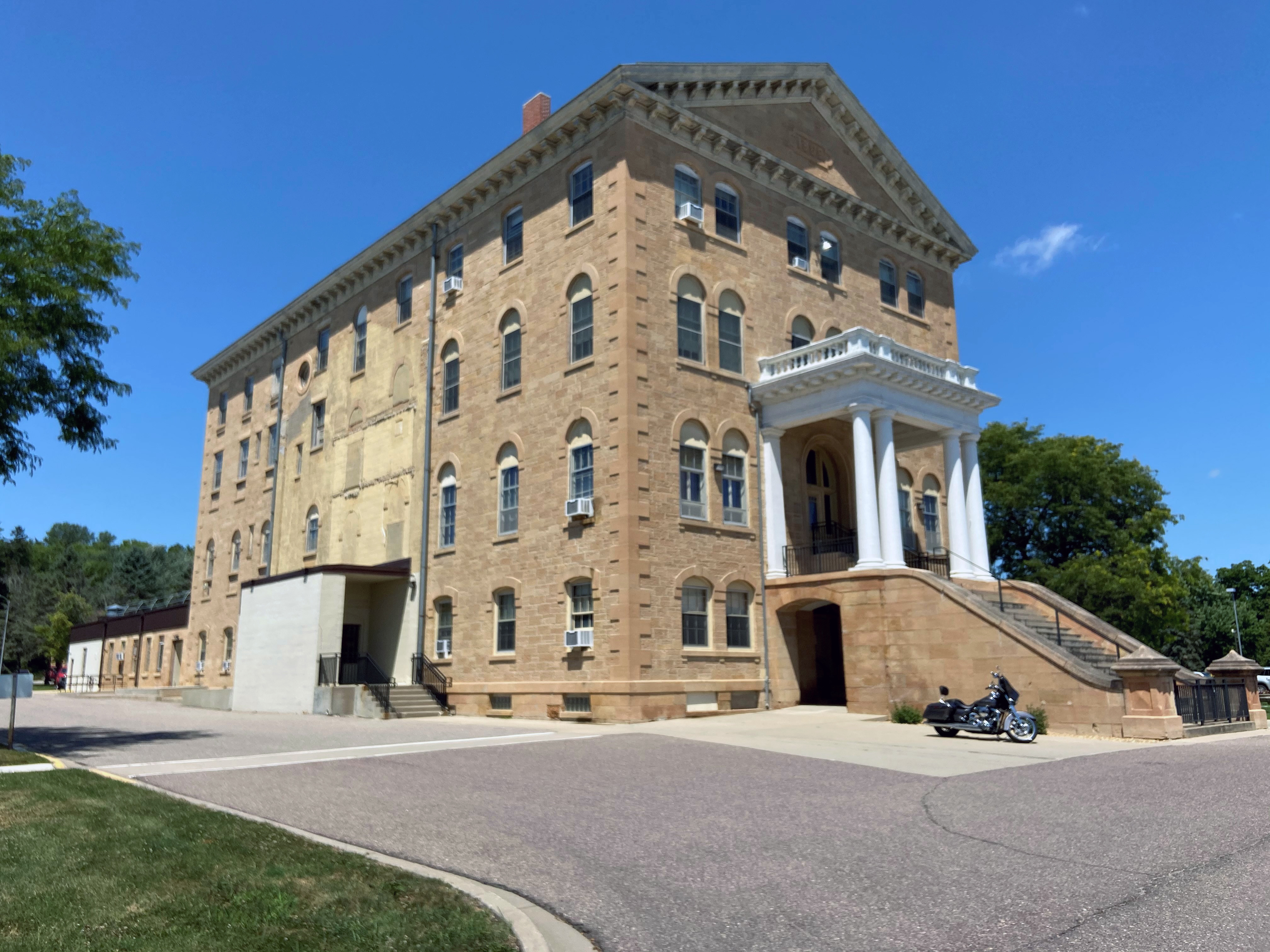
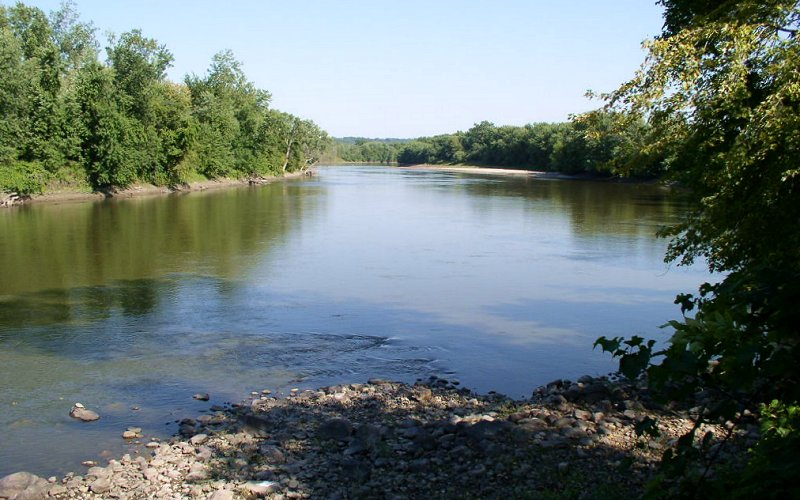
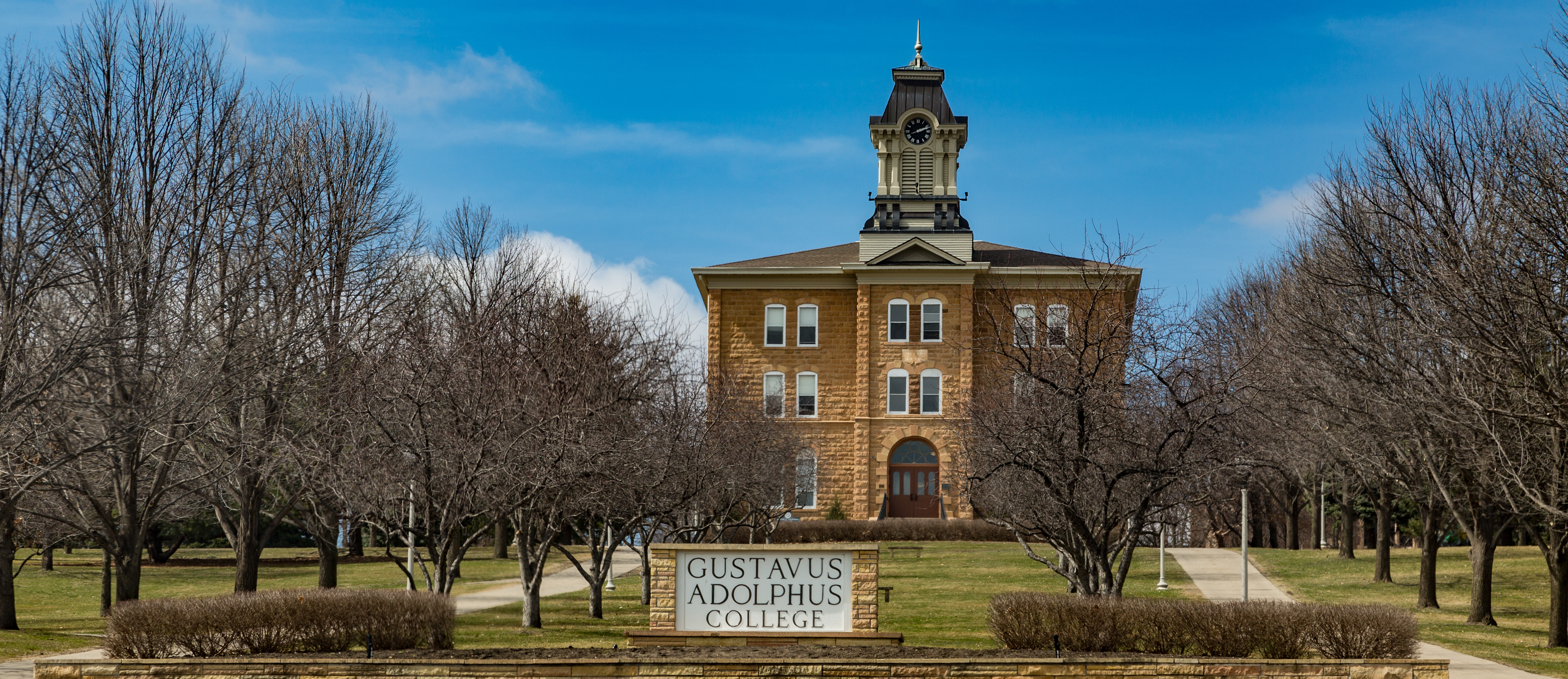
- Downtown St. Peter St. Peter State Hospital Museum Traverse Des Sioux Gustavus Adolphus College
- Motto: "Where History & Progress Meet"
- Location of St. Peter, Minnesota
- Coordinates: 44°19′46.19″N 93°57′57.01″W
- Country: United States
- State: Minnesota
- County: Nicollet
- Founded: 1853
- Incorporated: January 7, 1873
- Founder: Captain William Bigelow Dodd

Government
  - Type: Mayor–Council
  - Mayor: Shanon Nowell
  - City Council: Ben Ranft; Keri Johnson; Darrell Pettis; Dustin J. Sharstrom; Bradley DeVos; Josh Weisenfeld

Area
  - City: 6.240 sq mi (16.162 km^{2})
  - Land: 6.066 sq mi (15.710 km^{2})
  - Water: 0.175 sq mi (0.454 km^{2})
- Elevation: 850 ft (259 m)

Population (2020)
  - City: 12,066
  - Estimate (2023): 12,291
  - Density: 2,026/sq mi (782.4/km^{2})
  - Metro: 104,248 (US: 352nd)
- Time zone: UTC−6 (Central (CST))
  - Summer (DST): UTC−5 (CDT)
- ZIP Code: 56082
- Area codes: 507 and 924
- FIPS code: 27-58036
- GNIS feature ID: 2396517
- Sales tax: 7.875%
- Website: saintpetermn.gov

St. Peter is a city and the county seat of Nicollet County, Minnesota, United States. It lies 10 miles north of Mankato and is the third largest city in the Mankato metropolitan area. The population was 12,066 at the 2020 census. It is home to Gustavus Adolphus College.

U.S. Highway 169 and Minnesota State Highways 22 and 99 are three of the city's main routes. St. Peter is known for being located on the scenic Minnesota River valley, being home to the St. Peter State Hospital Museum, the Traverse Des Sioux historic site and the St. Peter Armory. Also, St. Peter's sister city is Petatlán, Guerrero, Mexico.

== Geography ==
St. Peter is located at 44°19′46.19″N 93°57′57.01″W (44.3294980, -93.9658367).

According to the United States Census Bureau, the city has a total area of 6.240 square miles (16.16 km^{2}), of which 6.065 square miles (15.71 km^{2}) is land and 0.175 square miles (0.45 km^{2}) is water.

=== Climate ===
Climate data for St. Peter, Minnesota, 1991–2020 normals, extremes 1893–present
Month	Jan	Feb	Mar	Apr	May	Jun	Jul	Aug	Sep	Oct	Nov	Dec	Year
Record high °F (°C)	65 (18)	68 (20)	92 (33)	94 (34)	107 (42)	104 (40)	109 (43)	104 (40)	103 (39)	92 (33)	81 (27)	69 (21)	109 (43)
Mean maximum °F (°C)	42.8 (6.0)	47.9 (8.8)	65.4 (18.6)	79.9 (26.6)	88.9 (31.6)	92.5 (33.6)	93.1 (33.9)	90.7 (32.6)	88.7 (31.5)	81.9 (27.7)	63.9 (17.7)	47.2 (8.4)	95.5 (35.3)
Mean daily maximum °F (°C)	21.9 (−5.6)	26.7 (−2.9)	39.9 (4.4)	54.8 (12.7)	67.8 (19.9)	77.8 (25.4)	81.9 (27.7)	79.4 (26.3)	72.2 (22.3)	58.2 (14.6)	41.8 (5.4)	27.5 (−2.5)	54.2 (12.3)
Daily mean °F (°C)	12.5 (−10.8)	16.8 (−8.4)	30.3 (−0.9)	43.9 (6.6)	57.0 (13.9)	67.4 (19.7)	71.5 (21.9)	69.1 (20.6)	60.4 (15.8)	46.8 (8.2)	32.2 (0.1)	19.2 (−7.1)	43.9 (6.6)
Mean daily minimum °F (°C)	3.1 (−16.1)	6.9 (−13.9)	20.6 (−6.3)	32.9 (0.5)	46.3 (7.9)	57.0 (13.9)	61.2 (16.2)	58.8 (14.9)	48.7 (9.3)	35.4 (1.9)	22.7 (−5.2)	10.9 (−11.7)	33.7 (1.0)
Mean minimum °F (°C)	−18.1 (−27.8)	−11.4 (−24.1)	−0.5 (−18.1)	19.6 (−6.9)	32.9 (0.5)	44.8 (7.1)	51.4 (10.8)	48.3 (9.1)	35.0 (1.7)	22.3 (−5.4)	7.3 (−13.7)	−10.3 (−23.5)	−19.9 (−28.8)
Record low °F (°C)	−40 (−40)	−36 (−38)	−30 (−34)	−5 (−21)	14 (−10)	32 (0)	34 (1)	34 (1)	21 (−6)	4 (−16)	−22 (−30)	−32 (−36)	−40 (−40)
Average precipitation inches (mm)	0.96 (24)	0.96 (24)	1.79 (45)	3.06 (78)	4.04 (103)	5.13 (130)	4.41 (112)	3.56 (90)	3.16 (80)	2.50 (64)	1.68 (43)	1.17 (30)	32.42 (823)
Average snowfall inches (cm)	8.8 (22)	8.2 (21)	4.2 (11)	2.7 (6.9)	0.0 (0.0)	0.0 (0.0)	0.0 (0.0)	0.0 (0.0)	0.0 (0.0)	0.2 (0.51)	3.2 (8.1)	10.6 (27)	37.9 (96.51)
Average precipitation days (≥ 0.01 in)	5.0	4.3	5.9	8.2	10.2	10.6	8.9	8.0	7.0	6.8	4.7	5.3	84.9
Average snowy days (≥ 0.1 in)	4.3	3.1	1.5	0.6	0.0	0.0	0.0	0.0	0.0	0.1	1.7	3.5	14.8
Source 1: NOAA
Source 2: National Weather Service

== Demographics ==
Historical population
Census	Pop.	Note	%±
1870	2,124		—
1880	3,436		61.8%
1890	3,671		6.8%
1900	4,302		17.2%
1910	4,176		−2.9%
1920	4,335		3.8%
1930	4,811		11.0%
1940	5,870		22.0%
1950	7,754		32.1%
1960	8,484		9.4%
1970	8,339		−1.7%
1980	9,056		8.6%
1990	9,421		4.0%
2000	9,747		3.5%
2010	11,196		14.9%
2020	12,066		7.8%
2023 (est.)	12,291		1.9%
U.S. Decennial Census; 2020 Census

As of the 2023 American Community Survey, there are 4,014 estimated households in St. Peter with an average of 2.25 persons per household. The city has a median household income of $65,042. Approximately 17.5% of the city's population lives at or below the poverty line. St. Peter has an estimated 65.5% employment rate, with 31.3% of the population holding a bachelor's degree or higher and 90.2% holding a high school diploma.

The top five reported ancestries (people were allowed to report up to two ancestries, thus the figures will generally add to more than 100%) were English (87.5%), Spanish (5.4%), Indo-European (2.1%), Asian and Pacific Islander (0.7%), and Other (4.3%).

The median age in the city was 35.0 years.

=== Racial and ethnic composition ===
St. Peter, Minnesota – racial and ethnic composition Note: the US Census treats Hispanic/Latino as an ethnic category. This table excludes Latinos from the racial categories and assigns them to a separate category. Hispanics/Latinos may be of any race.
Race / ethnicity (NH = non-Hispanic)	Pop. 2000	Pop. 2010	Pop. 2020	% 2000	% 2010	% 2020
White alone (NH)	9,037	9,698	9,451	92.72%	86.62%	78.33%
Black or African American alone (NH)	152	367	855	1.56%	3.28%	7.09%
Native American or Alaska Native alone (NH)	26	47	88	0.27%	0.42%	0.73%
Asian alone (NH)	147	179	291	1.51%	1.60%	2.41%
Pacific Islander alone (NH)	2	0	9	0.02%	0.00%	0.07%
Other race alone (NH)	4	6	16	0.04%	0.05%	0.13%
Mixed race or multiracial (NH)	83	181	301	0.85%	1.62%	2.49%
Hispanic or Latino (any race)	296	718	1,055	3.04%	6.41%	8.74%
Total	9,747	11,196	12,066	100.00%	100.00%	100.00%

=== 2020 census ===
As of the 2020 census, there were 12,066 people, 3,708 households, and 2,269 families residing in the city. The population density was 1,989.8 inhabitants per square mile (768.3/km^{2}). The median age was 31.9 years, with 20.3% of residents under age 18 and 14.8% age 65 or older. For every 100 females, there were 97.5 males, and for every 100 females age 18 and over, there were 95.1 males.

94.5% of residents lived in urban areas, while 5.5% lived in rural areas.

Among households, 32.2% had children under the age of 18 living in them. Of all households, 44.9% were married-couple households, 16.9% were households with a male householder and no spouse or partner present, and 29.9% were households with a female householder and no spouse or partner present. About 31.5% of all households were made up of individuals, and 13.8% had someone living alone who was 65 years of age or older.

There were 3,902 housing units at an average density of 643.4 per square mile (248.4/km^{2}). Of the housing units, 5.0% were vacant; the homeowner vacancy rate was 1.7% and the rental vacancy rate was 2.7%.

=== 2010 census ===
As of the 2010 census, there were 11,196 people, 3,491 households, and 2,150 families residing in the city. The population density was 2,003.0 inhabitants per square mile (773.4/km^{2}). There were 3,697 housing units at an average density of 661.4 per square mile (255.4/km^{2}). The racial makeup of the city was 90.13% White, 3.3% African American, 0.57% Native American, 1.61% Asian, 0.00% Pacific Islander, 2.35% from some other races and 2.05% from two or more races. Hispanic or Latino people of any race were 6.41% of the population.

There were 3,491 households, of which 32.1% had children under the age of 18 living with them, 46.2% were married couples living together, 11.8% had a female householder with no husband present, 3.6% had a male householder with no wife present, and 38.4% were non-families. 29.9% of all households were made up of individuals, and 12.3% had someone living alone who was 65 years of age or older. The average household size was 2.44 and the average family size was 2.99.

The median age in the city was 27.5 years. 19.4% of residents were under the age of 18; 27.1% were between the ages of 18 and 24; 22% were from 25 to 44; 19.9% were from 45 to 64; and 11.6% were 65 years of age or older. The gender makeup of the city was 49.5% male and 50.5% female.

=== 2000 census ===
As of the 2000 census, there were 9,747 people, 2,978 households, and 1,843 families residing in the city. The population density was 1,797.3 inhabitants per square mile (693.9/km^{2}). There were 3,129 housing units at an average density of 577.0 per square mile (222.8/km^{2}). The racial makeup of the city was 94.17% White, 1.57% African American, 0.43% Native American, 1.53% Asian, 0.03% Pacific Islander, 1.25% from some other races and 1.02% from two or more races. Hispanic or Latino people of any race were 3.04% of the population.

There were 2,978 households, out of which 32.0% had children under the age of 18 living with them, 48.7% were married couples living together, 9.8% had a female householder with no husband present, and 38.1% were non-families. 28.7% of all households were made up of individuals, and 12.8% had someone living alone who was 65 years of age or older. The average household size was 2.46 and the average family size was 2.99.

In the city, the population was spread out, with 19.8% under the age of 18, 30.6% from 18 to 24, 21.3% from 25 to 44, 16.5% from 45 to 64, and 11.8% who were 65 years of age or older. The median age was 25 years. For every 100 females, there were 96.7 males. For every 100 females age 18 and over, there were 93.2 males.

The median income for a household in the city was $40,344, and the median income for a family was $51,157. Males had a median income of $33,618 versus $25,789 for females. The per capita income for the city was $16,634. About 4.2% of families and 11.8% of the population were below the poverty line, including 7.3% of those under age 18 and 10.9% of those age 65 or over.

== History ==
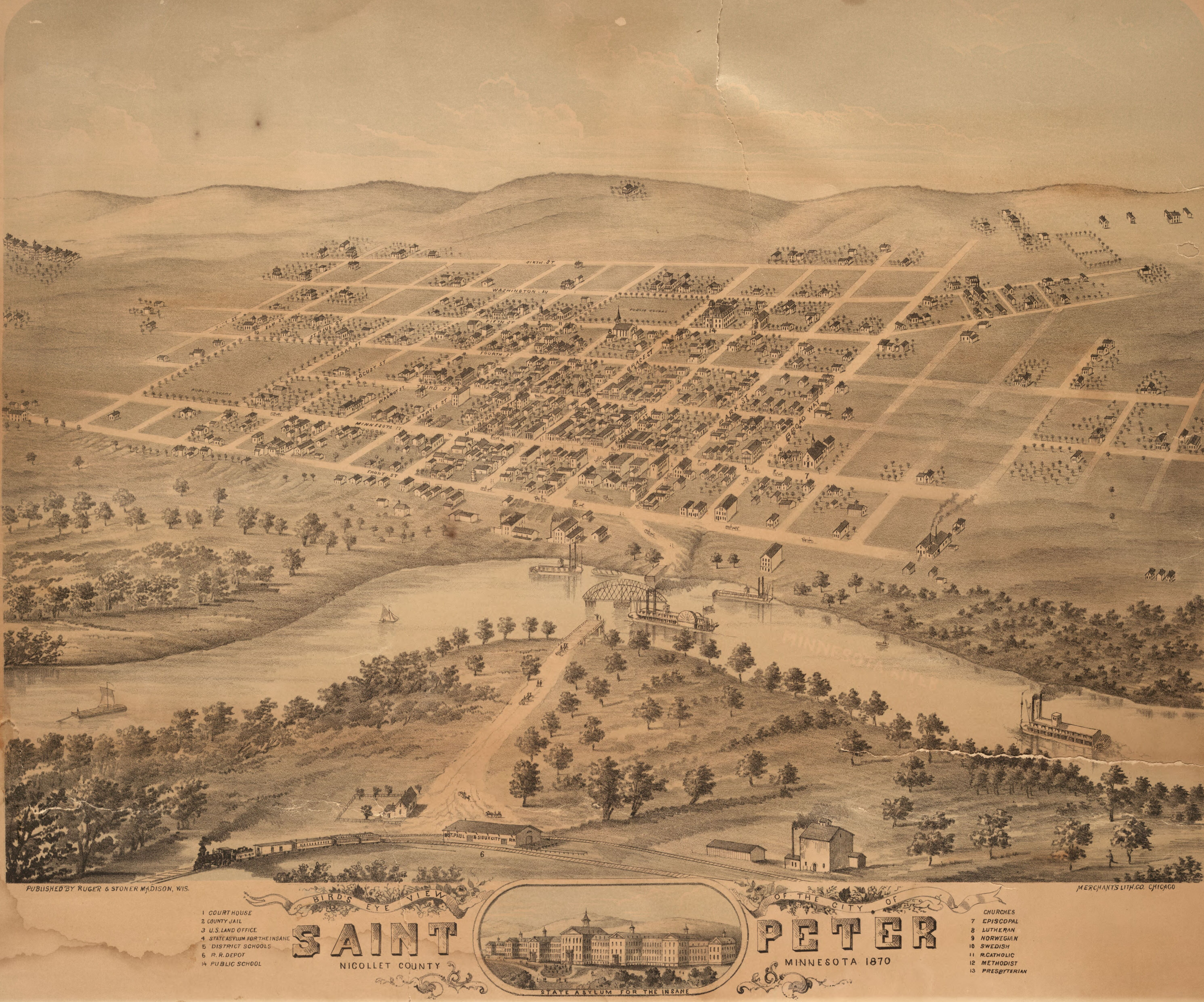
Bird's Eye view, St. Peter, Minnesota, 1870.

St. Peter was founded in 1853 by Captain William Bigelow Dodd, who claimed 150 acres (0.61 km^{2}) north of what is now Broadway Avenue. He named the new settlement Rock Bend because of the rock formation at the bend of the Minnesota River. Daniel L. Turpin platted and surveyed the town site in 1854. In 1855, a group of St. Paul businessmen interested in promoting the town formed the Saint Peter Company, and the town was renamed St. Peter. The president of the company was Willis A. Gorman, Territorial Governor of Minnesota. Many of St. Peter's streets were named after streets in New York City, including Park Row, Chatham, Broadway, Nassau, and Union. Dodd was originally from Bloomfield, New Jersey. His second wife, Harriett Newell Jones, a native of Cabot, Vermont, was living in New York at the time of their marriage at the Church of the Holy Communion in New York City, which helped fund the church in St. Peter that shares its name.

St. Peter was located along the Minnesota River, a major tributary of the Mississippi River, and flowed down a wide valley carved by the Glacial River Warren, when it emptied Lake Agassiz. One mile north of where St. Peter was founded, was Traverse des Sioux, a trading site used by Native Americans from before contact, that later became a major transhipment point for the fur trade, bringing furs from the Red River Valley and the watershed of Lake Winnipeg into the Mississippi River Valley. Traverse des Sioux had been a trading area and a ford over the Minnesota River that had been used by Native Americans before the contact period. During the era of steamships, was the farthest up river that larger steam ships could operate.

The Two Fingers band of Sioux from St Peter's made news in 1855.

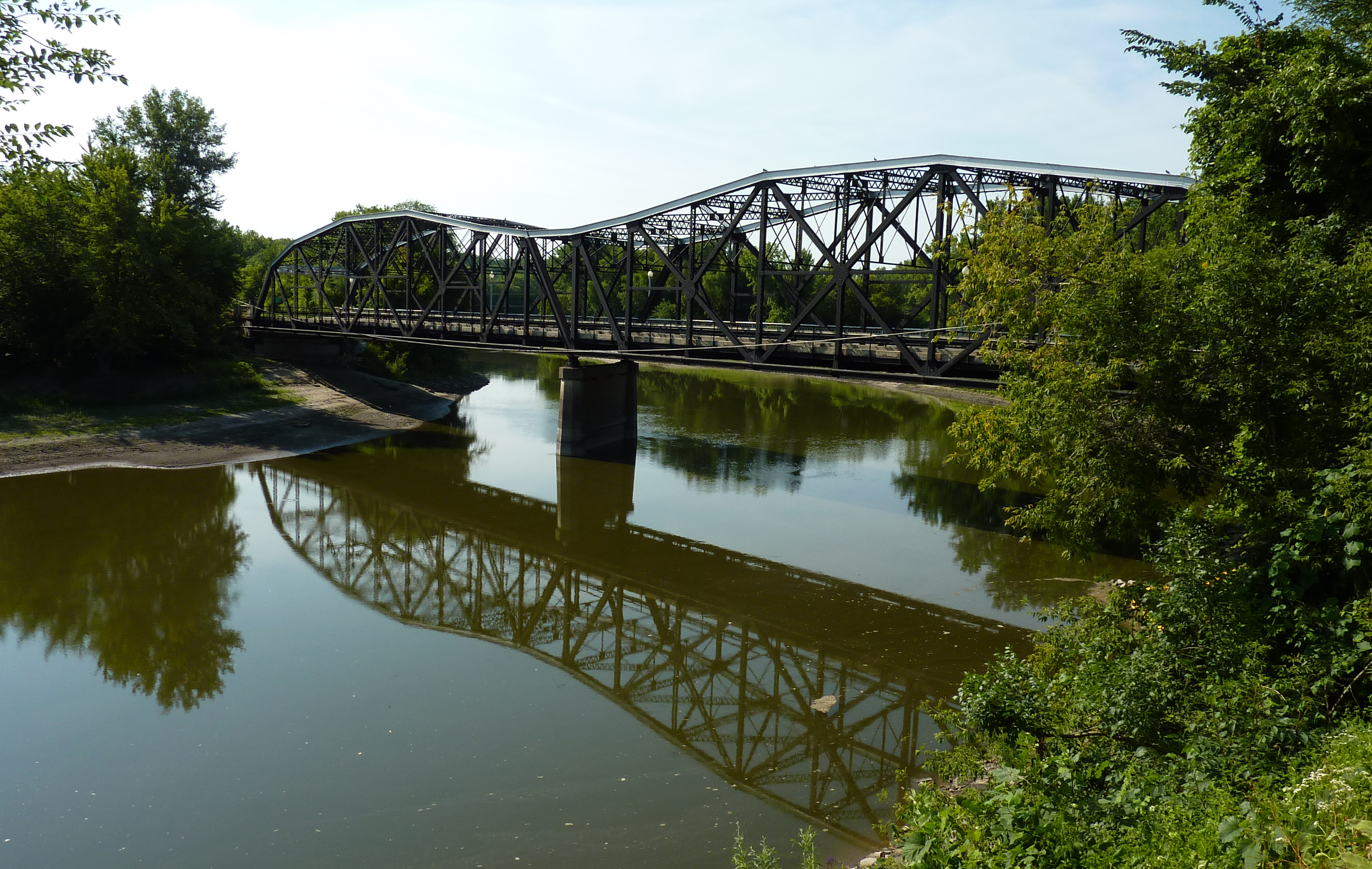
The Broadway Bridge connects St. Peter to the east via Minnesota State Highway 99

In 1857, an attempt was made to move the Territory of Minnesota's capital from St. Paul to St. Peter. Gorman owned the land on which the bill's sponsors wanted to build the new capitol building, and at one point had been heard saying, "If the capitol remains in Saint Paul, the territory is worth millions, and I have nothing." At the time, St. Peter, in the territory's central region, was seen as more accessible to far-flung territorial legislators than St. Paul, which was in the extreme east of the territory, on the east bank of the Mississippi River. A bill passed both houses of the Territorial Legislature and was awaiting Gorman's signature. The chairman of the Territorial Council's Enrolled Bills Committee, Joseph J. Rolette of Pembina, took the bill and hid in a St. Paul hotel, drinking and playing cards with some friends as the city police looked fruitlessly for him, until the end of the legislative session, too late for the bill to be signed. Rolette came into the chamber just as the session ended. Today, St. Paul is the state's second-largest city (after neighboring Minneapolis), while St. Peter is a relatively small rural town.

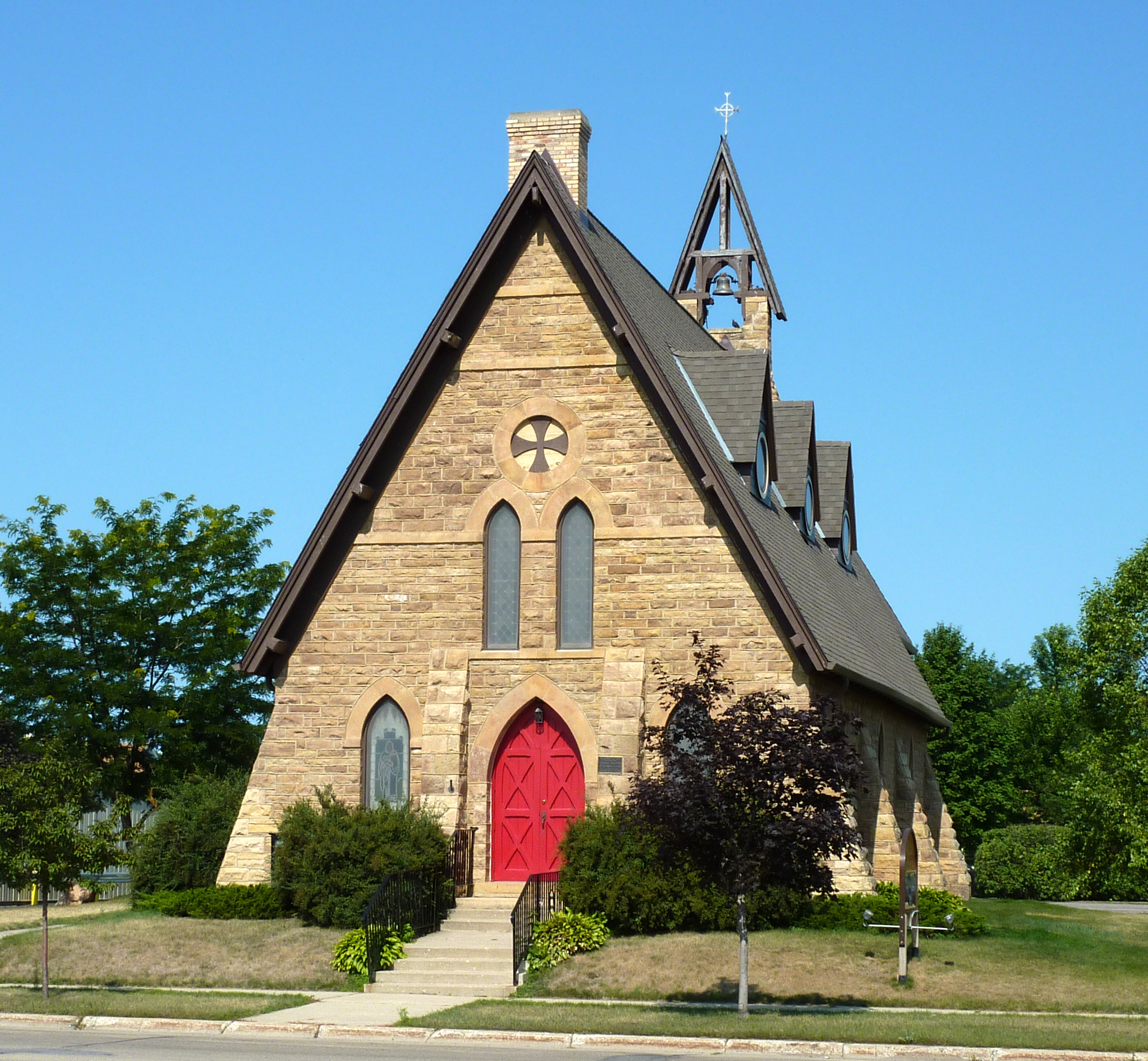
The Church of the Holy Communion is one of several St. Peter structures on the National Register of Historic Places.

In 1851 the Treaty of Traverse des Sioux was signed between the Sioux (Dakota) and the U.S. Government one mile (1.6 km) north of St. Peter. The Nicollet County Historical Society-Treaty Site History Center is near the site of the signing. But the treaty's promises were not kept. The Dakota became angered and the Dakota War of 1862 began in Cottonwood County. In August 1862 the Dakota attacked the German settlement of New Ulm. A company of volunteers from St. Peter, headed by Dodd, St. Peter's founder, went to New Ulm's defense. Dodd was killed on August 23, 1862, and briefly buried in New Ulm. On November 11, 1862, Dodd was buried with high military honors in St. Peter on the grounds of the Church of the Holy Communion, Episcopal, on land he donated to the church. Dodd, his wife Harriet and two children are buried behind the present stone church built in 1869–70 at 118 North Minnesota Avenue.

In 1866, the legislature established the first "Minnesota Asylum for the Insane" in St. Peter. It was later known as the St. Peter State Hospital, and is now called the St. Peter Regional Treatment Center.

On July 1, 1892, the Sontag Brothers, John Sontag and George Contant, and their partner, Chris Evans, tried to rob a train between St. Peter and Kasota along the Minnesota River. The bandits acquired nothing of value, but their activities came under the review of Pinkerton detectives, and both were apprehended in June 1893 in what is called the Battle of Stone Corral in California.

=== Governors ===
St. Peter is known as the home of five governors:

- Territorial
  - Willis Arnold Gorman (1853–1857)
- State
  - Henry Adoniram Swift (1863–1864)
  - Horace Austin (1870–1874)
  - Andrew Ryan McGill (1887–1889)
  - John Albert Johnson (1905–1909)

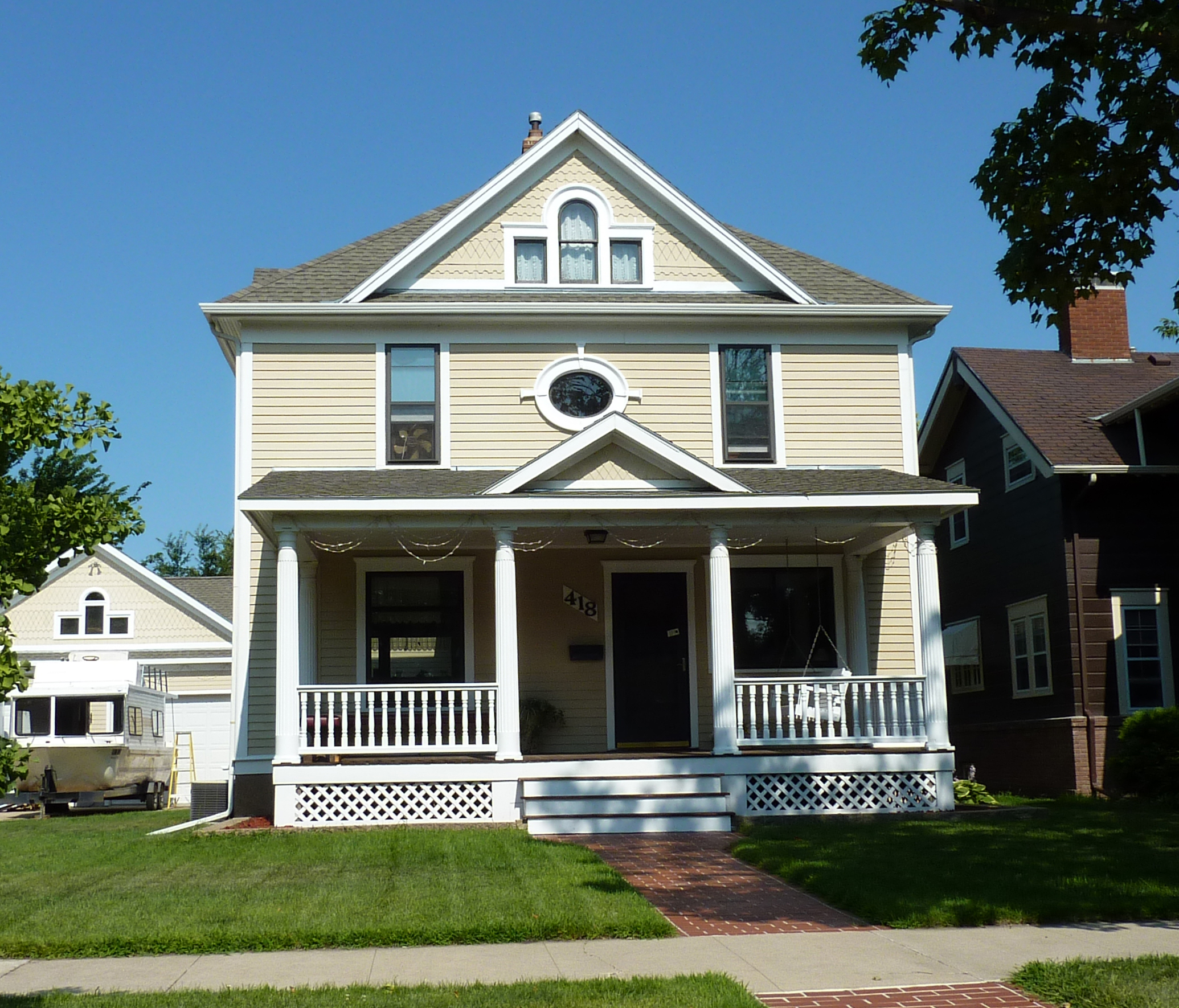
The John A. Johnson House is listed on the NRHP.

The best-known of these, Johnson, was born in St. Peter to Swedish-born parents on July 28, 1861. Because of family circumstances, he offered to help his mother raise the family. He left school at a young age and held a variety of jobs. In 1887, he was hired as editor of the St. Peter Herald, the local newspaper. In 1899, he was elected to the State Senate, and served until 1903. In 1904, he was elected Minnesota's 16th governor. He was reelected in 1906 and 1908. He was considered as a possible candidate in the 1912 presidential election, but died as the result of an operation for intestinal adhesions in Rochester, Minnesota, on September 21, 1909. Drs. William James Mayo and Charles Horace Mayo, who came from Le Sueur and were friends with Johnson, performed the operation. After lying in state in the Capitol rotunda, his body was taken to St. Peter for burial. The funeral, held at Union Presbyterian Church, was St. Peter's largest ever, and he was buried near his parents in Greenhill Cemetery. He was survived by his wife, Elinore "Nora" Preston Johnson.

=== List of mayors of St. Peter, Minnesota ===
#	Mayor	Term
1	Eugene St. Julien Cox (also served in the state legislature and as a district court judge)	1865–1867
2	Francis E. Lange	1868–1869
3	William Schimmell (First president of First National Bank)	1870–1872
4	Albert Knight (Knight Street is named after him)	1873–1875
5	Addison L. Sackett (also served as county auditor and in the state legislature)	1876–1878
6	Azro A. Stone (also served as county sheriff; Stones' Way and Stones' Park are named after him)	1879
7	Philip Dick Sr.	1880–1882
8	Gustav W. Steinke	1883–1884
9	Gideon S. Ives (son-in-law of Governor Henry Adoniram Swift; served as lieutenant governor 1891–1893)	1885
10	Joseph A. Mason	1886–1888
11	Philip Dick Sr. (second term as mayor)	1889–1893
12	Henry Moll (also served as a probate judge)	1894–1895
13	Dr. Lewis M. Erickson	1896–1898
14	Melville G. Hanscome	1899–1900
15	William H. Mueller	1901–1905
16	William H. Rounseville	1906
17	Philip Dick Sr. (third term as mayor)	1907–1909
18	Edward Bornemann	1910–1912
19	Philip E. Dick Jr.	1913–1914
20	Edward Bornemann	1915
21	Adolph Bornemann	1916–1917
22	William Haesecke	1918–1920
23	Lillien M. (Cox) Gault-Wolfe (first woman mayor in Minnesota, daughter of former mayor E. St. Julien Cox)	1921–1922
24	Edward Woehler	1921–1930
25	Dr. Arthur H. Bittner (Died in Office on January 15, 1933)	1931–1933
26	Floyd B. Johnson (athletic field at St. Peter Middle School (formerly St. Peter Middle/High School) is named after him)	1933–1935
27	Otto T. Miller	1936–1937
28	Reuben R. Seibert	1938–1940
29	Otto T. Miller	1941–1942
30	Henry B. Seitzer	1942–1943
31	Andrew Cook (Died in office on October 17, 1944)	1944
32	John R. Faust	1944–1946
33	Henry E. Wiest	1946
34	Clifford J. Nutter	1947–1948
35	Elmer J. Kleifgen	1949–1951
36	Prof. George W. Anderson (English professor at Gustavus Adolphus College)	1951–1952
37	Richard Konechne	1953–1956
38	Leighton R. Swenson	1957–1958
39	Mark W. Schaus	1959–1960
40	George W. Martens	1960–1961
41	Arthur W. Cook	1962–1963
42	Lamar Hay	1964–1965
43	George W. Martens	1966–1970
44	Douglas C. Pyan	1971–1985
45	William A. Wettergren	1986–1989
46	Peter J. Rheaume	1990–1991
47	Ellery O. Peterson	1992–1995
48	Jerry K. Hawbaker	1996–2005
49	Timothy J. Strand (Elected unopposed on November 8, 2011)	2006–2015
50	Chuck Zieman	2016–2021
51	Shanon Nowell (Administrator at Gustavus Adolphus College)	2022–present

=== Tornado ===
On March 29, 1998, a tornado struck St. Peter, killing six-year-old Dustin Schneider, injuring dozens more, and damaging much of the town's housing, commercial, and civic buildings. The tornado destroyed 156 single-family houses and 51 apartment units. An additional 362 houses and apartments suffered serious damage and 1,383 houses or apartments had minor damage. The town's three trailer parks were largely spared with no mobile homes destroyed and just two seriously damaged. Major losses included the Old Central School, St. Peter Arts and Heritage Center, St. Peter's Catholic Church, St. Peter Evangelical Lutheran Church, and Johnson Hall at Gustavus Adolphus College.

=== Churches ===
- Bethany Alliance Church (Christian & Missionary Alliance), established in 1961, present church built in 1965, church renamed Living Truth Fellowship in 2015
- Calvary Baptist Church, established in 1963, present church built in 1977
- Church of St. Peter (Roman Catholic), established in 1856, present church built in 2001
- Church of the Holy Communion (Episcopal), established in 1854, present church built in 1869–1870
- First Lutheran Church (ELCA), established in 1857, present church built in 1965
- Good Samaritan United Methodist Church, established in 2010, no church at present time
- Sunrise Assembly of God, Established in 1934, present church built in 1988
- St. Peter's Evangelical Lutheran Church (WELS), established in 1867, present church built in 1999
- River of Life Lutheran Church (LCMS), established in 2013 by Our Savior's Lutheran Church of Mankato, member of the Lutheran Church–Missouri Synod since 2016
- Trinity Lutheran Church (ELCA), established in 1892, present church built in 1988
- Union Presbyterian Church, established in 1869 as a result of the union of two congregations (the First Free Presbyterian Church of Traverse des Sioux Established in 1853 and the First Presbyterian Church of St. Peter in 1857), present church built in 1871
- Christ Chapel (ELCA), built from 1959 to 1961, inaugurated in 1962 on the campus of Gustavus Adolphus College

== Education ==
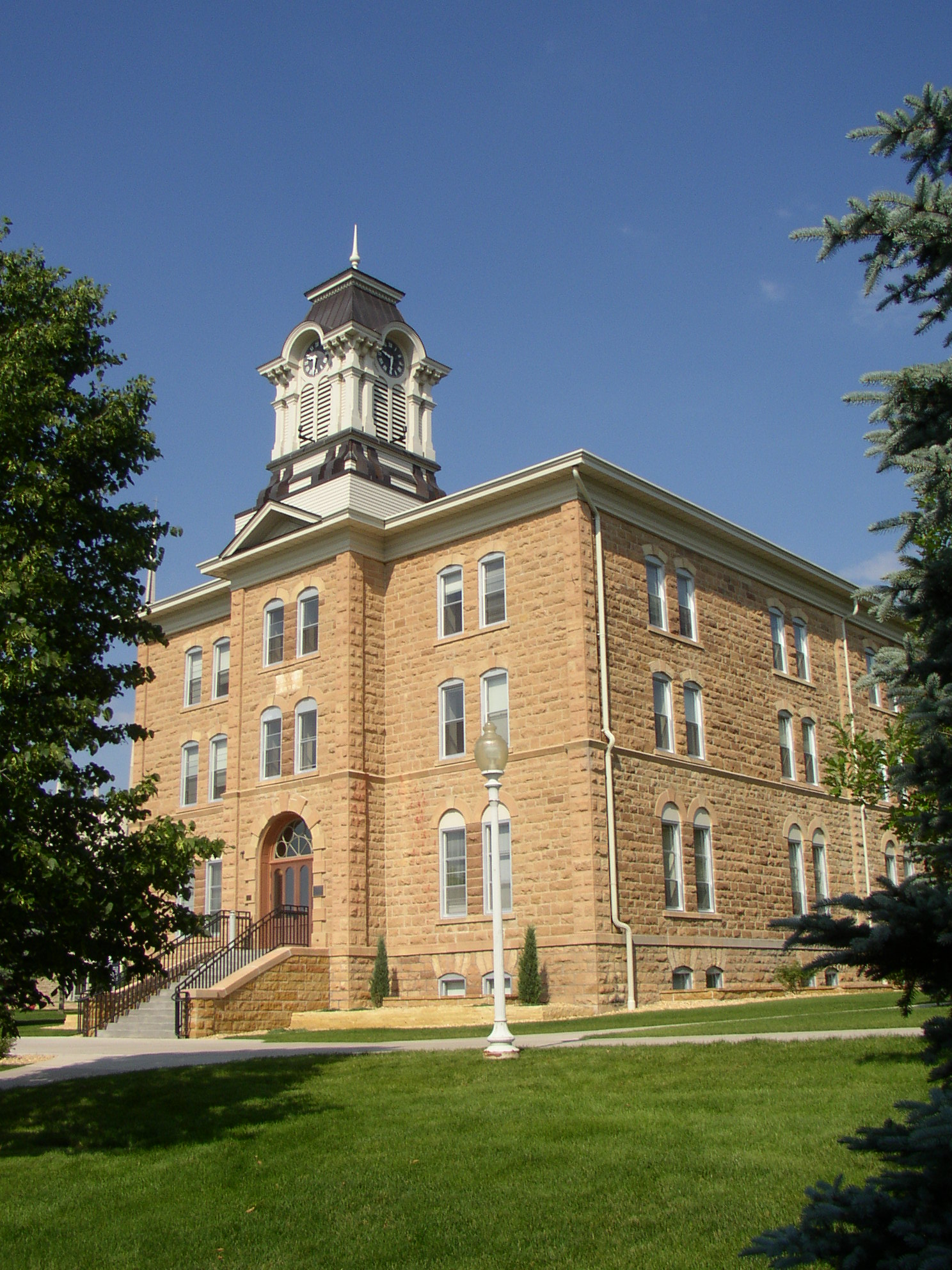
The Old Main building at Gustavus Adolphus College

St. Peter is the home of Gustavus Adolphus College, a private liberal arts college affiliated with the Evangelical Lutheran Church in America (ELCA) and founded in 1862. The public high school is St. Peter High School. There are two parochial schools in St. Peter: John Ireland Catholic School (K-6), which is associated with the Church of St. Peter, and St. Peter Evangelical Lutheran School (K-8), which along with the church is associated with the Wisconsin Evangelical Lutheran Synod. Veritas et Lux Preparatory School is a private non-denominational (K-12) school.

The first class graduated from St. Peter High School in 1880. The first superintendent of St. Peter Public Schools was Andrew Ryan McGill, who served from 1865 to 1868. McGill was Minnesota's 10th governor from 1887 to 1889.

Scholarship America is based in St. Peter.

== Healthcare ==
Community health care is provided by St. Peter Community Hospital. In 2009 St. Peter Community Hospital was renamed River's Edge Hospital. That same year the construction of a new clinic was begun adjoining the hospital. There is now the River's Edge Clinic and the St. Peter Community Clinic, part of the Mayo Health System.

St. Peter is home to the Minnesota Security Hospital, where those the state declares mentally ill and dangerous are committed.

Benedictine Health Care Center, formerly known as St. Peter Community Health Care Center, is part of the River's Edge Hospital complex. Near the hospital Pheasants' Ridge is an assisted living facility that has a section for patients suffering from memory loss due to Alzheimer's disease and dementia. Other health care facilities in St. Peter include Grandview Good Samaritan Center on Sunrise Drive.

River Valley Birth Center opened in St. Peter in the summer of 2014. It is the region's first free-standing birth center.

== Crime ==
St. Peter
- Crime rates* (2023)

Violent crimes
- Homicide: 0
- Rape: 2
- Robbery: 0
- Aggravated assault: 12
- Total violent crime: 14

Property crimes
- Burglary: 7
- Larceny-theft: 69
- Motor vehicle theft: 4
- Arson: 0
- Total property crime: 80
- Note: Reported crimes per 100,000 population Source: FBI Crime Data Explorer 2023

Crime rates in St. Peter by year
Type	2010	2011	2012	2013	2014	2015	2016	2017	2018	2019	2020	2021	2022	2023
Murders	0	0	0	1	1	0	0	0	0	0	0	0	0	0
Rapes	4	5	7	5	3	8	1	7	5	6	7	6	10	2
Robberies	0	2	3	2	0	1	2	2	2	0	1	0	0	0
Assaults	11	7	7	14	6	10	7	6	6	10	6	15	8	12
Burglaries	28	35	28	36	33	26	20	12	15	13	12	14	7	7
Thefts	215	233	225	191	140	143	129	128	135	112	99	115	89	69
Auto Thefts	5	12	2	10	6	6	8	9	7	3	3	6	2	4
Arson	3	0	1	0	0	0	1	0	3	0	2	0	4	0
Crime index	146.1	166.0	168.4	177.0	121.6	143.3	85.0	119.5	106.6	103.3	100.8	114.3	118.6	62.1

== Infrastructure ==
=== Transportation ===
The following routes are within St. Peter:

- U.S. Highway 169
- Minnesota State Highway 22
- Minnesota State Highway 99

== Notable people ==
- Alice A. Andrews — pianist, composer, associated with the Andrews Opera Company
- Horace Austin — sixth governor of Minnesota
- Henry N. Benson — Minnesota Attorney General
- Herbert W. Chilstrom - pastor, and bishop of the Evangelical Lutheran Church of America
- Eugene Saint Julien Cox — mayor of St. Peter, state legislator, district court judge
- Anne Martell Denver — wife of singer John Denver
- Olive Fremstad — opera singer at Metropolitan Opera
- Willis Arnold Gorman — second governor of the Minnesota Territory
- Paul Granlund — American sculptor
- Camilla Hall — Symbionese Liberation Army member
- James M. Hinds — the first congressman assassinated in office
- Gideon S. Ives — lieutenant governor of Minnesota, mayor of St. Peter
- Carl M. Johnson — politician, farmer, and businessman
- John Albert Johnson — 16th governor of Minnesota, presidential candidate, newspaper editor
- Verne C. Johnson — politician and lawyer
- Andrew Ryan McGill — 10th governor of Minnesota, newspaper editor, state senator
- James M. McPherson — Civil War historian and author
- Steve Neils — football player for the St. Louis Cardinals
- Milt Nielsen — baseball player for the Cleveland Indians
- Allen Quist — former state representative and gubernatorial candidate
- Benjamin H. Randall — politician
- Rick Rude — professional wrestler
- Myer Skoog — inventor of the jump shot
- Doug Swenson — politician, lawyer, and judge
- Henry A. Swift — third governor of Minnesota, lieutenant governor of Minnesota, state senator
- John H. Tolan — politician and lawyer
- Thomas Smith Williamson — physician and missionary
- Earl Witte — football player for the Green Bay Packers

== See also ==
- St. Peter Sandstone
- The Arboretum at Gustavus Adolphus College, on the campus of Gustavus Adolphus College
