= Grandin =

Grandin may refer to:

== People ==
- Egbert Bratt Grandin (1806–1845), American publisher
- Elliot Grandin (born 1987), French footballer
- Ethel Grandin (1894–1988), American silent movie actress
- Greg Grandin (born 1962), American historian
- Gunnar Grandin (1918–2004), Swedish Navy rear admiral
- Lilian Mary Grandin (1876–1924) British–Jèrriais physician and medical missionary
- Philomène Grandin (born 1974), Swedish actress and television personality
- Temple Grandin (born 1947), American professor of animal science
- Tom Grandin (1907–1977), American broadcast journalist
- Vital-Justin Grandin (1829–1902), Canadian missionary
- Grandin brothers, late 19th-century American entrepreneurs

== Places ==
- Grandin, Florida, town in Putnam County, Florida, United States
- Grandin, Missouri, city in Carter County, Missouri, United States
- Grandin, New Jersey, an unincorporated community in Hunterdon County, New Jersey, United States
- Grandin, North Dakota, city in Cass County, North Dakota, United States
- Grandin Road Commercial Historic District, an area in Roanoke, Virginia
- Grandin Court, Roanoke, Virginia, a neighborhood in Roanoke, Virginia

== Other uses ==
- Jules de Grandin, a fictional occult detective
- Grandin station, now known as Government Centre station, in Edmonton, Alberta, Canada
