= Oliver Dalrymple =

Oliver Dalrymple (1830–1908) was an American bonanza farmer and land speculator who grew very rich during his time in the 19th century. He was notable for his production of 600,000 bushels of wheat in one year, with one of the largest farms in the United States. Its size has been estimated at 115 square miles, and was opened in 1875. Having died in 1908, his farm was then passed down to his two sons, William Dalrymple and John Stewart Dalrymple.

In 1873, he ran for Governor of Minnesota for the Minnesota Democratic Party. He lost the nomination to Ara Barton.

== See also ==
- Grandin brothers
