= Charles J. Gilman =

American politician (1824–1901)

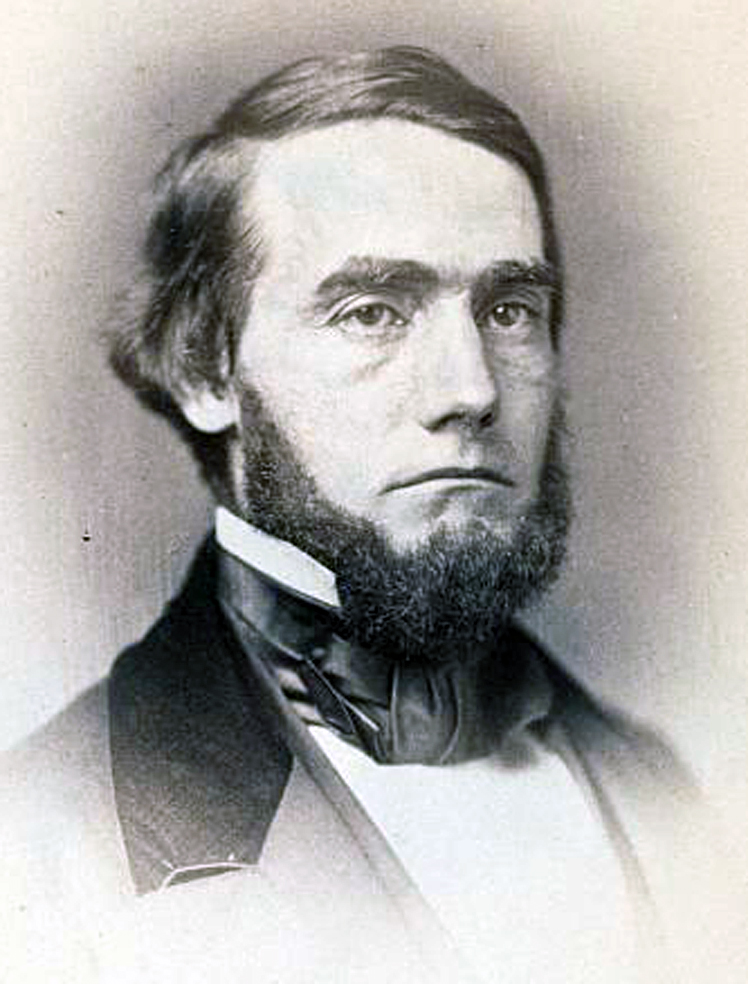

Member of the U.S. House of Representatives from Maine's 2nd district
- In office March 4, 1857 – March 3, 1859
- Preceded by: John J. Perry
- Succeeded by: John J. Perry

Member of the Maine House of Representatives
- In office 1854–1855

Member of the New Hampshire House of Representatives
- In office 1851–1852

Personal details
- Born: Charles Jervis Gilman; February 26, 1824 Exeter, New Hampshire, U.S.
- Died: February 5, 1901 (aged 76) Brunswick, Maine, U.S.
- Resting place: Pine Grove Cemetery
- Party: Republican
- Other political affiliations: Whig
- Spouse: Alice McKeen Dunlap
- Relatives: John Taylor Gilman (granduncle); Nicholas Gilman (granduncle)
- Profession: Politician, lawyer

Charles Jervis Gilman (February 26, 1824 – February 5, 1901) was a U.S. representative from Maine, grandnephew of John Taylor Gilman and Nicholas Gilman.

Born in Exeter, New Hampshire, Gilman attended Phillips Exeter Academy, Exeter, New Hampshire, and pursued classical studies. He was graduated from Harvard Law School. He was admitted to the bar in 1850 and commenced practice in Exeter, New Hampshire. He served as member of the New Hampshire House of Representatives in 1851 and 1852. He moved to Brunswick, Maine and married Alice McKeen Dunlap, and continued the practice of law. He lived in the John Dunlap House, also known as the Gilman Mansion. He served as member of the Maine House of Representatives in 1854 and 1855. He served as member of the State Whig committee.

Gilman was elected as a Republican to the Thirty-fifth Congress (March 4, 1857 – March 3, 1859). He declined to be a candidate for renomination in 1858. He served as delegate to the Republican National Convention in 1860. He was interested in introducing waterworks and other public improvements. He died in Brunswick, Maine, on February 5, 1901. He was interred in Pine Grove Cemetery.

U.S. House of Representatives
Preceded by John J. Perry	Member of the U.S. House of Representatives from Maine's 2nd congressional district March 4, 1857 – March 3, 1859	Succeeded by John J. Perry
