= 1869 Minnesota gubernatorial election =

- November 2, 1869
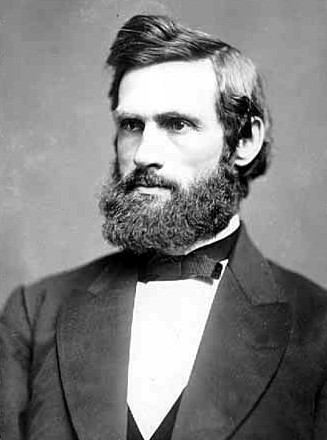

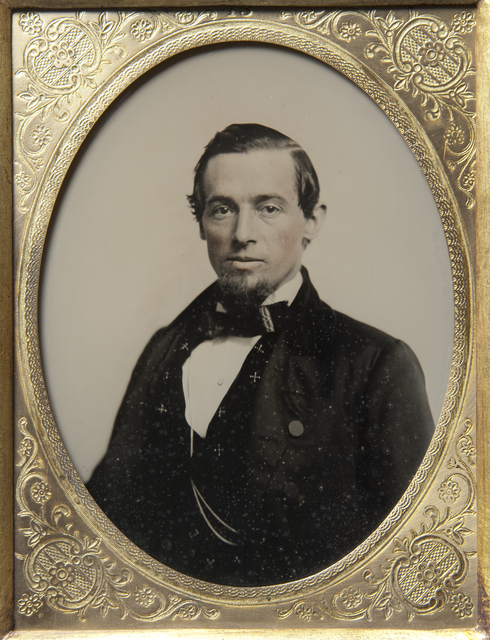
Nominee	Horace Austin	George L. Otis
Party	Republican	Democratic
Popular vote	27,348	25,401
Percentage	50.16%	46.59%
- County results Austin: 40–50% 50–60% 60–70% 70–80% 80–90% 90–100% Otis: 50–60% 60–70% 70–80% 80–90% 90–100% Unknown/no vote
Governor before election
William Rainey Marshall
Republican
Elected Governor
Horace Austin
Republican

The 1869 Minnesota gubernatorial election was held on November 2, 1869, to elect the governor of Minnesota. Incumbent Republican William Rainey Marshall did not seek a second term.

== Candidates ==
- Horace Austin, judge and Dakota War of 1862 veteran (Republican)
- Daniel Cobb, chaplain of Minnesota legislature (Prohibition)
- George L. Otis, former mayor of St. Paul (Democrat)

== Campaigns ==
The main issue of the election was concerns over the potential for corruption within the government. With the Republican Party having held domination of the state government for about a decade, there were worries that the Republicans, if left unchecked, would create a self-serving political system at the detriment of the people. This was a strong campaign point for the Democrats.

The Republicans nominated Judge Horace Austin, due to his disdain for party politics, and impartiality.

The Democrats nominated George L. Otis. Otis, a progressive who was otherwise retired from politics, was surprised at the nomination, but accepted it.

The newly formed Prohibition Party held their convention on October 6, 1869. ran their first candidate, Daniel Cobb. Cobb would become the first person to run for governor of Minnesota who was not a member of the Democratic or Republican parties. In his nomination speech, Cobb admitted he was running not necessarily to win the election, but out of principle. He described his platform as 'Divine'. He believed that the Prohibition Party would have a similar history as the Republican Party had to that point, being that it was a small, fringe movement that quickly rose to become of immense historical importance.

It was thought by some Republicans that the Prohibition Party was merely a tactic launched by the Democrats to split the Republican vote, and allow then to win. Ironically, the Prohibition Party saw more support from Democrats than Republicans in the state.

== Results ==
Minnesota gubernatorial election, 1869
Party	Candidate	Votes	%
Republican	Horace Austin	27,348	50.16
Democratic	George L. Otis	25,401	46.59
Prohibition	Daniel Cobb	1,764	3.24
	Write-Ins	12	3.24
Total votes		54,525	0.02
Republican hold			
