= Daniel Cobb =

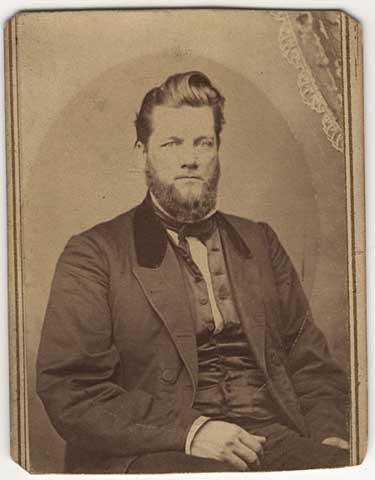
- Cobb in 1866
- Born: November 7, 1818; Marcellus, New York
- Died: December 25, 1894 (aged 76); Los Angeles, California
- Spouse(s): Louise M. Sherman (m. 1858), Mary Earl (m. ~1845-1857)(Died)

Daniel Cobb (November 7, 1818 – December 25, 1894) was an American Champlain and Prohibitionist.

Cobb was born in Marcellus, New York in 1818. He moved to Rochester, Minnesota by 1858. He was a Methodist minister. He served in the 6th Minnesota Infantry Regiment as the Regimental Champlain during the American Civil War. Upon the end of the war, he would become the official Champlain of the Minnesota House of Representatives, in 1866.

In 1869, he would be the first candidate in Minnesota to run for governor for the Prohibition Party. In his nomination speech, Cobb admitted he was running not necessarily to win the election, but out of principal. Cobb described his platform as 'Divine'. Cobb believed that the Prohibition Party would have a similar history as the Republican Party had to that point, being that it was a small, fringe movement that quickly rose to become of immense historical importance. He would lost with only 3.24% of the vote.

He would die in Los Angeles, California, in 1894 at the age of 76. He is buried in Evergreen Cemetery.
