= John Dunlap House =

Historic house in Maine, United States

- U.S. National Register of Historic Places
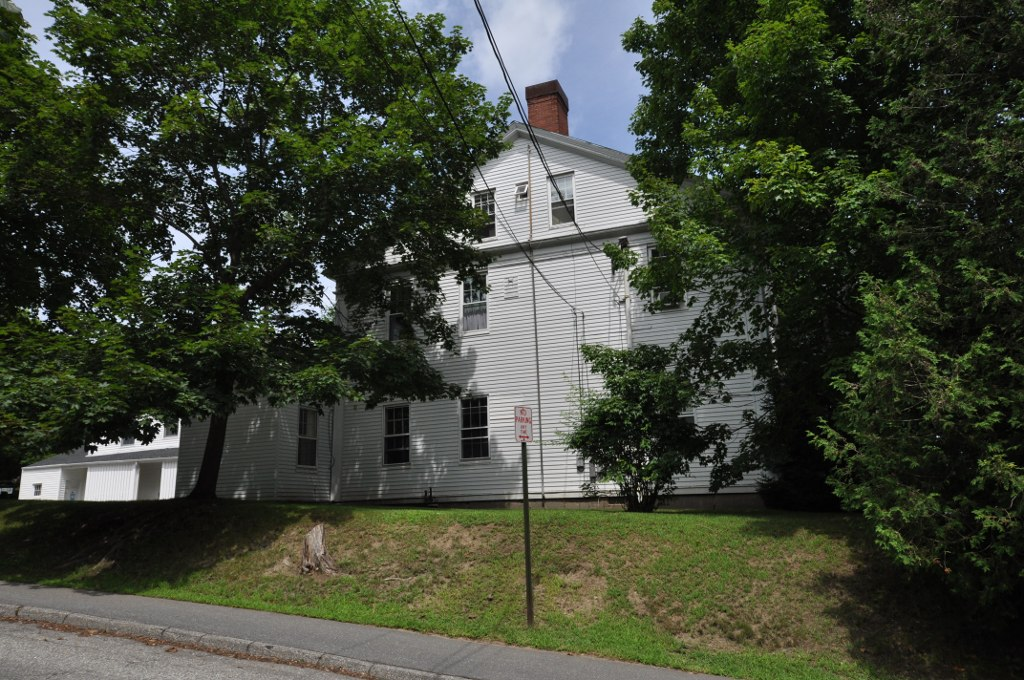

- Location within Maine Location within the United States
- Location: 4 Oak Street, Brunswick, Maine
- Coordinates: 43°55′02″N 69°58′08″W
- Built: 1799
- Architect: Samuel Melcher III, Aaron Melcher
- Architectural style: Federal, Greek Revival
- NRHP reference No.: 79000138
- Added to NRHP: June 14, 1979

The John Dunlap House, also known as Gilman Mansion, is an historic house located at 4 Oak Street in Brunswick, Maine, United States. Built in 1799, it was probably one of Brunswick's grandest houses of the time, built for John Dunlap, a prominent local businessman. It was listed on the National Register of Historic Places in 1979.

== Description and history ==
The Dunlap House is located in a residential area west of Brunswick's downtown, on the north side of Oak Street west of Union Street. It is set on a slight rise that would have had a fine view of the Androscoggin River to the north, from which it is now separated by United States Route 1. It is a 2 1/2-story wood-frame structure, five bays wide, with a side-gable roof, two interior chimneys, clapboard siding, and a granite foundation. The front facade, which faces east, has a Greek Revival portico sheltering the centered entrance, with fluted Ionic columns supporting an entablature and cornice. The entry is flanked by sidelights and topped by a transom window. Two single-story additions extend the building to the west, parallel to the street. It had 50 rooms, views of the river, and gardens that were unmatched in the town. It had a 50-foot drawing room and a three-story mahogany staircase.

The house was built in 1799 and designed by the Melcher Brothers, Samuel III and Aaron. It was considered the finest home in Brunswick upon completion, built for Brunswick's wealthiest resident, John Dunlap. Dunlap was the son of the first minister in the town. He gained massive wealth through the fur trade as well as in Brunswick's burgeoning lumber industry. Congressman Charles J. Gilman married a descendant of John Dunlap, Alice McKeen Dunlap, and lived in the mansion. The property stayed in the family until 1929, and was later subdivided into apartments.

== See also ==
- National Register of Historic Places listings in Cumberland County, Maine
