= John J. Perry =

American politician (1811–1897)

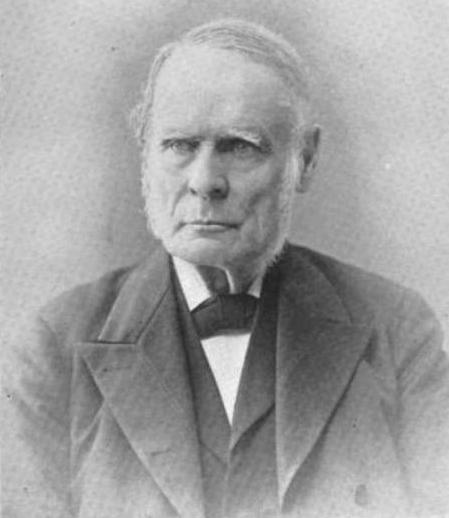

Member of the U.S. House of Representatives from Maine's 2nd district
- In office March 4, 1859 – March 3, 1861
- Preceded by: Charles J. Gilman
- Succeeded by: Charles W. Walton
- In office March 4, 1855 – March 3, 1857
- Preceded by: Samuel Mayall
- Succeeded by: Charles J. Gilman

Member of the Maine Senate
- In office 1846–1847

Member of the Maine House of Representatives
- In office 1840, 1842, 1843, 1872

Personal details
- Born: John Jasiel Perry; August 2, 1811 Portsmouth, New Hampshire, U.S.
- Died: May 2, 1897 (aged 85) Portland, Maine, U.S.
- Resting place: Evergreen Cemetery
- Party: Republican
- Occupation: Politician, lawyer

John Jasiel Perry (August 2, 1811 – May 2, 1897) was a U.S. Representative from Maine.

Born in Portsmouth, New Hampshire, Perry moved with his parents to Hebron (now Oxford), Maine, in 1812. He attended the common schools and Maine Wesleyan Seminary. During one of his school terms in Hebron his teacher was future President Franklin Pierce. He became deputy sheriff of Oxford County and served as member of the Maine House of Representatives in 1840, 1842, 1843, and 1872. He studied law and was admitted to the bar in 1844, commencing practice in Oxford. He served as member of the Maine State Senate in 1846 and 1847 and as clerk of the Maine House of Representatives in 1854.

Perry was elected as a Republican candidate to the 34th Congress (March 4, 1855 – March 3, 1857). He was not a candidate for renomination in 1856. He was then elected as a Republican to the 36th Congress (March 4, 1859 – March 3, 1861). He was not a candidate for renomination in 1860. He served as member of the Peace Conference of 1861, which was held in an effort to prevent the start of the American Civil War.

He was editor of the Oxford Democrat from 1860 to 1875 and extensively connected with newspapers, both in and out of the state, as correspondent. He served as member of the state executive council in 1866 and 1867. He moved to Portland, Maine, in 1875 and engaged in the practice of his profession until his death in that city on May 2, 1897. He was interred in Evergreen Cemetery.

U.S. House of Representatives
Preceded by Samuel Mayall	Member of the U.S. House of Representatives from Maine's 2nd congressional district March 4, 1855 – March 3, 1857	Succeeded by Charles J. Gilman
Preceded by Charles J. Gilman	Member of the U.S. House of Representatives from Maine's 2nd congressional district March 4, 1859 – March 3, 1861	Succeeded by Charles W. Walton
