= Ara Barton =

American politician

Member of the Minnesota House of Representatives from the 18th district
- In office January 2, 1872 – January 6, 1873

Member of the Minnesota House of Representatives from the 8th district
- In office January 3, 1871 – January 2, 1872

Member of the Minnesota House of Representatives from the 3rd district
- In office December 7, 1859 – December 29, 1859

Personal details
- Born: April 12, 1824 Charlestown, New Hampshire, United States
- Died: November 6, 1898 (aged 74) Morristown, Minnesota, United States
- Party: Democratic
- Other political affiliations: Greenback (1879)
- Spouse: Louisa J. Fish
- Children: 4

Military service
- Allegiance: United States of America
- Branch/service: Union Army
- Years of service: August 1862 - June 1866
- Rank: Captain
- Unit: 1st Minnesota Cavalry Regiment; Brackett's Minnesota Cavalry Battalion
- Commands: First Lieutenant of Company F, 1st Minnesota Cavalry Regiment.; Captain of Company D, Brackett's Minnesota Cavalry Battalion
- Battles/wars: Dakota War of 1862; Battle of Big Mound; Battle of Dead Buffalo Lake; Battle of Stony Lake; Battle of Killdeer Mountain; Battle of the Badlands

Ara Barton, sometimes listed as Asa Barton (April 12, 1824 – November 6, 1898) was an American politician, lawyer, and military officer from the state of Minnesota.

== Biography ==
Ara Barton was born in Charlestown, New Hampshire in 1824, a small town near the border with Vermont. His father was Frye Barton (1790–1871) and his mother was Judith Powers (1790–1888).

Barton moved to Minnesota Territory in 1857 and was elected to the Minnesota House of Representatives in 1859, however the elections in District 3 were contested due to charges of illegal votes, and their opponents were sworn in. On November 1, 1862 following the end of the Dakota War of 1862, Barton enlisted as a Private into Company F of the 1st Minnesota Cavalry Regiment which fought at the Battle of Big Mound, the Battle of Dead Buffalo Lake, and the Battle of Stony Lake. During his time with the regiment Barton quickly rose to the rank of Commissary Sergeant. Later on in June 1863 Barton was commissioned as the First lieutenant of Company F, he mustered out on December 2, 1863. Following his service with the 1st Minnesota Cavalry Regiment Barton reenlisted into Brackett's Minnesota Cavalry Battalion on December 4, 1863. Due to his previous service in the 1st Minnesota Cavalry, Barton was promoted to the rank of Captain and given command of Company D in Brackett's Battalion. Barton mustered out with his company along with the rest of the battalion from May - June, 1866.

Following his service in the Union army Barton was admitted to the Minnesota bar examination and became a lawyer opening his own a law office in Northfield, Minnesota with A. O. Whipple. Barton was later elected to the House in 1870. Barton ran for Governor of Minnesota in the 1873 election, losing to Republican Cushman Kellogg Davis and finishing with about 48% of the vote.

In 1876, Barton was sheriff of Rice County, Minnesota, during the failed attempt of the James–Younger Gang to rob a bank in Northfield. On July 19, 1879, he was nominated by the Greenback Party as their candidate for Governor, but declined the nomination five days later. However, in 1889, Barton wrote to Governor William R. Merriam in an attempt to pardon the Younger brothers.

He died in Morristown, Minnesota on November 6, 1898, at the age of 74.

== Personal life ==
Barton married Louisa J. Fish (1823–1890). They had four children: Marcus Dehart Barton, Inez Barton, Phineas W. Barton, and Ara P. Barton.

Party political offices
Preceded by Winthrop Young	Democratic nominee for Governor of Minnesota; 1873	Succeeded by David L. Buell
