= Samuel Mayall =

American politician (1816–1892)

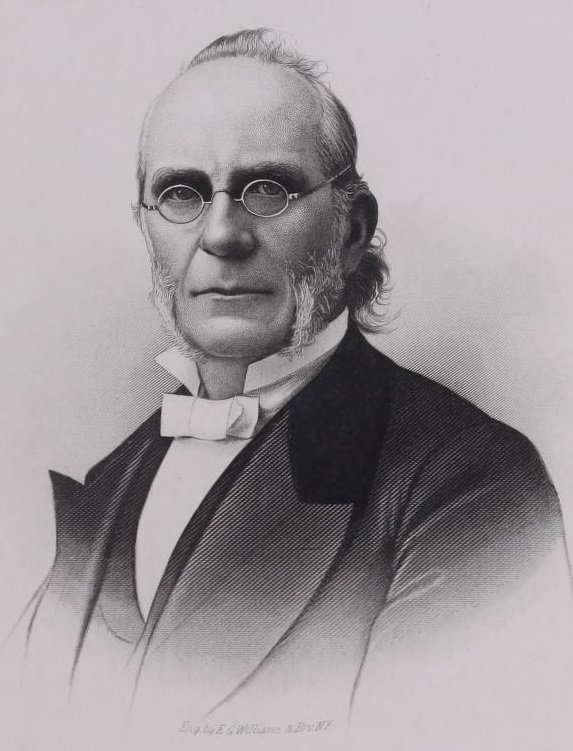
- From 1890's History of St. Paul, Minn.

Member of the U.S. House of Representatives from Maine's 2nd district
- In office March 4, 1853 – March 3, 1855
- Preceded by: John Appleton
- Succeeded by: John J. Perry

Personal details
- Born: June 21, 1816 Gray, Massachusetts
- Died: September 17, 1892 (aged 76) St. Paul
- Resting place: Oakland Cemetery, Saint Paul, Minnesota
- Party: Democratic
- Other political affiliations: Republican, Prohibition Party

Samuel Mayall (June 21, 1816 – September 17, 1892) was a United States representative from Maine. He was born in North Gray, Massachusetts (now in Maine). He attended public schools and was tutored privately at home. He moved to Gray, Maine and served in both house of the Maine legislature. A Democrat, he became a Republican im the 1850s and moved to Minnesota. He served as an officer in the Civil War.

Mayall was a member of the Maine House of Representatives in 1845, 1847, and 1848. He served in the Maine Senate in 1847 and 1848 but declined the Democratic nomination as a candidate for Representative to the Thirty-second Congress. He was elected as a Democrat to the Thirty-third Congress (March 4, 1853 – March 3, 1855) but was not a candidate for renomination in 1854. After leaving Congress, he was a delegate to the Republican National Convention in 1856.

Mayall moved to St. Paul, Minnesota, in 1857. He became a large landowner before he was commissioned as a captain at the beginning of the American Civil War. After the war, he devoted his time to looking after his large business interests. He ran for governor of Minnesota twice, in 1871 and 1873, both times for the Prohibition Party. He died in St. Paul in 1892 and was buried in Oakland Cemetery.

U.S. House of Representatives
Preceded by John Appleton	Member of the U.S. House of Representatives from Maine's 2nd congressional district March 4, 1853 – March 3, 1855	Succeeded by John J. Perry
