= William W. McNair =

American politician (1836–1885)

William Woodbridge McNair
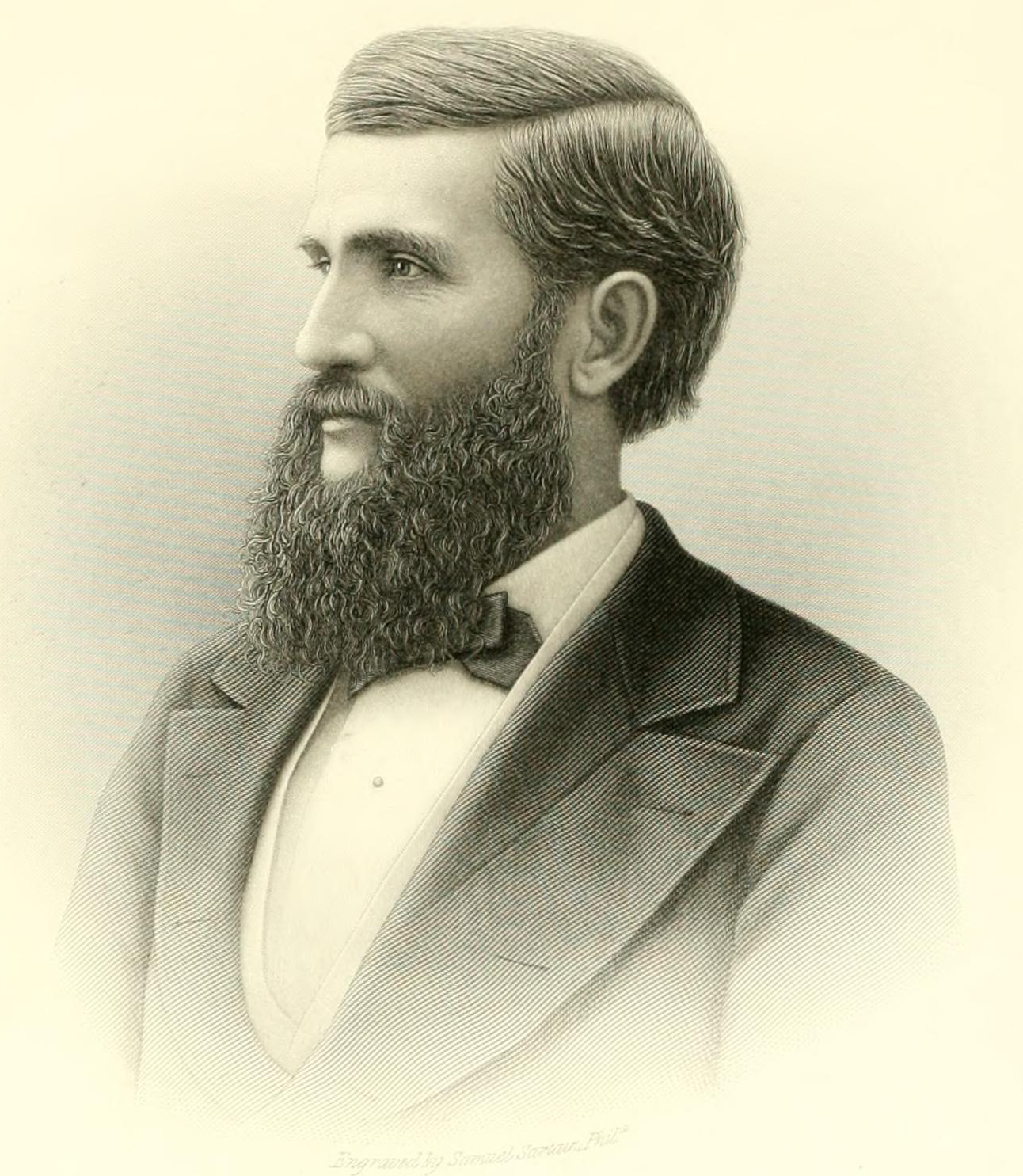

Mayor of St. Anthony, Minnesota
- Preceded by: Winthrop Young
- Succeeded by: Edwin S. Brown

Personal details
- Born: January 4, 1836 Groveland, New York, U.S.
- Died: September 15, 1885 (aged 49) Minneapolis, Minnesota, U.S.
- Resting place: Lakewood Cemetery
- Occupation: Lawyer

William Woodbridge McNair (January 4, 1836 – September 15, 1885) was a lawyer and Democratic politician who served as mayor of St. Anthony, Minnesota.

== Life and career ==
McNair was born in Groveland, New York to William Wilson McNair and Sarah McNair (née Pierepont, a descendant of James Pierpont). He attended schools in Genesee, New York and at Canandaigua Academy before moving to Racine, Wisconsin in 1855 to study law under James Rood Doolittle. After two years he moved to Minneapolis where he continued his studies and gained admission to the bar in 1857.

From 1859 to 1863 McNair served as county attorney for Hennepin County, Minnesota. Thereafter McNair formed several successive legal partnerships with local legal and political figures including Eugene McLanahan Wilson, William Lochren and John Gilfillan. McNair was especially well regarded as a defense attorney (though he practiced in a variety of areas). He also held a number of political offices including two terms as mayor of St. Anthony (shortly prior to its absorption into Minneapolis) from 1869 to 1871. In 1876 he was the Democratic nominee for United States Representative but lost to Jacob H. Stewart. In 1879, he was the runner-up for governor, losing the Democratic primary by ten votes to Edmund Rice. Instead of moving to a second ballot, McNair and other opposition candidates withdrew. In 1883 he declined the nomination to run for governor.

McNair retired in 1884 and died in 1885. He is buried in Lakewood Cemetery in Minneapolis.
