= 1873 Minnesota gubernatorial election =

- November 4, 1873
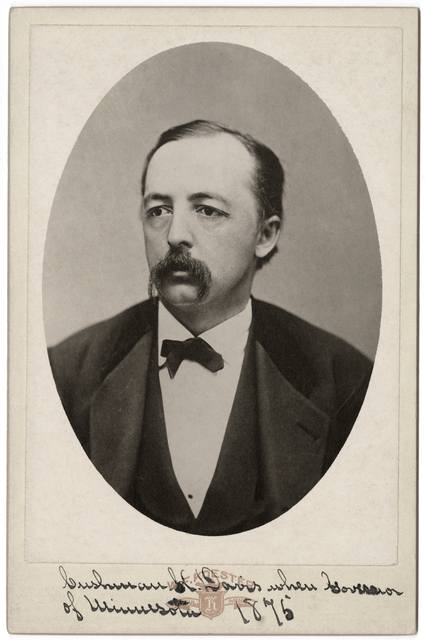

Nominee	Cushman Kellogg Davis	Ara Barton
Party	Republican	Democratic
Popular vote	40,741	35,245
Percentage	52.90%	45.76%
- County results Davis: 50–60% 60–70% 70–80% 80–90% 90–100% Barton: 50–60% 60–70% 70–80% Unknown/no vote
Governor before election
Horace Austin
Republican
Elected Governor
C. K. Davis
Republican

The 1873 Minnesota gubernatorial election was held on November 4, 1873, to elect the governor of Minnesota. Incumbent Republican Horace Austin did not seek a third term.

== Candidates ==
- Ara Barton, member of the Minnesota House of Representatives (Democrat)
- Cushman Kellogg Davis, United States district attorney (Republican)
- Samuel Mayall, former member of the House of Representatives (Prohibition)

== Campaigns ==
The Democratic Convention was held on September 2, 1873. It was nicknamed the 'Owatonna Potato Bug Convention'. This was in reference to the sentiment that, like potato bugs would eat crops, the Democratic Party was bad for farmers. The Democrats had multiple candidates in their primary, being David L. Buell, Ara Barton, R.A. Simmons, and Oliver Dalrymple. Barton was nominated on the first ballot.

The Prohibition Convention was also held on September 2, 1873. Samuel Mayall was suspected of being nominated, but seen as unlikely to accept. He would ultimately accept the nomination.

The Republican Convention was held on September 16, 1873. The ensuing Republican Primary was a contentious race between William D. Washburn, Incumbent Horace Austin, Thomas H. Armstrong, and Cushman Kellogg Davis. After the second ballot, Armstrong withdrew from the race. Austin did the same after the third. The final vote between Davis and Washburn came to 152 for Washburn and 155 for Davis. Davis was declared the winner.

Barton's campaign was hurt by the Democratic nominee for Lieutenant Governor of Minnesota, Ebenezer Ayres. It was thought that Barton would seek a seat in the United States Senate following his election, leaving the unpopular Ayres as governor. However, Barton fared well in the public image on his own, being called a 'Regular Old-Time Democrat', in contrast to the previous previous four Democratic gubernatorial nominees, all of whom were either an ideological outlier or dealt with scandals.

== Results ==
Minnesota gubernatorial election, 1873
Party	Candidate	Votes	%
Republican	Cushman Kellogg Davis	40,741	52.90
Democratic	Ara Barton	35,245	47.56
Prohibition	Samuel Mayall	1,036	1.35
Total votes		77,022	100.00
Republican hold			
