= George L. Otis =

American politician

George Lorenzo Otis
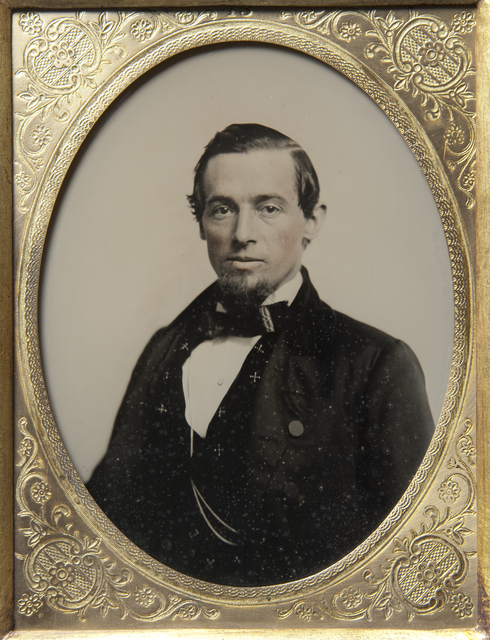
- Otis in 1858

14th Mayor of Saint Paul, Minnesota
- In office 1867–1868
- Preceded by: John S. Prince
- Succeeded by: Jacob H. Stewart

Member of the Minnesota Senate from the 21st district
- In office 1866
- Preceded by: John Nicols
- Succeeded by: Chauncey W. Griggs

Member of the Minnesota House of Representatives from the 2nd district
- In office 1857–1858

Personal details
- Born: October 7, 1829 Homer, New York, U.S.
- Died: March 29, 1883 (aged 53) Saint Paul, Minnesota, U.S.
- Resting place: Oakland Cemetery
- Party: Democratic
- Spouse: Mary Virginia Morrison (m. 1858)

George Lorenzo Otis (October 7, 1829 – March 29, 1882) was a lawyer and politician in the U.S. state of Minnesota.

Otis was born in Homer, New York, to Isaac Otis (1798–1853) and Caroline Abigail Curtiss (1808-1883) in 1829. He married Mary Virginia Morrison in 1858.

He entered politics as a Democrat in 1856, running for the Minnesota House of Representatives's 2nd district. He would win, and serve a single term there. He would leave politics for a number of years, until returning in 1865, when he was elected to the Minnesota Senate. He then served as the 14th mayor of Saint Paul, Minnesota from 1867-1868.

In 1869, Otis was nominated for Governor of Minnesota in 1869 by the Democratic State Convention. In his acceptance letter to Convention President James Castle he expressed his surprise at the nomination. He accepted the nomination, hoping to break the ten-year domination of the Republican Party over Minnesotan politics, believing they would, if left unchecked, grow into a corrupt oligarchy. He declared he would not run as a conservative, stating "...the dead issues of the past (may) be consigned to oblivion; let us keep in view the living wants of the present and the progressive events of this age". He would lose to Republican Horace Austin, receiving 46.6% of the vote.

Otis would fully retire from politics after his loss. He died in St. Paul on March 29, 1883, at age 53.

Party political offices
Preceded by Charles Eugene Flandrau	Democratic nominee for Governor of Minnesota; 1869	Succeeded by Winthrop Young
