= Horatio N. Davis =

19th century American politician

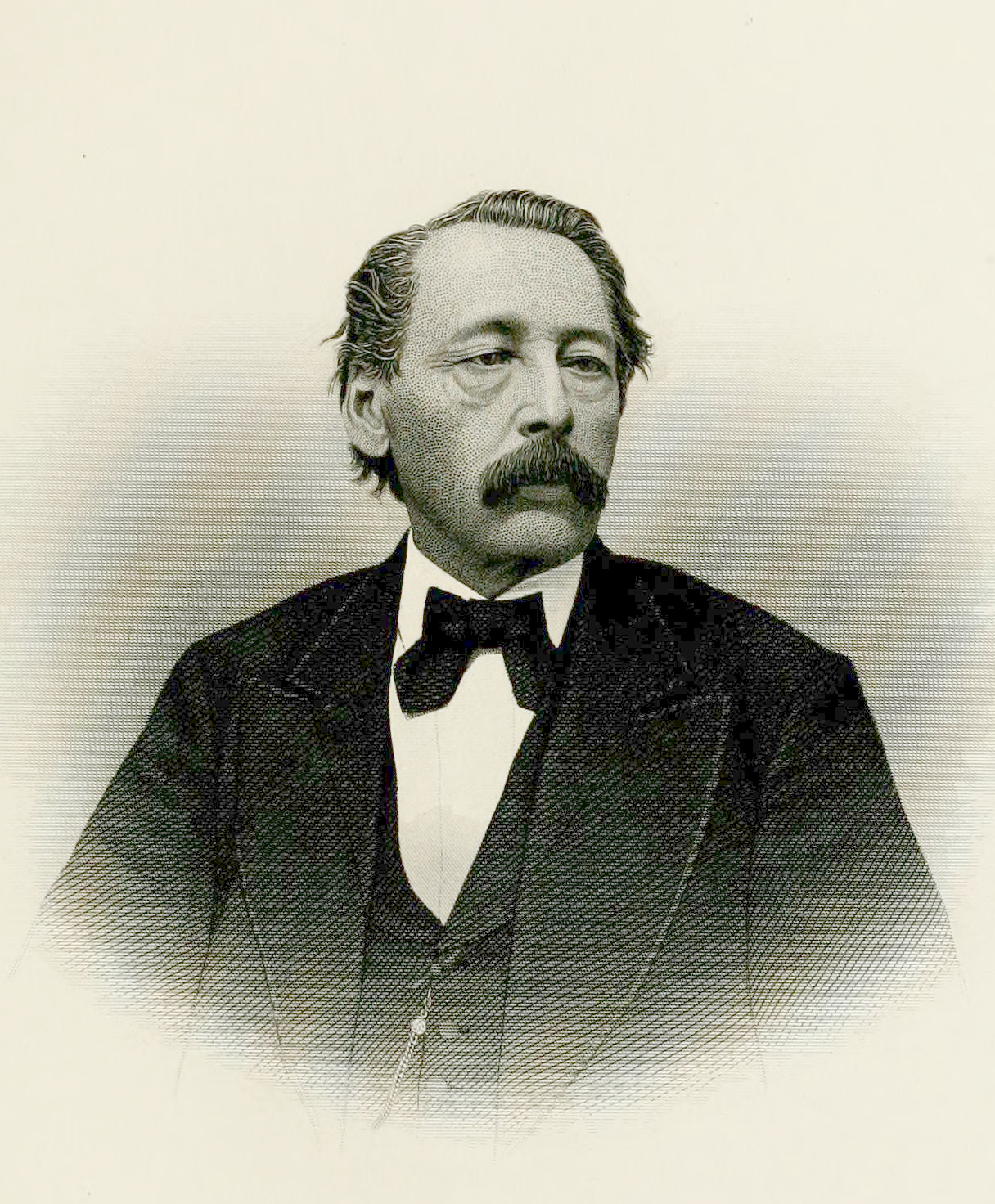
- Portrait from the United States biographical dictionary and portrait gallery of eminent and self-made men; Wisconsin volume (1877)

13th & 15th Mayor of Beloit, Wisconsin
- In office April 1875 – April 1876
- Preceded by: David S. Foster
- Succeeded by: Charles F. G. Collins
- In office April 1872 – April 1874
- Preceded by: David S. Foster
- Succeeded by: David S. Foster

Member of the Wisconsin Senate from the 17th district
- In office January 1873 – January 1877
- Preceded by: Charles G. Williams
- Succeeded by: Hamilton Richardson

Personal details
- Born: June 17, 1812 Henderson, New York, U.S.
- Died: February 15, 1907 (aged 94) Buffalo, New York, U.S.
- Resting place: Prairie Home Cemetery, Waukesha, Wisconsin
- Party: Republican
- Spouse: Clarissa F. Cushman (died 1903)
- Children: Cushman Kellogg Davis^{(b. 1838; died 1900)}; Janet (Tripp)^{(b. 1846; died 1934)}

Military service
- Allegiance: United States
- Branch/service: United States Volunteers; Union Army
- Years of service: 1863–1866
- Rank: Captain (Commissary); Brevet Major, USV
- Battles/wars: American Civil War

Horatio Nelson Davis (June 17, 1812 – February 15, 1907) was an American banker, Republican politician, and Wisconsin pioneer. He was the 13th and 15th mayor of Beloit, Wisconsin, and represented Rock County in the Wisconsin State Senate for four years. He was the father of Cushman Kellogg Davis, who served as a U.S. senator and Governor of Minnesota.

== Biography ==
Davis was born in Henderson, New York. During the American Civil War, he was commissioned a captain in the Union Army for the commissary and subsistence department. At the end of the war, he received an honorary brevet to major. Afterwards, he became a bank president. His son, Cushman Kellogg Davis, became a member of the United States Senate and Governor of Minnesota.

== Political career ==
Davis represented the 17th District in the Senate during the 1873, 1874, 1875 and 1876 sessions. Other positions he held include Mayor of Beloit, Wisconsin from 1873 to 1877. He was a Republican.

Davis was alive to celebrate his 50th wedding anniversary in 1887, and to receive his son on the family farm in 1890. Davis died in Buffalo, New York at the age of 94, having "retained his mental and physical faculties almost to the end".
