= Winthrop Young =

American politician from Minnesota

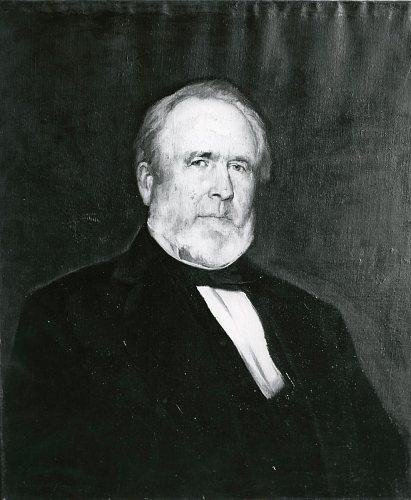
- Young in 1885

11th Mayor of St. Anthony, Minnesota
- In office April 7, 1868 – April 10, 1869
- Preceded by: Orlando C. Merriman
- Succeeded by: William W. McNair

Personal details
- Born: September 18, 1817 Waterford, Vermont
- Died: July 10, 1896 (aged 78) St. Anthony, Minnesota
- Resting place: Lakewood Cemetery
- Party: Democratic
- Spouse: Mary Catherine Johnson
- Children: 3

Winthrop Young (September 18, 1817 – July 10, 1896) was a politician from the U.S. State of Minnesota.

Young was born in Waterford, Vermont in 1817. In 1861, he moved to St. Anthony, Minnesota.

In 1864, he attended the Democratic State Convention of Minnesota. In 1868, he was the mayor of St. Anthony. In 1871 he was the Democratic nominee for Governor of Minnesota. During the campaign, he often resorted to personal attacks and insults against his opponent, Horace Austin. In late October 1871, he alleged that Austin had accepted a bribe of "several thousand dollars" to pass a bill.

== Land-Grabber Scandal ==
On November 1, 1871, just one week before the 1871 Minnesota gubernatorial election, the St. Paul Daily News published a letter that alleged a conspiracy involving Young. The conspiracy (which had been talked of in previous weeks before any proof was found) alleged that a Young had secretly worked with multiple Republican to undermine Republican support Austin. Governor Austin had vetoed a Land-division bill, preventing so-called 'Land Dividers' or 'Land Grabbers' from being able to buy up a total of 500,000 acres of land. These 'Land-Grabbers' would then bring the bill again to the governor's desk once Winthrop would be elected, and it would be passed, to their benefit. The St. Paul Daily News raised no dispute to with it, however claimed that Young himself was not involved in the planning of the conspiracy.

His campaign against Austin began to collapse, and he and his supporters continued the campaign against Austin, largely using personal insults and attacks. He denied all and any involvement in the conspiracy, or even that such an conspiracy existed. Young would state he was not in support of the Land Division bill. Despite this, in his acceptance speech at the Democratic State Convention he spoke of supporting it.

He would lose the election to Austin on November 7, 1871, gaining only 38.86% of the vote.

== Later life ==
He was a member of the St. Anthony school board from 1878 to 1880.

He died on July 10, 1896, in St. Anthony and was buried at Lakewood Cemetery.

Party political offices
Preceded by George L. Otis	Democratic nominee for Governor of Minnesota; 1871	Succeeded by Ara Barton
