= 1871 Minnesota gubernatorial election =

- November 7, 1871
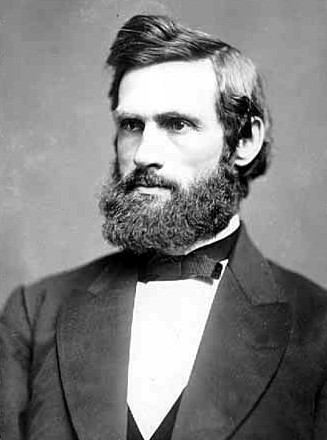

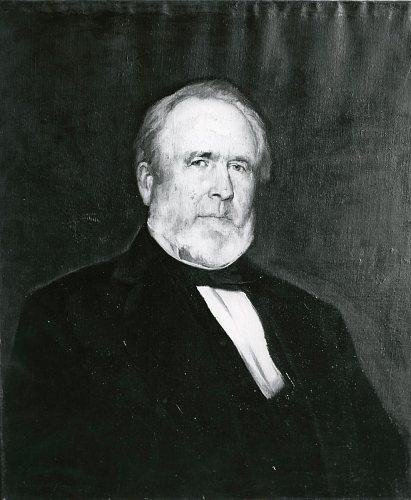
Nominee	Horace Austin	Winthrop Young
Party	Republican	Democratic
Popular vote	46,950	30,376
Percentage	60.06%	38.86%
- County results Austin: 50–60% 60–70% 70–80% 80–90% 90–100% Young: 50–60% 60–70% 70–80% No data/vote
Governor before election
Horace Austin
Republican
Elected Governor
Horace Austin
Republican

The 1871 Minnesota gubernatorial election was held on November 7, 1871, to elect the governor of Minnesota. Incumbent Horace Austin was reelected to a second term.

== Candidates ==
- Horace Austin, incumbent (Republican)
- Samuel Mayall, former member of the House of Representatives (Prohibition)
- Winthrop Young, former mayor of St. Anthony (Democrat)

== Campaigns ==
Incumbent Horace Austin ran a campaign focused on controlling the railroad barons, promising to "Shake the railroads over hell".

Democratic nominee Winthrop Young largely resorted to accusations of corruption against Austin, such as claiming Austin had taken bribes of "several thousand dollars". Young's campaign collapsed in the final week of the campaign, as a "land-grabber" scandal broke. The scandal claimed he was collaborating in secret with Anti-Austin Republicans to sabotage Austin's campaign. The goal was to reverse Austin's veto of the Land Division bill, which would have allowed the conspirators to buy 500,000 acres of land from the state.

Young denied any involvement in the conspiracy, or even that such an conspiracy existed. He stated he was not in support of the Land Division bill. Despite this, in his acceptance speech at the Democratic State Convention, he spoke of supporting it. By election day, Young's campaign consisted largely of personal insults and attacks against Austin.

== Results ==
Minnesota gubernatorial election, 1871
Party	Candidate	Votes	%
Republican	Horace Austin (incumbent)	46,950	60.06
Democratic	Winthrop Young	30,376	38.86
Prohibition	Samuel Mayall	846	1.08
Total votes		78,172	100
Republican hold			
