= Grandin brothers =

American entrepreneurs who were among the first in commercial oil prospecting in the US

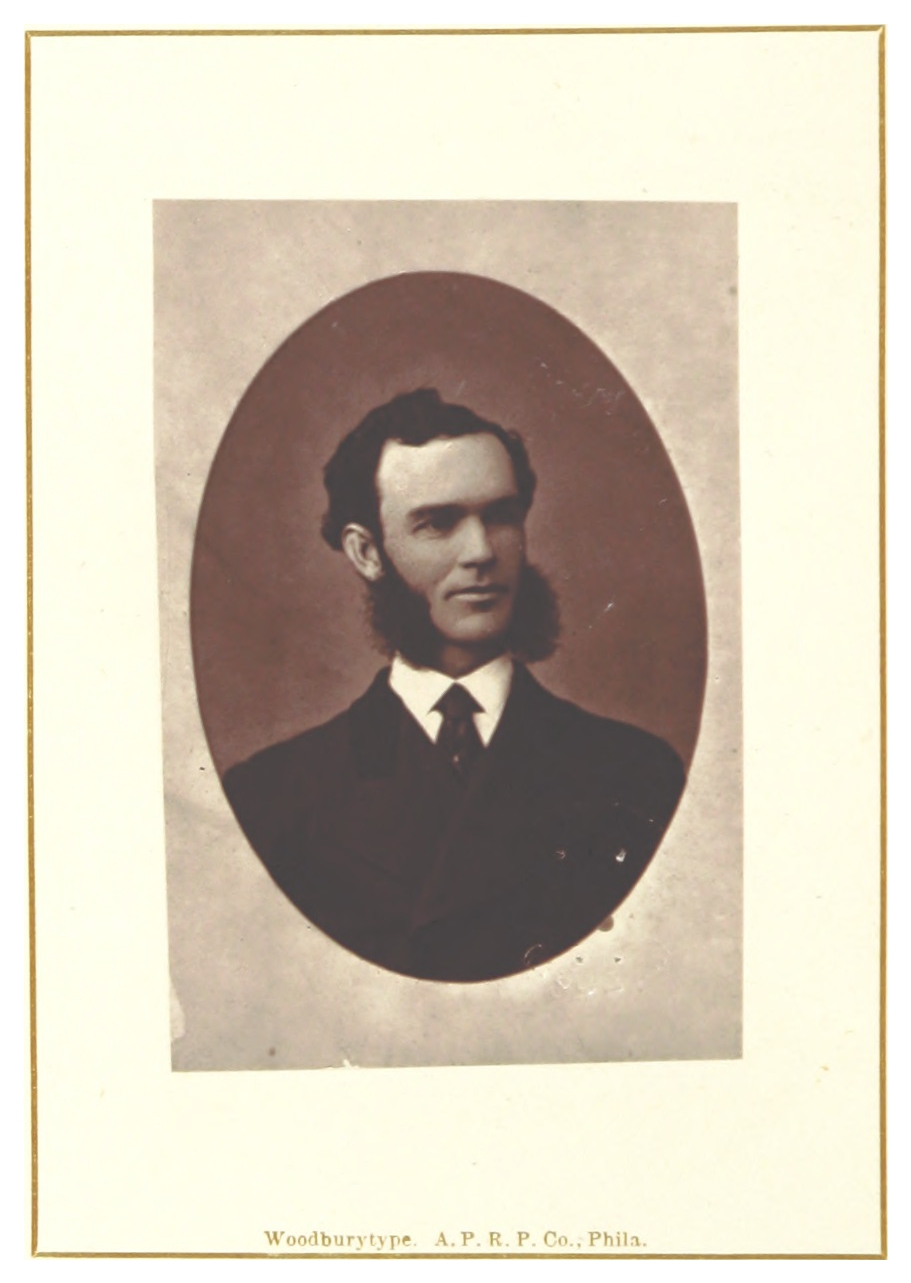
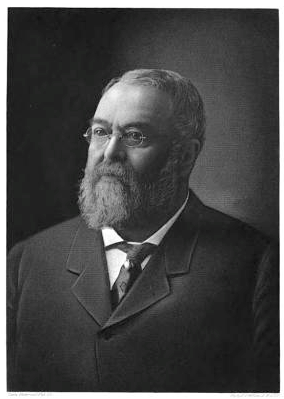
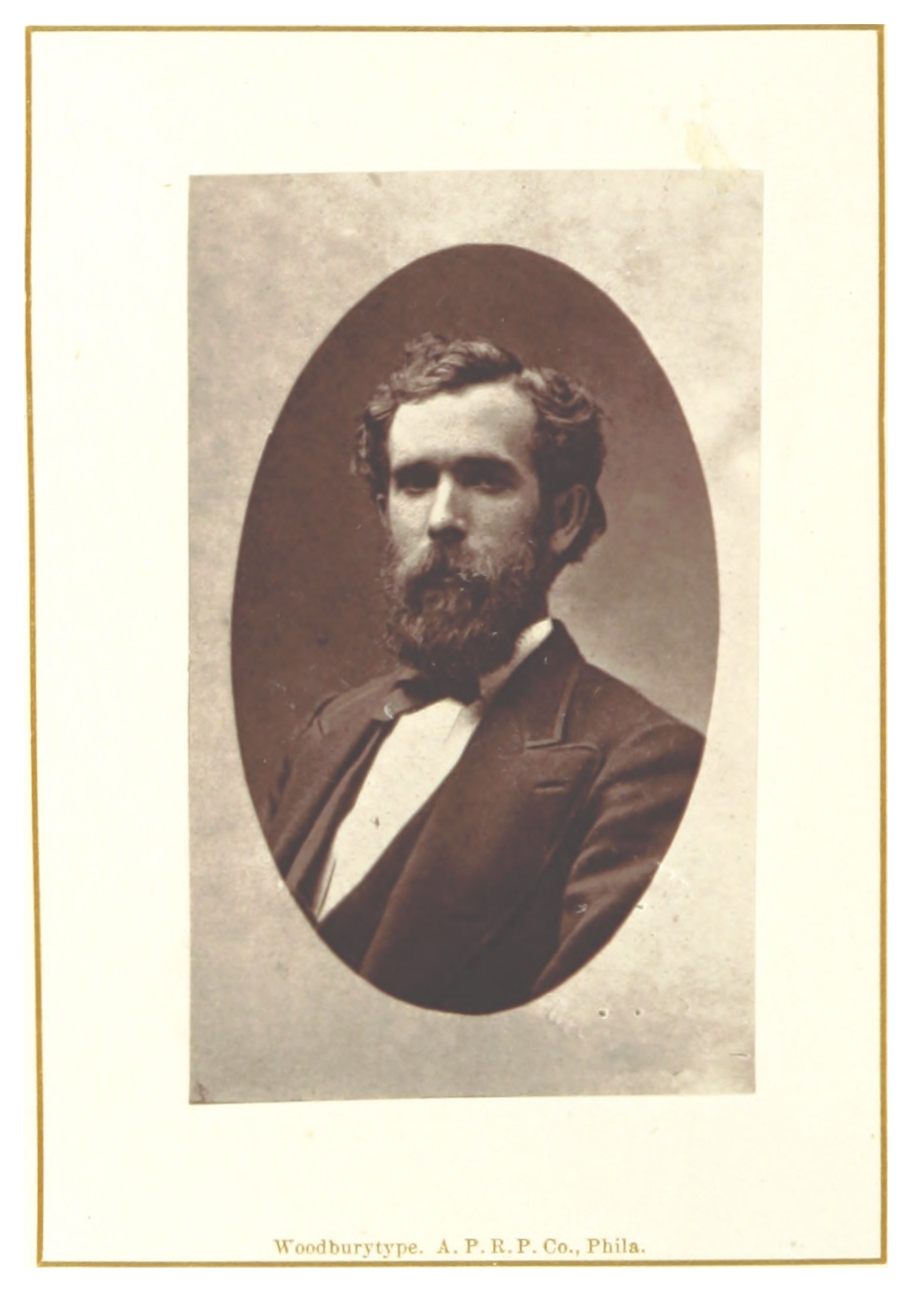
The Grandin brothers Brothers John L., William J., and Elijah B. Grandin
- Born: John L: December 20, 1836, Pleasantville, Pennsylvania; William J: August 16, 1838, Pleasantville, Pennsylvania; Elijah B: December 20, 1840, Tidioute, Pennsylvania
- Died: John L: September 10, 1912 (aged 75); William J: December 7, 1904 (aged 66), Philadelphia; Elijah B: December 3, 1917 (aged 80), District of Columbia
- Occupations: Oil prospectors, bankers, financiers, wheat farmers
- Signatures William J. Grandin Elijah B. Grandin

The Grandin Brothers; John Livingston Grandin (December 20, 1836 – September 10, 1912), William James Grandin (August 16, 1838 – December 7, 1904) and Elijah Bishop Grandin (December 20, 1840 – December 3, 1917) were a sibling trio of American entrepreneurs who were among the first to begin business ventures in commercial oil prospecting in the United States, and who later became involved in banking and Bonanza wheat farming. They eventually became titans of the wheat industry, operating the largest corporate wheat farm in the Dakota Territory (in Grandin, North Dakota) in the late 19th century.

== Historical background ==
Grandin family ancestors reportedly came to America from the Isle of Jersey in the early 1700s. The first generations of Grandins in America found success in the mercantile industry. Samuel Grandin (1800-1888) was born in Sussex County, New Jersey where he was educated only until age 8 or 10, and then left school to apprentice as a tailor and follow his family in mercantile work. In 1822, Samuel Grandin decided to move to Pennsylvania in search of new opportunities. He continued mercantile work there for another 18 years. During this time he married Saran Ann Henry in 1832, and they had seven children, five sons and two daughters; Morris Worts Grandin (deceased in infancy), Stephen Girard Grandin (b.1835; deceased at 16), John Livingston Grandin (b.1836), William James Grandin (b.1838), Elijah Bishop Grandin (b.1840), Maria Jane Grandin (b.1843), and Emma Ann Grandin (b.1849; deceased during childhood).

== Early life ==
The Grandin Brothers; Stephen Girard Grandin (b.1835), John Livingston Grandin (b.1836), and William James Grandin (b.1838), were all born in Pleasantville, Venango County, Pennsylvania. In 1840 their father moved the family to the nearby town of Tidioute. In Tidioute, Elijah Bishop Grandin was born (b.1840) and the boys' father ended his career as a tailor and entered the lumber industry, buying 33 acres of land and building a lumber mill. He began shipping timber down the Allegany River, much of which came from his land. At young ages the Grandin boys quickly followed their father into lumber work. In 1851, Stephen Girard tragically drowned at the age of 16, leaving only three of the five brothers surviving. John Livingston and William James worked in the lumber business early on and at the general store in Tidioute. Their younger brother Elijah Bishop, left home in early adulthood and went to work for the Hyde Bros. Lumber Company in Hydetown, Crawford County, Pennsylvania.

== Second oil well, oil business ==
On August 27, 1859, Edwin Drake dug a successful commercial oil well in Titusville, Pennsylvania which is commonly credited as the first oil well dug specifically as a commercial well in the United States. Days after the Drake well came in, news reached the Grandin General Store in Tidioute approximately 20 miles away. After hearing that Drake was selling barrels of oil at 75 cents each, John Livingston (then aged 23), who knew of petroleum seepage in the area, immediately began buying up small tracts of land surrounding an “oil spring” he knew of. On August 31, 1859, 4 days after the Drake well, John Livingston set up a spring-pole well, a simpler setup than Drake's technique. This well is credited as being the second well dug specifically for commercial oil drilling purposes in the United States. Despite drilling down 134 feet, nearly twice the depth of Drake's well, in an area Grandin had seen petroleum seepage at surface level, Grandin's first well was unsuccessful and dry. John Livingston then recruited his brother William James and after that first unsuccessful attempt, they dug several more wells that were then successful and turned extremely profitable. Around this time Elijah Bishop returned to Pennsylvania to join his brothers in their oil business. Together they set up pipelines and containers. Along with Edwin Drake's, their efforts were a precursor to the Pennsylvania oil rush. According to legend, over the next several years the Grandin Brothers' oil endeavors eventually became so successful that John Livingston set up an appointment to meet John D. Rockefeller, another oil prospector at the time, to negotiate a partnership, but Rockefeller kept him waiting and after a period of time, refusing to wait any longer, Grandin walked out before Rockefeller arrived, possibly forfeiting a chance for them to get in on the ground floor with Standard Oil.

== Grandin Brothers Bank ==
In 1868, after several years of very successful oil endeavors, John Livingston Grandin and a business partner, A. Clark Baum, started a general banking business in Tidioute, founded with oil money. Two years later, John Livingston's brother William James purchased Baum's stake in the business and it became the Grandin Brothers Bank. Around this time the Philadelphia Financier Jay Cooke was undertaking a campaign to sell Northern Pacific Railway securities in his role as principal financier of the project. The Northern Pacific had turned to Cooke after his very successful efforts raising money for the Union Army during the Civil War by selling Civil War securities to investors in England. As the Grandin Bros. Bank grew its capital, the Grandin Brothers decided to use Jay Cooke & Company as one of their bank's depositories. However, in 1873 Cooke & Company went bankrupt, a major cause of the Panic of 1873. Cooke then told his creditors he could only repay them 15 cents on the dollar. Rather than accept 15 cents on the dollar for the considerable sum they were owed, and in turn lose a large portion of their oil profits, the Grandin Brothers decided to consider accepting the only collateral security available on the money. This collateral security was Northern Pacific Railway bonds with certain land purchasing rights to government land grants in the Dakota Territory made to the railroad. The theory for these bonds had been that once the railroad was completed, thus making the surrounding land much more valuable, the investors of the railway could exercise these bonds for a profit. However, since funding for the railroad ceased in 1873, so did the construction, and this land was thousands of acres of uninhabited prairie and wilderness in the Dakota Territory and beyond with no finished railway to reach them.

== Western exploration, Dakota bonanza farming ==
In 1875, John Livingston went out to the Red River Valley of the Dakota Territory to inspect this land himself. He traveled to the farthest settlement into the territory, Fargo, which was then just a town of tents. At Fargo he hired an experienced Colonel and together they trekked fifty miles north in the Red River Valley to the government railroad land. Along the way they encountered a frontiersman living on the Red River and growing a small amount of wheat for himself. Considering what could be done with the land, John Livingston noted the rich surface soil and thick clay sub-soil, and recognized the good conditions for growing more wheat. He surveyed and marked off two townships, having the possibility to buy the odd sections. On reporting this survey to the Department of Interior in Moorhead, Minnesota, the survey was accepted. Deciding to exercise the Grandin Brothers' right to the Railroad Bonds with government land purchasing rights, he then purchased 26,000 acres (11,000 ha) of Rail Road land. He also bought another 2,560 acres (1,040 ha) of government land at a discount, by promising the U.S. Government at the Department of Interior that they would put aside land to put up a town thus helping to develop the country as there were no known settlers living on the prairie there at that time. (The town they put up became Grandin, North Dakota)

Knowing little about farming and interested in getting back to the banking, oil and lumber businesses in Pennsylvania, John Livingston contacted Oliver Dalrymple, a land speculator also from Pennsylvania who was cultivating half a section [320 acres (130 ha)] of wheat in nearby Minnesota, the largest known farm in the area at the time. The Grandin Brothers hired Dalrymple to get a corporate wheat farm up and running on a large portion of their land. As their success grew, they purchased more land and at the Grandin Farm's height they possessed by some accounts 86,000 acres (35,000 ha; 134 sq mi) of the best wheat land in the American continent, and employed over 400 workers. Not a single year passed where their profits did not exceed the original amount owed to them by Jay Cooke & Company.

Since the Grandin Brothers now owned several miles of land along the Red River, in order to quickly get the cultivated wheat to market they set up the Grandin Steamboat Line of steamboats and barges to transport both wheat and passengers down to Fargo. In Fargo they set up a 50,000-US-bushel (1,800 m^{3}) grain elevator on the railroad line to carry the wheat to market. By 1888 however, much of the steamboat traffic had been replaced by trains.

== Grandin Farm land liquidation ==
After amassing sizable fortunes, the Grandin Brothers began to slowly reduce the Grandin Farm holdings, by selling off half sections [320 acres (130 ha)]and full sections [640 acres (260 ha)] at a time, in then developed North Dakota, for vastly more than they originally paid for them. By their deaths in the early 20th century, much of the land had been sold off. In 1920, John Livingston Grandin Jr., the son of John Livingston Grandin sold the remaining 3,259 acres (1,319 ha) as the final disposition of the Grandin Land. However the buyer was deceased 3 years later, and with the mortgage unpaid, the land was repossessed. It was then supervised by a member of the Grandin Family and rented from 1923 until 1934, when the land was conveyed to the Grandin Land Trust, to be sold when another buyer was found. The land was finally again sold outright in 1948, marking the true final disposition of Grandin land.

== Descendants ==
- John Livingston Grandin Jr. (son of John Livingston Grandin) continued the family business endeavors until his death in 1963. He attended Harvard University; in 1905 was a passenger on the first purpose built cruise ship, the Prinzessin Victoria Luise; and during WWI was the Director for the Red Cross Bureau of Supplies for the Northeast Division.
- Temple Grandin (great-granddaughter of John Livingston Grandin), professor of Animal Science and autism advocate.

== See also ==
- Grandin, Missouri
