= Cushman K. Davis =

American politician (1838–1900)

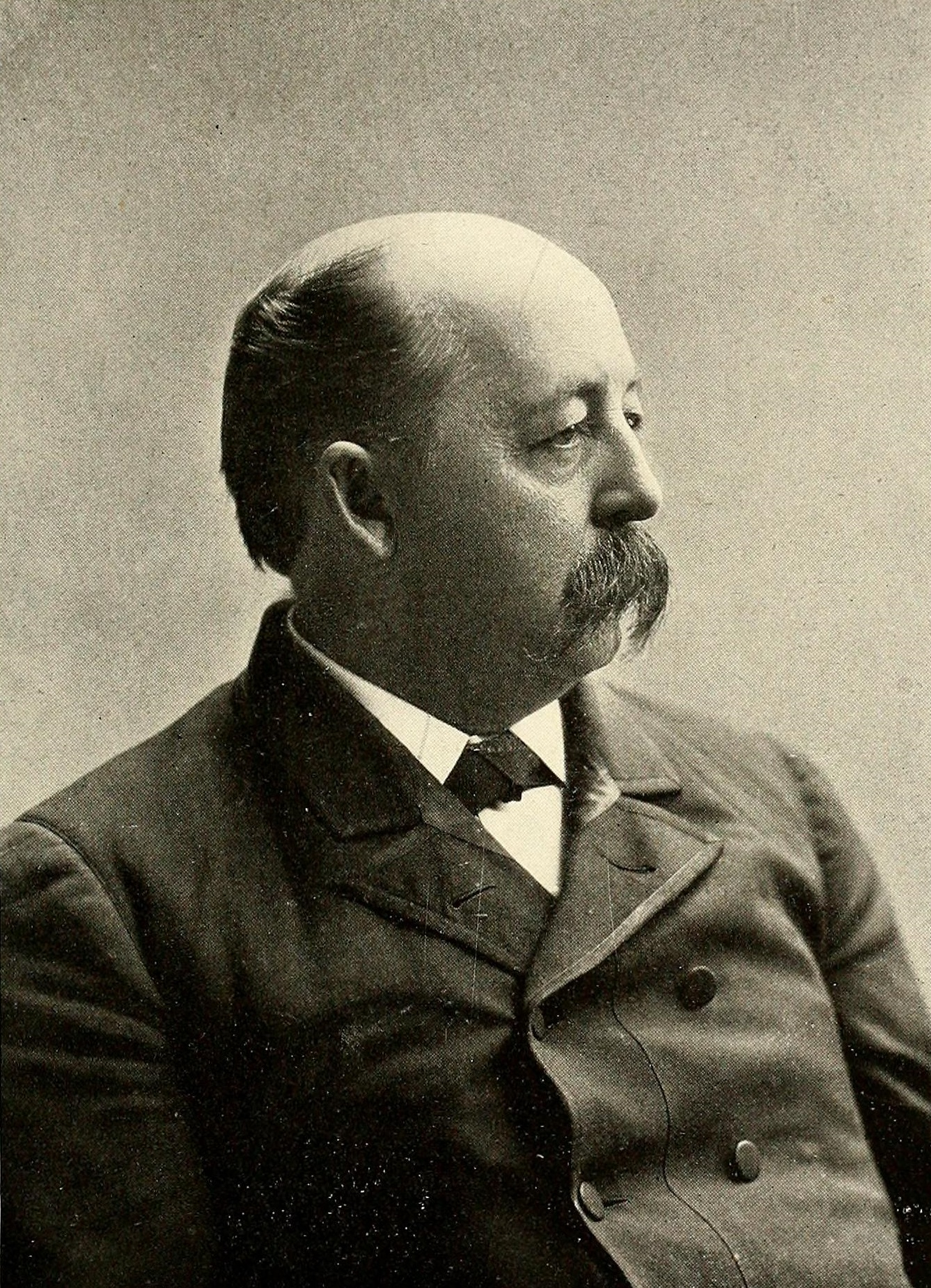

United States Senator from Minnesota
- In office March 4, 1887 – November 27, 1900
- Preceded by: Samuel J. R. McMillan
- Succeeded by: Charles A. Towne

7th Governor of Minnesota
- In office January 7, 1874 – January 7, 1876
- Lieutenant: Alphonso Barto
- Preceded by: Horace Austin
- Succeeded by: John S. Pillsbury

Member of the Minnesota House of Representatives
- In office 1867–1868

Personal details
- Born: Cushman Kellogg Davis; June 16, 1838 Henderson, New York, U.S.
- Died: November 27, 1900 (aged 62) Saint Paul, Minnesota, U.S.
- Resting place: Oakland Cemetery, Saint Paul, Minnesota
- Party: Republican
- Spouse(s): Laura Bowman (1st), Anna Malcom Agnew Fox (2nd)
- Parent: Horatio N. Davis (father)
- Education: Carroll College; University of Michigan

Military service
- Branch/service: Union Army
- Years of service: 1861–1864
- Rank: First Lieutenant
- Unit: 28th Wisconsin Volunteer Infantry Regiment
- Battles/wars: American Civil War

Cushman Kellogg Davis (June 16, 1838 – November 27, 1900) was an American Republican politician who served as the seventh governor of Minnesota and as a U.S. senator from Minnesota.

== Early life and American Civil War ==
Davis was born in Henderson, New York to Horatio N. Davis and Clarissa Cushman. His family moved to Wisconsin Territory before he was a year old (his father went on to serve as a member of the Wisconsin State Senate several different times). Cushman went to school at Carroll College and then the University of Michigan, graduating in 1857. Admitted to the bar in 1860, he soon after found himself serving in the American Civil War in the 28th Wisconsin Volunteer Infantry Regiment, serving first as a lieutenant in charge of Company B of this volunteer regiment. He was in action in the western campaigns, then in 1864 as an aide to General Willis A. Gorman.

== Political career ==
Davis returned home in 1864 due to poor health. He relocated to St. Paul, Minnesota, due to its reputation as a health resort and began to pursue a legal and political career. He was elected to the Minnesota State House of Representatives from 1867 to 1868 and was appointed as the United States District Attorney from 1868 to 1873. He resigned his position to run as the Republican candidate for Minnesota governor and won. Davis was elected in one of the most contentious primaries for his party, only winning his party's nomination by three votes.

=== As Governor ===
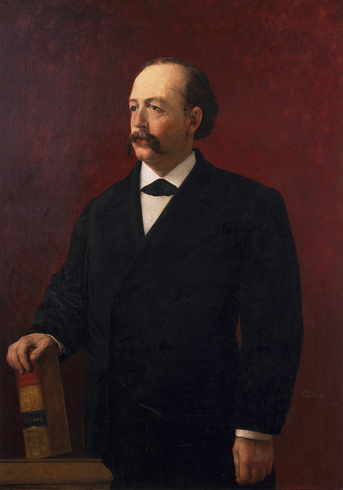
Davis during his time as Governor of Minnesota

During his term, he established a state board of railway commissioners, revised the state constitution to allow women to vote on school matters and hold elected office, and also provided assistance to farmers affected by a locust plague. He served one term from 1874 to 1876 and declined to be re-nominated for a second.

He continued the policies of his predecessor Horace Austin in attempting to curb corporate power in the state, which he called "Modern Feudalism".

== Return to legal career and second political career ==
Returning to his legal career, Davis successfully defended Judge Sherman Page in his 1878 impeachment trial. He also formed a partnership with Frank B. Kellogg and Cordenio Severance. In 1887, he was elected to the United States Senate. He would serve in the 50th, 51st, 52nd, 53rd, 54th, 55th, and 56th United States Congresses, from 1887 to 1900. He was involved with legislation related to pensions and the construction of the Soo Locks. Beginning in 1897 he was the chair of the Senate Foreign Relations Committee and was closely involved with the sequence of events leading to the Spanish–American War. He was also present at the talks for the Treaty of Paris which ended the war.

== Personal life ==
Davis married Laura Bowman in 1862. He remarried Anna Malcom Agnew Fox at some point in the 1880s.

== Honors ==
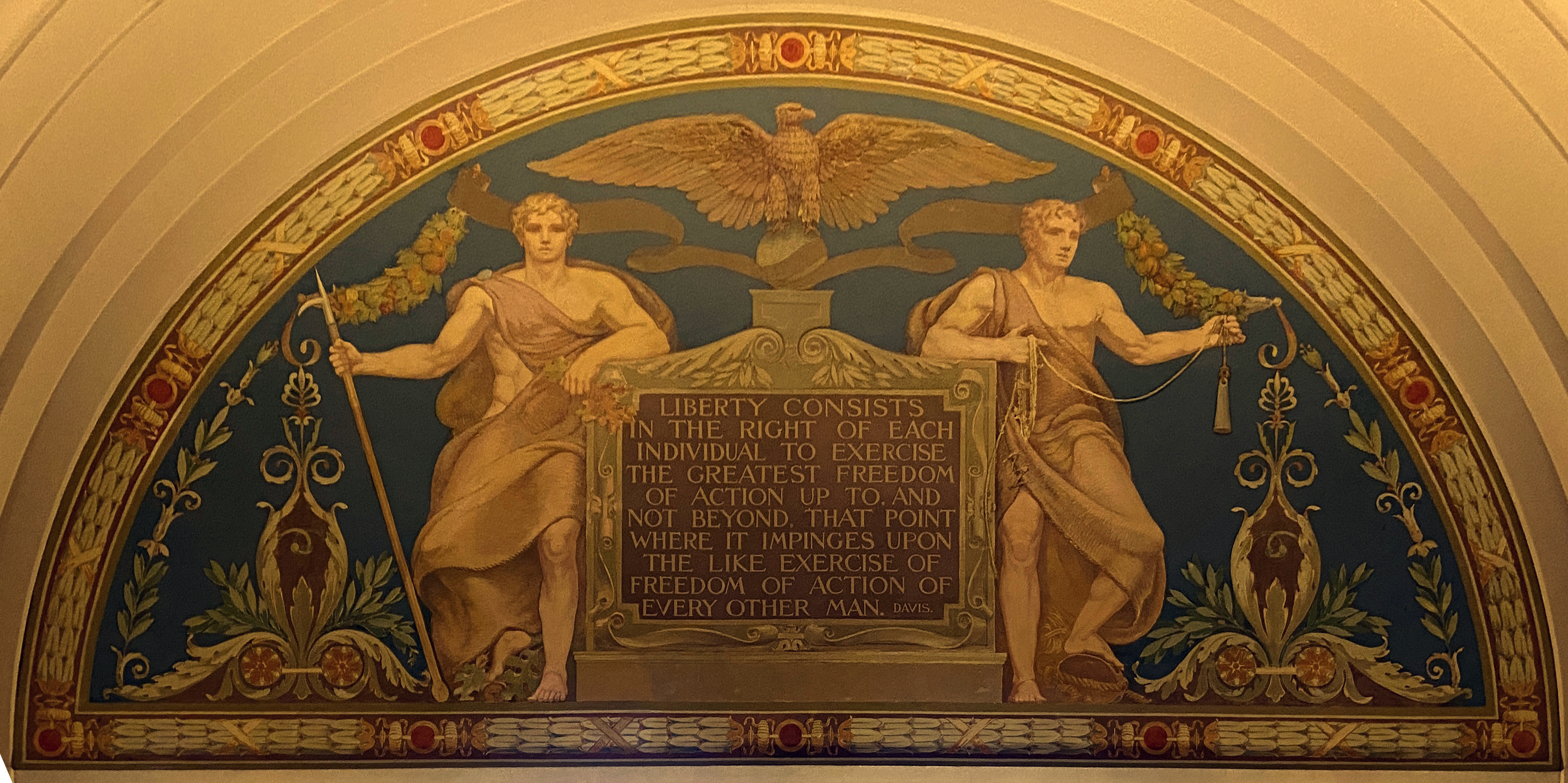
Davis quote

Davis was elected a member of the American Antiquarian Society in 1894. He was elected a vice-president general of the National Society of the Sons of the American Revolution in 1895. One of Davis' quotes is featured in the Minnesota State Capitol, alongside one of Alexander Hamilton. The quote is; "Liberty consists in the right of each individual to exercise the greatest freedom of action up to, and not beyond that point where it impinges upon the like exercise of freedom of action of every other man." Also in the state capitol, his official portrait is on display, and a bust of him is located in the chamber of the Minnesota Senate.

== Death ==
Davis died while still in office in St. Paul on November 27, 1900. He is buried at Arlington National Cemetery in Virginia.

== See also ==
- List of members of the United States Congress who died in office (1900–1949)

Party political offices
Preceded by Horace Austin	Republican nominee for Governor of Minnesota; 1873	Succeeded by John S. Pillsbury
Political offices
Preceded by Horace Austin	Governor of Minnesota; 1874–1876	Succeeded by John S. Pillsbury
U.S. Senate
Preceded by Samuel J. R. McMillan	U.S. senator (Class 1) from Minnesota; 1887–1900; Served alongside: Dwight M. Sabin, William D. Washburn; Knute Nelson	Succeeded by Charles A. Towne
