= Bonanza farms =

Very large farms established in the United States during the late nineteenth century

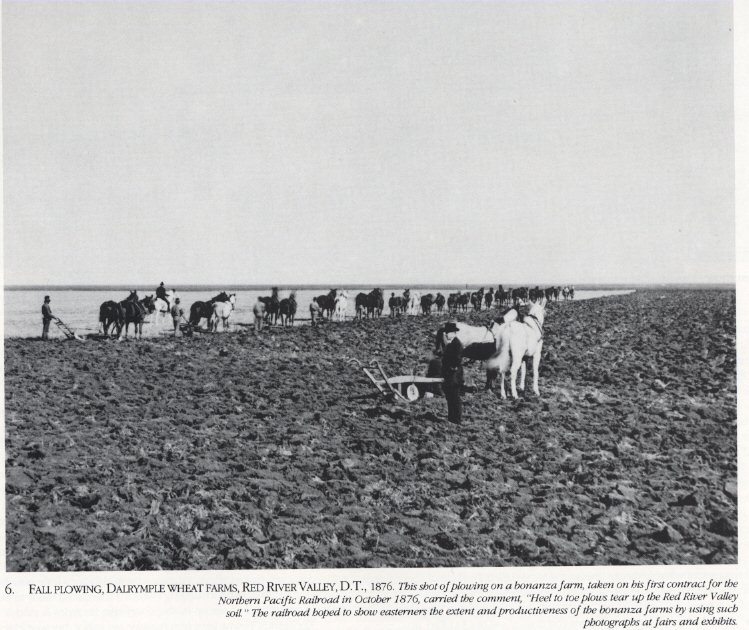
Fall plowing, Dalrymple Farms, D.T. 1876 by Frank Jay Haynes

Bonanza farms were very large farms established in the western United States during the late nineteenth century. They conducted large-scale operations, mostly cultivating and harvesting wheat. Bonanza farms developed as a result of a number of factors, including the efficient new machinery of the 1870s, cheap abundant land available during that period, the growth of eastern markets in the U.S., and completion of most major railroads between the farming areas and markets.

Most bonanza farms were owned by companies and run like factories, with professional managers. The first bonanza farms were established in the mid-1870s in the Red River Valley in Minnesota and in Dakota Territory, such as the Grandin Farm. Developers bought land close to the Northern Pacific Railroad, for ease of transport of their wheat to market. Investors also organized bonanza farms farther west.

Many bonanza farms were established in this period in North Dakota; a number have been preserved.

== Origins of bonanza farms ==
Bonanza farms were encouraged by John Wesley Powell who, by the 1870s, had found that the land he studied needed larger-scale irrigation systems that would lead to larger areas of land being taken care of. Powell, a geologist, asserted that family-owned farms that had been in use in accordance to the Homestead Act of 1862 did not quite give the land the type of help required to keep it fit.

== Role of farm technology ==
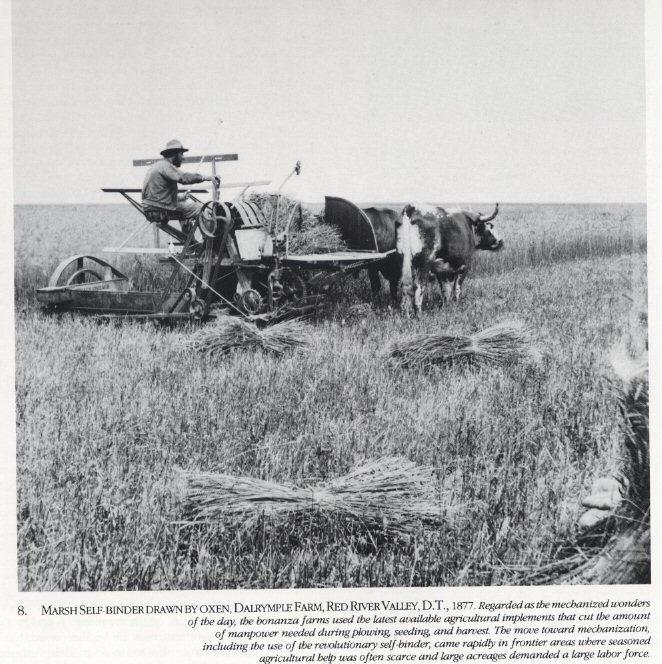
Marsh Self Binder, Red River Valley, D.T. 1877

Bonanza farmers pioneered the development of farm technology and economics. They used steam engines to power plowing as much as 4 decades before the modern farm tractor made its appearance - plows and combine harvesters drawn by steam tractors were used in the West in the 1880s and 1890s. The division of labor was applied in bonanza farms generations before family farms adapted to these modern ways. Farm boys from the Midwest, working on bonanza farms in the early 20th century, transplanted these ideas to Corn Belt homesteads and built larger farms as the century progressed.

== Historic site ==
The Frederick A. and Sophia Bagg Bonanza Farm is located in southeastern corner of North Dakota. It was designated as a National Historic Landmark in 2005.

== See also ==
- History of agriculture in the United States#Wheat
- Corporate farming
- Days of Heaven – film depiction of a fictional bonanza farm
