= Dunwoody College of Technology =

Private college in Minneapolis, Minnesota, US

- Type: Private technical college
- Established: 1914
- Endowment: $68.1 million (2025)
- President: Scott Stallman
- Students: 1,548
- Location: Minneapolis, Minnesota, United States; 44°58′21″N 93°17′25″W
- Campus: Urban, 15 acres (6.1 ha)
- Colors
- Website: www.dunwoody.edu

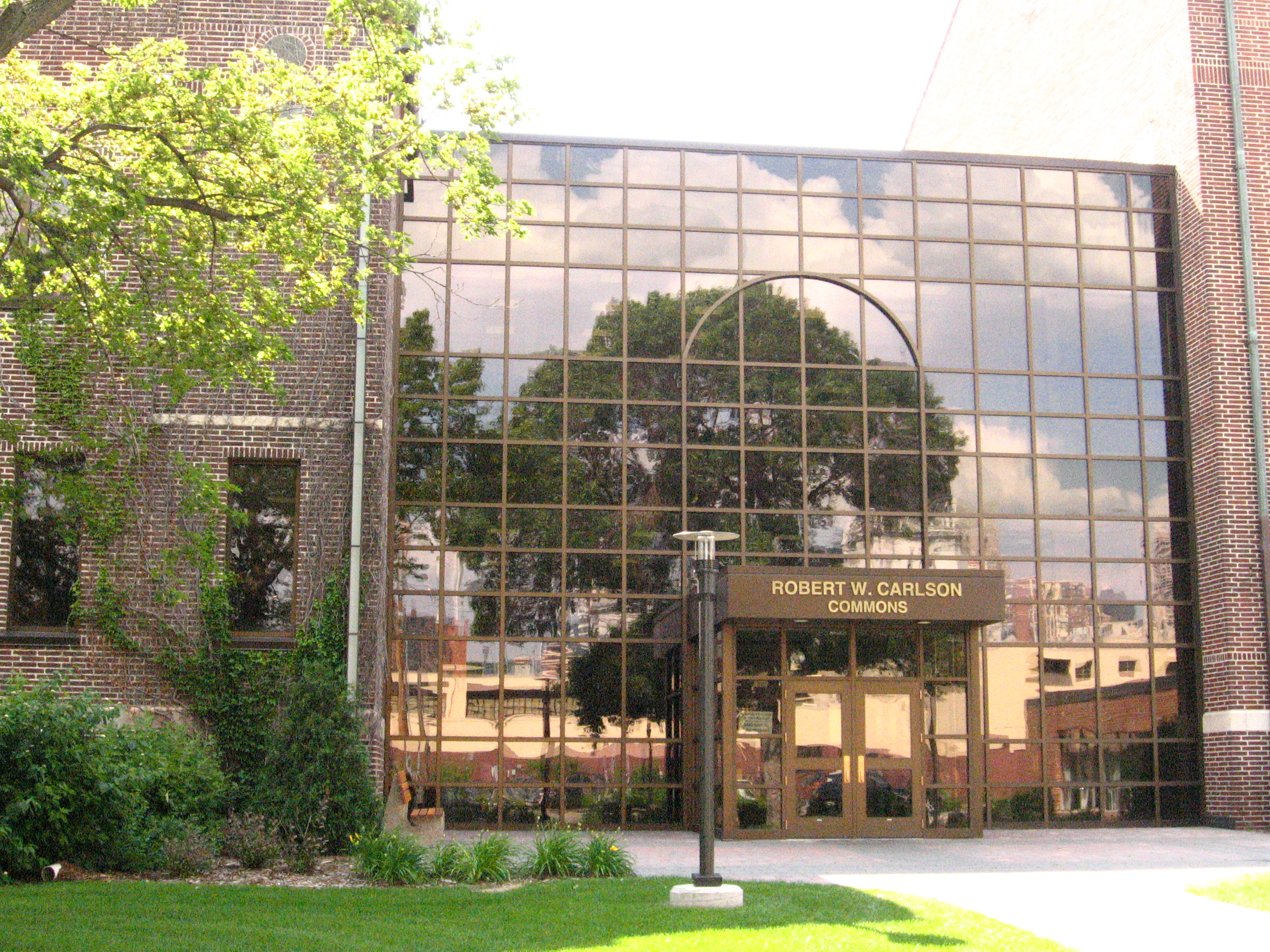
Carlson Commons

Dunwoody College of Technology is a private technology school in Minneapolis, Minnesota. It offers Bachelor of Science (B.S.), Bachelor of Architecture (B. Arch) and Associate of Applied Science (A.A.S.) degrees.

== History ==
Dunwoody College was founded as a technical institute in 1914, when Minneapolis businessman William Hood Dunwoody left three million dollars in his will to "provide for all time a place where youth without distinction on account of race, color or religious prejudice, may learn the useful trades and crafts, and thereby fit themselves for the better performance of life's duties." When his widow, Kate L. Dunwoody, died a year later she left additional funds to the school.

In the spring of 1916, the Dunwoody Trustees purchased six city blocks, 3 long and 2 deep, facing the parade grounds. The Minneapolis City Council closed the streets and alleys that traversed the area creating a site of approximately 16 acres (6.5 ha). Hewitt and Brown Architects and Engineers were contracted to design a school building. Their draft included nine buildings: six shop buildings and a three-story administration facility with an auditorium on one side and a gymnasium on the other.

The first two buildings opened in August 1917 and still exist. The Minneapolis Public Library had a branch on campus. Located across from St. Mary’s Basilica and Loring Park, just west of downtown, the new facility was dedicated on October 31, 1917, and the space at Minneapolis Central High School was left empty. University of Minnesota President Marion L. Burton gave the address. Prosser’s May 1918 commencement address contrasted the new facility with the old one used in cooperation with the Minneapolis school district: “Roughly four years ago we were quartered in an old, tumble-down building that, with the kindness of the board of education, served us well in time of need.”

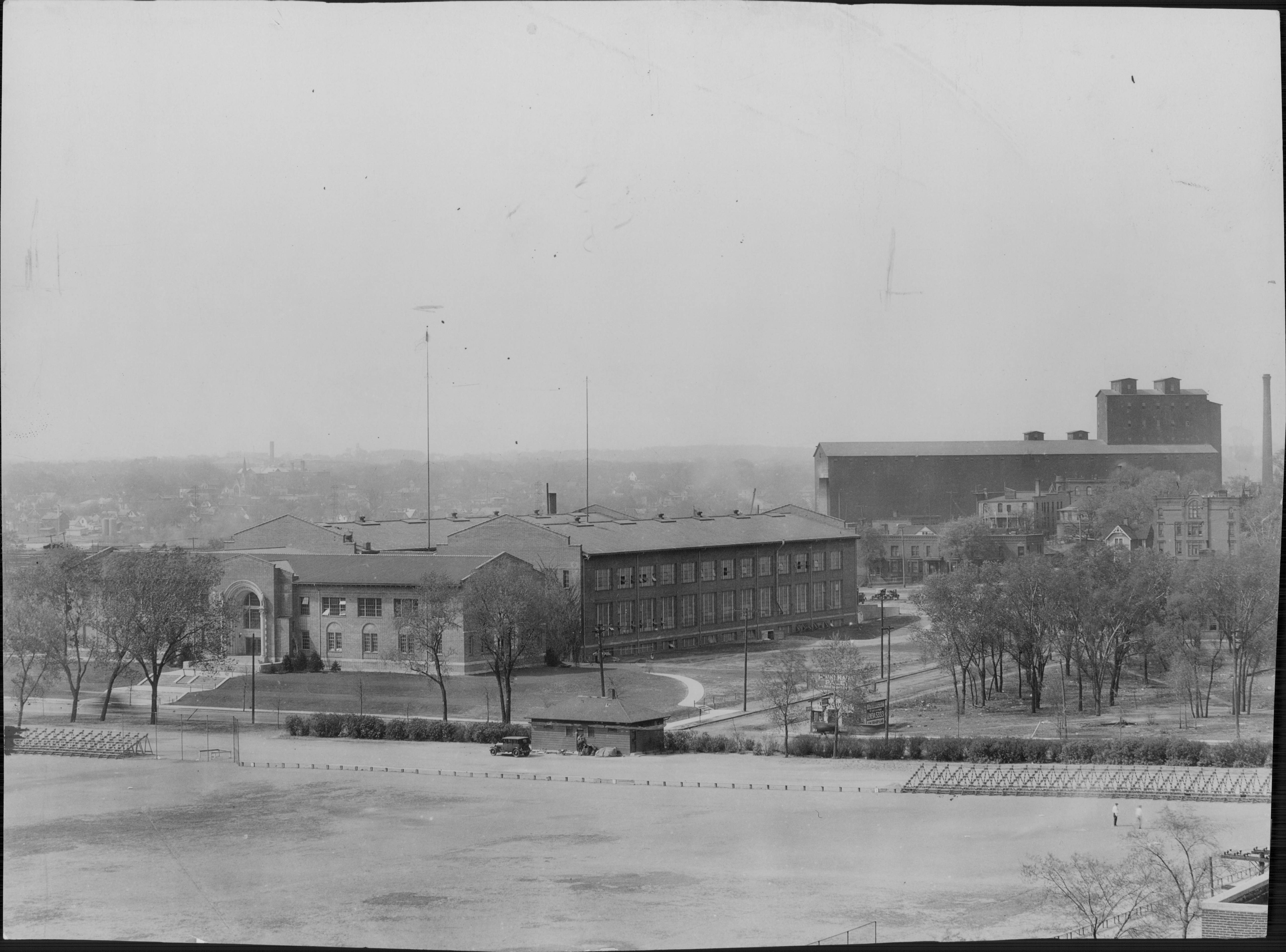
Dunwoody Institute Campus in the 1920's

When the University of Minnesota perceived a need to prepare instructors to teach in the emerging area of vocational education, it began to look for partnerships. On April 22, 1920, U of M President Fred Snyder entered into a cooperative agreement with Dunwoody Institute allowing students enrolled at the university in teacher training courses to spend part of their class time at Dunwoody to observe and practice all types of trade and industrial education. This reciprocity allowed Dunwoody instructors to enroll in and receive credit for courses offered by the College of Education at the university that were part of the teacher training authorized by the Smith Hughes Act. These matriculations were considered scholarships and did not encumber the university or the Institute in monetary exchanges, only the awarding of credits. There were no other recognizable post-secondary technical institutes or colleges at this time in Minnesota.

During World War II, Japanese American students in concentration camps were invited to study at Dunwoody.

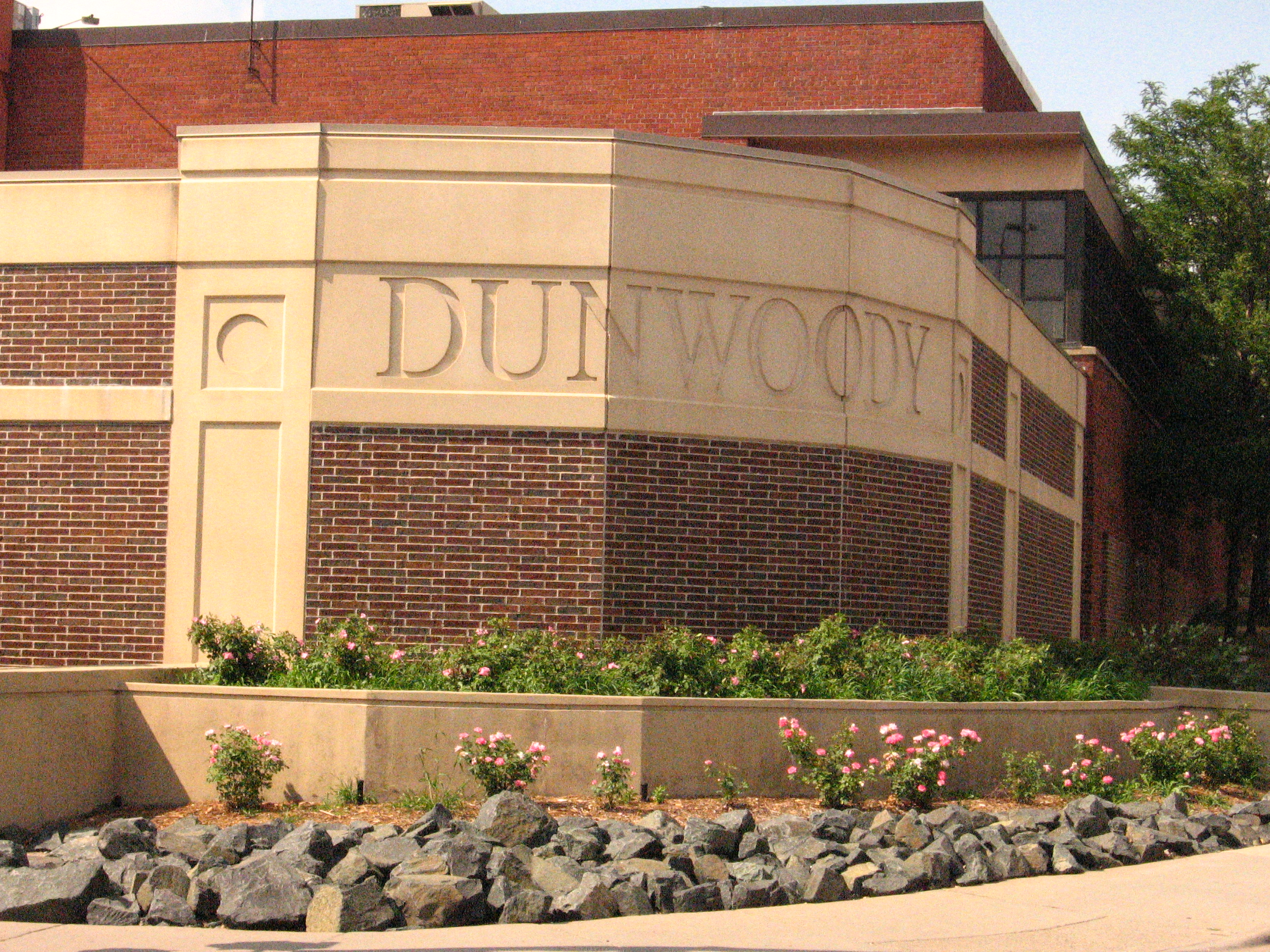
Dunwoody College

In 1953 the Ford Foundation gave Dunwoody a grant to send representatives to consult with the Indonesian Ministry of Education. Under the leadership of Dunwoody’s second director, J. R. Kingman, an Indonesian Technical Teacher Training Institute was to be established in Bandung, Java. An American, Milton G Towner, was its advisor and director. He was on leave as director of the Staff College of the Federal Civil Defense Administration in Washington, DC. Six American teachers from Dunwoody were sent with Towner to work with indigenous Indonesians to make training available to prospective and interested teachers in the Indonesian technical school system. Seven Indonesian teachers were sent to Dunwoody for training so they could return and support Towner's efforts. On November 27, 1953, K. Nagaraja Rao, a graduate of the University of Mysore in India, became the head of Dunwoody Industrial Institute’s new International Services Division. He had previously taught at the Illinois Institute of Technology and Korean Technical Institute, where he opened a department of chemical engineering. His job was to be the liaison between the Indonesia project and the Ford Foundation. Since 1951, he had been a consultant to the Indonesian government on the development of indigenous industries.

Phillip S. Van Wyck became the senior advisor of the Government Technical Institute in Insein, Kale, Burma. The institute's development and operation was funded by the Ford Foundation and assisted with staffing from Dunwoody. In 1956 Dunwoody began its third technical assistance program, in the Union of Burma, establishing the first technical high school in Rangoon. In a government-sponsored building, four Dunwoody employees assisted the Burmese in developing shops, curriculum and demonstration materials. Burmese instructors were delivered the curriculum. The Annual Report of the Ford Foundation noted Dunwoody Institute’s efforts in Insein and Rangoon. It also noted that a second Teacher’s Institute was started in Jakarta.

The Central Training Institute in Bombay, India, opened in March 1963 with the assistance of a five-member team from Dunwoody, the Indian government and the US Department of Education. The March 29, 1963 issue of the Dunwoody News contains a facsimile of the formal invitation indicating that Prime Minister Nehru of India would address the institute's inauguration ceremony. That year another project began in Khartoum, Sudan, to establish the Khartoum Senior Trade school. It opened in December 1964. Rao left Dunwoody in 1965 to become a program officer for the Ford Foundation’s Latin American program after a 12-year tenure. Robert R. Minarik, a graduate of the Dunwoody electronics program and the University of Minnesota, replaced Rao, bringing his experience from Burma and Saudi Arabia.

In 1967 Dunwoody began overseas programs with funding from private industries rather than foundations or U.S. government sponsorship. The first initiative was with the Alumina Partners of Jamaica (ALPART). ALPART asked the institute to organize and implement a training school for construction and maintenance workers. This ALPART Training Center for Industrial Skills was to serve the ALPART greenfield alumina refinery in Nain, Jamaica. A senior team of Dunwoody employees would begin to train and set in place Jamaican personnel as trainers. Time-release training aimed at select job targets dovetailed with on-the-job training and specifically customized training manuals. This partnership came to a successful conclusion in the fall of 1972. During this time, a nine-member Dunwoody team worked with Esso Standard Libya Inc at the Marsa el Brega terminal in Libya. This refinery and production complex provided an opportunity to develop curricula for and operate ESSO’s Industrial Training Center. In Saudi Arabia, the Arabian American Oil Company (ARAMCO) began a long-term training relationship that lasted into the '80s. New hardware and software for basic and mid-level electric and electronic training at the Ras Tanura Industrial Training shops were targeted. The curriculum developed there was transferable to two other sites: one in Dhahran and the other in Abqaiq. Freeport Indonesia Inc hired a Dunwoody team to help with its copper mining project in Irian Jaya. The objective was to assist in training the indigenous Indonesian workforce as electrical, mechanical, and mobile machinery operators at the townsite of Tembaga Pura. These mining facilities were remote, the Indonesians from jungle tribes and the size of the enterprise larger than Dunwoody had ever attempted before.

In 2000 Jane Plihal, associate professor and chair of the Department of Work, Community and Family Education at the College of Education and Human Development, reevaluated the 1920 “Cooperative Agreement Between Dunwoody Industrial Institute and the University of Minnesota.” She proposed termination of the agreement, seeing it as anachronistic and no longer expressive of the ways in which the two institutions had been cooperating or could cooperate. A notice of termination for this agreement signed on December 28, 2000, by Robert H. Bruininks, Executive Vice President and Provost, voided the reciprocity agreement between the two institutions at the end of summer session 2001.

In 2003 Dunwoody merged with NEI College of Technology of Columbia Heights, Minnesota, which specialized in electronics and computer technology. NEI's operations were moved to the Dunwoody campus and the old campus sold and demolished. The combined institution was renamed the Dunwoody College of Technology.

In 2004 Dunwoody took decisive steps to diversify a student body that had long been almost exclusively white and male, hiring a director of diversity and increasing the percentage of students of color to 20%.

In 2007, the college sponsored a new charter high school in North Minneapolis, Dunwoody Academy.

== See also ==
- List of colleges and universities in Minnesota
- Higher education in Minnesota
- Dunwoody Village#William Hood Dunwoody
