= William Hood Dunwoody =

American banker, merchant, miller, art patron and philanthropist

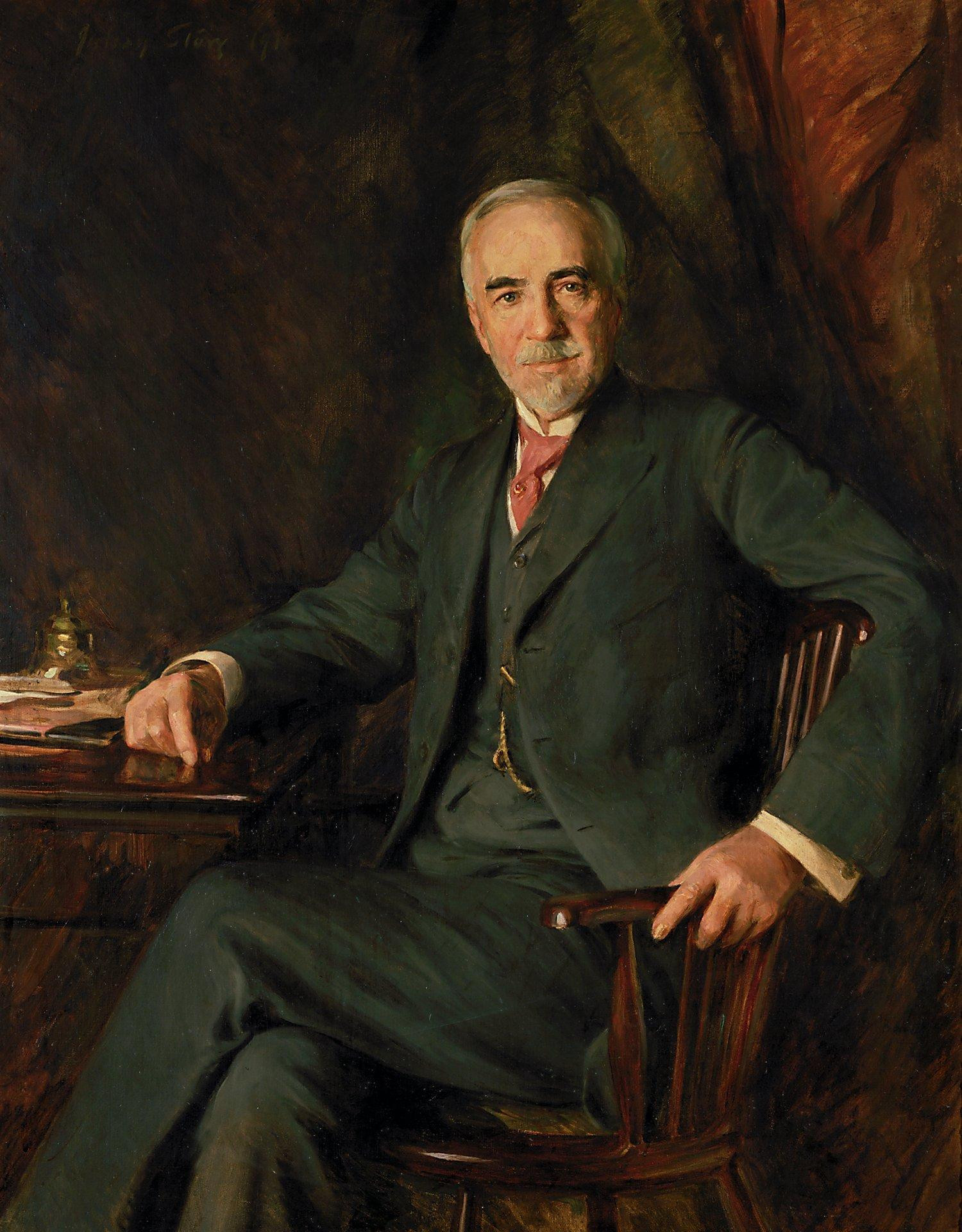
- Portrait of William Hood Dunwoody by Julian Russell Story (1911)
- Born: March 14, 1841; Westtown Township, Pennsylvania, U.S.
- Died: February 8, 1914 (aged 72); Minneapolis, Minnesota, U.S.
- Resting place: Lakewood Cemetery
- Occupation: businessperson

Signature
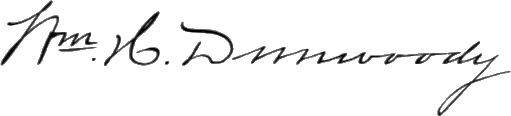

William Hood Dunwoody (March 14, 1841 – February 8, 1914) was an American banker, merchant, miller, art patron and philanthropist. He was a partner in what is today General Mills and for thirty years a leader of Northwestern National Bank, today's Wells Fargo.

Dunwoody sold American flour to British bakers, creating an export market and environment in which Minneapolis, Minnesota, became for a time the world's center of flour milling. By 1901, he was one of sixteen millionaires in Minneapolis.

He is remembered today for his bequests that created the Dunwoody Institute (now the Dunwoody College of Technology), Abbott Hospital (now Allina Health), and The William Hood Dunwoody Fund of the Minneapolis Institute of Art.

== Early years and family ==
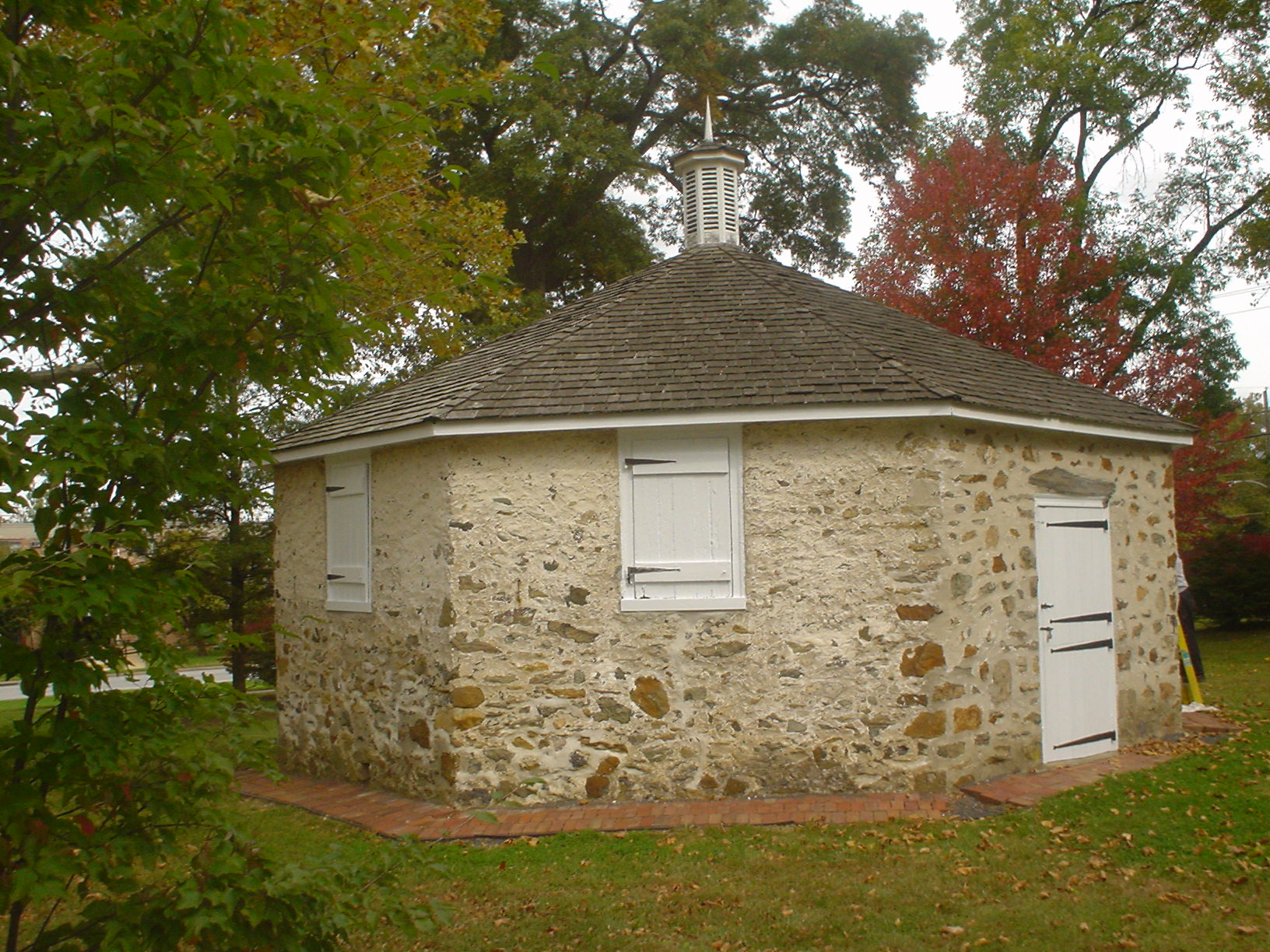
Dunwoody attended the Hood Octagonal School, built by his father, James Dunwoody, in 1842.

Of Scottish descent, Dunwoody was a Quaker but worshiped as a Presbyterian at Westminster Presbyterian Church. In 1684 his maternal ancestors John and Ann Hood and their family emigrated from Castle Donington in Leicestershire to Pennsylvania. Dunwoody visited the area in 1893, when he and the genealogist he hired tried and failed to find a Quaker meeting place.

He was born March 14, 1841, in Westtown, Chester County, Pennsylvania, about eleven miles from Philadelphia, to James and Hannah (Hood) Dunwoody, who were farmers. He had two brothers—Evan, who lived in Colorado Springs and survived him, and John, who died in Minneapolis. Dunwoody went to local country schools, and at fourteen he attended an academy in Philadelphia. He then worked for five years with his uncle Ezekiel Dunwoody, who owned a grain and feed business in Philadelphia. Then as senior partner at age 23, he started his own business, Dunwoody & Robertson, and became a flour merchant.

He and Kate L. Dunwoody (née Patten) married in 1868; they had no children. They made a permanent move to Minneapolis in 1869, when Dunwoody was 28. William Channing Whitney built their first home at Mary Place & 10th Street in 1882, and they later donated the house to the Woman's Boarding Home.

Whitney built their second home in 1905. Called Overlook, the Tudor Revival house had 42 rooms. After a 20-year battle between the neighborhood association and a developer, it was demolished in 1967.

== Minneapolis flour milling ==
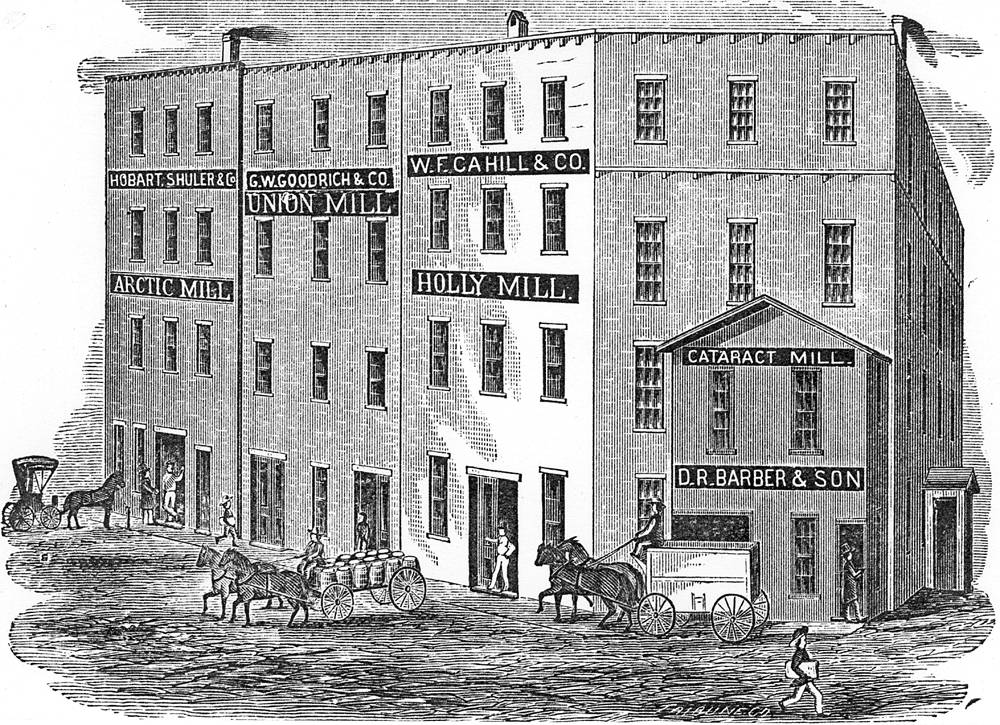
The Arctic and Union mills are at left (pictured in 1878).

To start, Dunwoody represented businesses in the east as a flour buyer. In 1871 his business was organized as Tiffany, Dunwoody & Co., under which he owned and managed the Arctic mill; Dunwoody also owned and managed the Union mill and was a member of H. Darrow & Company.

Dunwoody distinguished himself by organizing the Minneapolis Miller's Association, under which millers for a time cooperated in buying wheat. The organization became the Minneapolis Chamber of Commerce.

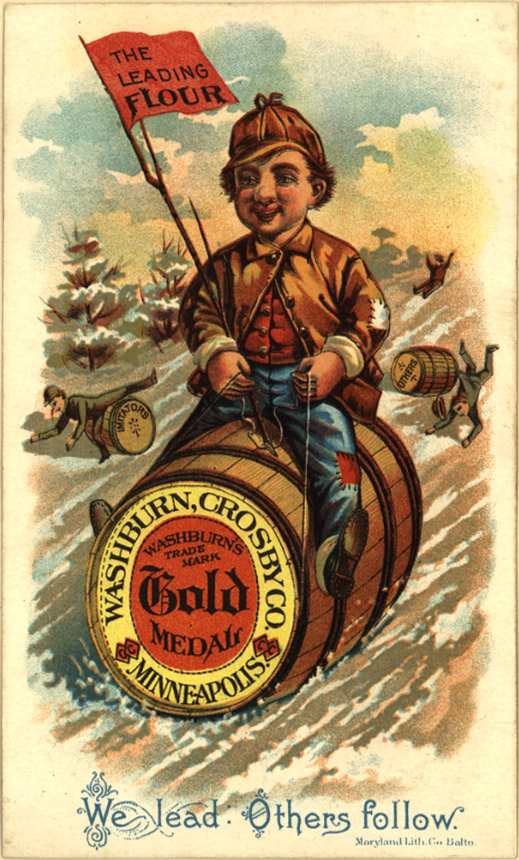
Washburn, Crosby Co. advertisement, late 1880s

He agreed with Cadwallader C. Washburn that flour could be sold directly to the United Kingdom and in 1877 Washburn arranged his trip there. Through "clouds of insults, uncertainties, and rumors," "Dunwoody made his quiet way." Eventually in 1878 English bakers realized that American flour made more loaves per barrel than English flour. Dunwoody overcame "most determined opposition", successfully arranged for direct export, and set patterns of business that persisted for years. Exports to the United Kingdom and continental Europe increased from a few hundred barrels in 1877 or 1878 to four million barrels in 1895. By 1900 exports peaked at about one third the output of Minneapolis mills.

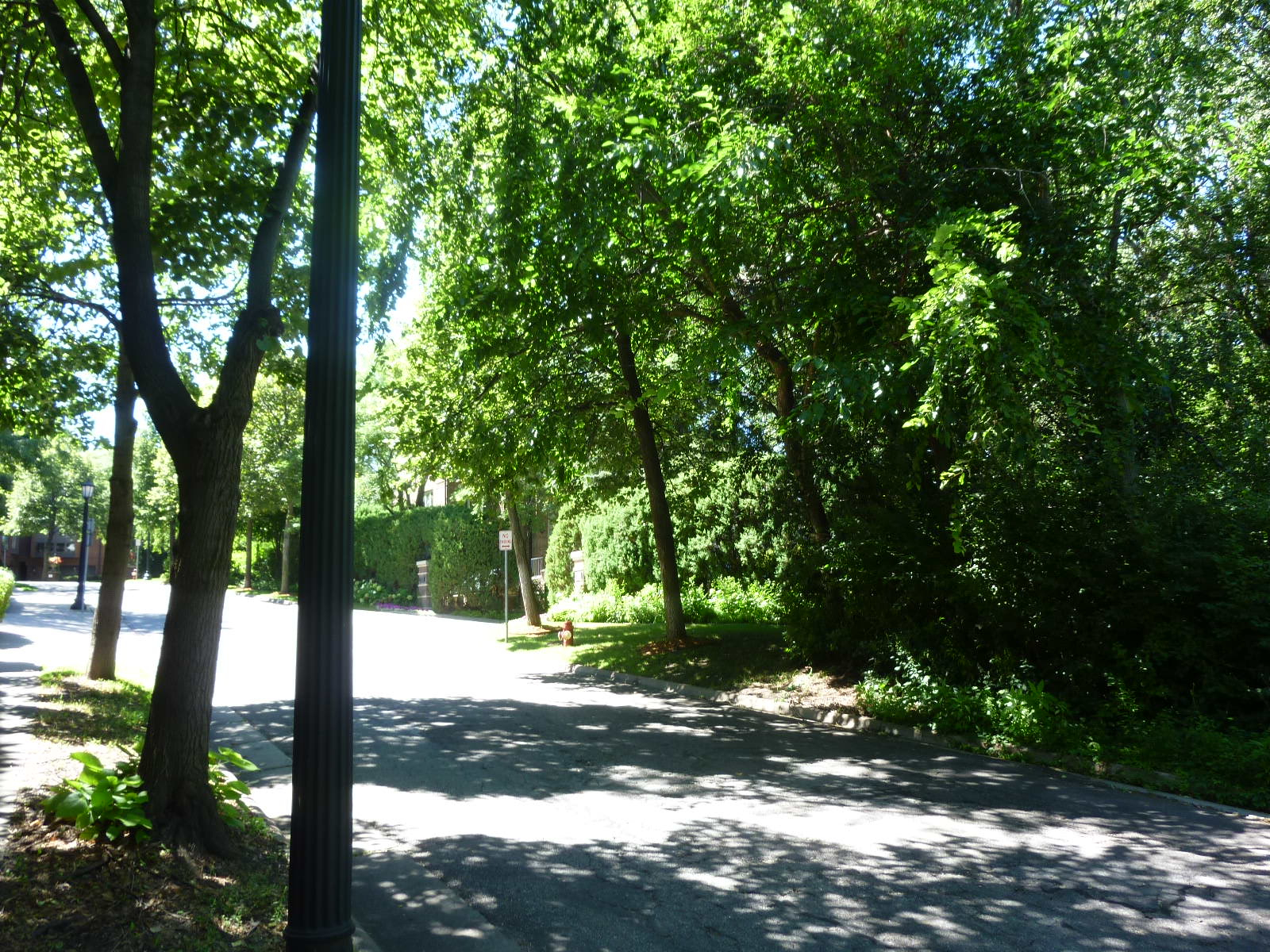
Vicinity of the Dunwoody home in Minneapolis. A townhouse project replaced the house in 1981, a decade after it had been demolished.

He became a silent partner in Washburn-Crosby & Company (which became General Mills) with Washburn, John Crosby and Charles Martin. There he oversaw the development of the production of "new process" white flour. The prevailing motto of the time, reflecting Dunwoody's influence and the company's deep conservatism, was, "Addition, division, silence." A reserved and shrewd capitalist, he served a time as vice president of the company and was sometimes in demand because of his banking connections.

In 1888, after Washburn had died and Dunwoody himself was ill, he traveled to Philadelphia to recruit James Stroud Bell (father of James Ford Bell, who founded General Mills in 1928). After the Pillsbury company was sold to foreign investors, in 1889 Dunwoody helped Bell stop an English syndicate from buying their company. Then United States Milling Company of New York started to speculate and succeeded in buying the rival Northwestern Consolidated. In 1898 Dunwoody bought 75% of his company from the surviving Washburn brothers, preventing a takeover and making the company operators its owners for the first time.

== Other affiliations ==
Dunwoody was vice president of the Minneapolis Loan & Trust Co. (formally merged with Northwestern in 1934), and at various times president and chairman of the board of Northwestern National Bank (today known as Wells Fargo). He was an organizer of the Minneapolis chamber of commerce and president of the Minneapolis Society of Fine Arts. He was president of the St. Anthony & Dakota, vice president of the Duluth and the St. Anthony Elevator companies, and president of the Barnum Grain Company. He was a director of the Great Northern Railway.

== Death ==
Dunwoody was ill for six months, reportedly from a heart ailment, and died at his home (104 Groveland Terrace, Minneapolis) on February 8, 1914. Kate Dunwoody died the following year. They are buried in Lakewood Cemetery.

== Legacy ==
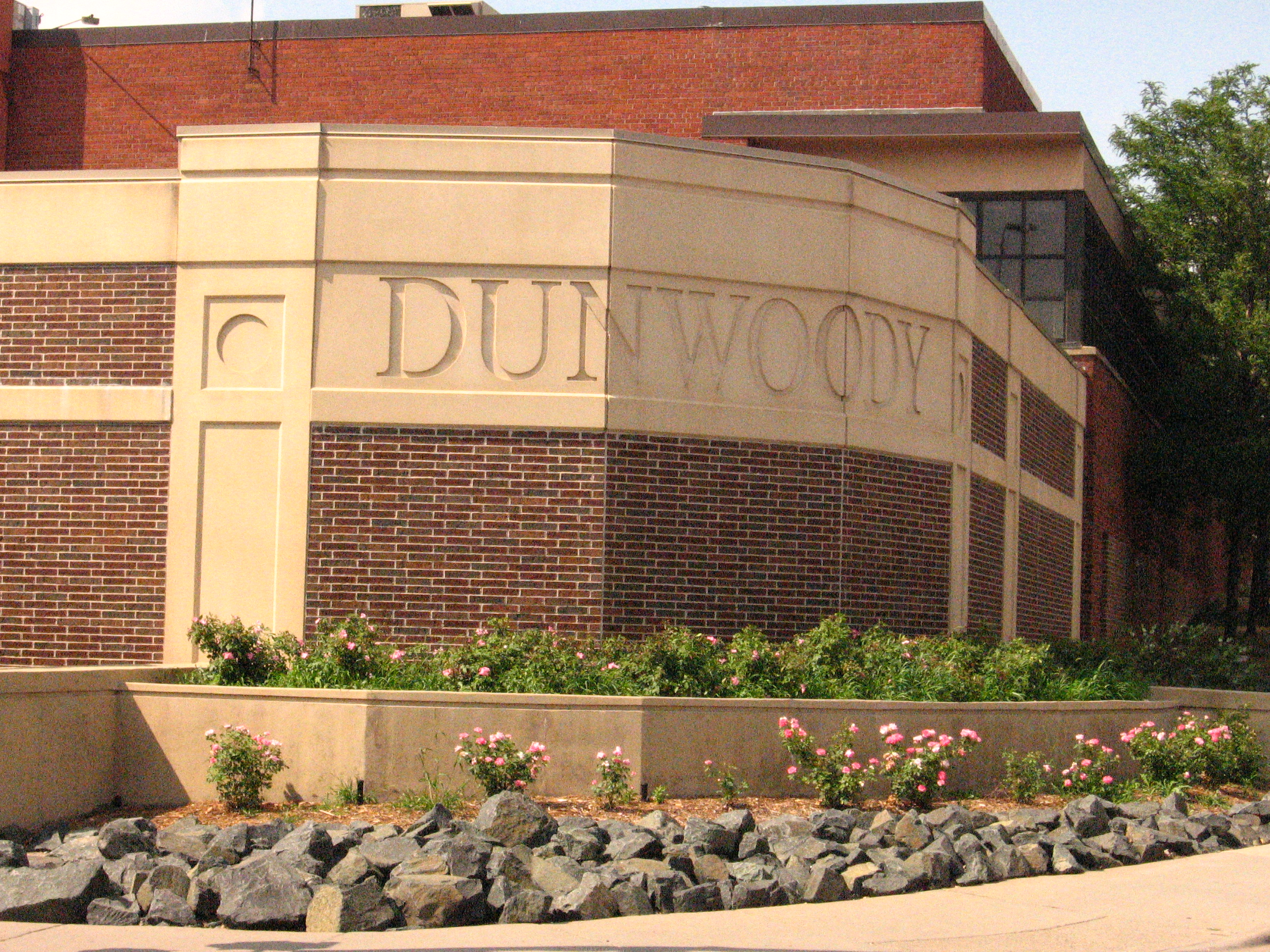
Dunwoody College of Technology, endowed in 1914 and 1915 by Dunwoody and his wife Kate, celebrated its centennial in 2015.

Of a total of $4.6 million in gifts in his will, Dunwoody gave $2 million to build an industrial trade school for young people, with a focus on handicrafts, useful arts, the milling arts, and construction of milling machinery. He felt the milling business was threatened by young people's tendency to enter the "office end" of the business after they graduated from high school. Kate Dunwoody gave an additional $1.6 million on her death in 1915. In 1998 the institute was accredited by The Higher Learning Commission to award bachelor's degrees. Today known as Dunwoody College of Technology, it occupies a campus near downtown Minneapolis. As of 2015 Dunwoody offers workforce training and continuing education, and programs in applied management, automotive, computer technology, construction sciences and building technology, design and graphics technology, engineering, radiologic technology, and robotics and manufacturing.

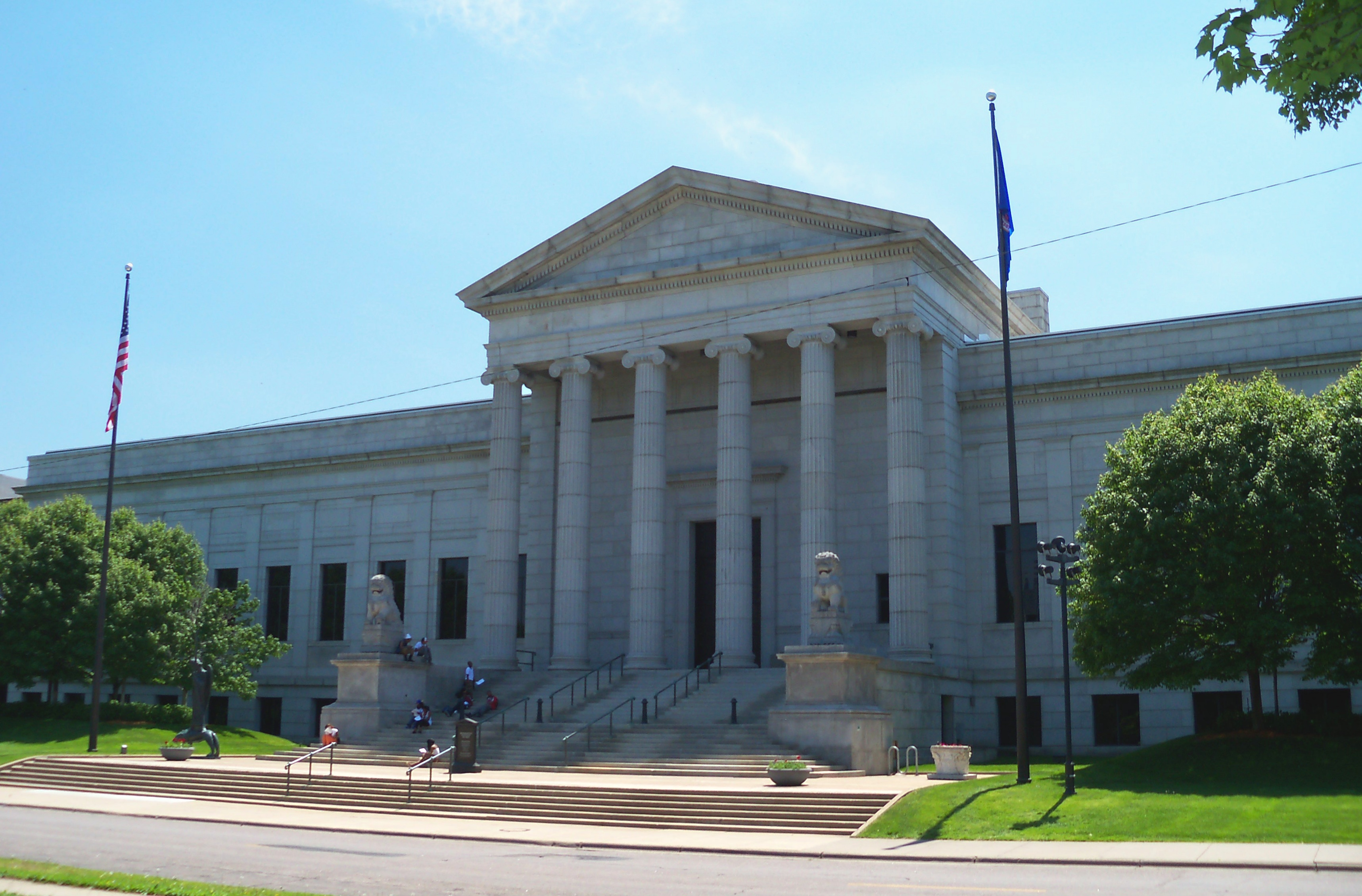
Dunwoody was one of the first donors for the Minneapolis Institute of Art building designed by McKim, Mead & White.

The William Hood Dunwoody Care Center in Newtown Square, Pennsylvania, earned 5 of 5 stars as one of the nation's best nursing homes according to U.S. News & World Report in 2015. Dunwoody left $1 million in his will to build a retirement village in his birthplace.

Dunwoody started Abbott Hospital for Dr. Amos Abbott, who had operated successfully on Kate Dunwoody. The hospital was owned until 1963 by Westminster Presbyterian Church; it merged with Northwestern Hospital to become Abbott Northwestern Hospital and later became part of Allina Health.

The Minneapolis Institute of Art purchased Lucretia (1666) by Rembrandt van Rijn, considered one of the finest Rembrandts in America, with $1 million from the William Hood Dunwoody Fund. Among thousands of other works, it also bought Olive Trees (1889), part of the final series by Vincent van Gogh. At her death in 1915, Kate Dunwoody gave the institute their personal collection. It included two major works by Constant Troyon, a small work by Jean-Baptiste-Camille Corot, a George Inness and work by Thomas Cole.

=== Gallery ===
Some of the thousands of works from the Minneapolis Institute of Art purchased with The William Hood Dunwoody Fund:

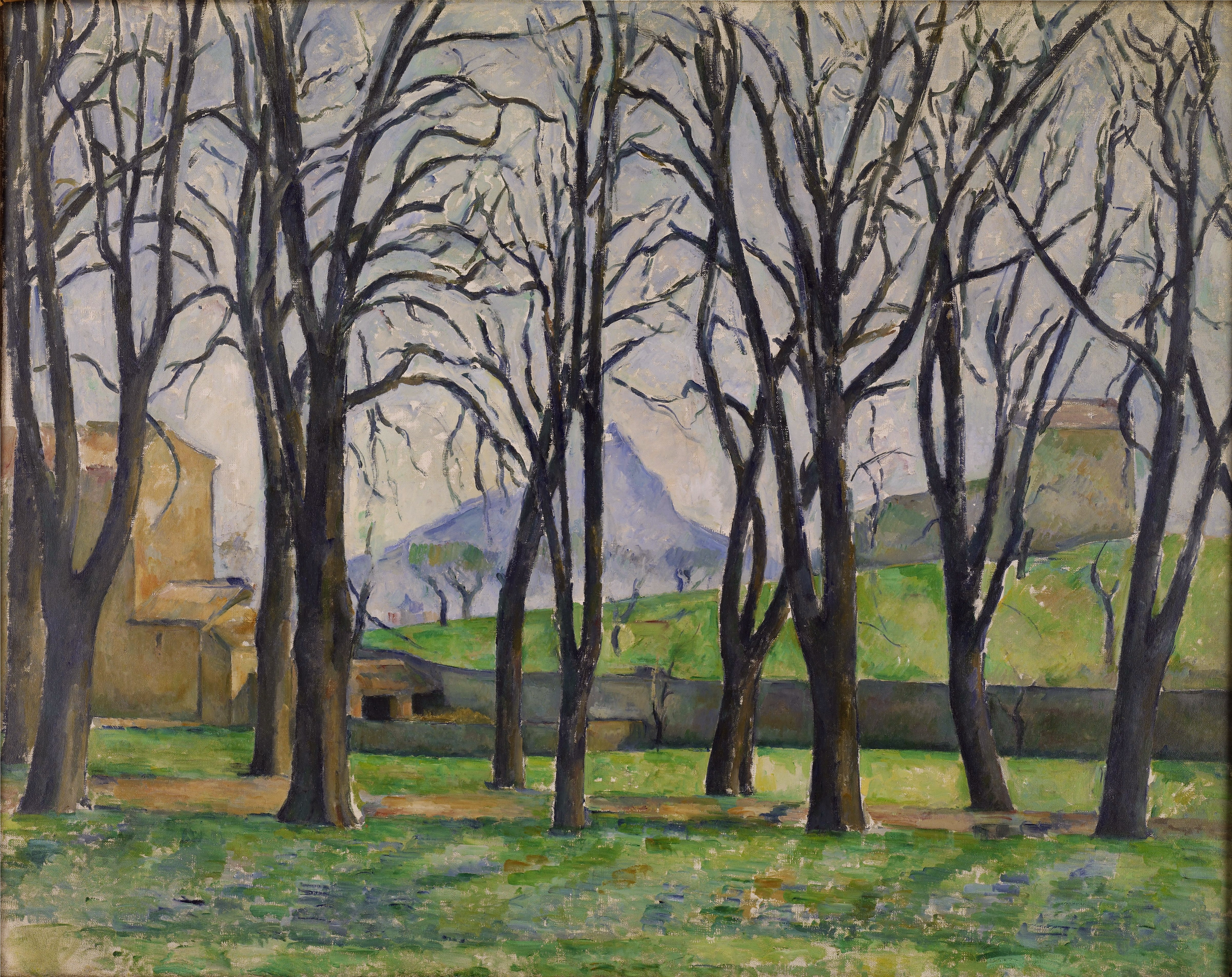
Chestnut Trees at Jas de Bouffan by Paul Cézanne (1885-1886)

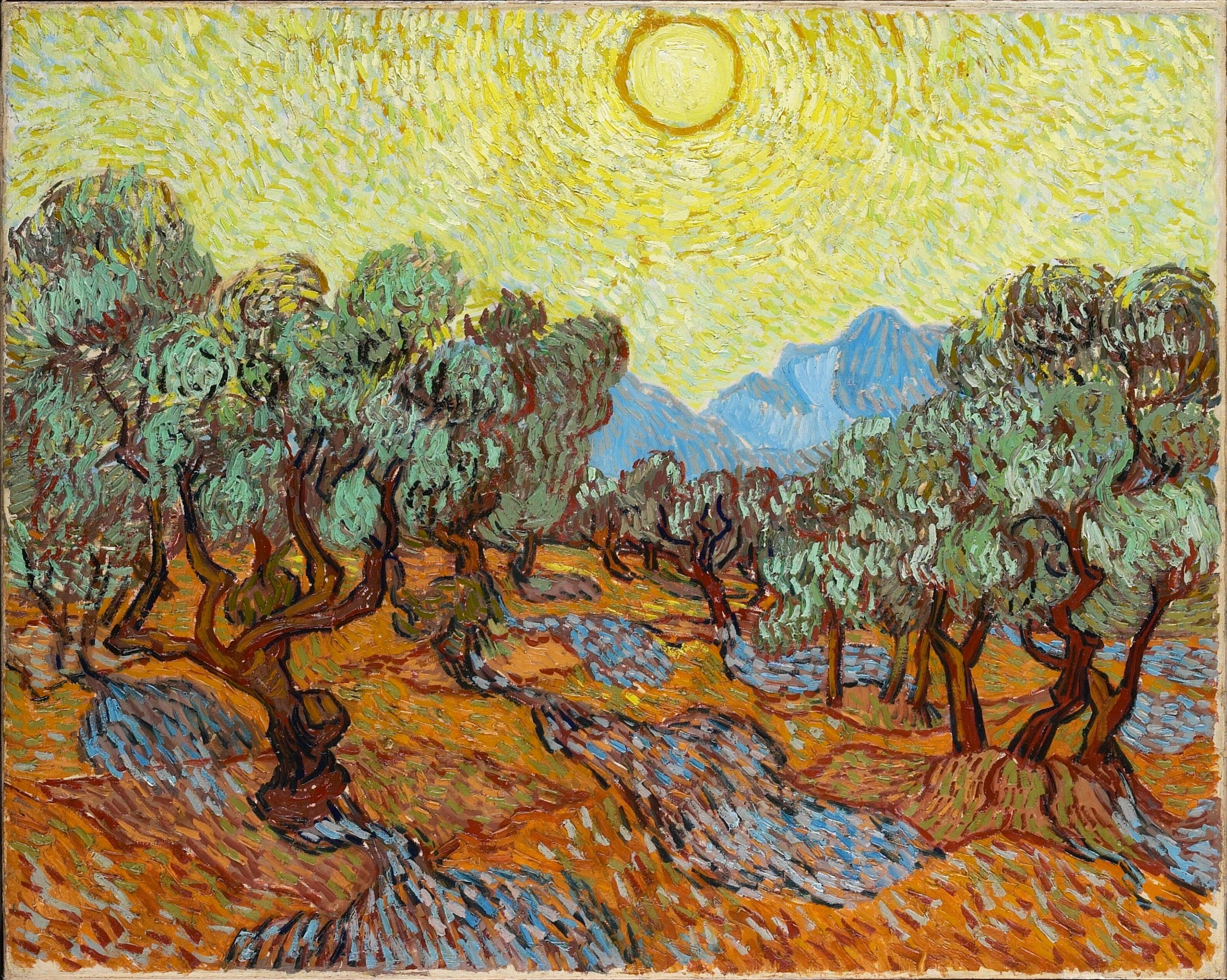
Olive Trees with yellow sky and sun by Vincent van Gogh (1889)

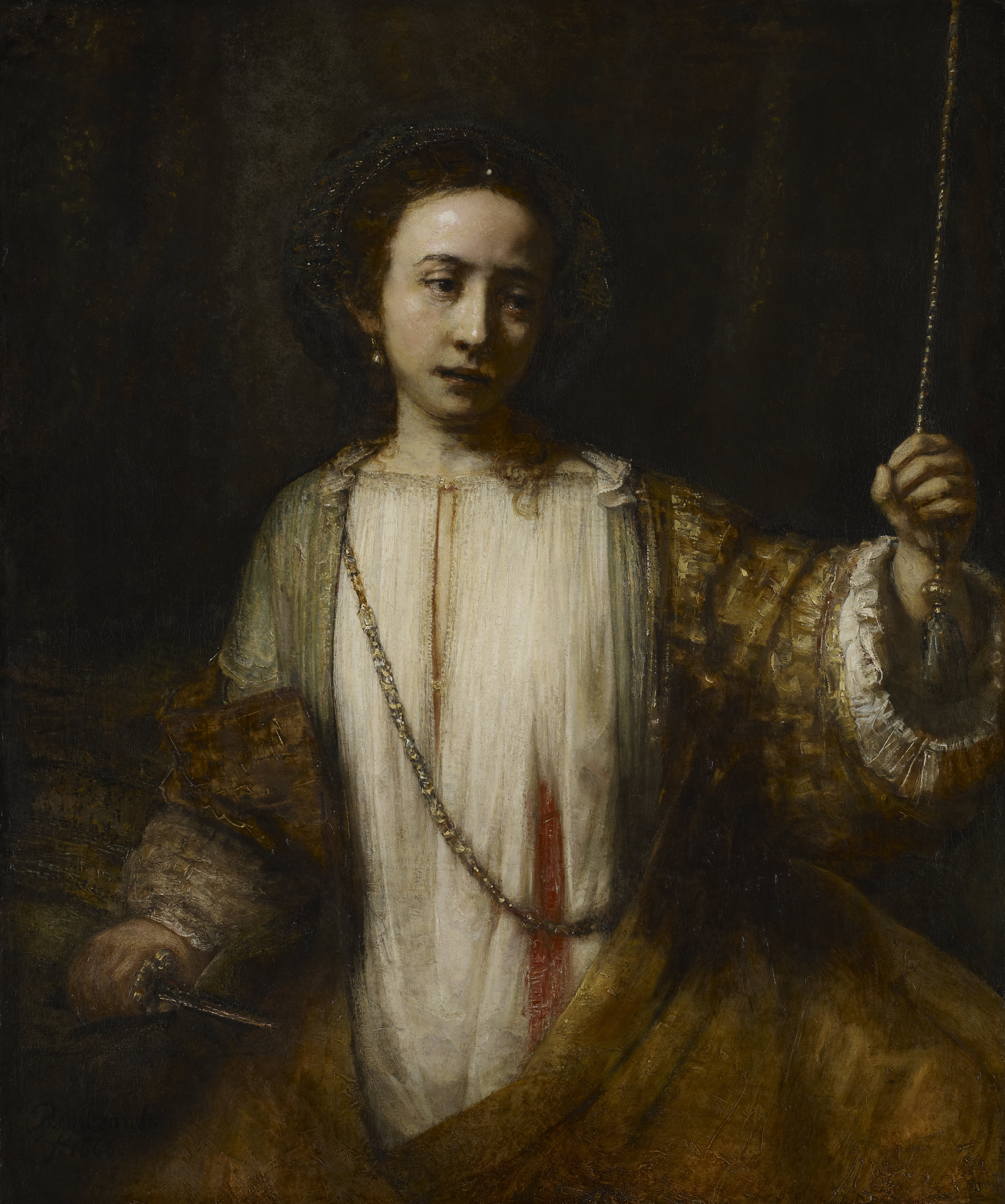
Lucretia by Rembrandt (1666)

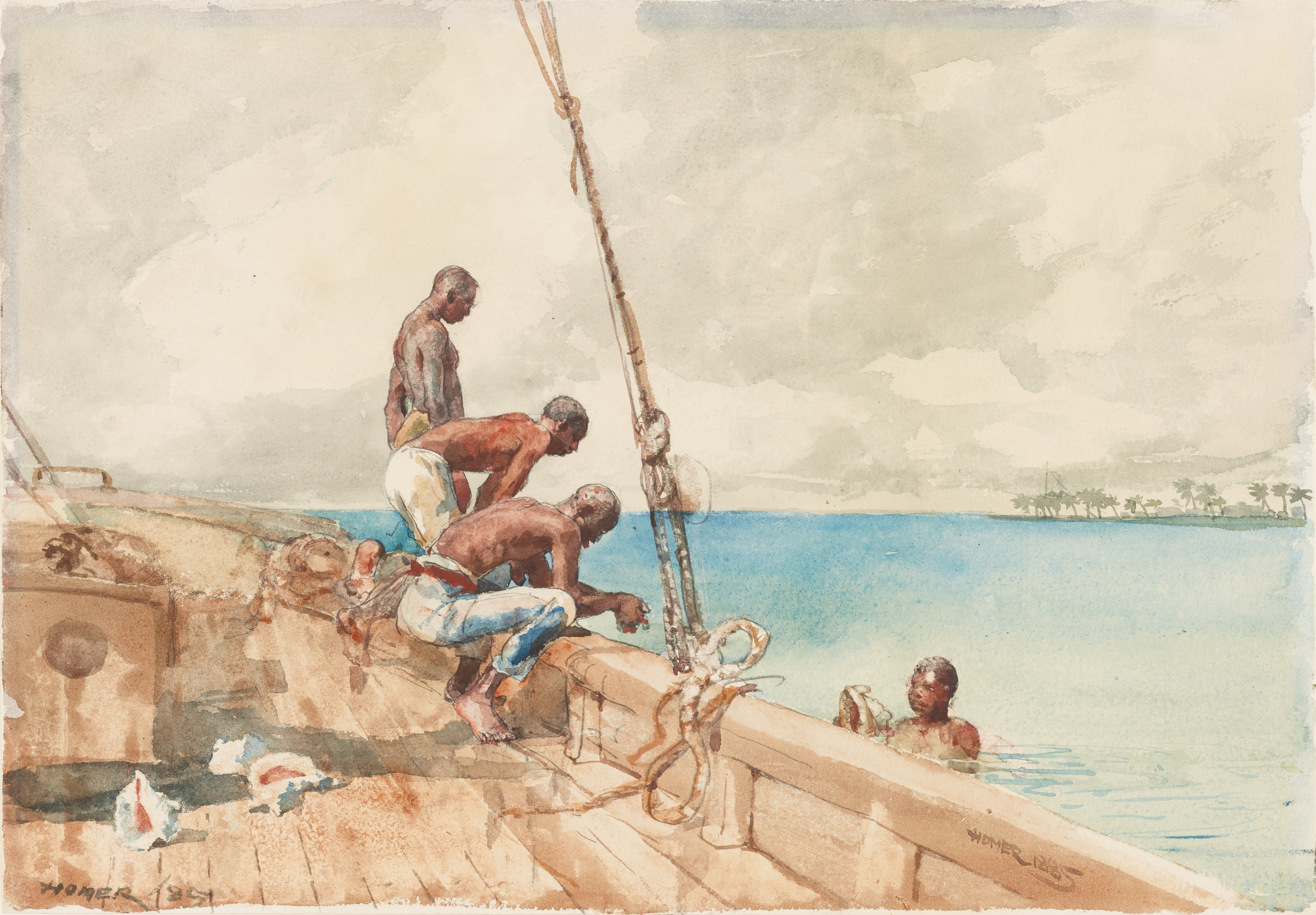
The Conch Divers by Winslow Homer (1885)

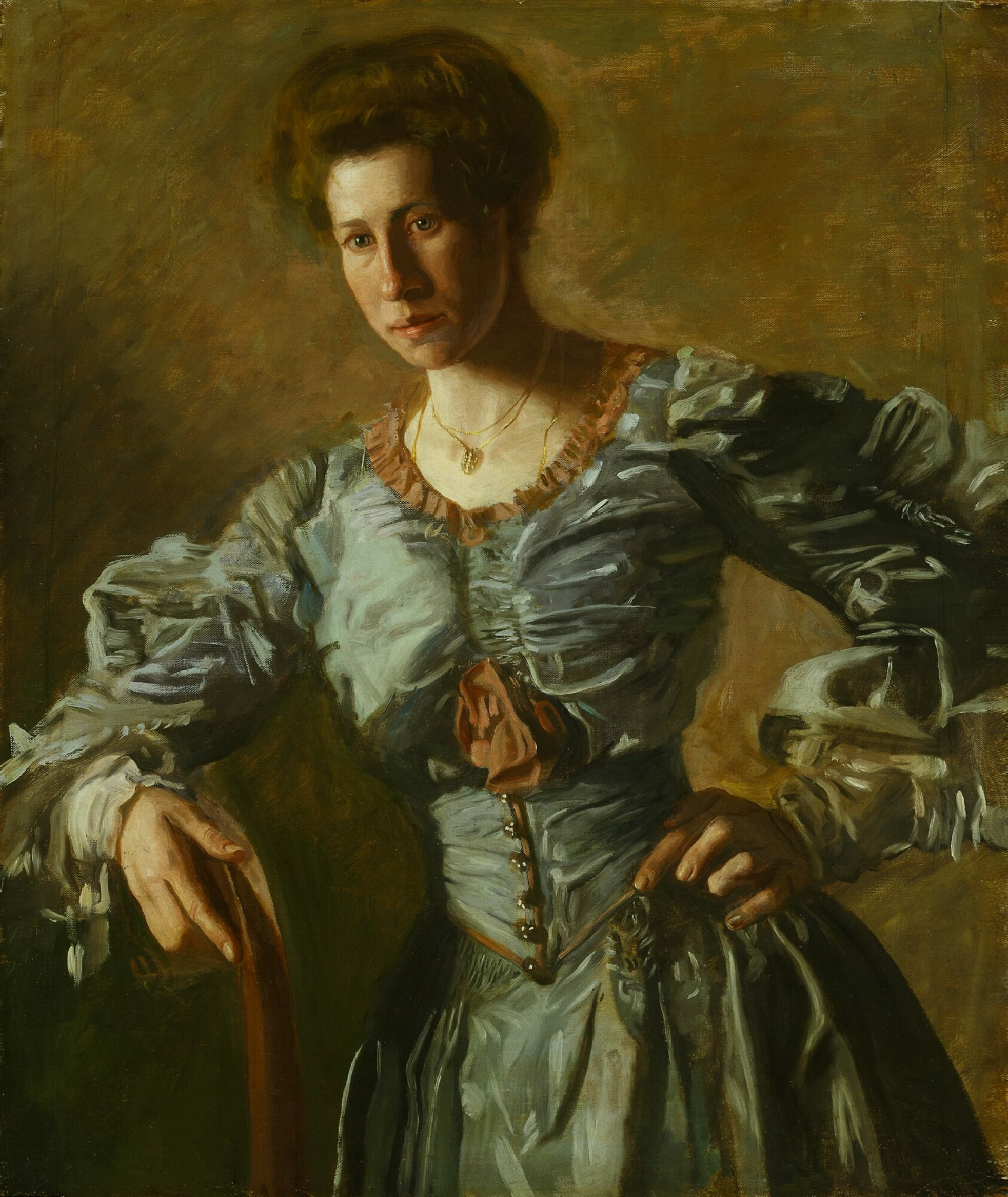
Portrait of Elizabeth L Burton by Thomas Eakins (circa 1905–06)

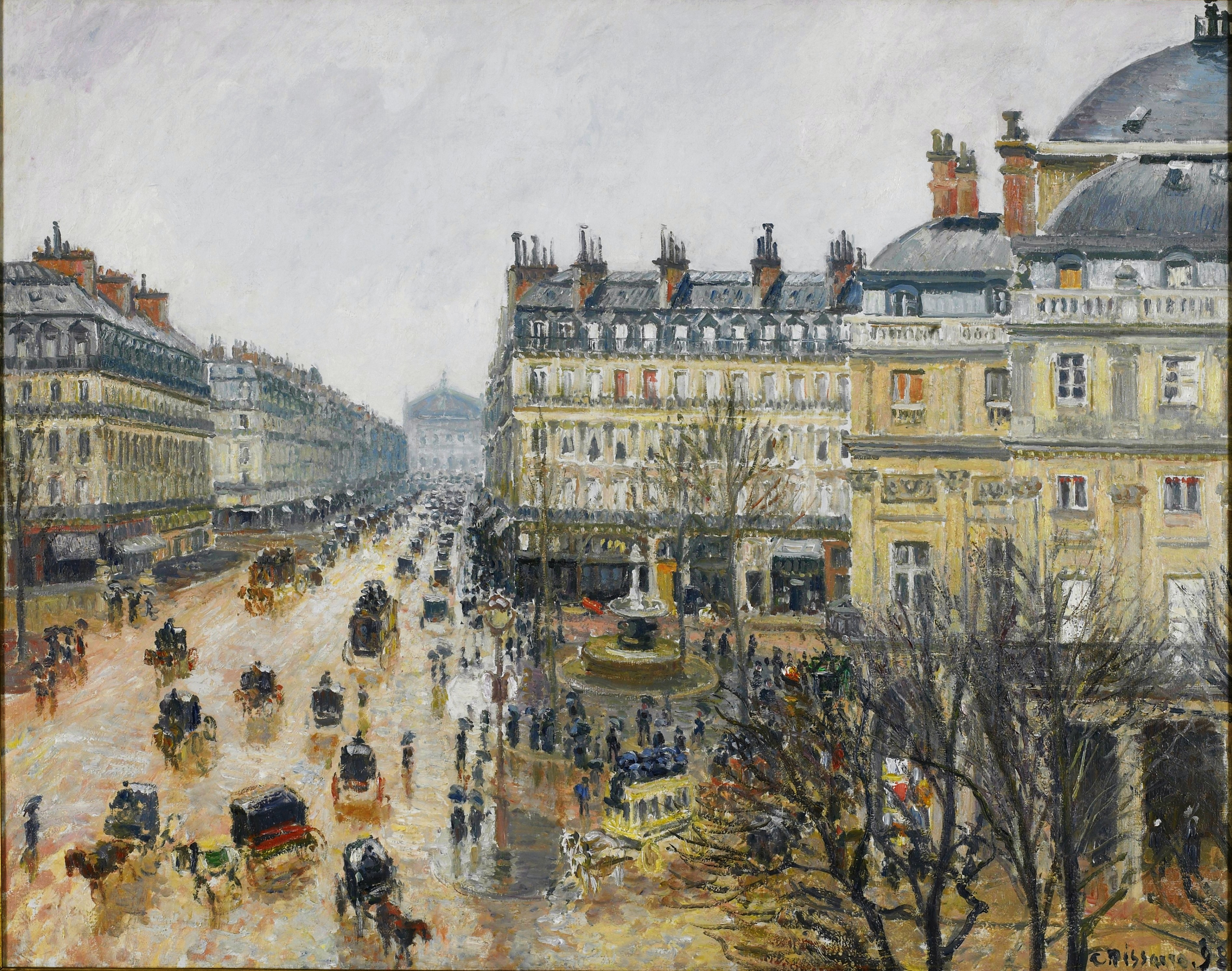
Place du Théâtre Français, Paris: Pluie by Camille Pissarro (1898)

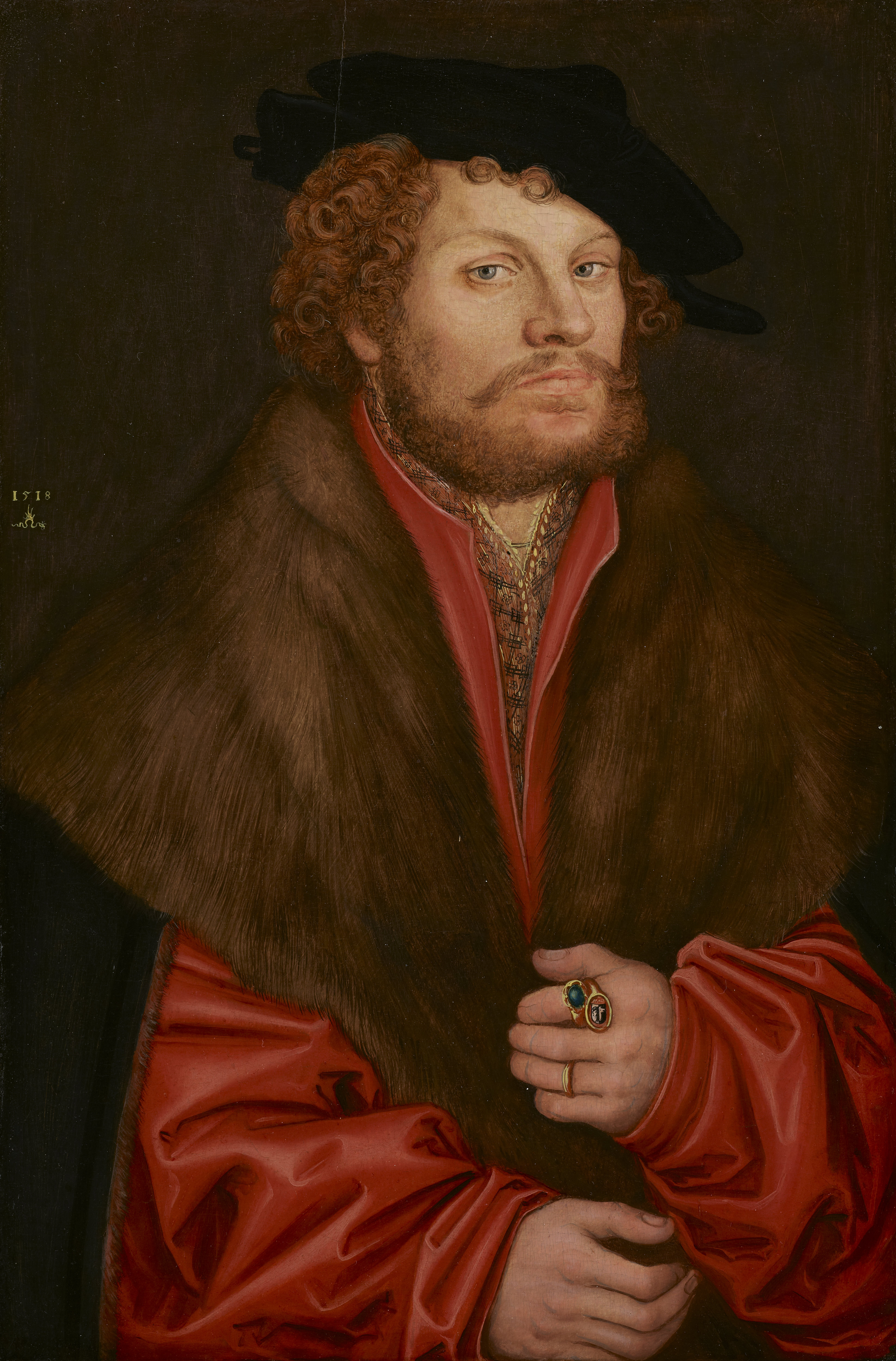
Portrait of Moritz Büchner by Lucas Cranach the Elder (circa 1520)

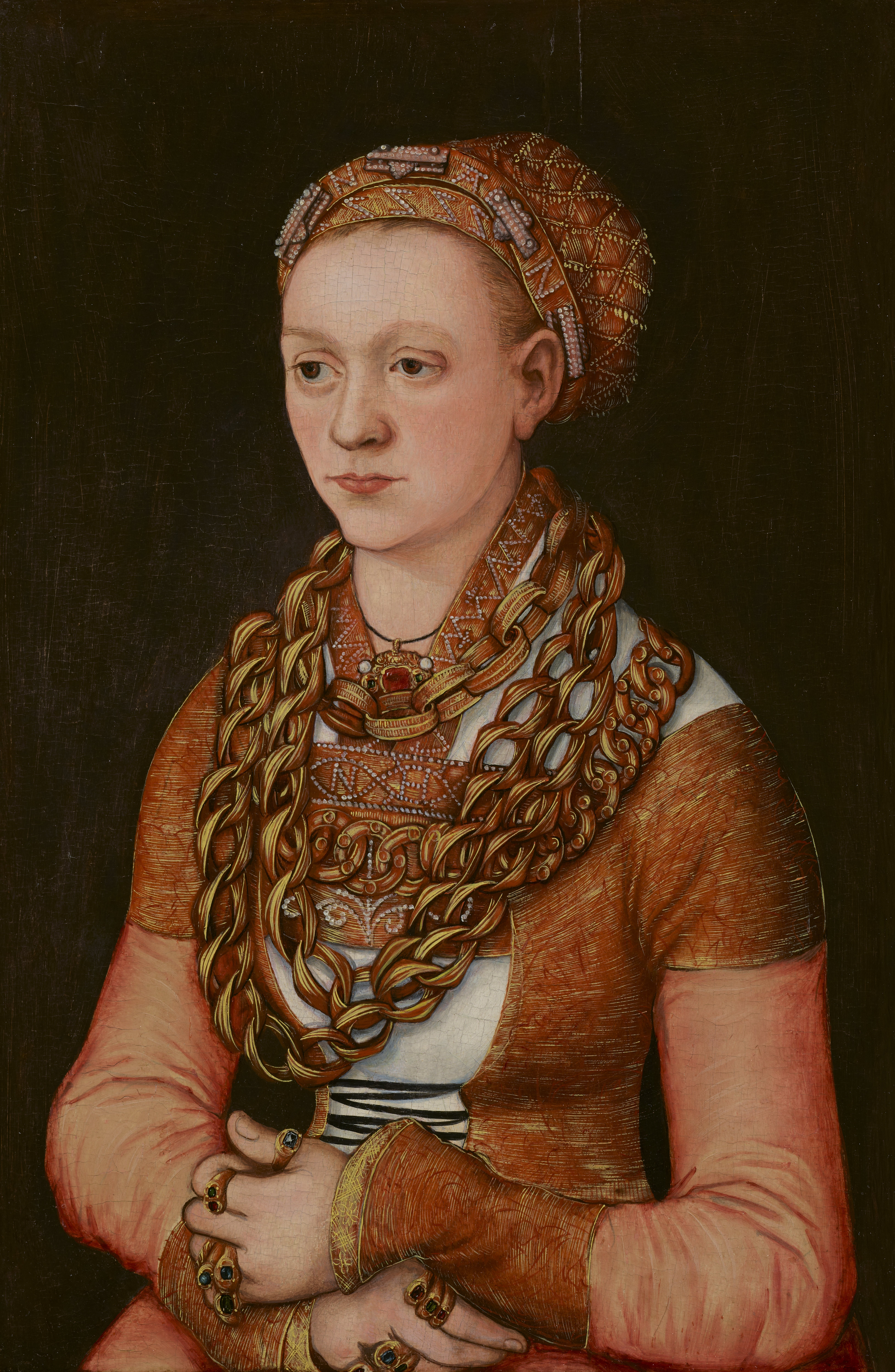
Portrait of Anna Buchner, née Lindacker by Lucas Cranach the Elder (circa 1520)

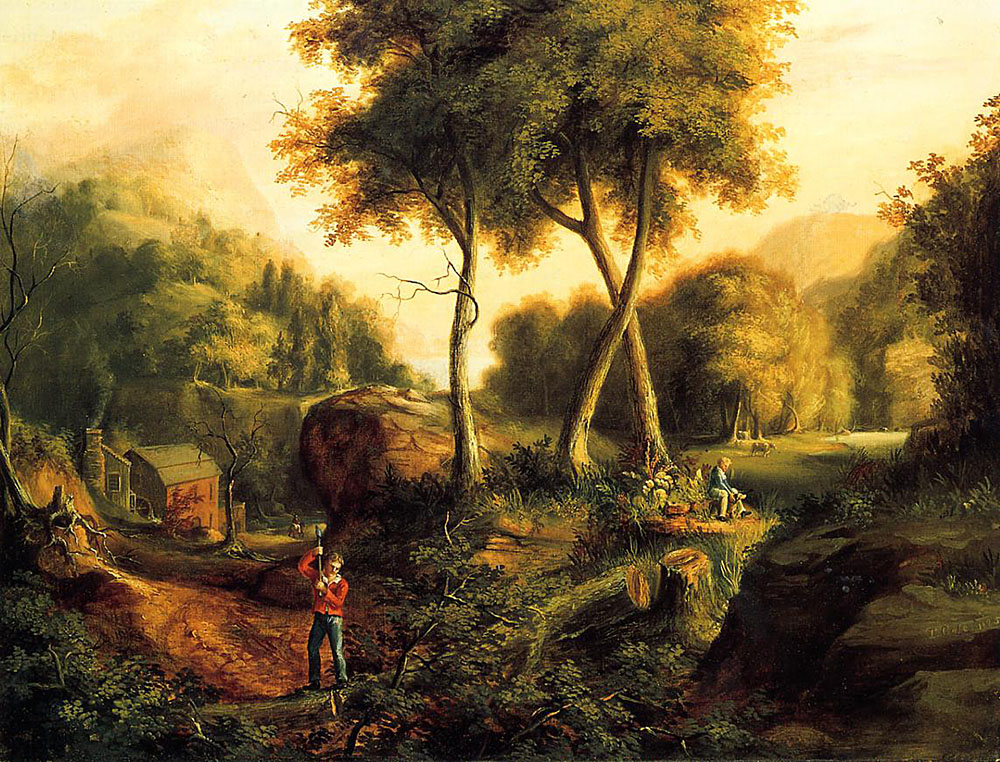
Landscape by Thomas Cole (1825). Bequest of Mrs. Kate L. Dunwoody.

== Bibliography ==
- Gray, James (1954). Business without Boundary: The Story of General Mills. University of Minnesota Press. LCCN 54-10286.
