= NEI College of Technology =

Coordinates: 45°2′35″N 93°14′59″W

NEI College of Technology was a technical college in Minneapolis, Minnesota, United States, specializing in electronics, and computer and information technology. It was founded in 1930 by George W. Young (founder of WDGY radio) as a school for radio repair. In 1967 it was renamed the Northwestern Electronics Institute. At that time it was located at 3800 South Minnehaha Avenue in Minneapolis. In 1982 it moved to its location to Columbia Heights, the former Columbia Heights High School, and was renamed NEI College of Technology. NEI is an abbreviation for Northwestern Electronics Institute.

It merged with Dunwoody Institute in Minneapolis to form the Dunwoody College of Technology in June 2003, at which point it moved all operations to the Dunwoody campus. The time of the merger, NEI had 500 students and Dunwoody had 1200 full-time and 2700 part-time students. The former campus, which consisted of one building, was purchased by the city of Columbia Heights in February 2004 and demolished in November 2004.

An "NEI Center" was established initially at Dunwoody to house the former NEI programs, but the two institutions have fully merged. Dunwoody maintains alumni connections for NEI, including annual gatherings.
