= Abbott Hospital =

- U.S. National Register of Historic Places
- U.S. Historic district – Contributing property
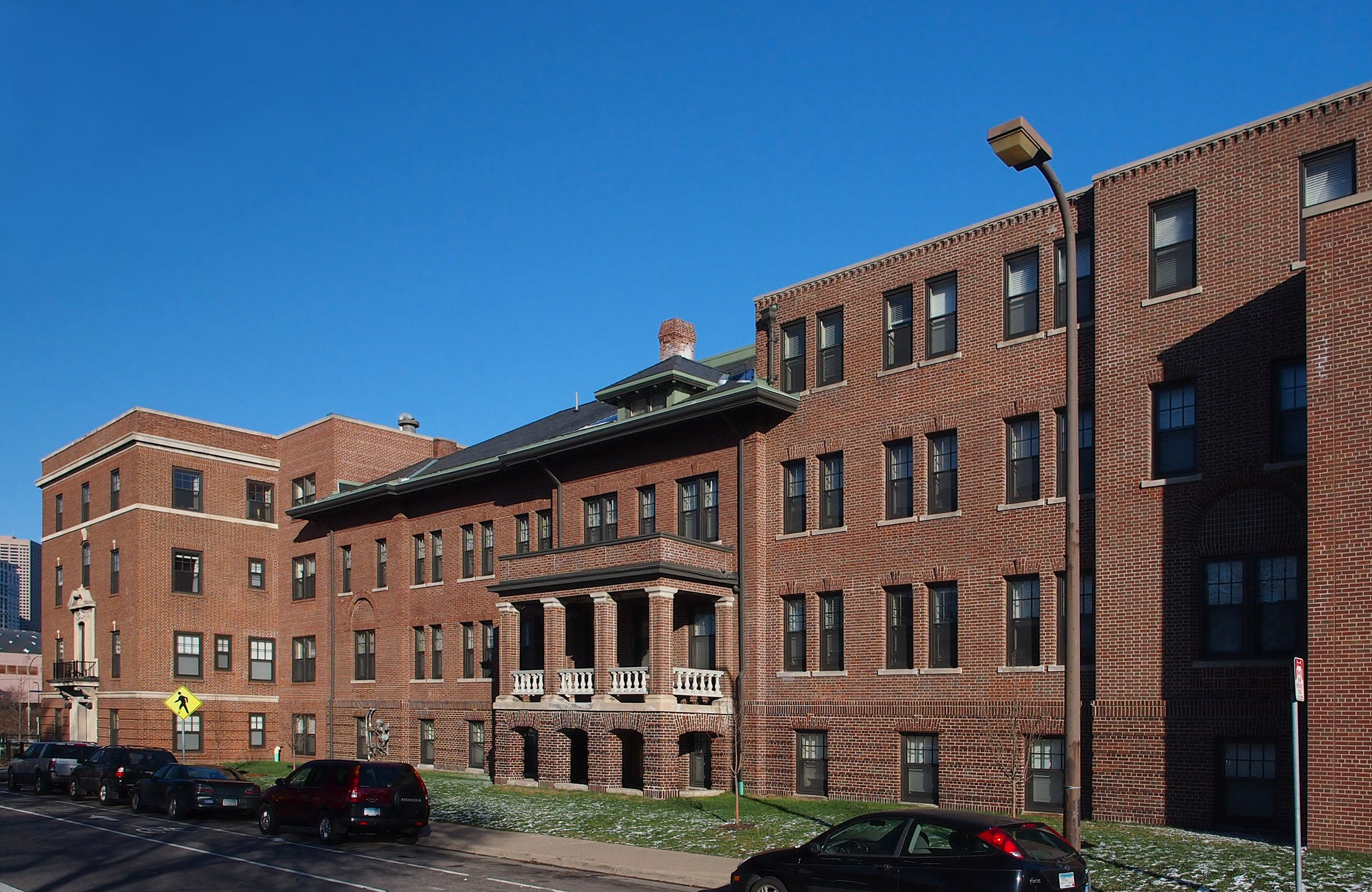
- Three sections of the building from left to right: Janney Children's Pavilion, the Dunwoody Building, and the Wyman Building.
- Interactive map of Abbott Hospital
- Location: 110 East 18th Street, Minneapolis, Minnesota
- Coordinates: 44°57′56″N 93°16′34″W
- Area: 1.6 acres (0.65 ha)
- Built: 1912
- Architect: William Channing Whitney, Kenyon and Maine; Magney, Tusler and Setter
- Architectural style: Late 19th And 20th Century Revivals, Classical Revival, Modern Movement
- Part of: Stevens Square Historic District (ID93000594)
- NRHP reference No.: 11000323
- Added to NRHP: June 1, 2011

Abbott Hospital is a former hospital building in the Stevens Square neighborhood of Minneapolis, Minnesota, United States. The hospital was originally built in 1910, with several additions up until 1958. The hospital eventually merged with Northwestern Hospital in 1970 to form Abbott Northwestern Hospital, and the Abbott Hospital building closed in 1980.

While the Abbott Hospital building is a contributing property to the Stevens Square Historic District, a separate listing was desired for the hospital because of its significance within the development of the health care system in Minneapolis. For that reason, a separate nomination was prepared and submitted, and the hospital was listed on the National Register of Historic Places on June 1, 2011.

== Founding ==
Dr. Amos W. Abbott was born in 1844 in India, the son of missionary parents from New Hampshire. He moved to Minneapolis in 1877, where his sister lived. He maintained a private practice, and in 1887, he started renting houses where he could treat patients. He was never able to treat more than eight patients at a time, though. He practiced at Saint Barnabas Hospital, Saint Mary's Hospital, and Northwestern Hospital, but never was able to provide boarding for those patients. In 1902, he founded Abbott's Hospital for Women in a large house in the Stevens Square neighborhood. In 1910, he was able to establish his own hospital building with the backing of William Dunwoody, a wealthy businessman. Dunwoody's wife Kate had been one of Abbott's patients.

== Construction history ==
The building was constructed in five sections, each of which reflects the health care practices of the times in which they were built.

=== Dunwoody ===
The original section of the hospital was named after William Hood Dunwoody. It was designed by architect William Channing Whitney and built in 1910. As originally built, the main entrance was a two-story brick and stone portico, with the doors on the porch on the second story. The main entrance was later relocated and the stairway was later removed.

The original building had only 30 beds, so Dr. Abbott was able to personally oversee all of the patients. His motto was, “Make the patients comfortable and make them feel at home.” There were no communal wards. Instead, patients had single- and double-occupancy rooms. The Minneapolis Journal commented on the hospital's “sun rooms, silent signal systems, spacious corridors, pleasing decorations and light and air in abundance.”

Dunwoody owned the building and the land. When he died in 1914, he left the hospital with a $100,000 endowment and transferred ownership of the property to Westminster Presbyterian Church.

=== Janney Children's Pavilion ===
The first addition to the structure was the Janney Children's Pavilion, named after Thomas B. Janney, who funded its construction. This addition was four stories in height and had a flat roof. It was built in 1919-1920 and designed by William Kenyon and Francis Maine. When this section was built, the main entrance of the hospital was relocated to a recessed doorway on the first story of the west facade. Unlike the Dunwoody building, the Janney addition had a flat roof and a more modern design, resembling the style, massing, and setback of the apartment buildings around Stevens Square.

The demand for pediatrics and obstetrics had been expanding. The pediatric unit had been located on the south side of the second floor of the Dunwoody building, but it often overflowed into other areas. At this time, there were four pediatricians working in the hospital: Dr. Julius Sedgwick, Dr. Nate Pearce, Dr. Rood Taylor, and Dr. Frederick C. Rodda. The Children's Pavilion was announced at a board of trustees' meeting in September 1919, when Janney provided a donation estimated between $200,000 and $330,000. Janney was another successful Minneapolis businessman. He was a founder of the hardware firm Janney, Semple, Hill and Company, and he also was president of Farmers and Mechanics Savings Bank and a director of Northwestern National Bank. When the addition was complete, the hospital had a capacity of 100 beds.

=== Wyman ===
The Wyman addition was an expansion built in 1938 and named after its major donor, Oliver C. Wyman. It was designed by Magney and Tusler, a prominent Minnesota architecture firm. Oliver C. Wyman was the president of Wyman, Partridge, and Company, as well as chairman of the board of directors at Northwestern National Bank and a vice president and trustee at Farmers and Mechanics Savings Bank. Through these connections, Janney and Wyman became friends, and Janney convinced Wyman to make a large donation in his will to Abbott Hospital. When he died in 1923, he left $500,000 to the trustees to be used at their “discretion for the erection of a General Hospital to stand connected with those created by his friends.”

The hospital had some financial difficulties in expanding, however. The previous administration of the hospital had not kept any set of business records, and no one at the hospital was skilled in business administration. In 1922, Westminster's Hospital Committee took notice, and decided to install a proper set of bookkeeping and administration at the hospital. They hired a business manager, and in 1925, they handed over management of the hospital to a committee of doctors and administrators. Dr. Abbott was named chief of staff in June 1925. He remained in this role for a short time before his death in February 1927, at the age of 83.

Because of the financial difficulties, the trustees were cautious about expansion. Victor Anderson, the business manager, had proposed a 200- to 250-bed facility in 1927, but the projected construction costs were higher than expected. A study of the potential use of the new space, presented in October 1930, revealed that Minneapolis had too many hospital beds after a construction boom in the 1920s. In 1936, the demand for hospital beds had become favorable enough to build a new wing to the hospital. Magney and Tusler reworked some earlier plans to meet the latest standards in hospital architecture, while retaining a harmonious appearance on the outside by using brick similar to the Dunwoody and Janney wings and by using similar size and massing to the nearby apartment buildings. The Wyman wing was completed in September 1938 and added sixty beds to the hospital. The first floor of the addition was devoted to administrative and staff functions, and also contained the kitchen and dining rooms for the entire hospital. The second and third floors housed patient rooms, and the fourth floor had four operating rooms, an X-ray lab, and other laboratories.

=== Janney Pavilion Addition ===
Magney and Tusler returned to design the Janney Pavilion Addition in 1954. The corridor between Dunwoody and the Janney Children's Pavilion was expanded, and an addition was completed on the south side of the Dunwoody building.

=== Stevens Addition ===
In 1957, the final hospital addition was completed. This was designed by Magney, Tusler and Setter, which had gained an additional partner. The section was built on the east end of the Wyman building and named for Stevens Avenue South, which borders the east side of the property.

== Later history ==
In 1964, the Westminster Presbyterian Church voted to transfer the ownership of the hospital to a new corporation, known as Abbott Hospital Incorporated. The church made this decision to prevent the church from loss of its assets or property in case of a disaster at the hospital.

In 1970, Abbott Hospital merged with Northwestern Hospital, but did not consolidate their facilities until 1980. The plan resulted from an analysis that the separate campuses needed improvements. By consolidating facilities, the combined corporation could gain greater operating efficiency. The construction costs were projected at $24 million, and other costs were projected at $14 million. The Abbott campus was too small to continue supporting its level of services effectively, and a fairly large expansion would have been necessary.

The Ebenezer Society agreed in 1978 to buy the main Abbott building and operate it as a nursing home, as well as providing other programs for the elderly. Those programs ceased in 2004 after which the building sat abandoned.

After a failed attempt to renovate the building into a condominium tower, work began in 2012 to renovate the original building into apartments. Now called the Historic Abbott Apartments, residents began moving in 2014.
