= Stevens Square, Minneapolis =

Stevens Square-Loring Heights
- Neighborhoods of Minneapolis
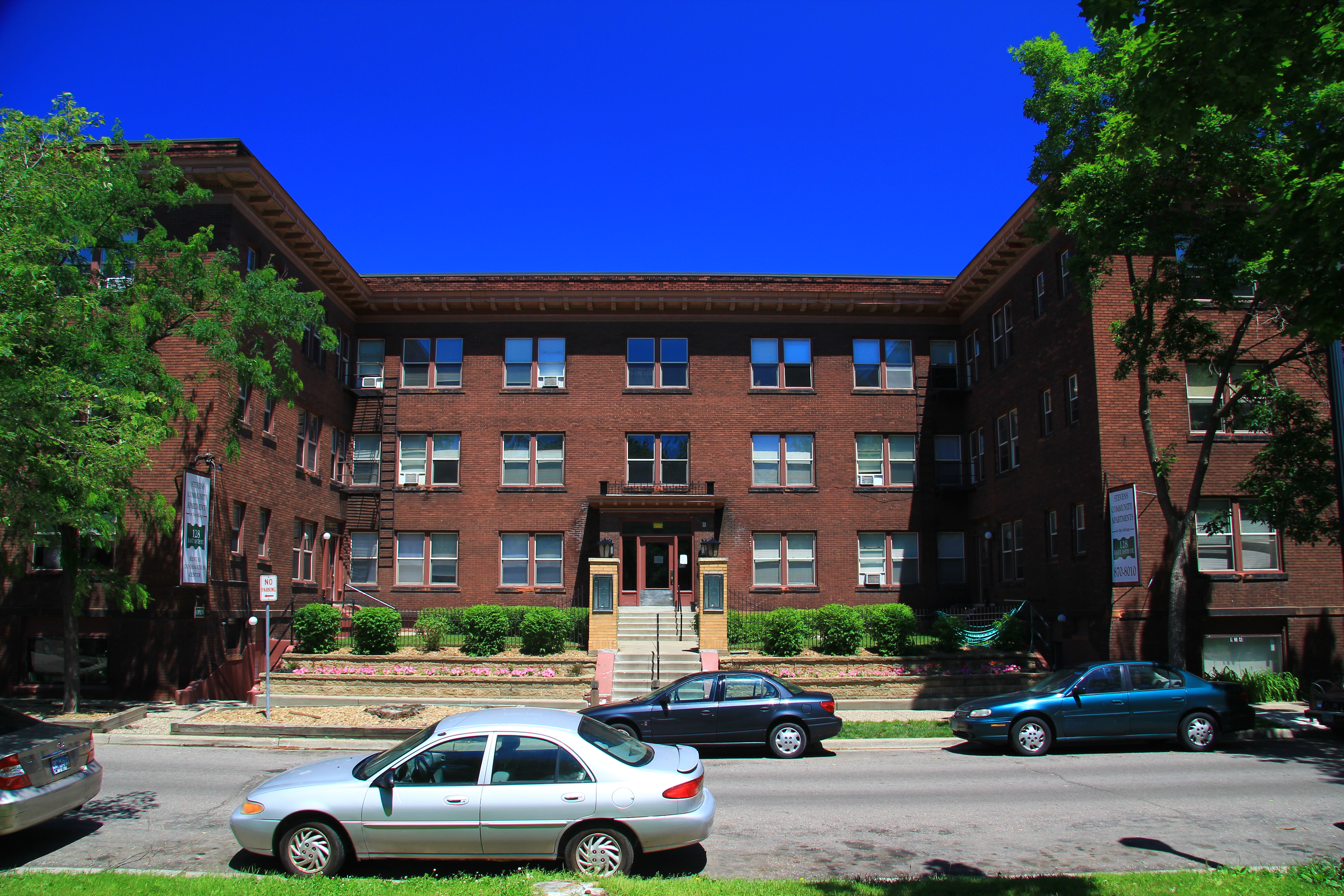
- Stevens Court, the oldest contributing building in the Stevens Square Historic District, built in 1913.

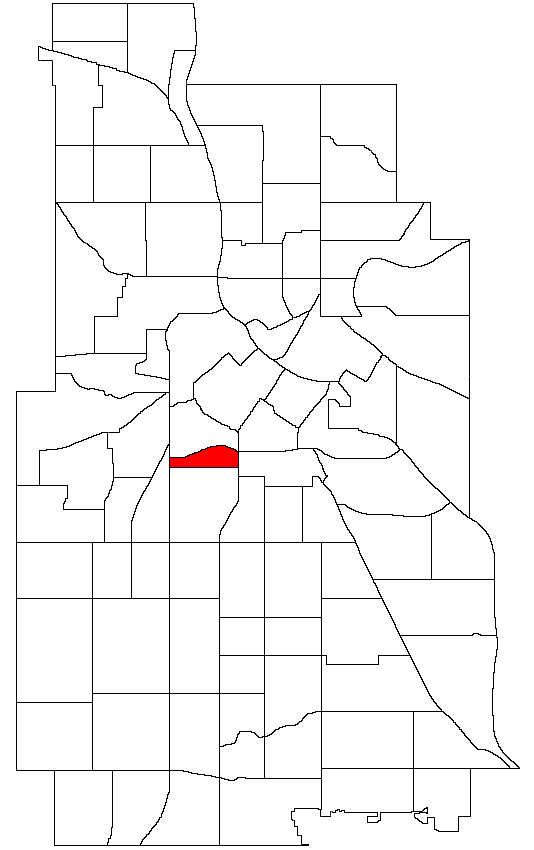
- Location of Stevens Square/Loring Heights within the U.S. city of Minneapolis
- Interactive map of Stevens Square-Loring Heights
- Coordinates: 44°57′53″N 93°16′29″W
- Country: United States
- State: Minnesota
- County: Hennepin
- City: Minneapolis
- Community: Central
- City Council Wards: 6, 7

Government
  - Council Member: Jamal Osman
  - Council Member: Elizabeth Shaffer

Area
  - Total: 0.187 sq mi (0.48 km^{2})
- Elevation: 863 ft (263 m)

Population (2020)
  - Total: 4,137
  - Density: 22,100/sq mi (8,540/km^{2})
- Time zone: UTC-6 (CST)
  - Summer (DST): UTC-5 (CDT)
- ZIP code: 55403, 55404, 55405
- Area code: 612

- Stevens Square Historic District
- U.S. National Register of Historic Places
- U.S. Historic district
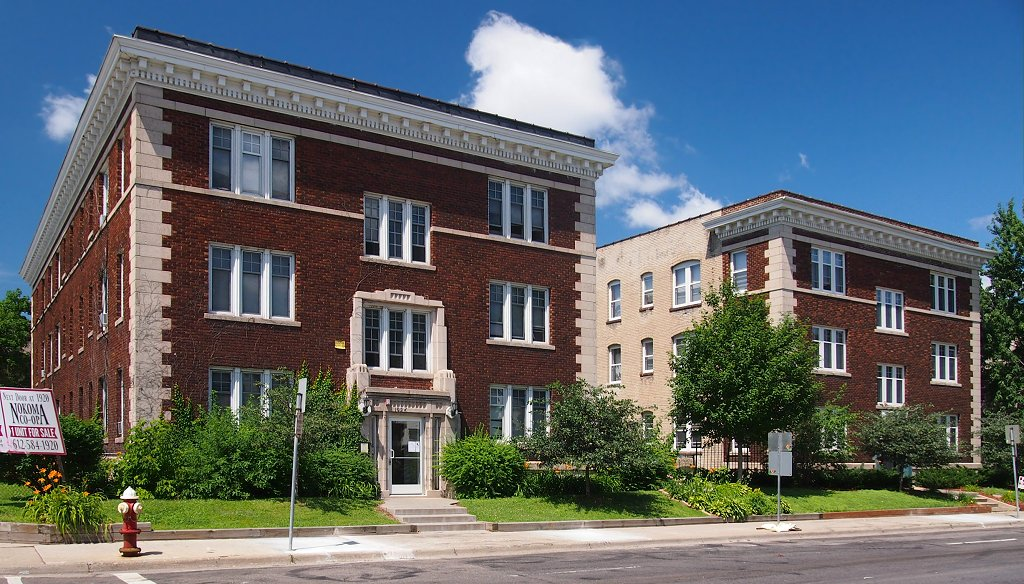
- Two 1915 apartment buildings typical of Stevens Square

- Location within Minnesota Location within the United States
- Location: Minneapolis, Minnesota
- Built: 1912
- Architect: Multiple
- Architectural style: Late 19th and 20th Century Revivals, Renaissance, Gothic Revival
- NRHP reference No.: 93000594
- Added to NRHP: July 1, 1993

Historical population
Census	Pop.	Note	%±
1980	3,827		—
1990	4,433		15.8%
2000	3,948		−10.9%
2010	3,833		−2.9%
2020	4,137		7.9%

Stevens Square (officially Stevens Square-Loring Heights) is the southernmost neighborhood of the Central community in Minneapolis. It is bordered on Lyndale Avenue on the west, Franklin Avenue on the south, and Interstates 94 and 35W on the north and east, respectively. The portion west of Nicollet Avenue can be referred to as Loring Heights; the portion to the East as Stevens Square.

Although it is the densest neighborhood in Minneapolis today, Stevens Square-Loring Heights was originally occupied by a few large mansions. Today, the area is composed mostly of old brownstone apartment buildings or mansions that have been subdivided into apartments, giving the neighborhood a heavy population density within its small geographical area; a short and wide neighborhood, it is nearly a mile long but only three blocks wide. Much of the neighborhood is a National Historic District, and five of the apartment buildings were listed on the National Register of Historic Places in 1993.

Although Stevens Square faced many of the same challenges which confronted other inner-city neighborhoods through the 1990s, the neighborhood has seen significant increases in safety and average income in recent years. These have been attributed both to a successful Neighborhood Revitalization Program and to limited gentrification, with many apartments buildings converted to condominiums or co-ops.

== History ==
Before the arrival of European settlers, the area was inhabited by Dakota Sioux. Although the area was platted in 1856, it remained sparsely occupied for several decades. Most land in the area was purchased by Richard Mendenhall, who developed the land into a small number of large houses and several massive greenhouses, which supplied Mendenhall's floral business. However, the neighborhood's central location and the rapid growth of the city in the 1890s, facilitated by the introduction of horse-drawn and then electric streetcars which passed through the area on several streets, made the area an increasingly attractive area for redevelopment.

In 1907, the property owners, along with one of the biggest property developers in town, petitioned the Park Board to purchase the site of Stevens Square Park, whose irregular grade made development impractical. The Park Board quickly accepted the offer, purchasing the site for $41,820, financed partly by an assessment on local landowners. The park was named in honor of Col. John H. Stevens, the first authorized settler on the west bank of what would eventually become Minneapolis. Construction on the Abbott Hospital, now converted to apartments, began in 1910. Apartment construction soon followed, largely in the Renaissance Revival style set by Stevens Court. Most buildings were constructed to the limits of fire codes at the time, maximizing land coverage and density while building to the three and a half story limits established for non-fire safe construction.

Most of the older buildings in the neighborhood were constructed by the mid-1920s, when a slump in the housing market combined with a lack of available land drastically slowed the pace of further construction. Although the neighborhood was originally inhabited primarily by middle-class office workers and single women, by the mid-century the rise of the automobile and white flight to the growing suburbs led to significant decline, as average incomes in the neighborhood dropped precipitously. Although spared from destruction by the construction of Interstate 35W, originally planned to pass directly through the center of the neighborhood, the two new Interstates isolated the neighborhood from downtown except by a few bridges on major arterials. Several large high-rise public housing projects were completed in the 1960s, which contributed to the reputation of the neighborhood as dangerous and low-income.

Starting in the 1970s, however, an active neighborhood organization and interested landowners began working actively to revitalize the neighborhood, renovating many buildings and addressing quality-of-life issues in the neighborhood. Much of that renovation was financed by General Mills, which believed there were significant profits to be made in revitalizing the inner city, although disappointing financial returns led the company to divest from the project in 1980. A successful block patrol program was set up, and in 1994 the Emily Peake Memorial Garden was established at the corner of Third Avenue and 19th St, in part to discourage what was then a favorite location for drug sales. In recent decades, crime has declined precipitously, although some quality-of-life problems persist.

In 1989, Stevens Square was locally designated a historical district, with national designation coming in 1993.

== Transportation ==
Several important arterial streets pass through the neighborhood, including Nicollet Avenue (Eat Street), First Avenue, and Franklin Avenue. In addition, the neighborhood has easy access to nearby Interstate highways, and to downtown Minneapolis, located less than a mile to the north.

In addition, the neighborhood is served by several important transit lines, including the high-frequency 18 bus on Nicollet, as well as the 2 (on Franklin Ave), the 11 (on 3rd Ave S), and the 17 (also on Nicollet Ave). Although the neighborhood was considered as part of the routing for the Metro Green Line Extension, an alternate route (bypassing the neighborhood) was chosen.

== Demographics ==
In the 2020 Census, 4,137 people lived in the Stevens Square-Loring Heights neighborhood. According to the 5-year American Community Survey (ACS) data for 2018-2022, 53.7% of residents were white, 18.7% were Black, and 18.3% were Hispanic or Latino. The neighborhood is majority renters. In the 2018-2022 ACS data, 62.5% of housing units were occupied by renters and 20.2% by owners. The average household size was 1.2 owners and 0.8 for renters.

The neighborhood is the densest in Minneapolis, with a population density of over 22,000 inhabitants per square mile (8,500/km^{2}). Stevens Square-Loring Heights was the densest neighborhood in Minneapolis at each of the 2000, 2010, and 2020 Censuses.

Race/ethnicity
Race/ethnicity	2000		2010		2020	
Race/ethnicity	Number	%	Number	%	Number	%
White alone	2,425	61.42	2,465	64.31	2,259	53.89
Black alone	673	17.05	821	21.42	1,016	24.24
Hispanic or Latino (any race)	456	11.55	221	5.77	338	8.06
Native American alone	72	1.82	46	1.20	76	1.81
Asian alone	111	2.81	131	3.42	191	4.56
Other race alone	12	0.30	8	0.21	29	0.69
Pacific Islander alone	4	0.10	1	0.03	4	0.10
Two or more races	195	4.94	140	3.65	279	6.66
Total	3,948	100.0	3,833	100.0	4,192	100.0

== Government ==
The half of the neighborhood east of Nicollet Avenue (Stevens Square) is part of City Council Ward 6, while the part to the west (Loring Heights) is in Ward 7. The whole neighborhood is represented in the Minnesota State House of Representatives in district 62A, in the Minnesota State Senate in district 62, and in the United States House of Representatives in Minnesota's 5th congressional district.

=== Representatives ===
- Minneapolis City Council, Ward 6: Jamal Osman
- Minneapolis City Council, Ward 7: Elizabeth Shaffer
- Minnesota State House of Representatives, District 62A: Aisha Gomez
- Minnesota State Senate, District 62: Omar Fateh
- US House of Representatives, 5th Congressional District: Ilhan Omar

== Landmarks and attractions ==
Several buildings within the neighborhood are listed on the National Register of Historic Places. These include the historic Amos B. Coe House on Third Avenue, which is home to the Minnesota African American History Museum and Cultural Center; the Abbott Hospital, now apartments, displays an architectural view of the progression of the medical industry, and the George W. and Nancy B. Van Dusen House, a Richardsonian Romanesque mansion now used as an event space.

The bells of the historic Plymouth Congregational Church, located in the center of the neighborhood, can be heard by a wide radius in the area. There are several restaurants and coffee shops in the neighborhood and four small corner grocery stores. The neighborhood is in walking distance of the many restaurants of Eat Street in Whittier, as well as those in Loring Park.

== Gallery ==
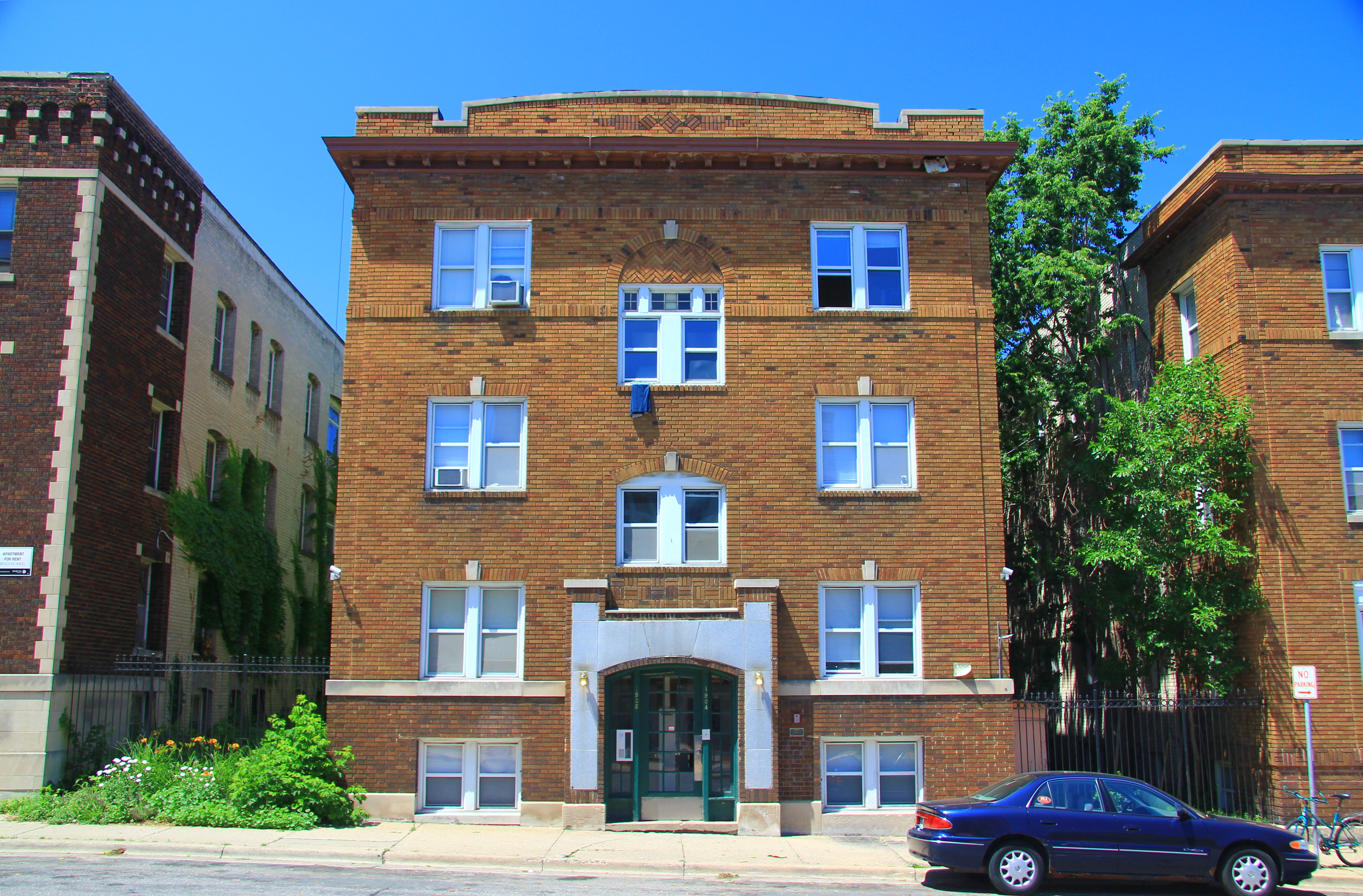

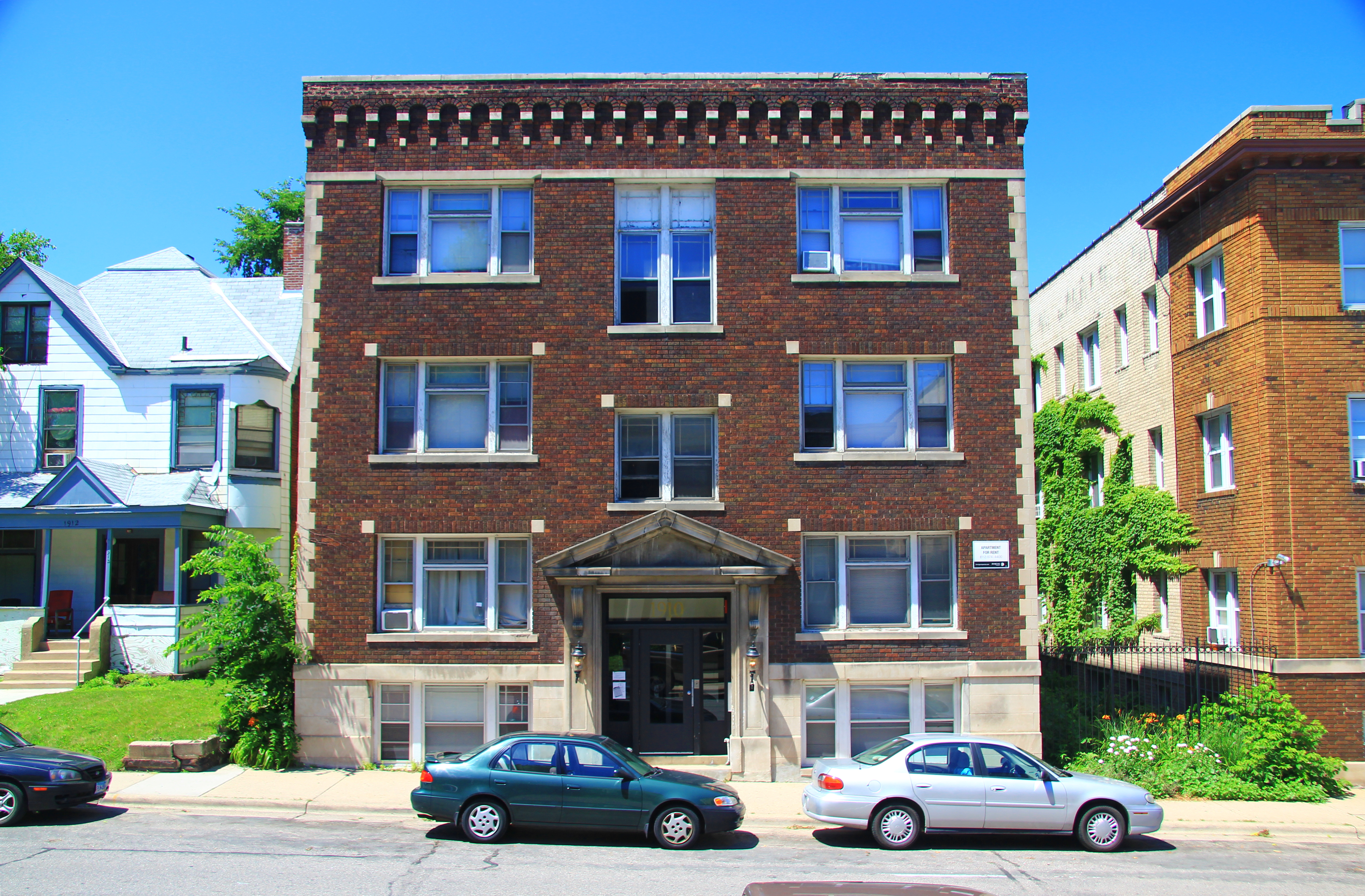

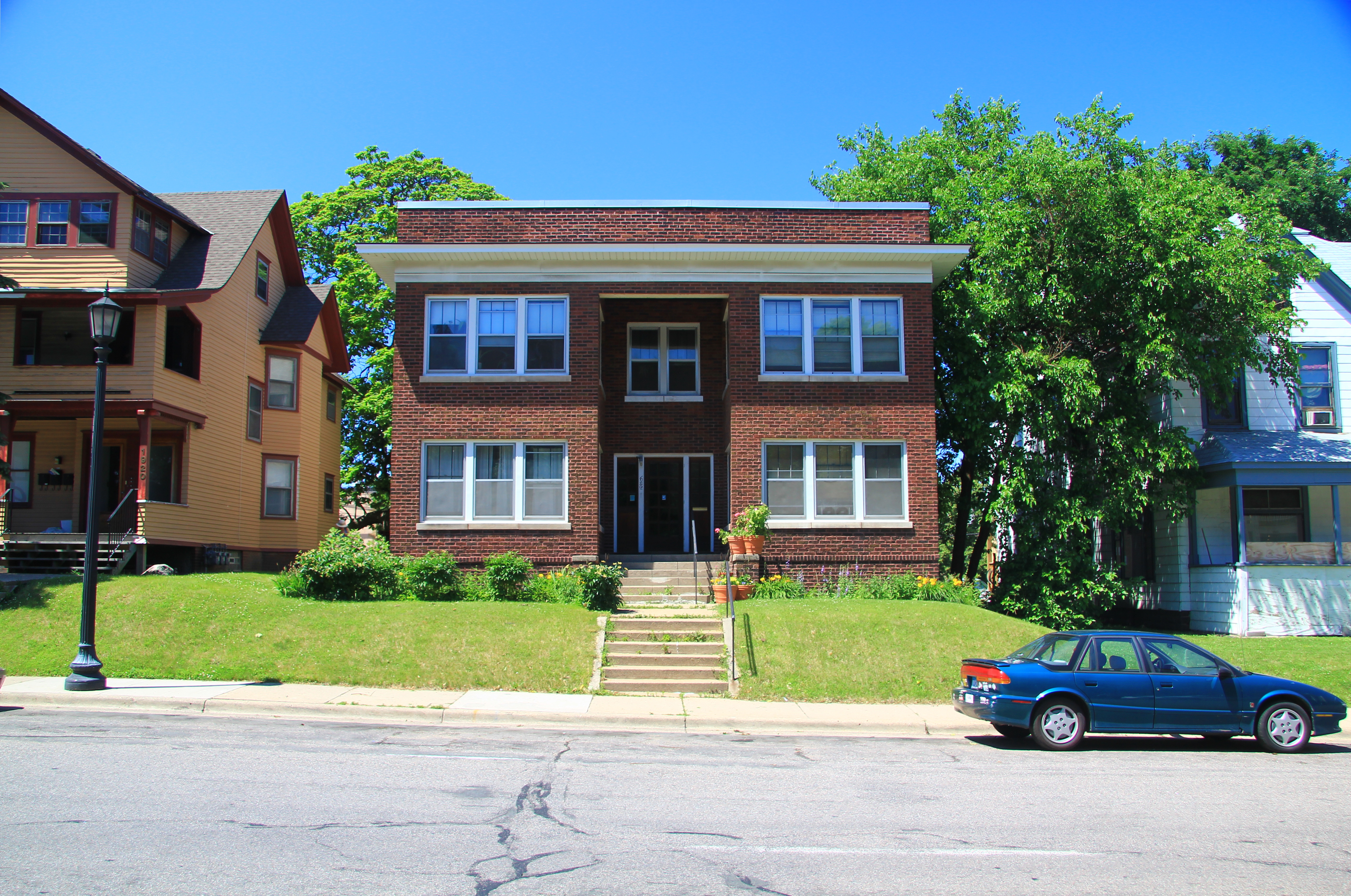

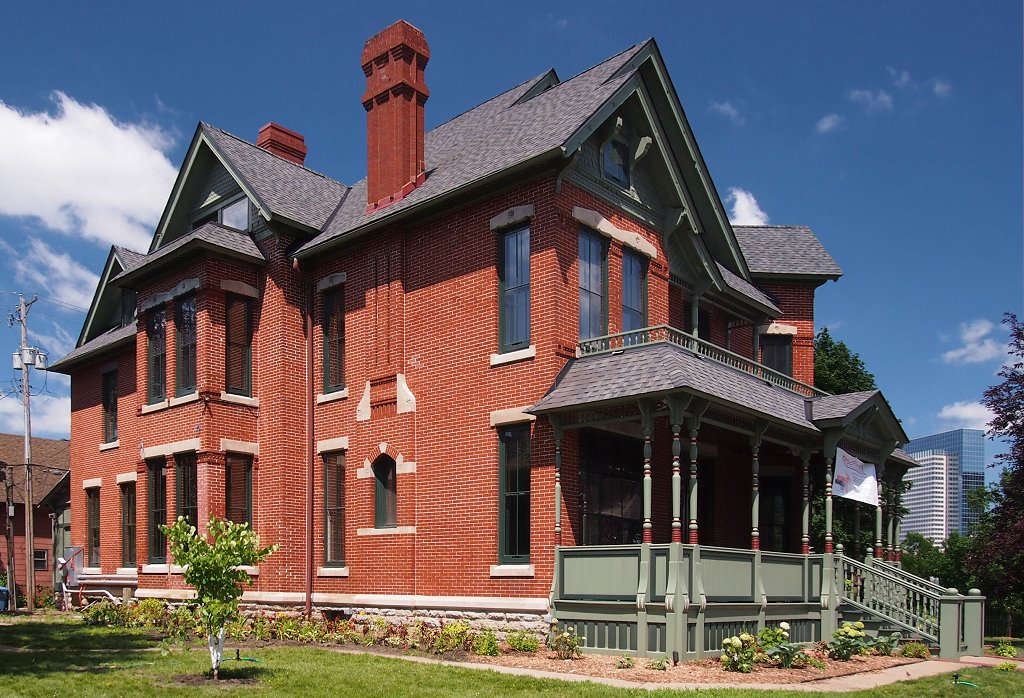

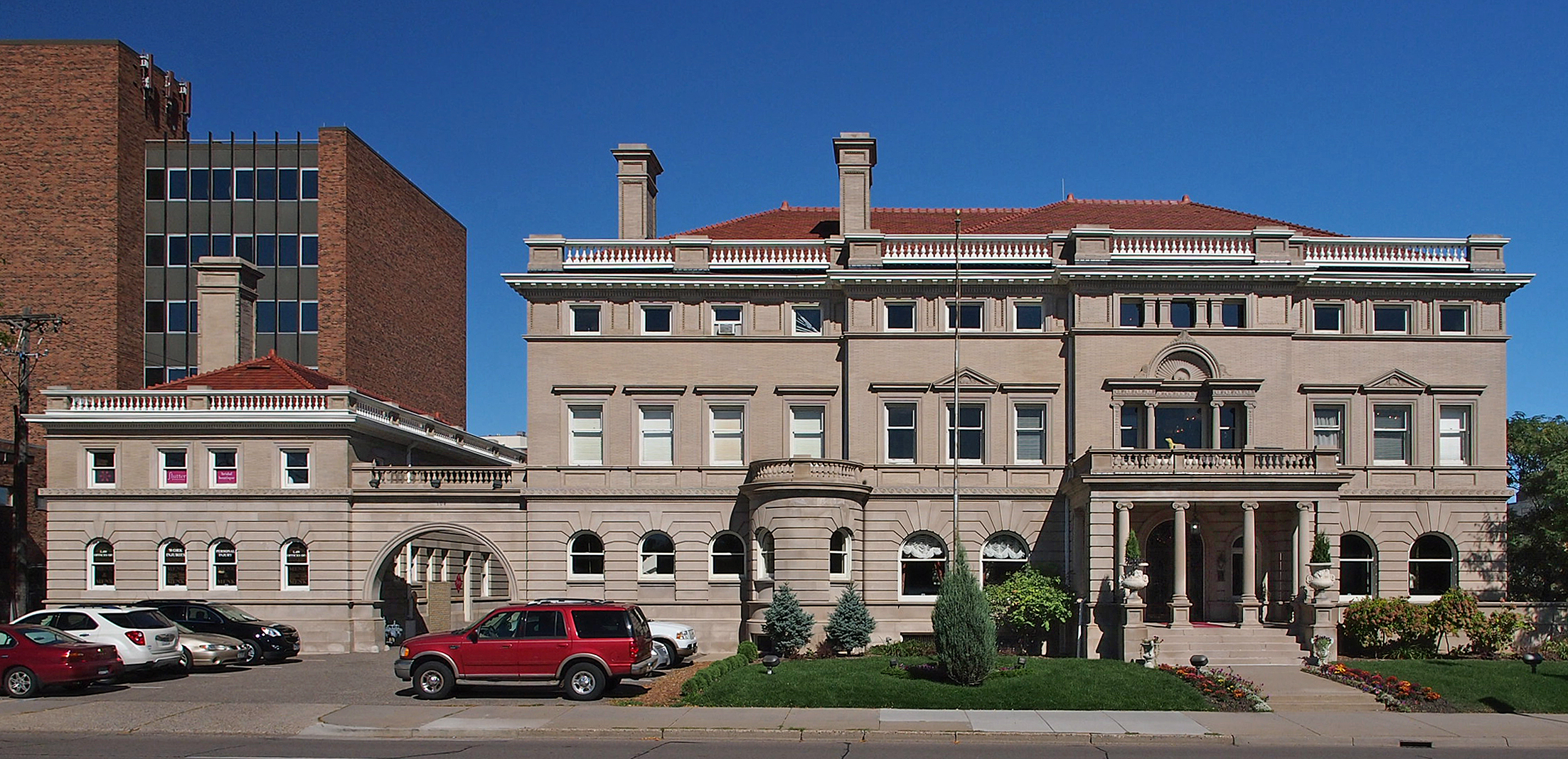

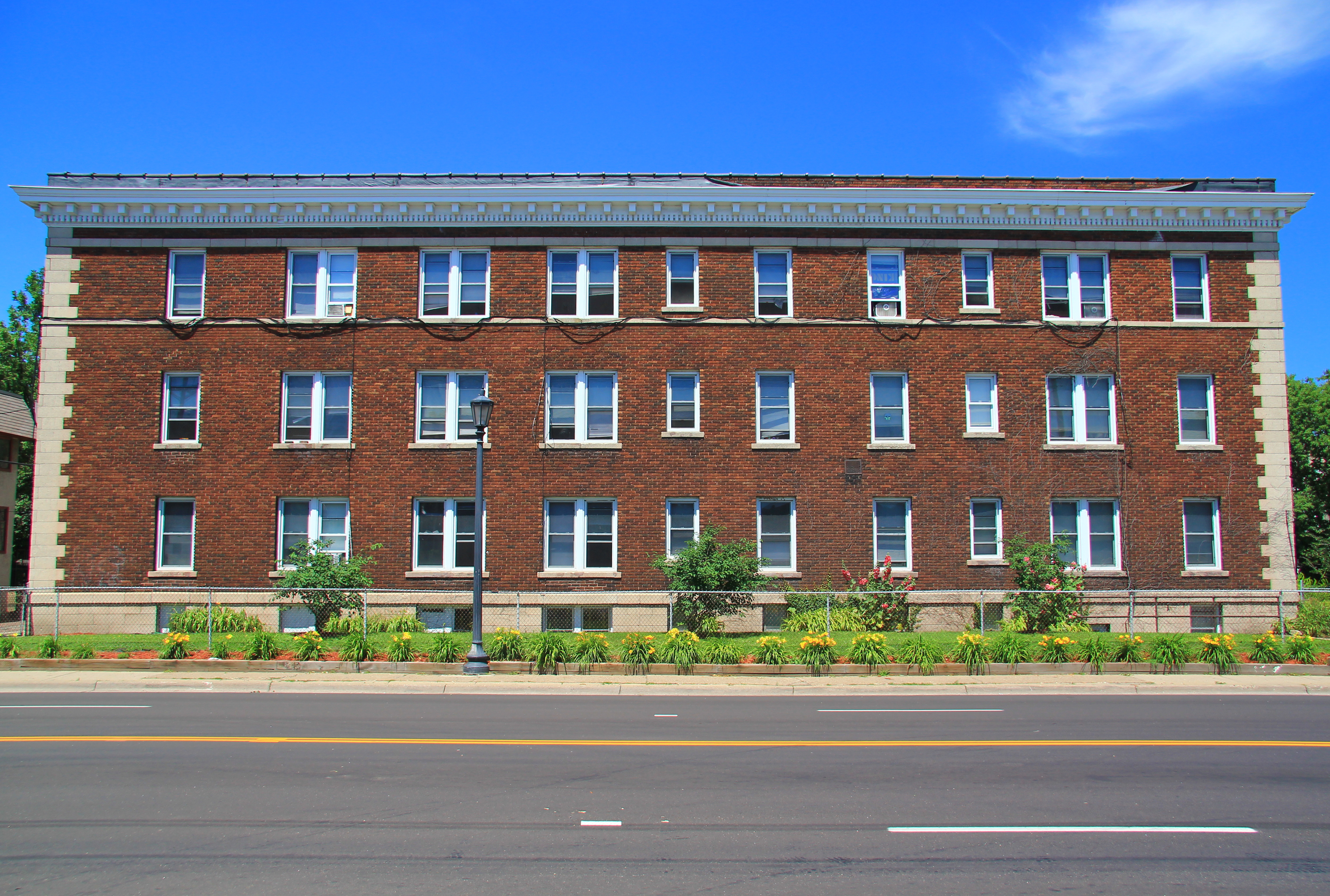

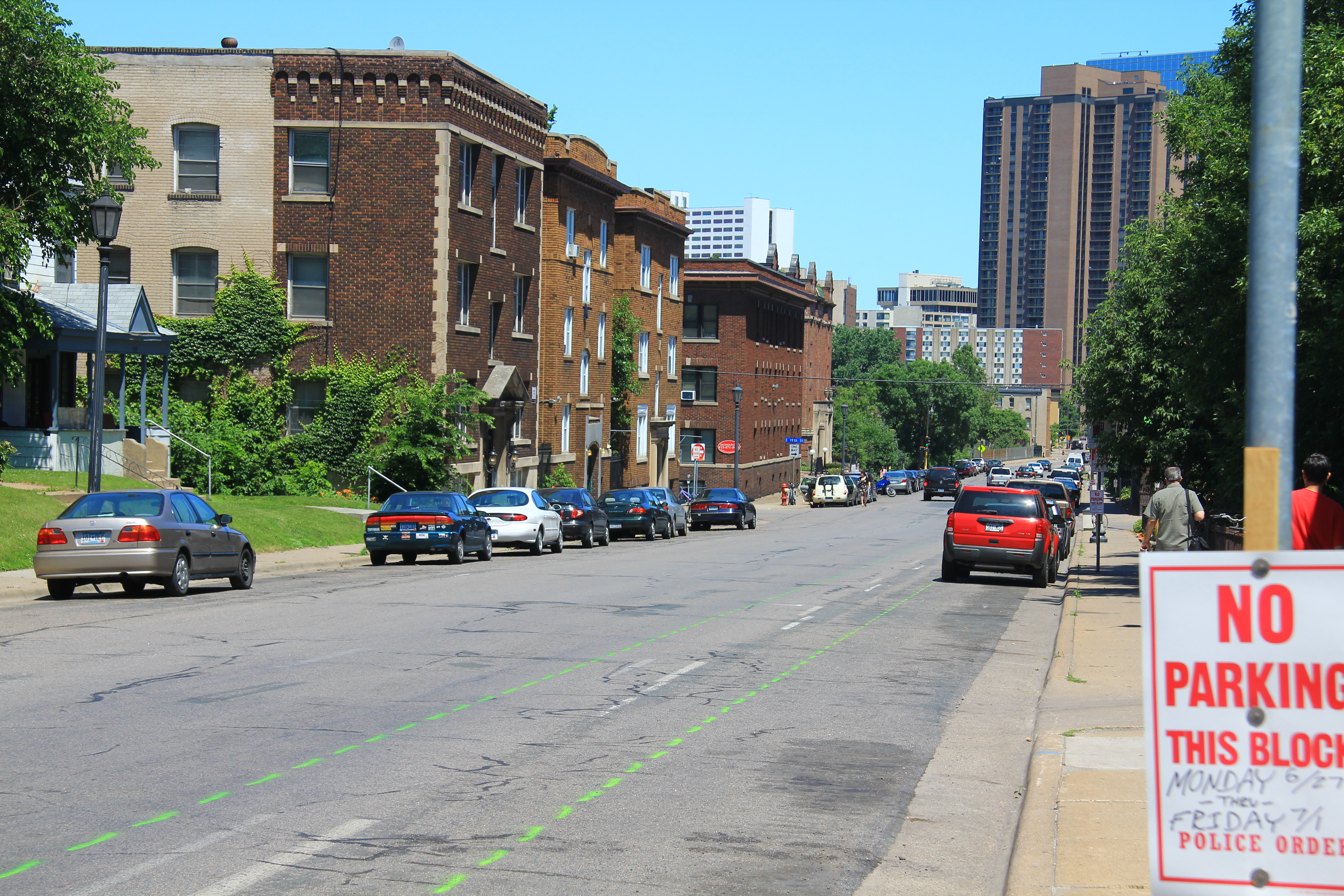

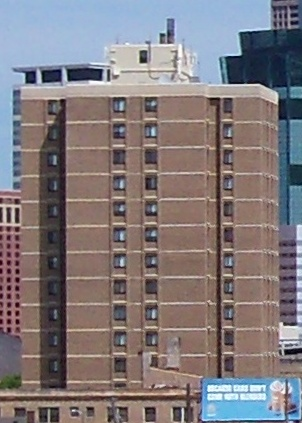

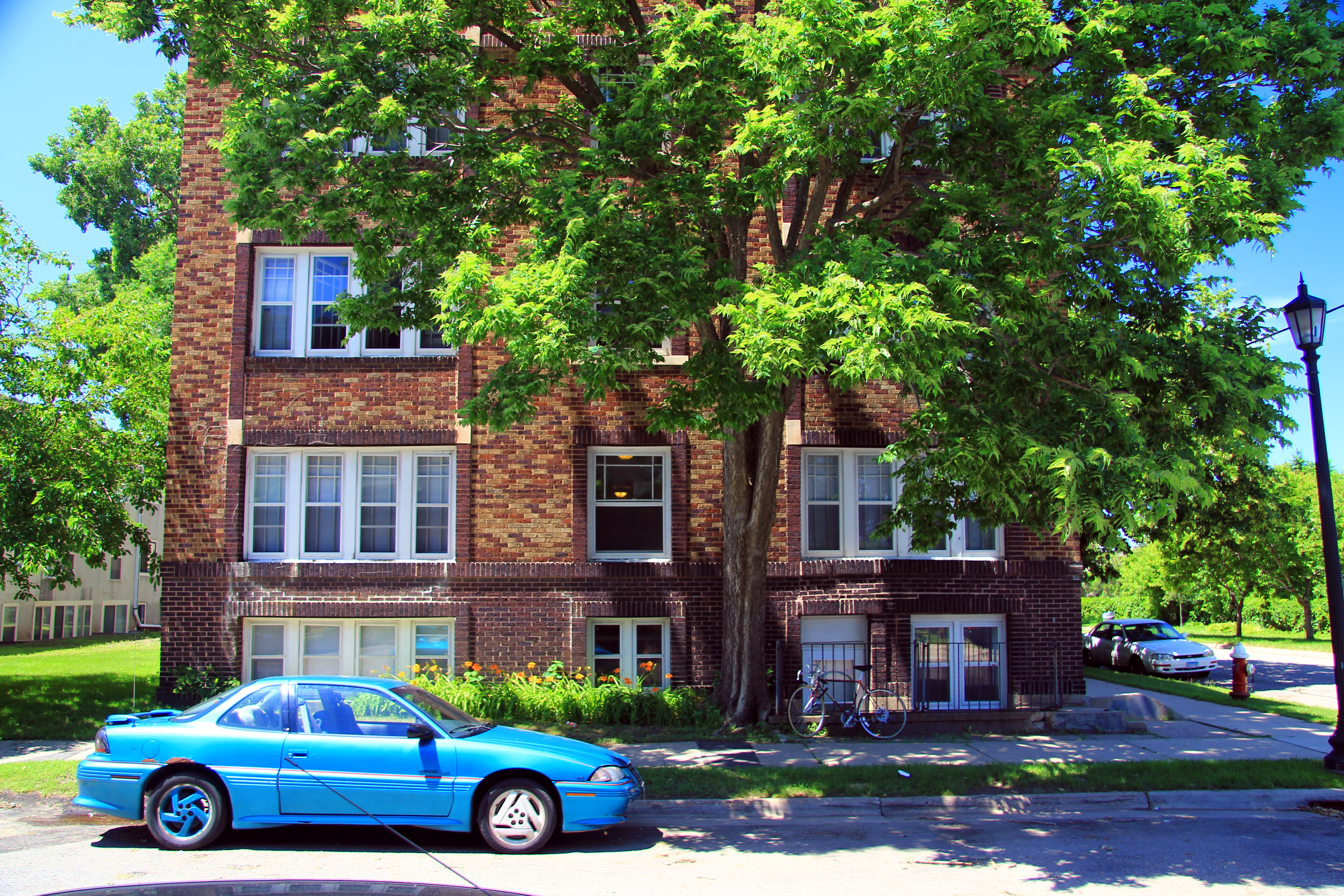

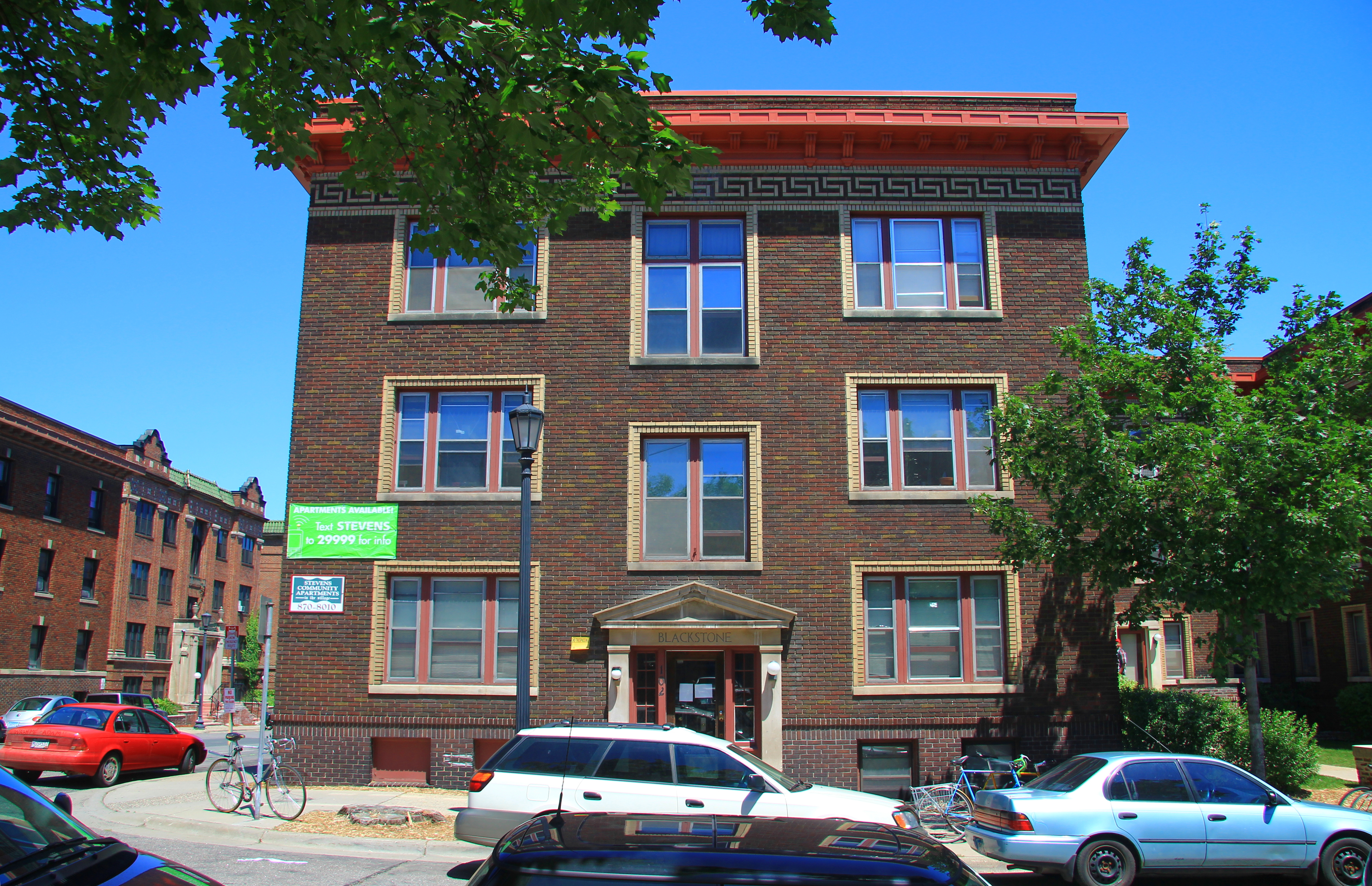

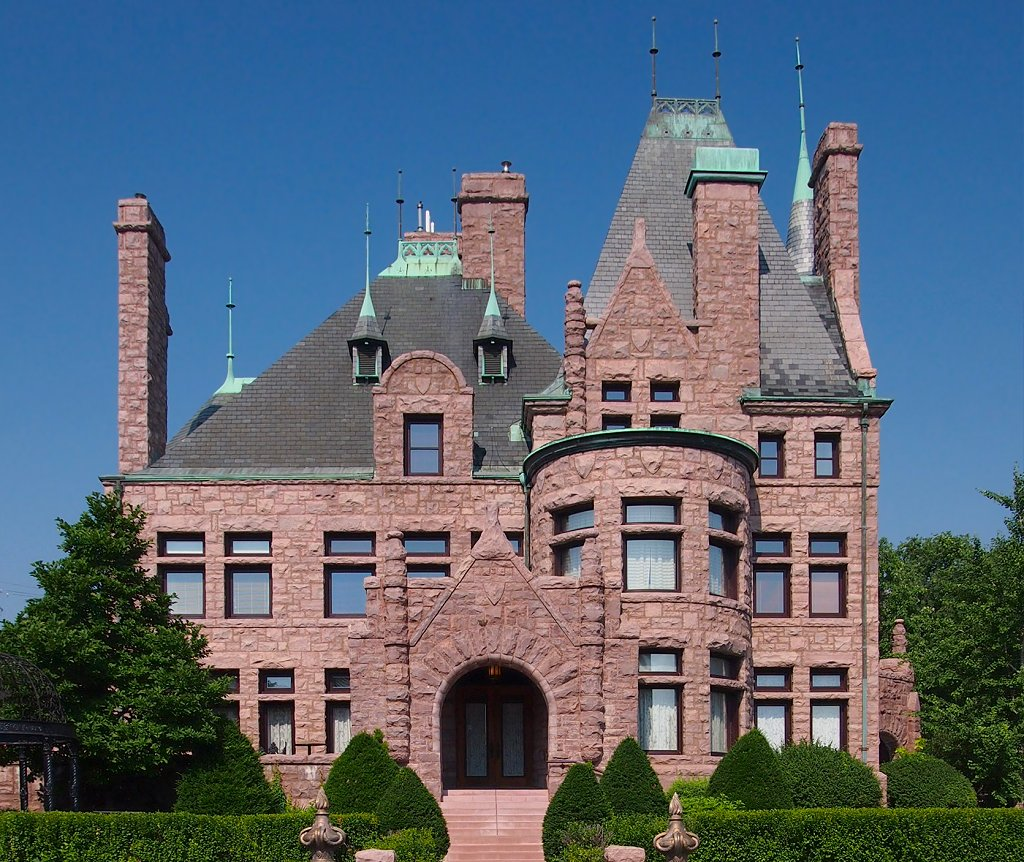

== See also ==
- Amos B. Coe House
