= Amos B. Coe House =

Historic house in Minnesota, United States

- U.S. National Register of Historic Places
- Minneapolis Landmark
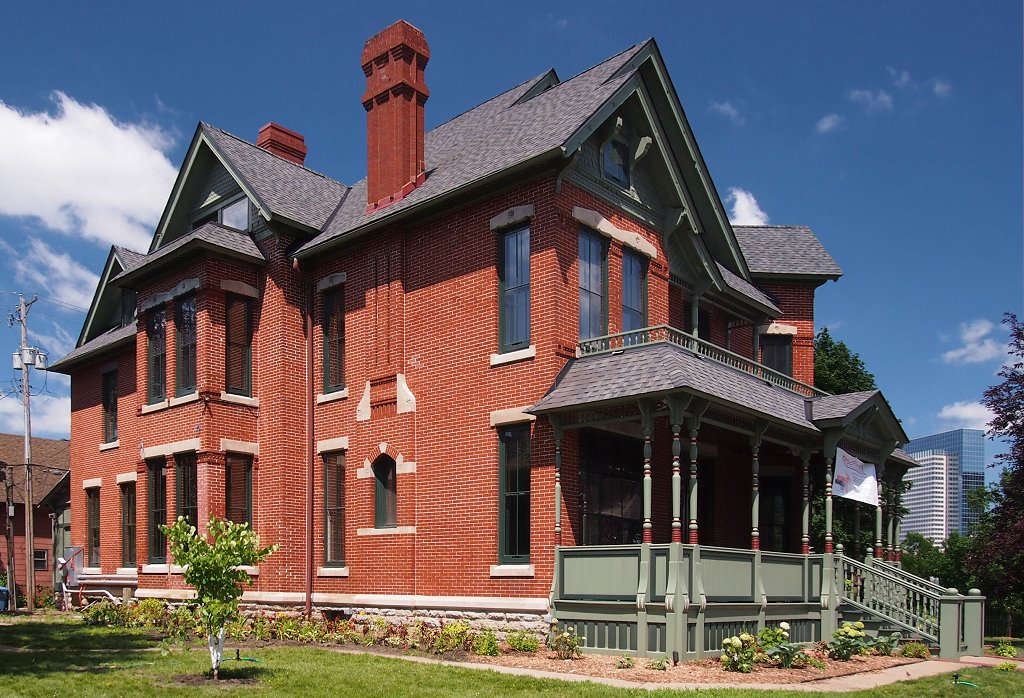
- The Amos B. Coe House from the southeast

- Location within Minnesota Location within the United States
- Location: 1700 S. 3rd Ave., Minneapolis, Minnesota
- Coordinates: 44°57′58.5″N 93°16′23″W
- Area: less than one acre
- Built: 1884
- Architectural style: Eastlake Style
- NRHP reference No.: 84001418

Significant dates
- Added to NRHP: January 12, 1984
- Designated MPLSL: 1983

The Amos B. Coe House is a historic home in Minneapolis, Minnesota, United States. It was built for a local real estate developer in 1884 in the Eastlake Style of Queen Anne architecture. A carriage house in the Shingle Style was added in 1886.

The house is located at 1700 3rd Avenue South in the Stevens Square neighborhood of Minneapolis. It was added to the National Register of Historic Places in 1984 for its architectural significance.

Attorneys for the construction, plumbing and electrical companies that had previously won a court judgment for unpaid work at the museum joined to purchase the property for $1.3 million: the total amount a judge found that they are owed. The group was the sole bidder at the public auction.

Beginning in 2008, the Minnesota African American Museum and Cultural Center occupied the structure. The museum began a $6 million fundraising effort to renovate it. Although the museum spent several million dollars on improvements, its fundraising effort failed to cover the cost of renovations. Creditors won a lawsuit in September 2015 evicting the museum. The creditors now jointly own the property. In 2016, the property and adjoining carriage house were divided into 9 apartments.
