= Dunwoody Village =

Retirement community in Philadelphia

Dunwoody Village is a non-profit Continuing Care Retirement Community located in Newtown Square, a western suburb of Philadelphia. The community is built on the grounds of an 83-acre (34 ha) campus that has a rich history of family ownership which reaches back to the time of the American Revolution.

== William Hood Dunwoody ==
The community is named for William Hood Dunwoody. It sits on land which his father James Dunwoody bought from his father-in-law, William Hood. Both the Hood and Dunwoody families had emigrated from England in the latter part of the 17th century.

As a farm boy in the 1840s, William Dunwoody attended school at the Hood Octagonal School which still stands on the property. After his schooling, Dunwoody learned to be a broker and dealer in grain from his uncle and by age 23 he formed the flour firm of Dunwoody & Robertson. In his childhood, Dunwoody had been sickly and, at the age of 28, he took his physician’s advice by moving to Minnesota where he could remain active in the grain business. He joined Washburn-Crosby Co. in Minneapolis, a prominent milling firm that produced the highly successful Gold Medal Flour. With them, Dunwoody pioneered overseas spring wheat sales and became a silent partner. After Dunwoody’s death, the company changed its commercial name to General Mills.

Dunwoody spent the rest of his life in Minnesota, returning to Pennsylvania annually in order to visit his parents and siblings. Although the family farm had been subdivided after his parents’ death, William used a part of his immense wealth to reconsolidate it for the purpose of establishing a charitable home in memory of his parents.

Dunwoody died in 1914, leaving a $1 million bequest to build a home in which sick or injured workers could recuperate until able to return to the workforce. In 1924, the Dunwoody Home opened its doors to needy men and operated with a trust fund that continues to this day caring for those in need.

By the late 1960s, recuperative care had been transformed by visiting nurses, hospital sponsored outpatient care, and homes with extensive infirmaries. As there was no longer a pressing societal need for the services of the Dunwoody Home, utilization declined and the facilities became outdated. On the other hand, the concept of a non-profit retirement community was evolving as a viable enterprise. The trustees of the Home sought and obtained court permission to establish a retirement village with continuing care. The trustees would oversee both the Home and the Village but the two would be separate financially and operationally.

== Dunwoody Village Retirement Community ==
Thus Dunwoody Village came into being with its first residents arriving in late 1974. This was early in the age of retirement villages as we know them today. As a result, the design of Dunwoody Village embraced some unique construction features seldom seen in subsequent retirement community designs. These include 12-foot-wide (3.7 m) heated hallways connecting all parts of the complex, atria with natural light and growing plants spread throughout the complex, and cinder block walls to isolate noise and prevent the spread of fire. An operating feature quite uncommon within continuing care communities elsewhere was United States postal delivery to each apartment door.

The accommodation plan for independent living was ahead of its time. Not only was there a mixture of studio, one bedroom, and two bedroom apartments, there were apartment suites located at ground level. These were termed country houses. Many communities developed at a later time offered villas, but these were free standing structures that involved some degree of exposure to the weather for residents to reach the core facility.

Dunwoody Village opened with skilled nursing and personal care facilities. Over the years, some of the notable improvements have been establishment of a long-term nursing pavilion, upgrading all double occupancy nursing rooms to single occupancy, and the means to provide special care for dementia patients.

The headwaters of Hunter Run rise on the grounds of Dunwoody Village. A large barn for farm animals built in 1924 to support the Dunwoody Home still stands. Unusual in having a glazed brick silo for fodder storage, this landmark gives a visual link to the historic nature of the property.

The Hood Octagonal School building occupies a prominent position on the grounds. Once thought to date back to 1798, thorough research revealed that it was erected in 1842 and the schoolhouse was entered on the National Register of Historic Places in 2006. An iconic image of the schoolhouse is used as the logo of Dunwoody Village and by the municipality.

The Dunwoody Home itself outlived its ability to provide charitable care both financially and structurally. It was closed in 1991 and demolished in May 1992. The few remaining residents were accommodated charitably in Dunwoody Village.

== See also ==
- Dunwoody Institute
- Dunwoody, Georgia, a city which has a neighborhood known as “Dunwoody Village”
