= List of elections in 1888 =

The following elections occurred in the year 1888.

== North America ==
=== Canada ===
- 1888 Manitoba general election
- 1888 North-West Territories general election

=== United States ===
- 1888 New York state election
- 1888 United States elections

==== United States Presidential ====
- 1888 United States presidential election

==== United States Senate ====
- 1888 and 1889 United States Senate elections
- 1889 United States Senate election in Massachusetts

==== United States House of Representatives ====
- 1888 United States House of Representatives elections
- 1888 United States House of Representatives elections in Alabama
- 1888 United States House of Representatives election in Arizona Territory
- 1888 United States House of Representatives elections in Arkansas
- 1888 United States House of Representatives elections in California
- 1888 United States House of Representatives election in Colorado
- 1888 United States House of Representatives elections in Connecticut
- 1888 United States House of Representatives election in Dakota Territory
- 1888 United States House of Representatives election in Delaware
- 1888 United States House of Representatives elections in Florida
- 1888 United States House of Representatives elections in Georgia
- 1888 United States House of Representatives election in Idaho Territory
- 1888 United States House of Representatives elections in Illinois
- 1888 United States House of Representatives elections in Indiana
- 1888 United States House of Representatives elections in Iowa
- 1888 United States House of Representatives elections in Kansas
- 1888 United States House of Representatives elections in Kentucky
- 1888 United States House of Representatives elections in Louisiana
- 1888 United States House of Representatives elections in Maine
- 1888 United States House of Representatives elections in Maryland
- 1888 United States House of Representatives elections in Massachusetts
- 1888 United States House of Representatives elections in Michigan
- 1888 Michigan's 11th congressional district special election
- 1888 United States House of Representatives elections in Minnesota
- 1888 United States House of Representatives elections in Mississippi
- 1888 United States House of Representatives elections in Missouri
- 1888 United States House of Representatives election in Montana Territory
- 1888 United States House of Representatives elections in Nebraska
- 1888 United States House of Representatives election in Nevada
- 1888 United States House of Representatives elections in New Hampshire
- 1888 United States House of Representatives elections in New Jersey
- 1888 United States House of Representatives election in New Mexico Territory
- 1888 United States House of Representatives elections in New York
- 1888 United States House of Representatives elections in North Carolina
- 1888 United States House of Representatives elections in Ohio
- 1888 United States House of Representatives election in Oregon
- 1888 United States House of Representatives elections in Pennsylvania
- 1888 United States House of Representatives elections in Rhode Island
- 1888 United States House of Representatives elections in South Carolina
- 1888 United States House of Representatives elections in Tennessee
- 1888 United States House of Representatives elections in Texas
- 1888 United States House of Representatives election in Utah Territory
- 1888 United States House of Representatives elections in Vermont
- 1888 United States House of Representatives elections in Virginia
- 1888 United States House of Representatives election in Washington Territory
- 1888 United States House of Representatives elections in West Virginia
- 1888 United States House of Representatives elections in Wisconsin
- 1888 United States House of Representatives election in Wyoming Territory

==== United States lieutenant gubernatorial ====
- 1888 Connecticut lieutenant gubernatorial election
- 1888 Illinois lieutenant gubernatorial election
- 1888 Minnesota lieutenant gubernatorial election
- 1888 Missouri lieutenant gubernatorial election
- 1888 Nebraska lieutenant gubernatorial election
- 1888 Texas lieutenant gubernatorial election
- 1888 Wisconsin lieutenant gubernatorial election

==== United States gubernatorial ====
- 1888 Alabama gubernatorial election
- 1888 Arkansas gubernatorial election
- 1888 Colorado gubernatorial election
- 1888 Connecticut gubernatorial election
- 1888 Florida gubernatorial election
- 1888 Georgia gubernatorial election
- 1888 Illinois gubernatorial election
- 1888 Indiana gubernatorial election
- 1888 Kansas gubernatorial election
- 1888 Louisiana gubernatorial election
- 1888 Maine gubernatorial election
- 1888 Massachusetts gubernatorial election
- 1888 Michigan gubernatorial election
- 1888 Minnesota gubernatorial election
- 1888 Missouri gubernatorial election
- 1888 Nebraska gubernatorial election
- 1888 New Hampshire gubernatorial election
- 1888 New York gubernatorial election
- 1888 North Carolina gubernatorial election
- 1888 Rhode Island gubernatorial election
- 1888 South Carolina gubernatorial election
- 1888 Tennessee gubernatorial election
- 1888 Texas gubernatorial election
- 1888 United States gubernatorial elections
- 1888 Vermont gubernatorial election
- 1888 West Virginia gubernatorial election
- 1888 Wisconsin gubernatorial election

==== United States mayoral elections ====
- 1888 Boston mayoral election
- 1888 Manchester, New Hampshire mayoral election
- 1888 New York City mayoral election

== Europe ==
- 1888 Belgian general election
- 1888 Dutch general election
- 1888 Liechtenstein local elections
- 1888 Norwegian parliamentary election
- March 1888 Serbian parliamentary election
- November 1888 Serbian parliamentary election

=== United Kingdom ===
- 1888 Ayr Burghs by-election
- 1888 Bristol West by-election
- 1888 Dewsbury by-election
- 1888 Dublin St Stephen's Green by-election
- 1888 Dublin University by-election
- 1888 Dundee by-election
- 1888 Gower by-election
- 1888 Isle of Thanet by-election
- 1888 Limerick City by-election
- 1888 Liverpool West Derby by-election
- 1888 Mid Lanarkshire by-election
- March 1888 Merthyr Tydfil by-election
- October 1888 Merthyr Tydfil by-election
- 1888 South Longford by-election
- 1888 South Sligo by-election

== See also ==
- Category:1888 elections
