= 1888 United States gubernatorial elections =

- November 6, 1888 (Note: Alabama, Arkansas, Georgia, Louisiana, Maine, Rhode Island and Vermont held early elections.)

26 state governorships
	Majority party	Minority party
Party	Democratic	Republican
Last election	22 governorships	16 governorships
Seats before	22	16
Seats after	19	19
Seat change	▼3	▲3
- Democratic hold Republican gain Republican hold

United States gubernatorial elections were held in 1888, in 26 states, concurrent with the House, Senate elections and presidential election, on November 6, 1888 (except in Alabama, Arkansas, Georgia, Louisiana, Maine, Rhode Island and Vermont, which held early elections).

In New Hampshire, the newly elected Governor's term began in the June following the election for the last time. Following an 1889 amendment to the State Constitution, the Governor's term would begin in the January following the election, beginning in 1890.

== Results ==
State	Incumbent	Party	Status	Opposing candidates
Alabama (held, 6 August 1888)	Thomas Seay	Democratic	Re-elected, 77.60%	W. T. Ewing (Republican) 22.24% J. C. Orr (Prohibition) 0.15% Scattering 0.01%
Arkansas (held, 3 September 1888)	Simon Pollard Hughes Jr.	Democratic	Lost re-nomination, Democratic victory	James Philip Eagle (Democratic) 54.09% Charles M. Norwood (Union Labor) 45.91%
Colorado	Alva Adams	Democratic	[data missing]	Job Adams Cooper (Republican) 53.87% Thomas M. Patterson (Democratic) 42.67% William C. Stover (Prohibition) 2.28% Gilbert De La Matyr (Prohibition) 1.18%
Connecticut	Phineas C. Lounsbury	Republican	Retired, Republican victory	Morgan Bulkeley (Republican) 47.94% Luzon B. Morris (Democratic) 48.86% Hiram Camp (Prohibition) 3.01% F. A. Andrews (Labor) 0.17% Scattering 0.01% (Legislative election) (Note: Since no candidate received 50% of the vote, the state legislature decided the election. Bulkeley was elected.) (held, 10 January 1889); Morgan Bulkeley, 159 votes Luzon B. Morris, 95 votes
Florida	Edward A. Perry	Democratic	Term-limited, Democratic victory	Francis P. Fleming (Democratic) 60.32% V. J. Shipman (Republican) 39.68%
Georgia (held, 3 October 1888)	John Brown Gordon	Democratic	Re-elected, 100.00%	
Illinois	Richard J. Oglesby	Republican	Retired, Republican victory	Joseph W. Fifer (Republican) 50.50% John M. Palmer (Democratic) 46.03% David H. Harts (Prohibition) 2.59% Willis W. Jones (Union Labor) 0.88%
Indiana	Isaac P. Gray	Democratic	Term-limited, Republican victory	Alvin Peterson Hovey (Republican) 49.03% Courtland C. Matson (Democratic) 48.62% Jasper Hughes (Prohibition) 1.85% John B. Milroy (Union Labor) 0.50%
Kansas	John A. Martin	Republican	Retired, Republican victory	Lyman U. Humphrey (Republican) 54.70% John Martin (Democratic) 32.51% Peter Percival Elder (Union Labor) 10.84% Jeremiah D. Botkin (Prohibition) 1.95%
Louisiana (held, 17 April 1888)	Samuel D. McEnery	Democratic	Lost renomination, Democrat victory	Francis T. Nicholls (Democratic) 72.73% Henry C. Warmoth (Republican) 27.27%
Maine (held, 10 September 1888)	Sebastian Streeter Marble (acting)	Republican	Lost re-nomination, Republican victory	Edwin C. Burleigh (Republican) 52.12% William LeBaron Putnam (Democratic) 42.19% Volney B. Cushing (Prohibition) 2.14% William H. Simmons (Union Labor) 1.05% Scattering 0.01%
Massachusetts	Oliver Ames	Republican	Re-elected, 52.71%	William E. Russell (Democratic) 44.53% William H. Earle (Prohibition) 2.73% Scattering 0.03%
Michigan	Cyrus G. Luce	Republican	Re-elected, 49.20%	Wellington R. Burt (Democratic) (Note: Burt ran under a fusion ticket between the Democrats and the Greenback Party.) 45.59% Amherst B. Cheney (Prohibition) 4.57% William Mills (Union Labor) 0.92%
Minnesota	Andrew Ryan McGill	Republican	Lost re-nomination, Republican victory	William Rush Merriam (Republican) 51.28% Eugene McLanahan Wilson (Democratic) 42.08% Hugh G. Harrison (Prohibition) 6.50% J. H. Paul (Labor) 0.15%
Missouri	Albert P. Morehouse (acting)	Democratic	Lost renomination, Democratic victory	David R. Francis (Democratic) 49.36% Elbert E. Kimball (Republican) 46.81% Ahira Manning (Union Labor) 2.98% Frank M. Lowe (Prohibition) 0.85%
Nebraska	John Milton Thayer	Republican	Re-elected, 51.26%	John A. McShane (Democratic) 42.11% George Bigelow (Prohibition) 4.69% David Butler (Labor) 1.94%
New Hampshire	Charles H. Sawyer	Republican	[data missing]	David H. Goodell (Republican) 49.45% Charles H. Amsden (Democratic) 48.79% Edgar L. Carr (Prohibition) 1.73% (Legislative election) (Note: Since no candidate received 50% of the vote, the state legislature decided the election. Goodell was elected.) (held, 5 June 1889); David H. Goodell, 168 votes Charles H. Amsden, 114 votes Edgar L. Carr, 1 vote
New York	David B. Hill	Democratic	Re-elected, 49.44%	Warner Miller (Republican) (Note: Miller ran under a fusion ticket between the Republicans and the United Labor Party.) 47.98% W. Martin Jones (Prohibition) 2.30% J. Edward Hall (Socialist Labor) 0.25% Lewis E. Page (Union Labor) 0.02% Nathan Wardner (United Labor) 0.00%
North Carolina	Alfred Moore Scales	Democratic	Term-limited, Democratic victory	Daniel Gould Fowle (Democratic) 51.97% Oliver H. Dockery (Republican) 46.93% William T. Walker (Prohibition) 1.09%
Rhode Island (held, 4 April 1888)	John W. Davis	Democratic	Defeated, 44.29%	Royal C. Taft (Republican) 52.33% George W. Gould (Prohibition) 3.34% Scattering 0.04%
South Carolina	John Peter Richardson III	Democratic	Re-elected, 99.97%	Scattering 0.03%
Tennessee	Robert Love Taylor	Democratic	Re-elected, 51.80%	Samuel W. Hawkins (Republican) 45.92% J. C. Johnson (Prohibition) 2.28%
Texas	Lawrence Sullivan Ross	Democratic	Re-elected, 71.77%	Marion Martin (Fusion) (Note: Martin ran under a fusion ticket between the Prohibition, Union Labor and Republican parties.) 28.23%
Vermont (held, 4 September 1888)	Ebenezer J. Ormsbee	Republican	Retired, Republican victory	William P. Dillingham (Republican) 69.89% Stephen C. Shurtleff (Democratic) 28.13% Henry M. Seeley (Prohibition) 1.98% Scattering 0.01%
West Virginia	Emanuel Willis Wilson	Democratic	Term-limited, Democratic victory following disputed election	(Original count); Nathan Goff Jr. (Republican) 49.27% Aretas B. Fleming (Democratic) 49.21% Scattering 1.52% (Revised count, conducted by legislature); Aretas B. Fleming (Democratic) 49.31% Nathan Goff Jr. (Republican) 49.16% Scattering 1.53% (Note: The election was disputed and was finally decided by the Democratic-controlled legislature in January 1890. As a result, Fleming did not assume the office until February 6, 1890.)
Wisconsin	Jeremiah McLain Rusk	Republican	Retired, Republican victory	William D. Hoard (Republican) 49.53% James Morgan (Democratic) 43.82% E. G. Durant (Prohibition) 4.05% David Frank Powell (Labor) 2.59% Scattering 0.01%

== See also ==
- 1888 United States elections

== Bibliography ==
- Glashan, Roy R. (1979). American Governors and Gubernatorial Elections, 1775-1978. Meckler Books. ISBN 0-930466-17-9.
- Gubernatorial Elections, 1787-1997. Washington, D.C.: Congressional Quarterly Inc. 1998. ISBN 1-56802-396-0.
- Dubin, Michael J. (2014). United States Gubernatorial Elections, 1861-1911: The Official Results by State and County. Jefferson, North Carolina: McFarland. ISBN 978-0-7864-4722-0.
- McPherson, Edward, ed. (1889). The Tribune Almanac and Political Register for 1889. New York, NY: The Tribune Association.
- J. A. Piper, Secretary of State (1895). Roster of Soldiers, Sailors and Marines of the War of 1812, the Mexican War, and the War of the Rebellion, Residing in Nebraska, June 1, 1895. York, Nebraska: Nebraska Newspaper Union. p. 128.
