= Governor Merriam =

Governor Merriam may refer to:

- Frank Merriam (1865–1955), 28th Governor of California
- William Rush Merriam (1849–1931), 11th Governor of Minnesota
