= Alfred Ames =

Alfred Ames may refer to:

- Alfred Elisha Ames (1814–1874), American physician and politician
- Alfred K. Ames (1866–1950), American politician, businessman and filmmaker
- Alfred Ernest Ames (1866–1934), Canadian investment dealer
- Alfred E. Ames, American politician, member of the Illinois House of Representatives
