= Hugh G. Harrison =

American politician (1822–1891)

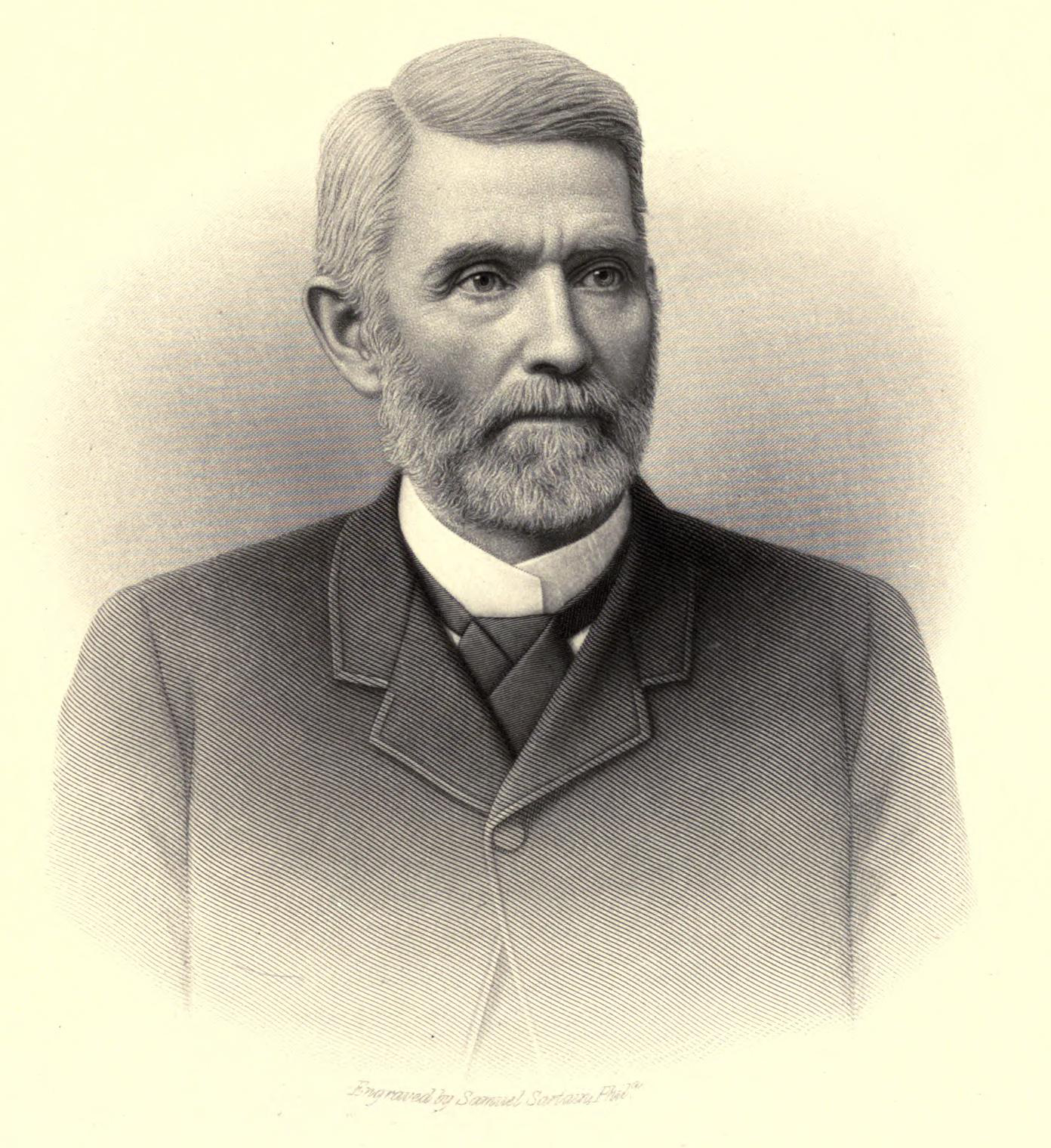
- Harrison c. 1894

2nd Mayor of Minneapolis
- In office April 14, 1868 – April 13, 1869
- Preceded by: Dorilus Morrison
- Succeeded by: Dorilus Morrison

Personal details
- Born: Hugh Galbraith Harrison; April 23, 1822 Belleville, Illinois, U.S.
- Died: August 12, 1891 (aged 69) Minneapolis, Minnesota, U.S.
- Resting place: Lakewood Cemetery
- Party: Republican; Prohibition
- Spouse(s): Irene Amelia Robinson (m. 1847; died 1876) Elizabeth Wood Hunt (m. 1877)
- Children: 5
- Parent(s): Rev. Thomas H. Harrison, Margaret (née Galbraith) Harrison

Hugh Galbraith^{a} Harrison (April 23, 1822 – August 12, 1891) was a real estate investor and banker who served as the second mayor of Minneapolis, Minnesota.

== Life and career ==
Hugh Galbraith Harrison was born the eighth of nine children on April 23, 1822, in Belleville, Illinois. He was of Scottish and Irish descent. While growing up he helped his father and older brothers who were involved in the milling business before attending college at McKendree University. In 1847 he married Irene Amelia Robinson. In 1859 he and two of his brothers relocated to Minneapolis, Minnesota where they invested in property as well as businesses including the First National Bank of St. Paul, the St. Paul & Sioux City Railroad and the Joseph Dean & Company lumber company.

In 1868 Harrison was elected as the second mayor of Minneapolis, serving from 1868 to 1869. There are few details of his term — sources note his administration was "businesslike" and "careful, capable and clean."

Harrison had five sons with his wife Irene: Edwin, George, Lewis, Hugh and Perry. His wife died in 1876. He remarried on October 25, 1877, to Elizabeth Wood Hunt of Allentown, Pennsylvania. That same year Harrison and his brothers took their profits and organized the Security Bank, one of the early city's largest financial institutions. Harrison served as the bank's vice president from 1877 to 1887 and as president from 1887 until his death.

Harrison ran for Governor of Minnesota in the 1888 election as the Prohibition Party's candidate, but came in third place with 6.51% of the vote, losing to Republican William Rush Merriam and Democrat Eugene McLanahan Wilson.

Harrison died on August 12, 1891, at his home on Nicollet Avenue in Minneapolis. He was buried in Lakewood Cemetery. He died of a heart failure resulting from a cold he caught while on a business trip.

== Electoral history ==
Minneapolis Mayoral Election, 1868
Party	Candidate	Votes	%
Republican	Hugh Galbraith Harrison	974	57.0%
Democratic	Franklin Beebe	734	43.0%
	Write-Ins and Scattering	2	0.00%
Total votes		1,710	100
Republican hold			

Minnesota gubernatorial election, 1888
Party	Candidate	Votes	%
Republican	William Rush Merriam	134,355	51.26
Democratic	Eugene McLanahan Wilson	110,251	42.07
Prohibition	Hugh G. Harrison	17,026	6.50
Union Labor	Jabez Paul	385	0.15
	Write-Ins	72	0.03
Total votes		262,089	100
Republican hold			

== Notes ==
^a Most sources use "Galbraith" though his gravestone spells his middle name "Gilbraith".

Political offices
Preceded by Dorilus Morrison	Mayor of Minneapolis; 1868 – 1869	Succeeded by Dorilus Morrison
Party political offices
Preceded by James E. Child	Prohibition Party nominee for Governor of Minnesota; 1888	Succeeded by James P. Pinkham
