= Northwestern Consolidated Milling Company =

Former American flour milling company

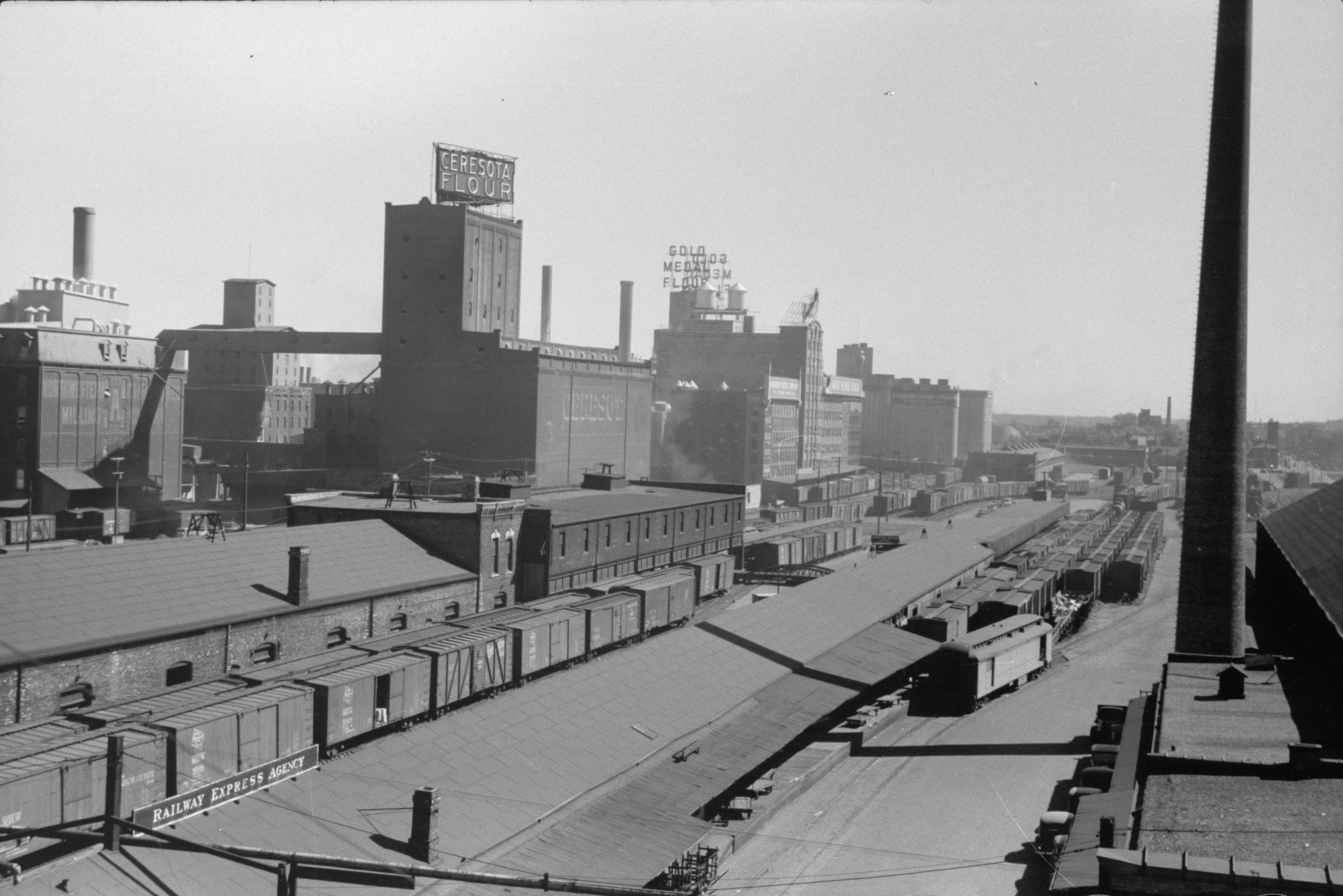
Railways at Northwestern (left) and General Mills, (center right)

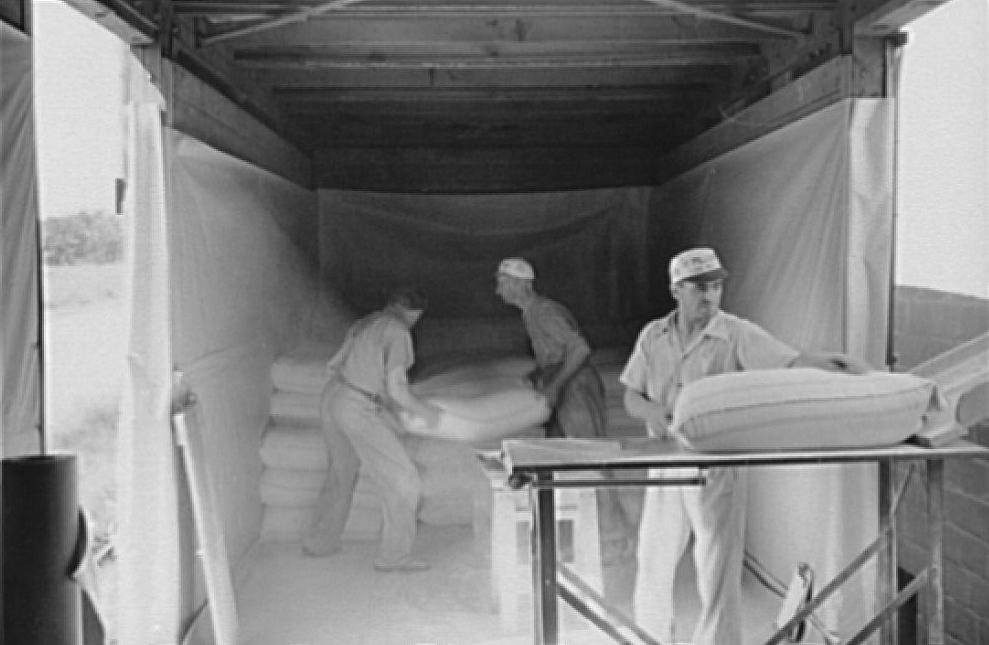
Loading flour in a boxcar, 1939

Northwestern Consolidated Milling Company was an American flour milling company that operated about one-quarter of the mills in Minneapolis, Minnesota, when the city was the flour milling capital of the world. Formed as a business entity, Northwestern produced flour for the half-century between 1891 and 1953, when its A Mill was converted to storage and light manufacturing. At its founding, Northwestern was the city's and the world's second-largest flour milling company after Pillsbury, with what is today General Mills a close third. The company became one of three constituents of a Minneapolis oligopoly that owned almost nine percent of the country's flour and grist production and products by 1905. This occurred as a result of their attempt at a United States monopoly.

== History ==
Consolidation of Minneapolis Flour Mills
Year	Companies	Market Share
1882	2	51%
1882	16	about 49%
1890	4	87%
1900	3	97%

1891 Capacity in Barrels
Company	Mills	Daily
Pillsbury-Washburn	5	14,500
Northwestern Consol.	6	10,500
Washburn-Crosby	3	9,500
Minneapolis Flour Mfg. Co.	4	3,500

Technological advances in flour milling were already in place by the 1880s, when 18 different millers operated in Minneapolis. From that point on and for the next 50 years, mergers and changes in business administration were the primary developments in the industry.

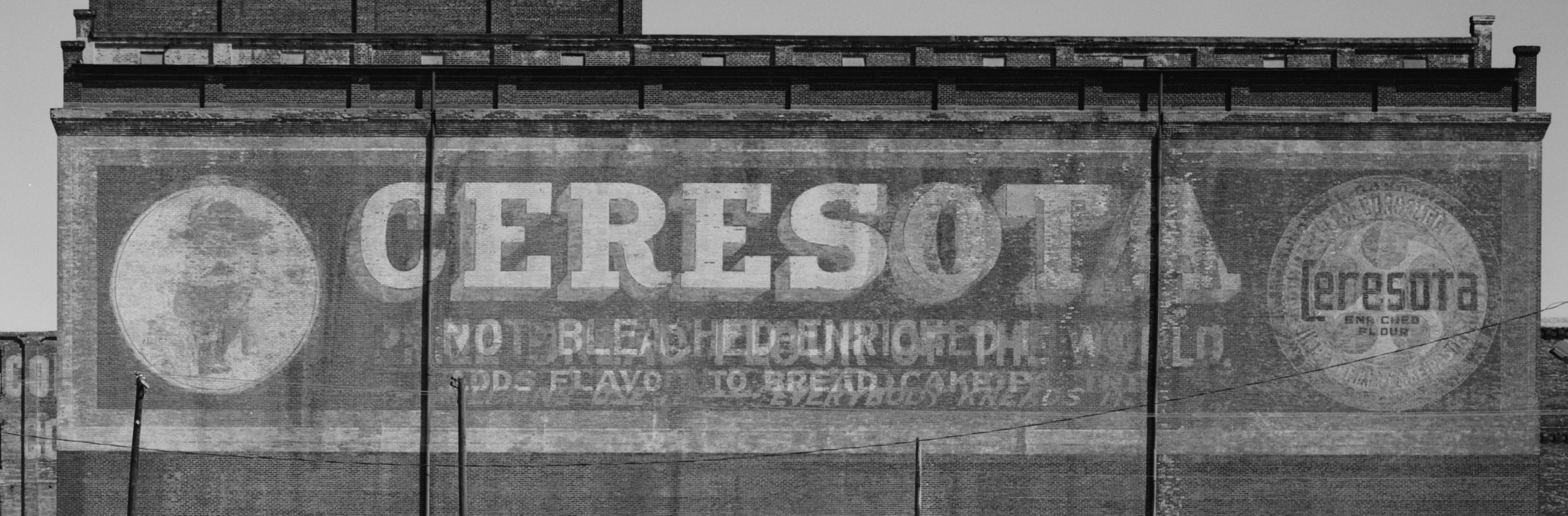
Sign for Ceresota brand flour

Northwestern and their new Ceresota flour brand name were established in July 1891 by a group of businessmen led by former lumberman John Martin at six independent existing mills—the Crown Roller (2,500 barrels/day), Columbia (2,000), Northwestern (1,600), Pettit (1,600, to be an elevator), Galaxy (1,500) and Zenith (1,100). Martin became president, Joel B. Bassett was vice president, C. T. Fox was secretary and treasurer, and Fred C. Pillsbury, E. Zeidler and Albert C. Loring were the managers. The company grew to nine mills and several elevator and storage facilities. Loring's father Charles M. Loring was one of the directors.

Northwestern's first decade was marked by financial instability because its founders paid too much for its properties and suffered from lack of capital. A reorganization followed in 1895 that somewhat alleviated the company's problems. In 1898–1899 the United States Milling Company formed at the Hecker-Jones-Jewell mills in New York City with the goal of becoming a flour monopoly by owning nearly all of the country's spring wheat mills. Northwestern, though, was the only company they acquired. Financially troubled, U.S. Milling in 1900 reorganized and became the Standard Milling Company with Northwestern as a subsidiary.

By combining six mills, Northwestern's capacity was the second largest in the world at the time of its founding, after the giant Pillsbury-Washburn, and slightly more than Washburn, Crosby. By 1900, these three companies were an oligopoly holding 97 percent of the Minneapolis market. In 1928 Washburn, Crosby became General Mills in a merger of U.S. millers and surpassed Pillsbury to become the world's largest flour milling company. In recent years General Mills acquired Pillsbury.

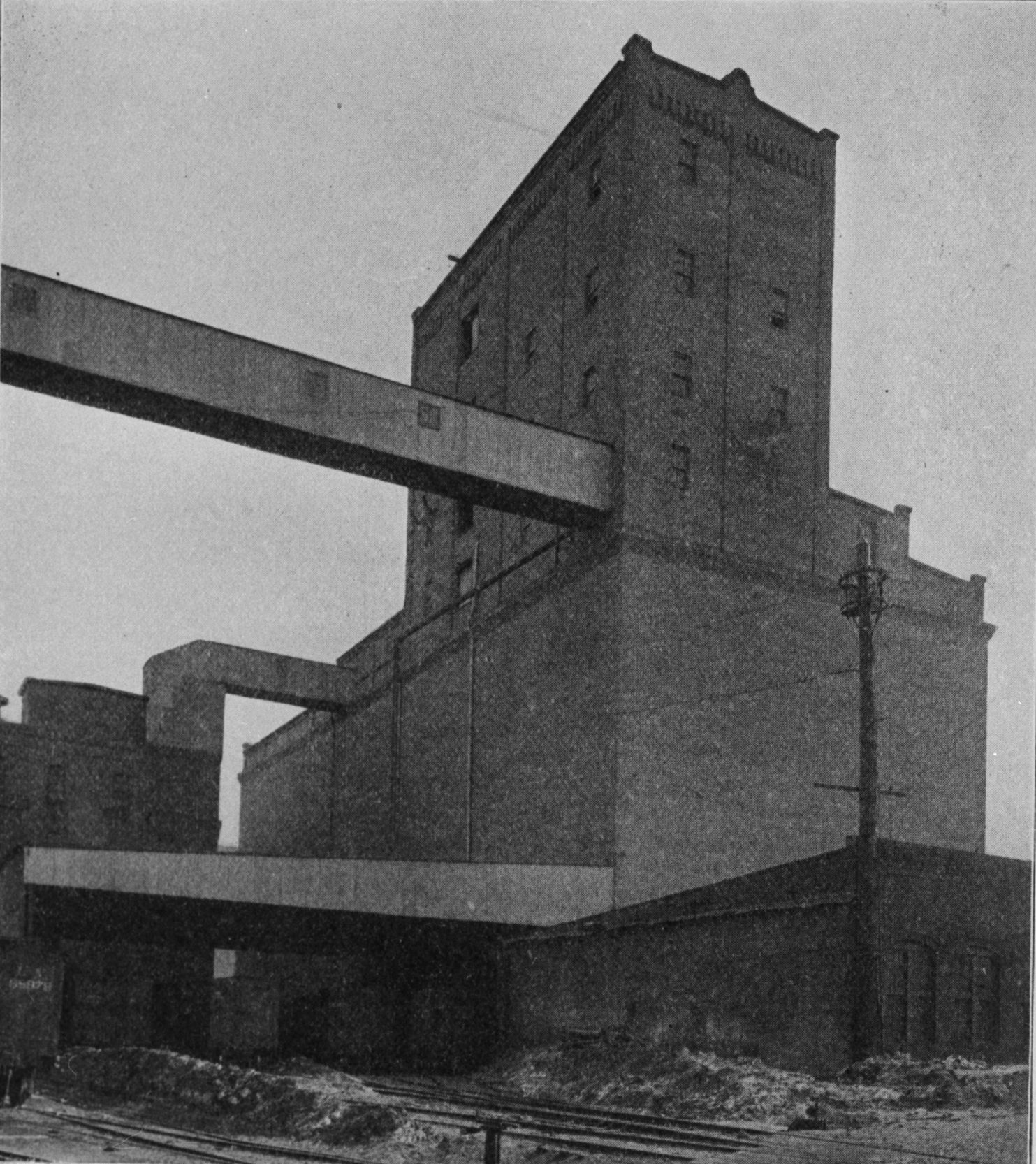
"The Million Bushel Elevator," Elevator A built in 1908

In January 1909, Northwestern opened its state of the art Elevator A, possibly the largest grain elevator ever built of brick. The elevator could hold 1,000,000 bushels of grain and its conveyors could each move 10,000 bushels per hour to the Crown Roller and Standard mills. Along with Elevator B known as the Pettit Mill of which only the foundation remains, Almost all the properties in this article are contributing resources to the St. Anthony Falls Historic District which is on the National Register of Historic Places.

=== Ceresota brand ===
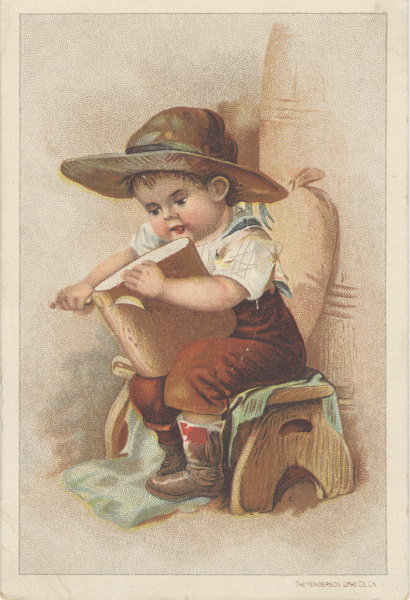
Advertising image of Ceres Ota

The company named Ceresota Flour for an invented son of the Greek goddess Ceres, Ceres Ota. The advertising story described a young boy exploring earth in a costume of gifts from different countries. An Egyptian king provided his trousers; from Italy, he got his blue blanket; the Amazon contributed his bench, boots, suspenders, and shirt; Japan gave him a gold shield; and a miller gifted him with the brown sombrero. Each Ceresota Flour sack displayed a picture of Ceres Ota slicing a giant loaf of bread.

Ceresota is now a brand name of The Uhlmann Company and American Home Foods.

== Today ==
After the center of U.S. flour milling moved to the east coast, the company's A and F Mills closed during the 1940s and 1950s. Of the 34 Minneapolis flour mills, only four are still standing on the Mississippi's west bank. Of the four, the Crown Roller Mill and the Standard Mill were Northwestern mills (the A and F mills). Of concern to preservationists, Omni Investment had plans to build a condominium development on top of the remains of the Northwestern B mill and adjacent archaeological sites but the plan is stopped and is now in the court system. The plan was defeated and the Park Board redeveloped the site into Water Works Pavilion and Restaurant (2021). Elevator A was converted to an office building in 1987, and converted again about 2015 to Millers Landing Senior Living. Crown Roller Mill is in use today as an office building. The Standard Mill became the Whitney Hotel (1987) but closed. It is now the Whitney Lofts (2007).

== Mills ==
Northwestern Consolidated Mills
Mill	Owners	Architect/Construction	Extant	Northwestern	Remains	Image
Crown Roller Mill	Charles Morgan Hardenbergh, John A. Christian, Llewellyn Christian, Charles Everett French	William F. Gunn	1879-	A Mill	office building	Crown Roller Mill today in winter
Columbia Mill	Columbia Mill Company		1882-1941	B Mill aka Ceresota Mill	under Water Works Pavilion, visible from Mississippi	
Galaxy Mill	W. P. Ankeny, W. F. Cahill, Loren Fletcher, Charles M. Loring, Albert C. Loring		1874-1931	C Mill	foundation visible, Mill Ruins Park	artist's rendition of the explosion on top of an old photo with the location of the Galaxy Mill marked
Northwestern Mill	Siddle, Loren Fletcher and Holmes, John Martin		1879-1931	D Mill	foundation visible, Mill Ruins Park	image
Zenith Mill	Leonard Day and M. B. Rollins		1871-1931	E Mill	foundation visible, Mill Ruins Park	image
Standard Mill	Ebenezer White and Dorilus Morrison, Whitney Hotel	Otis Arkwright Pray and William Dixon Gray	1879-	F Mill	Whitney Lofts (2007)	old photo before mill became a hotel
Arctic/St. Anthony Mill	Perkins, Crocker, and Co., Hineline, Plenk and Wheeler		1866-1919	H Mill	foundation visible	city block of old mills (Cataract, Holly, Union and Arctic)
Elevator A / Ceresota	Northwestern	George T. Honstain, Fred W. Cooley	1908-	Elevator A	Millers Landing Senior Living	old photo of the whole elevator
Pettit Mill	Pettit, Robinson, and Company		1875-1931	Elevator B	visible, Mill Ruins Park	image
New City Waterworks	City of Minneapolis		1883-ca.1931	storage	foundation remains	
Union Mill	Henry Gibson		1863-ca. 1919/29	storage	foundation visible	city block of old mills (Cataract, Holly, Union and Arctic)
Minneapolis Boiler Works	M. W. Glenn, unknown		ca. 1878 - 1985	storage	foundation probably destroyed	old photo from 1985, Ceresota building visible at right
Phoenix Iron Works	D. Douglas and J. M. Schultz, Wilford and Northway		ca.1881-1985	storage	foundation probably destroyed	

== See also ==
- Ceresota Building
- History of Minneapolis
- St. Anthony Falls Historic District
- Whitney Mill Quarter Redevelopment a 1980s redevelopment of the Crown Roller Mill, Standard Mill, Ceresota Elevator and Minneapolis Boiler Works
