= Charles Canning =

Member of the Minnesota House of Representatives from the 45 district
- In office January 6, 1885 – January 3, 1887
- Preceded by: A. H. Baker
- Succeeded by: A. H. Baker

Personal details
- Born: April 6 1842 Derry
- Died: April 8 1894 Hendrum, Minnesota

Charles Canning (April 6, 1842 – April 8, 1894) was a politician from the U.S. state of Minnesota.

He was born in Derry on April 6, 1842. He immigrated to Hendrum, Minnesota in 1878. He was elected to the Minnesota House of Representatives, representing District 45 from 1885-1887. He was elected as a Republican but switched to become a Populist. Canning participated in the founding meeting of the Knights of Labor on October 4, 1887. In 1888, he ran for Minnesota's 5th congressional district, being defeated by Solomon G. Comstock. In 1890, he ran for the Democratic nomination for Governor, running on a progressive ticket against conservative Eugene McLanahan Wilson. Canning would lose the primary. In 1892, he unsuccessfully ran for house District 54.

On April 8, 1894, Canning committed suicide at his farm near Hendrum.
