= Eli B. Ames =

American lawyer, postmaster, judge, and politician (1820–1898)

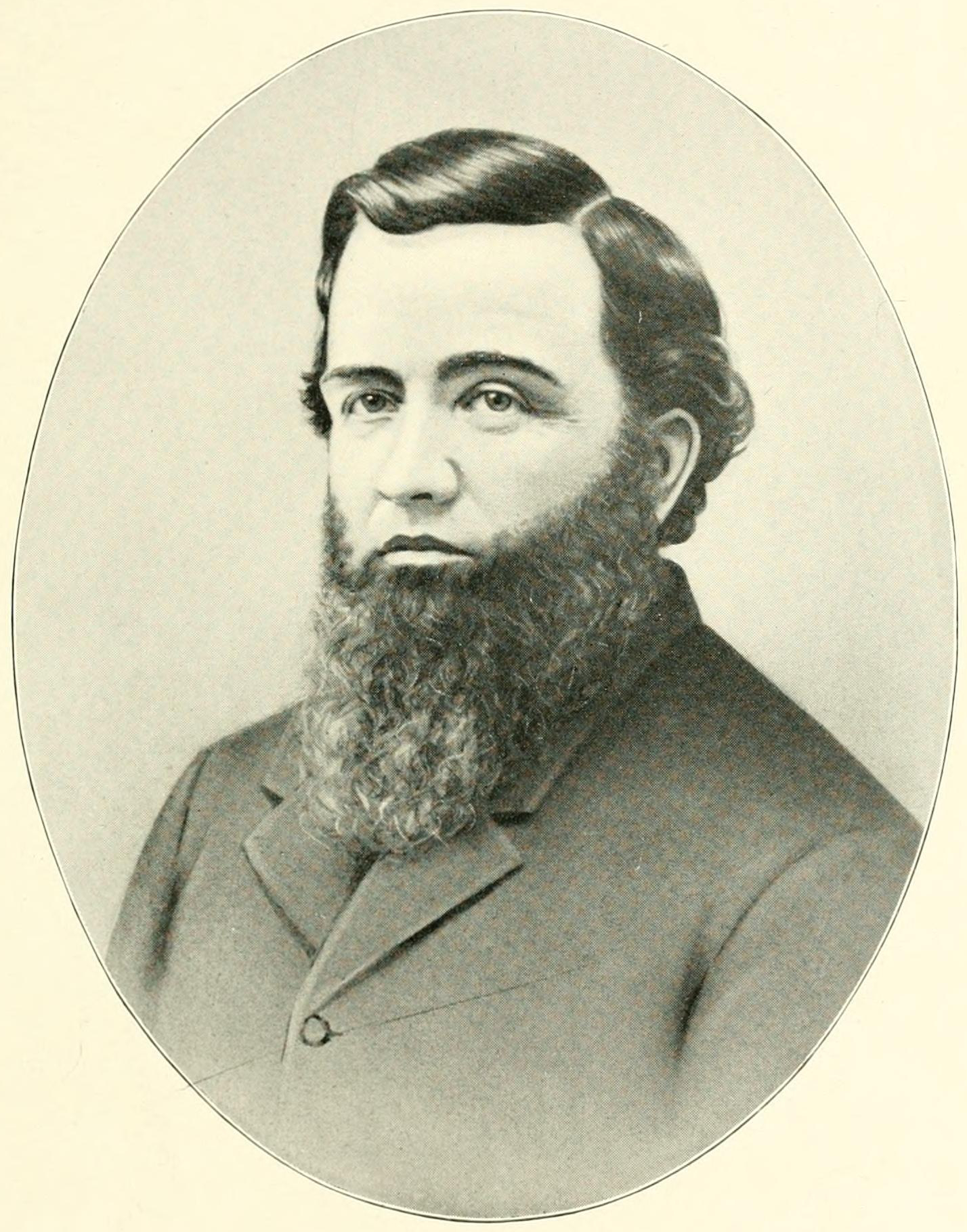
- Ames c. 1903

4th Mayor of Minneapolis
- In office April 12, 1870 – April 9, 1872
- Preceded by: Dorilus Morrison
- Succeeded by: Eugene McLanahan Wilson

Personal details
- Born: August 3, 1820 Colchester, Vermont, U.S.
- Died: February 12, 1898 (aged 77) Minneapolis, Minnesota, U.S.
- Resting place: Lakewood Cemetery
- Party: Democratic
- Spouse: Delia A. Payne (m. 1854)
- Children: 1
- Relatives: Alfred Elisha Ames (brother)

Eli B. Ames (August 3, 1820 – February 12, 1898) was a lawyer, postmaster, judge, and Democratic politician who served as the fourth mayor of Minneapolis, Minnesota.

== Early life ==
Eli B. Ames was born on August 3, 1820, in Colchester, Vermont. His brother was Alfred Elisha Ames. In 1832, his family moved to Ohio, later relocating to Ottawa, Illinois. While there, he studied law and was admitted to the bar in 1842.

== Career ==
Ames moved to Hennepin, Illinois, where he served as postmaster and later as a probate judge.

Ames served in the Illinois House of Representatives from 1851 to 1852. After his term in the Illinois General Assembly, he worked as an aide to Joel Aldrich Matteson^{a}. In 1855, he was appointed to the American consulate in Hamburg, Germany as consul. While serving as consul, he negotiated a postal treaty with Germany.

In 1857, he arrived in Minneapolis, Minnesota where he started an insurance business. From 1861 to 1864, he served as the secretary of the Minnesota Senate. Later, he served two, one-year terms as the mayor of Minneapolis from 1870 to 1872, defeating his brother Alfred in the second election.^{b} In 1873, Ames lost his bid for a third term as mayor. He unsuccessfully ran for the Minneapolis School Board in 1875.

== Personal life ==
Ames married Delia A. Payne on May 31, 1854, in St. Louis. He had a daughter, Mrs. Hasey.

Ames died on February 12, 1898, at his home on Second Avenue South in Minneapolis. He was buried in Lakewood Cemetery in Minneapolis.

== Electoral history ==
- Minneapolis Mayoral Election, 1870
  - Eli B. Ames 1,005
  - Paris Gibson 782
  - Henry G. Sidle 1
  - Write-Ins and Scattering 7
- Minneapolis Mayoral Election, 1871
  - Eli B. Ames 1,083
  - Alfred Elisha Ames 557
- Minneapolis Mayoral Election, 1873
  - George A. Brackett 2,188
  - Eli B. Ames 1,362

== Notes ==
^aSources note that he was an aide to "Governor Madison", though based on the timing and his location, it appears likely they meant Governor Matteson.
^bEli Ames's nephew, A. A. Ames, son of Eli's brother Alfred, served four terms as mayor of Minneapolis between 1876 and 1902.

Political offices
Preceded by Dorilus Morrison	Mayor of Minneapolis; 1870 – 1872	Succeeded by Eugene McLanahan Wilson
