= Dorilus Morrison =

American businessman and politician (1814–1897)

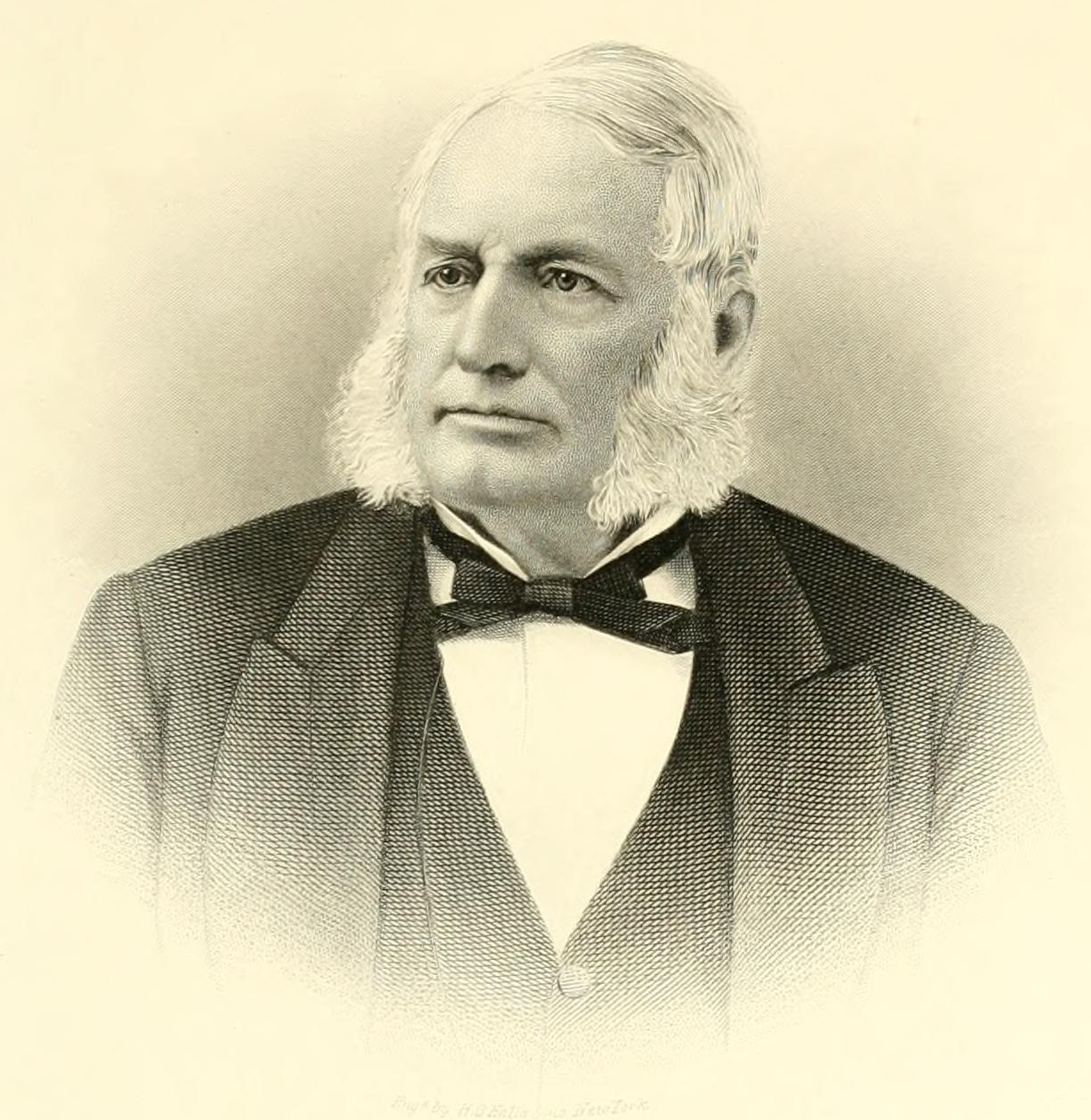
- Morrison c. 1893

1st and 3rd Mayor of Minneapolis
- In office April 13, 1869 – April 12, 1870
- Preceded by: Hugh G. Harrison
- Succeeded by: Eli B. Ames
- In office February 26, 1867 – April 14, 1868
- Preceded by: Position Established
- Succeeded by: Hugh G. Harrison

Member of the Minnesota Senate from the 5th district
- In office January 5, 1864 – January 1, 1866
- Preceded by: Rufus J. Baldwin
- Succeeded by: Curtis H. Pettit

Personal details
- Born: December 27, 1814 Livermore, Massachusetts (now part of Maine), U.S.
- Died: June 26, 1897 (aged 82) Minneapolis, Minnesota, U.S.
- Resting place: Lakewood Cemetery
- Party: Republican
- Spouses: Harriet (Putnam) Morrison; (died 1880)
- Children: DeWitt Clinton Morrison^{(b. 1842; died 1913)}; George H. Morrison^{(b. 1843; died 1882)}; Grace E. (Kimball)^{(b. 1851; died 1907)}

Dorilus Morrison (December 27, 1814 – June 26, 1897) was an American banker, businessman, and Republican politician. He was the first and third Mayor of Minneapolis and was a member of the Minnesota Senate.

== Life and career ==
Morrison was born in Livermore, Maine. His first business was as a merchant supporting the lumber industry near Bangor, Maine. In 1854, Morrison visited Minnesota to investigate potential lumber interests. He was sufficiently impressed that he sold his businesses in Maine and moved to St. Anthony, Minnesota within a year. He became involved in the local lumber and milling industries (along with his fellow Mainer William D. Washburn) and became an early investor in the Minneapolis Milling Company (forerunner of today's General Mills).

In 1863, Morrison was elected to represent the 5th district in the Minnesota State Senate and served from 1864 to 1865. When the city of Minneapolis was formally incorporated in 1867, Morrison was elected as its first mayor. He was re-elected to a second term in 1869 and ran unsuccessfully for a third in 1872.

Morrison supported the initial construction of the Northern Pacific Railroad along with William Washburn, George A. Brackett, William S. King and others. When the Northwestern National Bank of Minneapolis was chartered in 1872, Morrison was its first president. Around that same time, he began building a streetcar line in the city. He joined with other businessmen, and eventually hired Thomas Lowry, who got the line up and running in 1875. The line eventually merged with a line in neighboring St. Paul to become Twin City Rapid Transit.

Morrison died at his home on June 26, 1897. He was buried in Lakewood Cemetery.

== Electoral history ==
- Minneapolis Mayoral Election, 1867
  - Dorilus Morrison^{a}
- Minneapolis Mayoral Election, 1869
  - Dorilus Morrison 859
  - Henry G. Sidle 756
- Minneapolis Mayoral Election, 1872
  - Eugene McLanahan Wilson 2,208
  - Dorilus Morrison 1,534

== Notes ==
^aNo specific record of the vote exists, only the result.

Political offices
| New title | Mayor of Minneapolis; 1867 – 1868 | Succeeded by Hugh G. Harrison |
| Preceded by Hugh G. Harrison | Mayor of Minneapolis; 1869 – 1870 | Succeeded by Eli B. Ames |
