= Lord Gordon Gordon =

British fraudster

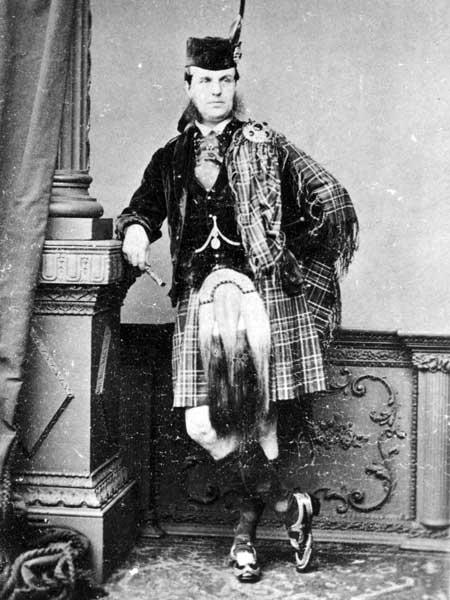
- Born: John Crowningsfield c. 1840; United Kingdom
- Died: August 1, 1874 (aged 33–34); Headingley, Manitoba, Canada
- Other names: Lord Gordon-Gordon; Lord Glencairn; The Hon. Mr. Herbert Hamilton
- Occupation: Con artist

Lord Gordon-Gordon (c. 1840 – August 1, 1874), also known as Lord Gordon Gordon, Lord Glencairn, and The Hon. Mr. Herbert Hamilton, was a British impostor responsible for a major swindle in 19th century United States. He swindled a million dollars from Jay Gould (equivalent to 27 million dollars in 2025), who was fighting for control of the Erie Railroad, and then fled to Canada. Gould and associates attempted to kidnap him but were arrested themselves, which nearly caused a military confrontation between the United States and Canada.

== Life in Britain ==
Little is known about the early life of Lord Gordon-Gordon. His real name was John Crowningsfield and it was rumoured that he was the illegitimate son of a North Country clergyman and his family maid. The first incident involving him was in 1868 under the name of "Lord Glencairn", when he swindled London jewellers Marshall & Son for £25,000, equivalent to £2,400,000 in 2025. In March 1870, he left Britain and travelled to the United States.

== Swindles in America ==
Glencairn took the name "Lord Gordon-Gordon" as his alias, claiming to be a cousin of the Campbell clan, a descendant of Lochinvar and of the ancient kings of the Scottish Highlands. He arrived in Minneapolis, Minnesota and became involved with the Northern Pacific Railway. He told them that he was in America so that he could buy large tracts of land on which to settle tenants from his over-populated estates in Scotland.

His next major incident came three months later when he moved to New York City, claiming that he was going to transfer his funds from Scotland in order to finance his land purchase. He carried a letter of introduction from Gould, who was then trying to gain control of the Erie Railroad in the Erie War. Gordon-Gordon told Gould that he could help him gain control of the railroad, with the help of several Europeans who had stock in the company, on the condition that he give Gordon-Gordon a million dollars in negotiable stock in what he called "a pooling of interests". However, as soon as Gould delivered the stock, he turned it around and sold it.

Gould sued Gordon-Gordon, and he was put on trial in March 1873. He gave the names of Europeans whom he claimed to represent, and the court granted him bail while checking the references. Gordon-Gordon took this opportunity to flee to Canada where he convinced authorities that the allegations were false. He then offered to buy large parts of Manitoba, an investment which would bring prosperity to Canada.

Gould was unable to convince Canadian authorities to hand over Gordon-Gordon, so he attempted to abduct him with his associates, including future members of Congress Loren Fletcher, John Gilfillan, Eugene McLanahan Wilson, and then-mayor of Minneapolis, George A. Brackett. They were successful, but they were stopped and arrested by the North-West Mounted Police before they could return to the United States. The authorities put them in prison and refused them bail, which led to an international incident between the United States and Canada. Minnesota Governor Horace Austin demanded their return when he learned that they had been refused bail, and he put the militia on full readiness. Thousands of Minnesotans volunteered for a full military invasion of Canada, but the Canadian authorities released the abductors on bail.

Gordon-Gordon believed himself safe, as grand larceny and embezzlement were not crimes serious enough to warrant extradition. However, news reached Europe of his scandal, and the jewellers whom he had robbed years before sent a representative to Canada who identified Gordon-Gordon as Lord Glencairn. Gordon-Gordon claimed that it was a smear campaign created by Gould and his associates, but the Canadian authorities considered the charges serious enough to deport him. He held a farewell party in his hotel room, where he gave expensive presents to his guests.

He then shot himself on August 1, 1874 in Headingley.
