= John Martin (businessman) =

American businessman (1820–1905)

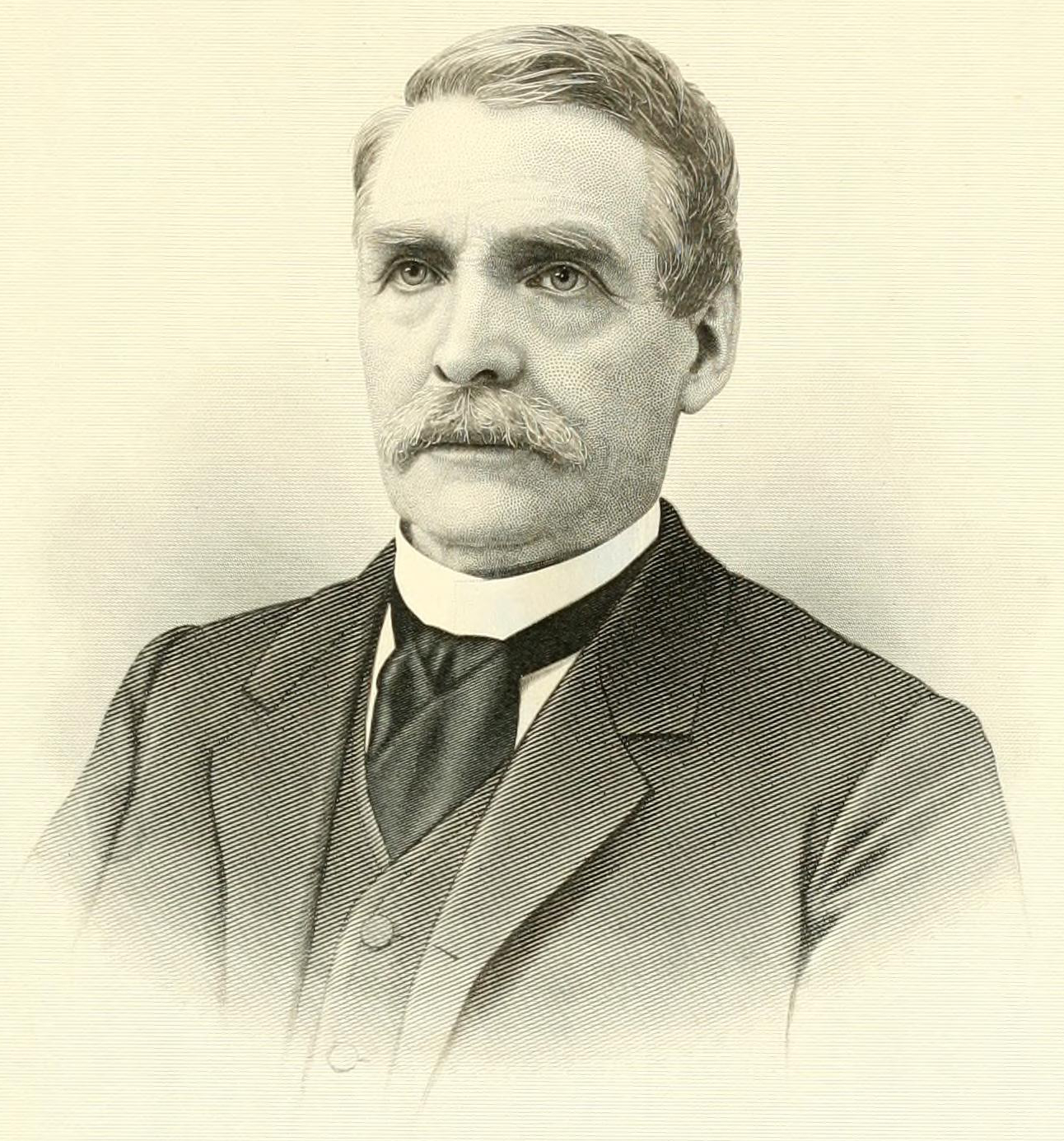
- Born: August 18, 1820; Peacham, Vermont, U.S.
- Died: May 25, 1905 (aged 84); Hennepin County, Minnesota, U.S.
- Resting place: Lakewood Cemetery
- Occupations: Steamboat captain, businessperson, lumberman, miller philanthropist
- Spouse: Jane Gillfillan (m. 1849)
- Children: Jean Martin Brown

Signature
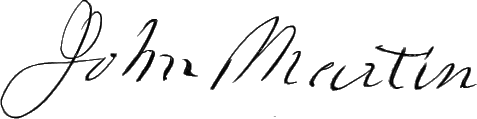

John Martin (August 18, 1820 – May 25, 1905) of Peacham, Vermont, was an American steamboat captain and businessman in Minneapolis, Minnesota involved in lumber and flour milling. In 1891, Martin led a merger of six mills to create Northwestern Consolidated Milling Company, at the time the world's second largest flour milling company after Pillsbury-Washburn.

John Martin went with his brothers during the California Gold Rush and mined successfully for one year. In 1855, in the Minnesota Territorial town of St. Anthony, John Martin was standard-bearer and leader on horseback of the ceremonial opening of the Hennepin Avenue Bridge, the first major permanent bridge across the Mississippi River.

He became President of the First National Bank, he owned the largest lumber mill in the area until it burned in 1887, and he was founding officer of Minneapolis and St. Louis Railway and Minneapolis, St. Paul and Sault Ste. Marie Railroad. In 1903, with his financial support to Children's Home Society of Minnesota, the Jean Martin Brown Receiving Home was built to provide a place where children could stay until they were adopted.

John Martin was married in 1849 to Jane B. Gilfillan sister of Minnesota Representative John Bachop Gilfillan, also from Peacham, Vermont. They had one surviving child, Jean Martin Brown (1850-1901). Her son, and sole direct descendant, was Earle Brown, noted Hennepin County Sheriff (1920), founder of the Minnesota State Patrol (1929), and Republican gubernatorial candidate for Minnesota (1932).

John Martin died at his home in Hennepin County on May 25, 1905. He and his family members are buried at Lakewood Cemetery in Minneapolis.
