= John Gilfillan =

American politician

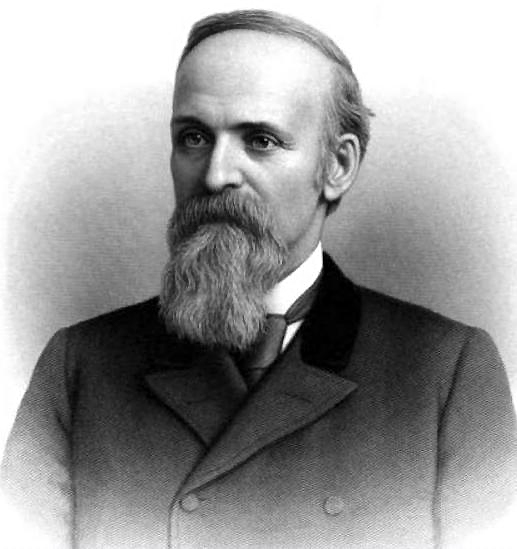

Member of the U.S. House of Representatives from Minnesota's 4th district
- In office March 4, 1885 – March 3, 1887
- Preceded by: William D. Washburn
- Succeeded by: Edmund Rice

Member of the Minnesota Senate from the 28th district
- In office January 2, 1883 – January 3, 1885
- Preceded by: John Shaleen
- Succeeded by: David Marston Clough

Member of the Minnesota Senate from the 25th district
- In office January 4, 1876 – January 1, 1883
- Preceded by: John S. Pillsbury
- Succeeded by: Albert H. Truax

Personal details
- Born: February 11, 1835 Caledonia County, Vermont, U.S.
- Died: August 19, 1924 (aged 89) Minneapolis, Minnesota, U.S.
- Resting place: Lakewood Cemetery
- Party: Republican
- Spouse: Rebecca Corse Oliphant (m. 1870; died 1884) Hannah Lavinia Coppock (m. 1893)
- Children: 4
- Profession: Attorney

John Bachop Gilfillan (February 11, 1835 – August 19, 1924) was an American politician and lawyer from Minnesota active in the late 19th century.

== Early life ==
Gilfillan was born on February 11, 1835, in Caledonia County, Vermont. He attended school at Caledonia County Grammar School, followed by Caledonia County Academy. He began teaching school at age 17. In 1855, he traveled to St. Anthony, Hennepin County, Minnesota to visit his sister, Mrs. John Martin, and decided to stay.

== Career ==
His first political position was as a member of the region's first school board. Long a proponent of education, Gilfillan drafted legislation that organized the grade school system in Minneapolis. He was admitted to the bar and began law practice in 1860. Gilfillan served four terms as the municipal attorney for St. Anthony, Minnesota. By 1863, he was the county attorney for Hennepin County. He remained in that position for 10 years, although was briefly replaced by George Robinson (from 1867 to 1869). From 1865 until 1869, Gilfillan was also a city alderman. Before seeking higher office in 1875, Gilfillan practiced law with Lochren, McNair and Gilfillan.

In 1873, Gilfillan was involved in the abduction of Lord Gordon Gordon at the behest of Jay Gould from Canada. He was arrested together with Gould, Loren Fletcher and Eugene McLanahan Wilson. They were released on bail after diplomatic pressure by Minnesota Governor Horace Austin.

Voters placed Gilfillan in his first statewide office in a special election for state senate in 1875. He served as a state senator for 10 years, first representing Minnesota's District 25 and later District 28. In 1881 he sponsored a bill to give the Chippewa citizenship and the right to vote. He left the senate in 1884 to pursue national office and was elected to the United States Congress to represent Minnesota's 4th congressional district. He served one term but was not re-elected in 1886 when St. Paul mayor Edmund Rice won. He followed that loss with extensive travel to Europe and the Middle East.

Gilfillan had been appointed a regent of the University of Minnesota by Governor John S. Pillsbury in 1880, and after serving eight years, remained in an advisory capacity. While serving in the Minnesota Senate, he was on the Committee of University Lands and was instrumental in development of the University's Agricultural Experiment Station. Gilfillan endowed the University of Minnesota with $50,000 in 1901 for student scholarships. In 1903, Gilfillan was president of the First National Bank. He continued to work with the bank as a member of its board of directors from 1905 until at least 1907.

== Personal life ==
Gilfillan was married twice. His first marriage was in Vermont to Rebecca Corse Oliphant in 1870. The couple had four surviving children, three sons and one daughter. Rebecca died in 1884. In 1893, he married Hannah Lavinia Coppock in Chicago. She survived him until 1937. Gilfillan was Republican and a member of the Minneapolis Club, the Minnesota State Bar Association, and the Westminster Presbyterian Church until his death in 1924. He was interred at Lakewood Cemetery in Minneapolis.

U.S. House of Representatives
Preceded by William D. Washburn	U.S. Representative from Minnesota's 4th congressional district 1885 – 1887	Succeeded by Edmund Rice
