= 1888 Minnesota gubernatorial election =

- November 6, 1888
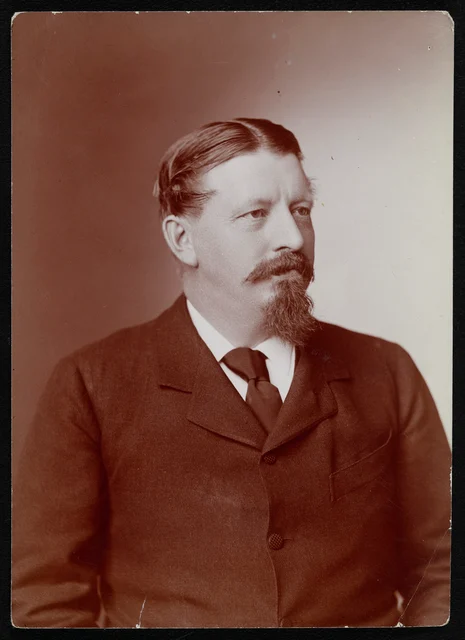

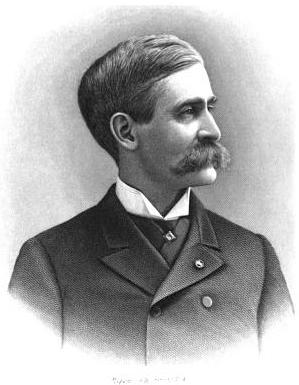

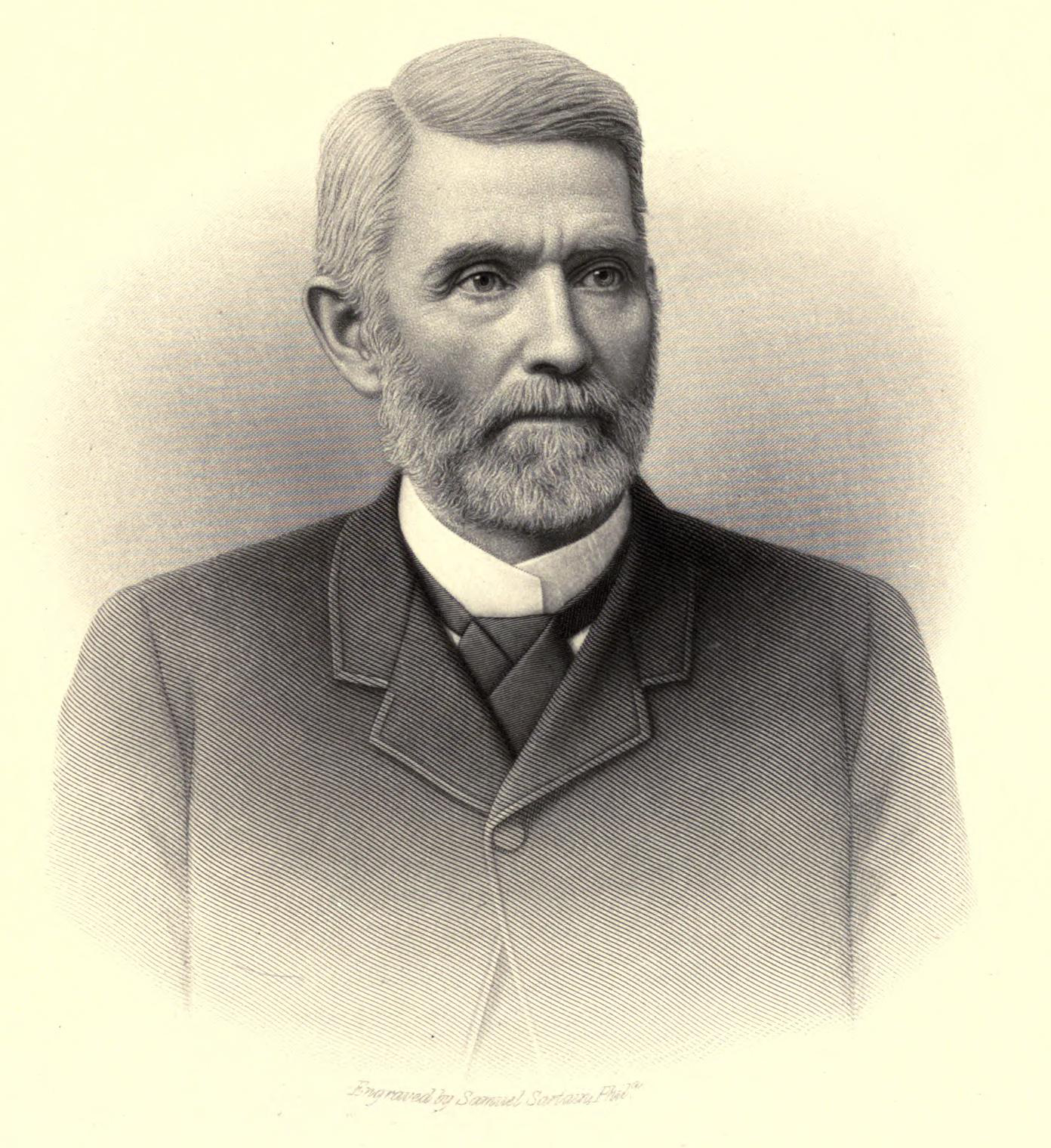
Nominee	William Rush Merriam	Eugene McLanahan Wilson	Hugh G. Harrison
Party	Republican	Democratic	Prohibition
Popular vote	134,355	110,251	17,026
Percentage	51.26%	42.07%	6.50%
- County results Merriam 40–50% 50–60% 60–70% 70−80% Wilson 40−50% 50–60% 60–70% 70−80%
Governor before election
Andrew Ryan McGill
Republican
Elected Governor
William Rush Merriam
Republican

The 1888 Minnesota gubernatorial election was held on November 6, 1888, to elect the governor of Minnesota. Incumbent Andrew Ryan McGill was not nominated for a second term. Republican William Rush Merriam was elected.

== Candidates ==
- Hugh G. Harrison, former mayor of Minneapolis
- Paul Jabez, furniture manufacturer (Union Labor)
- William Rush Merriam, Speaker of the Minnesota House of Representatives (Republican)
- Eugene McLanahan Wilson, former member of the United States House of Representatives

== Campaigns ==
Republican county conventions were held over August and September of 1888. Unlike previous elections, in which candidates were chosen by delegates from all counties assembling at one place at one time to vote, in 1888 each county met among themselves and simply published their votes to be counted.

The three primary candidates were Merriam, incumbent Andrew Ryan McGill, and Albert Scheffer. By September 1, Merriam had already won enough delegates to secure his victory in the primary. Nominee Merriam began his campaign with a party for Republican officials in his mansion on September 27, 1888.

The Democratic Party held a primary between candidates Charles Canning, and Eugene M. Wilson. Canning campaigned on the same populist platform as Ames's previous campaign in 1886, and Wilson campaigned as a conservative. Wilson was nominated. He disavowed the previously Democratic-aligned Knights of Labor. Wilson was described as "the Candidate for the Monopolistic Bosses."

== Results ==
Minnesota gubernatorial election, 1888
Party	Candidate	Votes	%
Republican	William Rush Merriam	134,355	51.26
Democratic	Eugene McLanahan Wilson	110,251	42.07
Prohibition	Hugh G. Harrison	17,026	6.50
Union Labor	Jabez Paul	385	0.15
	Write-Ins	72	0.03
Total votes		262,089	100
Republican hold			
