= James McClellan Boal =

American artist and politician

Member of the Minnesota Territorial Council
- In office September 3, 1849 – January 6, 1852
- Preceded by: Position established
- Succeeded by: William L. Larned

Member of the Minnesota Territorial House of Representatives
- In office January 7, 1852 – January 4, 1853
- Succeeded by: Alfred Elisha Ames

Personal details
- Born: c. 1811 Pennsylvania
- Died: c. 1862 Mendota, Minnesota
- Party: Whig
- Other political affiliations: Republican Party of Minnesota
- Occupation: Artist

Military service
- Allegiance: United States
- Branch/service: United States Army
- Years of service: 1833–1846

James McClellan Boal (Note: Boal's last name is often erroneously listed as "McBoal") (c. 1811–1862) was an American artist, trader, and politician who served in the Minnesota Territorial Council and House of Representatives from 1849 until 1853.

== Biography ==
Boal was born c. 1811 in Pennsylvania. He enlisted as a drummer and went to Fort Snelling. He was bunkmates with Joseph R. Brown, a fifer. He then traveled to St. Paul and established himself as a house and sign painter. He was elected as one of the first Councillors of the territory by a vote of 98 to 91. His fellow Whig partisans were apparently so happy he had won that they paraded him through the streets of the city with a chariot made from an oxcart. He served as a Councillor from 1849 until 1852 and then served as a Representative from then until early January 1853. He was also appointed as the territorial adjutant general by Governor Alexander Ramsey from 1849 until 1853.

Boal would go on to become a founding member of the Republican Party of Minnesota in 1855. He had received a letter from the Republican Territorial Committee saying that Boal "[held] the principles of the Republican Party, and [could] be relied upon as a Leading Man in [his] vicinity, to be active in forwarding the organization of the Republican movement in this Territory."

Boal moved to Mendota from Saint Paul sometime before his death in 1862. A street in Saint Paul is named after him, though it uses the erroneous spelling of his last name, McBoal.
