= 1888 Texas lieutenant gubernatorial election =

- November 6, 1888
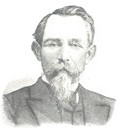

Nominee	Thomas Benton Wheeler	W. A. Moers
Party	Democratic	Union Labor
Alliance		Republican; Non-Partisan
Popular vote	250,057	87,614
Percentage	72.36%	25.35%
Lieutenant Governor before election
Thomas Benton Wheeler
Democratic
Elected Lieutenant Governor
Thomas Benton Wheeler
Democratic

The 1888 Texas lieutenant gubernatorial election was held on November 6, 1888, in order to elect the lieutenant governor of Texas. Incumbent Democratic lieutenant governor Thomas Benton Wheeler defeated Union Labor nominee W. A. Moers and Prohibition nominee Finis E. Yoakum.

== General election ==
Texas at the time was a part of the "Solid South" and the Democratic party was heavily favored in state elections, with the incumbent administration of Governor "Sul" Ross and Lieutenant Governor Thomas Wheeler proving especially popular.

Previous elections had split opposition votes between multiple smaller parties in the state including the Republican, Prohibition, and the now defunct Greenback parties. In order to attempt and consolidate the opposition votes a strategy of electoral fusion was proposed, similar to the 1882 gubernatorial campaign of independent candidate "Wash" Jones. At the top of the fusion ticket Prohibition party candidate and former lieutenant governor, Francis Marion Martin, was selected. The lieutenant governor slot was given to W. A. Moers of the newly formed Union Labor Party. Moers was an anti-prohibitionist and was selected in an attempt to balance out the ticket and attract multiple factions. However, the choice did alienate some in the Prohibition party who nominated Finis E. Yoakum instead.

On election day, November 6, 1888, Wheeler won re-election by a margin of 162,443 votes against Moers, thereby retaining Democratic control over the office of lieutenant governor. Wheeler was sworn in for his second term on January 16, 1889.

=== Candidates ===
- Thomas Benton Wheeler, incumbent (Democrat)
- W. A. Moers (Union Labor-Fusion)
- Finis E. Yoakum (Prohibition)

=== Results ===
Texas lieutenant gubernatorial election, 1888
Party	Candidate	Votes	%	±%
Democratic	Thomas Benton Wheeler (incumbent)	250,057	72.36	▼1.51
Union Labor	W. A. Moers	87,614	25.35	N/A
Prohibition	Finis E. Yoakum	7,280	2.11	▼2.79
Write-in		639	0.18	▲0.14
Total votes		345,590	100.00	
Democratic hold				
