= 1888 Liechtenstein local elections =

- February 1888

Local elections were held in Liechtenstein in February 1888 to elect the municipal councils and the mayors of the eleven municipalities.

== Results ==
=== By municipality ===
Municipality	Elected mayor
Balzers	Josef Isidor Brunhart
Eschen	Martin Öhri
Gamprin	Lorenz Kind
Mauren	Medard Ritter
Planken	Gebhard Gantner
Ruggell	Chrysostomus Büchel
Schaan	Josef Beck
Schellenberg	Meinrad Marxer
Triesen	Franz Xaver Bargetze
Triesenberg	Alois Beck
Vaduz	Alois Rheinberger
Source: Liechtensteiner Volksblatt
