= Alfred Elisha Ames =

American physician and politician

Elisha Ames
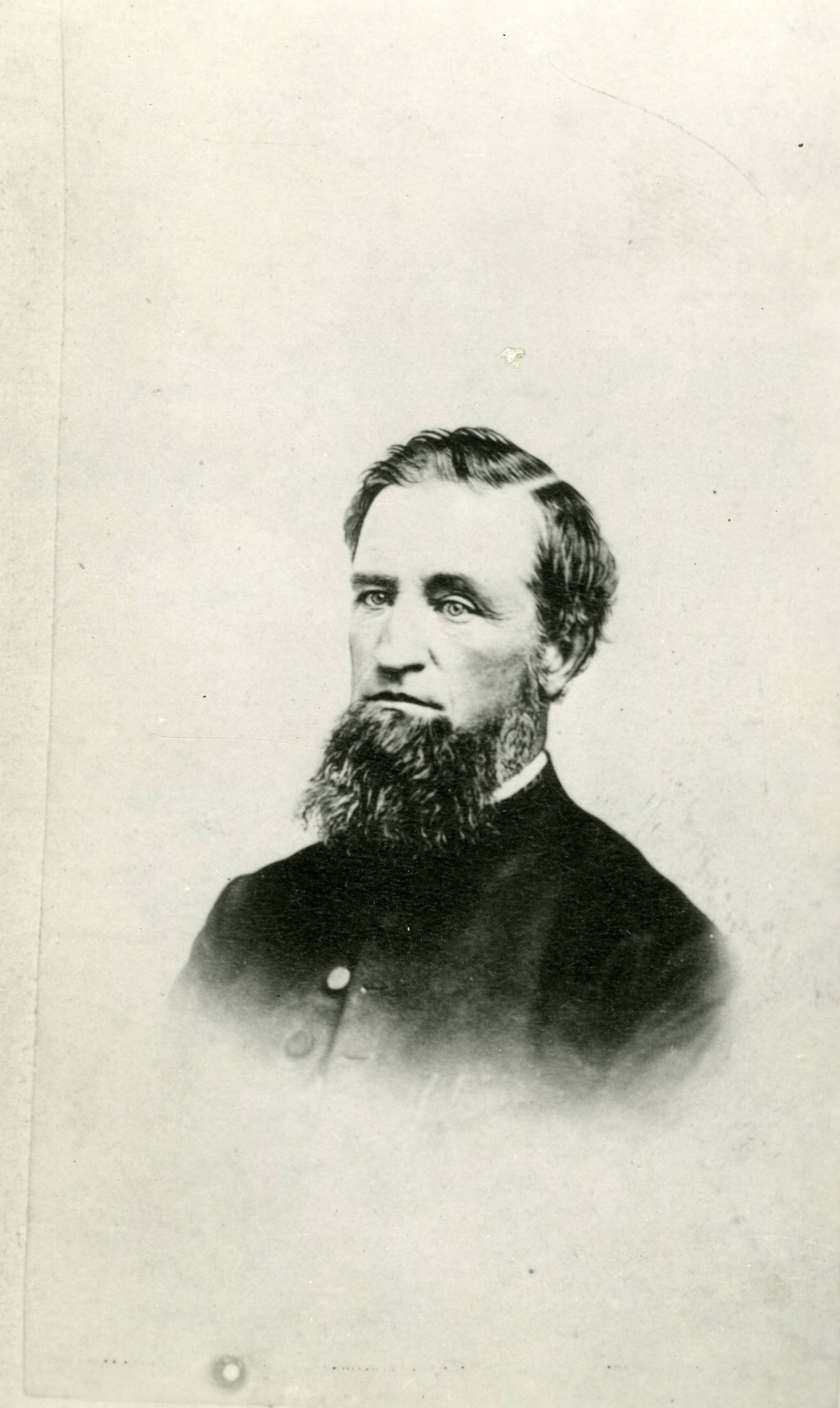
- Ames in 1862

Member of the Minnesota Territorial House of Representatives from the 6th District
- In office January 5, 1853 – January 4, 1854 Serving with Benjamin H. Randall
- Preceded by: James McClellan Boal
- Succeeded by: Hezekiah Fletcher, William H. Nobles

Member of the Illinois House of Representatives
- In office 1842–1844

Personal details
- Born: December 14, 1814 Colchester, Vermont
- Died: September 23, 1874 (aged 59)
- Party: Democratic
- Relatives: Eli B. Ames (brother); A. A. Ames (son)
- Occupation: Physician and Politician.

Alfred Elisha Ames (December 14, 1814 – September 23, 1874) was an American medical doctor and politician.

Born in Colchester, Vermont, he moved to Orwell, Ohio, in 1831. In 1836, he moved to Chicago, Illinois. He then moved to Vandalia, Illinois, where he served as deputy Secretary of State of Illinois and as private secretary to the Governor of Illinois. In 1839, he moved to Springfield, Illinois where he served in the same positions and clerk of the Illinois House of Representatives. He served as a state representative representing Boone County in the 13th Illinois General Assembly.

He lived in Belvedere and Roscoe, Illinois. In 1845, Ames graduated from Rush Medical College. He served in the Illinois House of Representatives and then in the Illinois State Senate. He also served as probate judge and postmaster of Roscoe, Illinois. In 1851, he moved to Minnesota Territory and settled in what is now Minneapolis, Minnesota. In 1853, Ames served in the Minnesota Territorial House of Representatives. In 1857, he served in the first Minnesota Constitutional Convention of 1857 as a Democrat. He practiced medicine in Minneapolis until his death in 1874. His son was A.A. Ames who was also a physician and mayor of Minneapolis. Ames also served as the first Masonic Grand Master for the Grand Lodge of Minnesota from 1853-1855 His brother was Eli B. Ames.
