= 1888 Missouri lieutenant gubernatorial election =

- November 6, 1888

Nominee	Stephen Hugh Claycomb	G. H. Wallace
Party	Democratic	Republican
Popular vote	261,737	238,634
Percentage	51.47%	46.93%
Lieutenant Governor before election
Albert P. Morehouse
Democratic
Elected Lieutenant Governor
Stephen Hugh Claycomb
Democratic

The 1888 Missouri lieutenant gubernatorial election was held on November 6, 1888, in order to elect the lieutenant governor of Missouri. Democratic nominee Stephen Hugh Claycomb defeated Republican nominee G. H. Wallace, Prohibition nominee William C. Wilson and Union Labor nominee J. C. Seabourn.

== General election ==
On election day, November 6, 1888, Democratic nominee Stephen Hugh Claycomb won the election by a margin of 23,103 votes against his foremost opponent Republican nominee G. H. Wallace, thereby retaining Democratic control over the office of lieutenant governor. Claycomb was sworn in as the 21st lieutenant governor of Missouri on January 14, 1889.

=== Results ===
Missouri lieutenant gubernatorial election, 1888
Party	Candidate	Votes	%
Democratic	Stephen Hugh Claycomb	261,737	51.47
Republican	G. H. Wallace	238,634	46.93
Prohibition	William C. Wilson	4,672	0.92
Union Labor	J. C. Seabourn	3,446	0.68
Total votes		508,489	100.00
Democratic hold			

== See also ==
- 1888 Missouri gubernatorial election
