= George A. Brackett =

American politician and businessman (1836–1921)

George Augustus Brackett
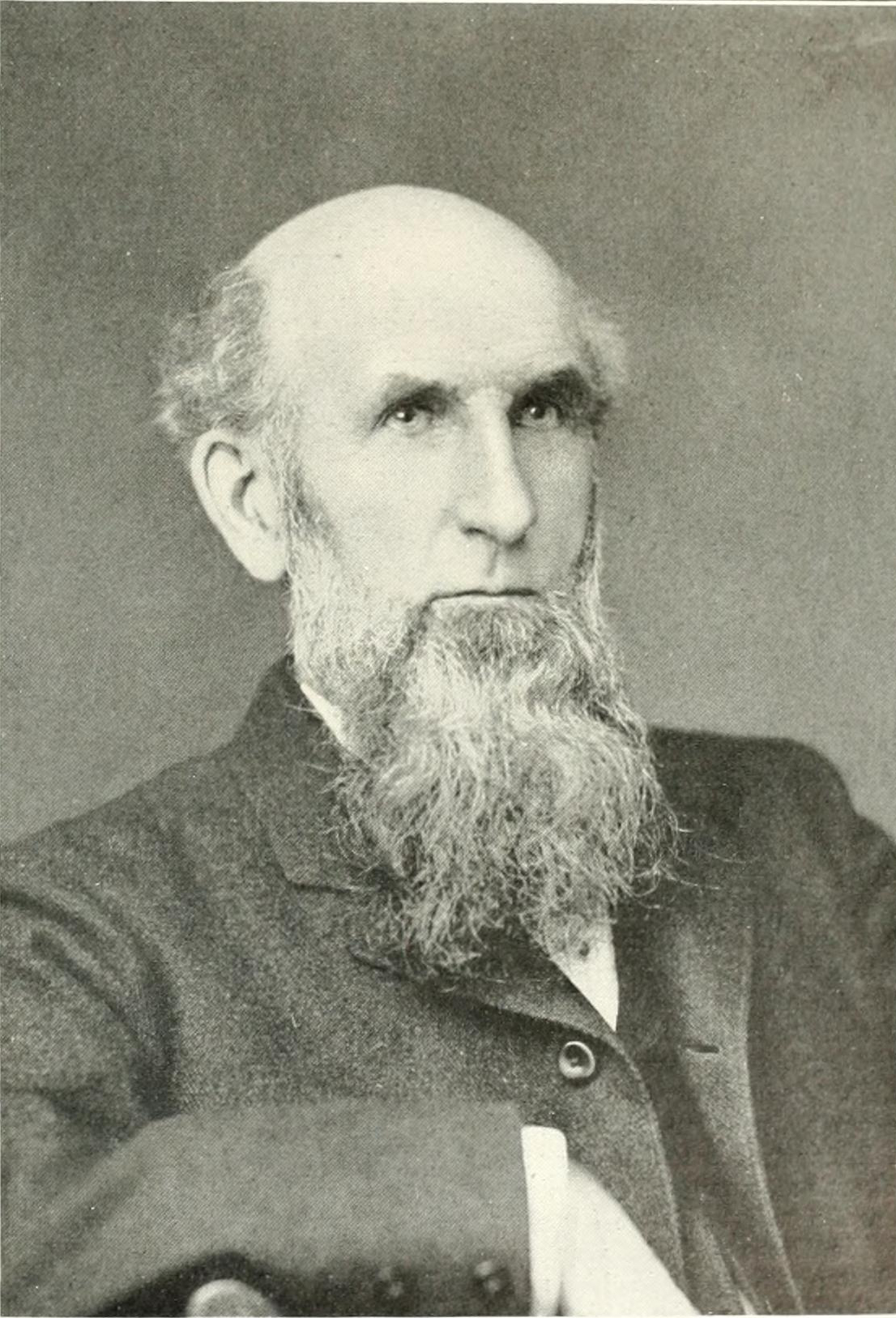
- Brackett c. 1908

6th Mayor of Minneapolis
- In office April 8, 1873 – April 14, 1874
- Preceded by: Eugene McLanahan Wilson
- Succeeded by: Eugene McLanahan Wilson

Personal details
- Born: September 16, 1836 Calais, Maine, U.S.
- Died: May 17, 1921 (aged 84) Minneapolis, Minnesota, U.S.
- Resting place: Lakewood Cemetery
- Party: Republican
- Spouse: Anna M. Hoit
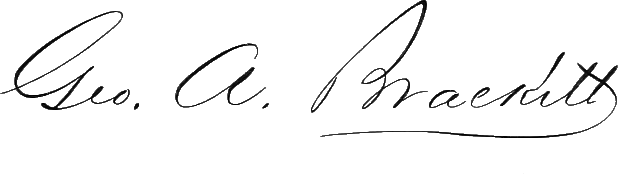
- Signature

George Augustus Brackett (September 16, 1836 – May 17, 1921) was a businessman and Republican politician who served as the sixth mayor of Minneapolis. He was also involved in the development of the White Pass wagon road during the Klondike Gold Rush.

== Early life and career ==
Brackett was born in Calais, Maine on September 16, 1836, to Henry H. Brackett and Mary S. Prescott. He attended the local schools and at the age of 20 decided to move west, eventually settling in St. Anthony, Minnesota (along with his acquaintance and fellow Mainer William D. Washburn). He found work with a butcher and eventually ran his own meat company. During the Dakota War of 1862 he received the contract to supply beef to Minnesotan troops. After a unit he was traveling with was attacked he was separated from them and forced to travel alone for five days to reconnect with them.

After the war, Brackett moved into the city's rapidly growing milling industry and worked in partnership with William W. Eastman, William S. Judd and Willam D. Washburn. In 1869 he was contracted by J. Gregory Smith to supply and organize transportation for a scouting expedition for the Northern Pacific Railroad. He supported a second expedition in 1870 which built the railroad's first segment from Carlton, Minnesota to Fargo, North Dakota. For the next decade Brackett had a successful career as a contractor for railroad construction. In addition to the Northern Pacific he also performed work for the Great Northern Railway (U.S.) and the Canadian Pacific Railway. He also continued to remain active in a variety of other industries including meat packing, milling, construction and real estate. The 1888 Minneapolis City Directory noted his name and occupation as "George Brackett, Capitalist."

Brackett became involved in the politics of Minneapolis from its inception: he served as one of the city's first aldermen when the city was formed. In 1873 he was elected mayor of Minneapolis and served a single one-year term. In 1873 he was also involved in The Lord Gordon Affair; he was induced to send his chief of police to Manitoba to arrest Gordon, and finally went himself to assist his chief. There, along with Jay Gould, Loren Fletcher, John Gilfillan, and Eugene McLanahan Wilson, Brackett was arrested by Canadian authorities for kidnapping, sparking an international incident between the U.S. and Canada. He and the rest of Gould's associates were eventually released on bail.

Brackett unsuccessfully ran for re-election in 1874 and 1876. By one account Brackett led such an extensive campaign against vice in the city that "the city was unable to live up to its opportunities thus offered" and opted to elect a less passionate mayor. He also served as the chief of the Minneapolis Fire Department for a number of years as well as on the Minneapolis Park Board where he was instrumental in purchasing and preserving Minnehaha Park. Brackett was also a major force behind some of the early city's civic events including the 1886 Industrial Exposition, the 1891 Harvest Festival, and the 1892 Republican National Convention.

During the late 1880s and 1890s, Brackett faced a number of personal and financial setbacks. A building he owned in Minneapolis collapsed during a remodeling project, killing 4 workers and costing Brackett a significant amount of money to rehabilitate. A vacation home of his on Lake Minnetonka was destroyed by a tornado. In 1890 his wife Anna died. The downturn of the Panic of 1893 also drained his finances and forced him to turn to personal loans and mortgaging his properties to remain afloat. By 1897 he had left his various business interests and was semi-retired.

== White Pass wagon road ==
In August 1897, Brackett left for Vancouver, British Columbia, Canada with his son James to explore the business of supplying prospectors involved in the Yukon Gold Rush. En route he met Joseph H. Acklen, a lawyer and former congressman, who expressed an interest in developing a reliable road from either Skagway or Dyea into the Yukon Territory. The two were later joined by engineer Norman Smith and formed the Skagway and Yukon Transportation and Improvement Company, backed by a small group of investors and shareholders. The group opted to use the White Pass leading from Skagway and named Brackett the general superintendent. Construction began in November 1897.

While Brackett begun work, the company backing the project faced turmoil from in-fighting and difficulties finding investors. Acklen was eventually forced out by several of the project's backers. After they too had difficulties finding investors they abandoned the company. After the company's president threatened to order a halt to any more work, Brackett bought him out and became the president himself. Construction gradually progressed, however the company's financial situation remained precarious. Only a few of Brackett's personal friends (including railroad barons James J. Hill and William Cornelius Van Horne) and some Seattle-based investors kept the project alive.

In March 1898 the partially completed road was opened and Brackett began collecting tolls from those who used it. He had hoped to convert the road into a more lucrative railroad, however the Canadian government had already chartered a railroad using a different route. Brackett eventually formed a deal to lease access on his road to the railroad for moving construction equipment and supplies. While it was still used on a limited basis by prospectors in late 1898 and 1899 it was left largely unused and abandoned after that.

== Later life and death ==
After the end of the White Pass wagon road, Brackett and his sons invested in a mining operation near Atlin Lake, British Columbia. In 1905 he returned to Minneapolis and lived a quiet retired life at his lake home in Orono, Minnesota. He died in 1921. He is buried at Lakewood Cemetery.

Brackett Field Park in Minneapolis is named in his honor.

== Electoral history ==
- Minneapolis Mayoral Election, 1873
  - George Augustus Brackett 2,188
  - Eli B. Ames 1,362
- Minneapolis Mayoral Election, 1874
  - Eugene McLanahan Wilson 2,533
  - George Augustus Brackett 2,147
  - John H. Thompson 415
- Minneapolis Mayoral Election, 1876
  - Albert Alonzo Ames 2,842
  - George Augustus Brackett 2,515
  - Write-Ins and Scattering 51

Political offices
Preceded by Eugene McLanahan Wilson	Mayor of Minneapolis; 1873 – 1874	Succeeded by Eugene McLanahan Wilson
