= 1888 Illinois lieutenant gubernatorial election =

- November 6, 1888
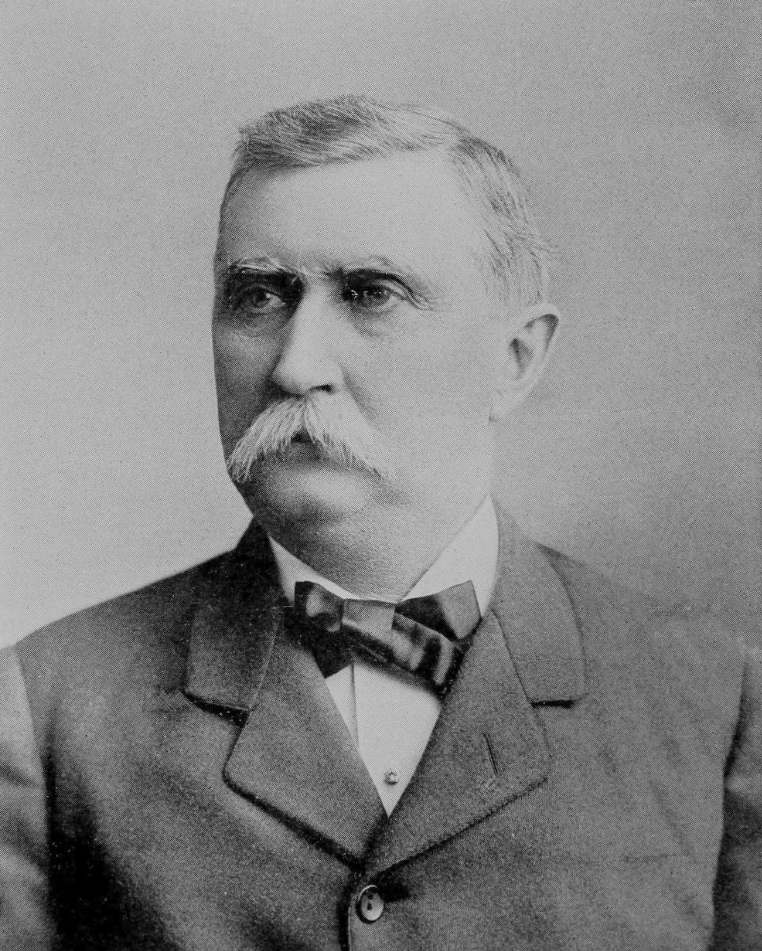

Nominee	Lyman Beecher Ray	Andrew Jackson Bell
Party	Republican	Democratic
Popular vote	371,170	348,221
Percentage	49.89%	46.81%
Lieutenant Governor before election
John Corson Smith
Republican
Elected Lieutenant Governor
Lyman Beecher Ray
Republican

The 1888 Illinois lieutenant gubernatorial election was held on 6 November 1888 in order to elect the Lieutenant Governor of Illinois. Republican nominee Lyman Beecher Ray defeated Democratic nominee Andrew Jackson Bell and two other third party candidates.

== Results ==
Illinois lieutenant gubernatorial election, 1888
Party	Candidate	Votes	%
Republican	Lyman Beecher Ray	371,170	49.89
Democratic	Andrew Jackson Bell	348,221	46.81
Prohibition	Joseph L. Whitlock	17,022	2.29
Union Labor	John M. Foley	7,535	1.01

== See also ==
- 1888 Illinois gubernatorial election
