= 1888 Wisconsin lieutenant gubernatorial election =

- November 6, 1888
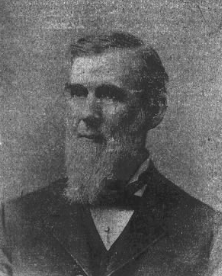

Nominee	George Washington Ryland	Andrew Kull
Party	Republican	Democratic
Popular vote	176,488	154,735
Percentage	49.78%	43.64%
Lieutenant Governor before election
George Washington Ryland
Republican
Elected Lieutenant Governor
George Washington Ryland
Republican

The 1888 Wisconsin lieutenant gubernatorial election was held on November 6, 1888, in order to elect the lieutenant governor of Wisconsin. Incumbent Republican lieutenant governor George Washington Ryland defeated Democratic nominee Andrew Kull, Prohibition nominee Chris Carlson and Union Labor nominee Nelson E. Allen.

== General election ==
On election day, November 6, 1888, incumbent Republican lieutenant governor George Washington Ryland won re-election by a margin of 21,753 votes against his foremost opponent Democratic nominee Andrew Kull, thereby retaining Republican control over the office of lieutenant governor. Ryland was sworn in for his second term on January 7, 1889.

=== Results ===
Wisconsin lieutenant gubernatorial election, 1888
Party	Candidate	Votes	%
Republican	George Washington Ryland (incumbent)	176,488	49.78
Democratic	Andrew Kull	154,735	43.64
Prohibition	Chris Carlson	14,533	4.10
Union Labor	Nelson E. Allen	8,763	2.47
	Scattering	46	0.01
Total votes		354,565	100.00
Republican hold			
