= J. Edward Hall =

American politician

James Edward Hall (August 22, 1851 – May 3, 1889) was a socialist trade union organizer and politician. He is best remembered as one of the organizers of the New York Central Labor Union and one of the first American socialists nominated for high political office, heading the New York state ticket of the Socialist Labor Party of America as its candidate for Governor in 1888.

== Biography ==
=== Early years ===
J. Edward Hall was born August 22, 1851, in Glen Cove which was then a village in Queens County, and is now a city in Nassau County on Long Island. He attended the common schools, and became a machinist by trade.

Hall helped to organized the national trade district of the Machinery Constructors union and was the secretary of that organization through 1888. He was also one of the organizers of the Central Labor Union of New York in 1882.

=== Political career ===
Hall was an early member of the American Section (i.e. English-speaking branch) of the Socialist Labor Party of America (SLP).

In the 1887 state election, Hall was nominated as the candidate of the Progressive Labor Party for Secretary of State after the previous nominee John Swinton declined and ran for the State Senate's 7th district election instead. In 1888, the Socialist Labor Party chose to run a state ticket under its own name for the first time and Hall was selected to head the ticket as candidate for Governor of New York, and polled 3,348 votes (about 0.25% of the total).

Although ill with the disease that would soon take his life, in the spring of 1889 Hall issued the call to establish the Nationalist Club of New York, "nationalism" being synonymous with nationalization/public ownership at that time. This organization drew the participation of Columbia University lecturer Daniel DeLeon, later a top leader of the SLP. Although too ill to attend its inaugural meeting, held Sunday, April 7, 1889, "a vote of thanks...for his untiring efforts in behalf of Nationalism," was passed by the meeting and an organization of more than 100 members immediately emerged.

=== Death and legacy ===
Hall died of tuberculosis at his residence at 1911 Third Avenue, on May 3, 1889. He left a widow and four children. His funeral was attended by hundreds of socialists from around New York and a parade of 500 escorted the carriage bearing the coffin to the ferry at Astoria, New York, from which the remains were taken to the crematory at Fresh Pond, Long Island.

== Works ==
- The Place of Individualism in the Socialist System. New York: New York Labor News Co., 1888.
- "Standard Sophistries," Workmen's Advocate [New York], November 17, 1888.
- "The 'Press' Parrot," Workmen's Advocate [New York], November 17, 1888.
