= 1888 Georgia gubernatorial election =

- October 3, 1888
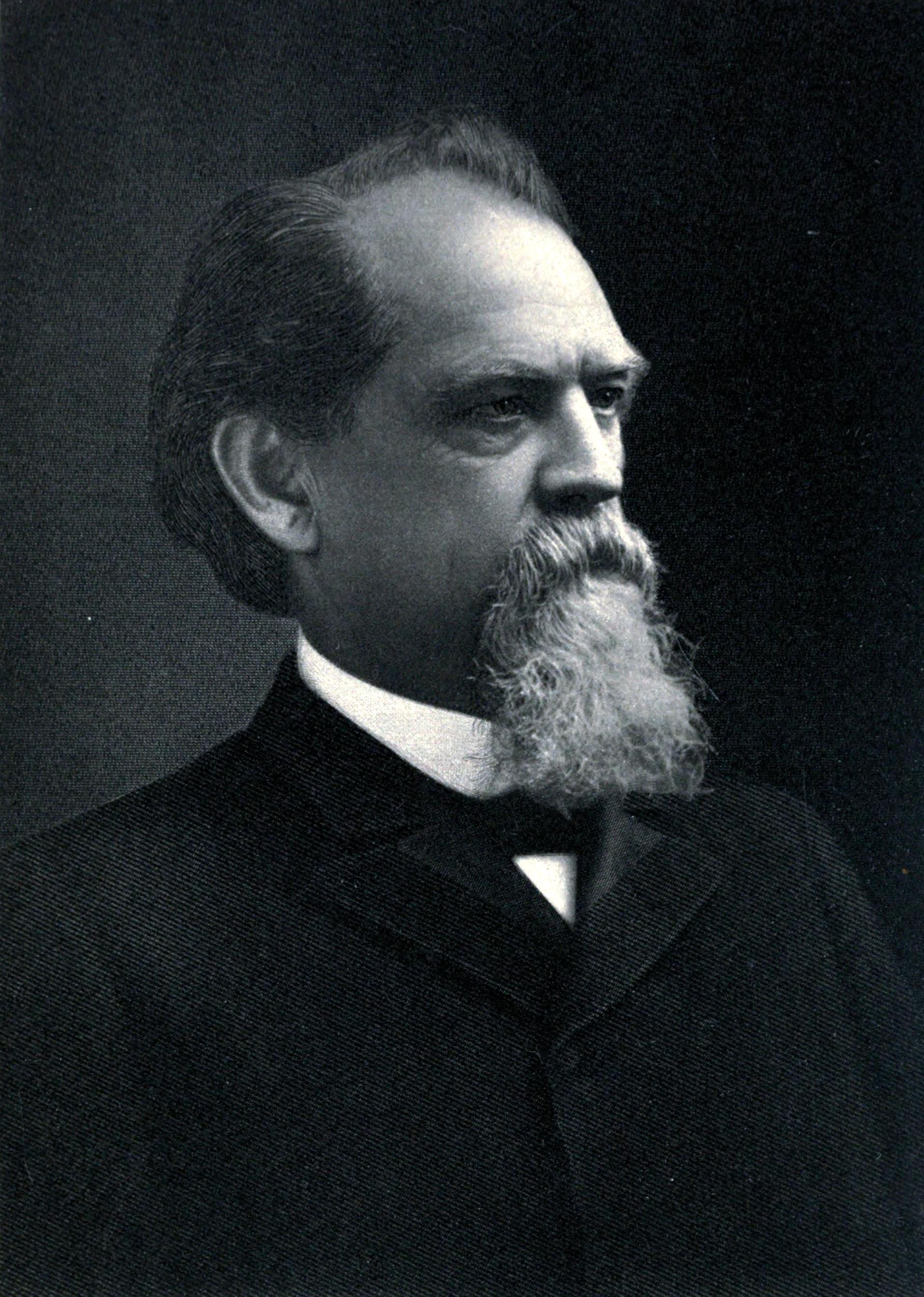
Nominee	John B. Gordon
Party	Democratic
Popular vote	121,999
Percentage	100.00%
- Results by County: Gordon: >90%
Governor before election
John B. Gordon
Democratic
Elected Governor
John B. Gordon
Democratic

The 1888 Georgia gubernatorial election was held on October 3, 1888, in order to elect the Governor of Georgia. Democratic nominee and incumbent Governor John B. Gordon ran unopposed and thus won re-election.

== General election ==
On election day, October 3, 1888, Democratic nominee John B. Gordon won re-election with 100.00% of the vote, thereby holding Democratic control over the office of Governor. Gordon was sworn in for his second term on November 30, 1888.

=== Results ===
Georgia gubernatorial election, 1888
Party	Candidate	Votes	%
Democratic	John B. Gordon (incumbent)	121,999	100.00
Total votes		121,999	100.00
Democratic hold			
