= 1888 Illinois gubernatorial election =

- November 6, 1888
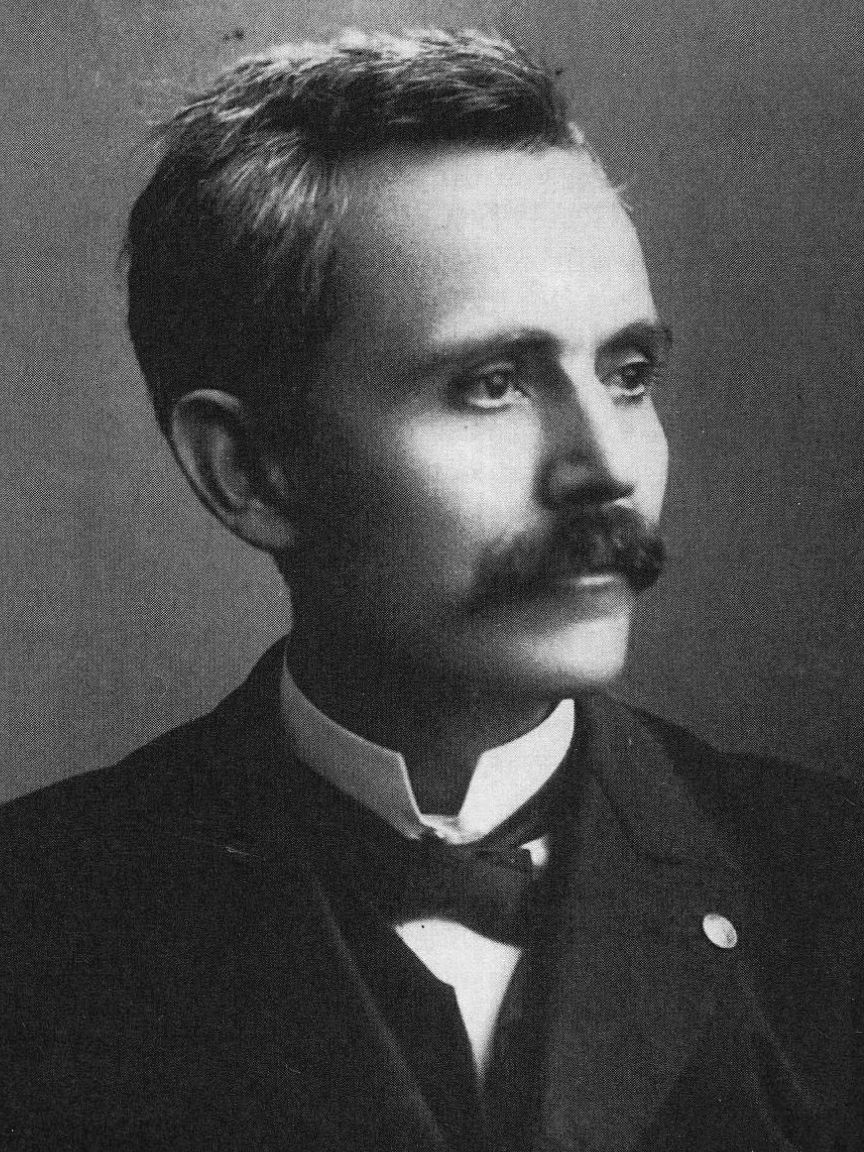

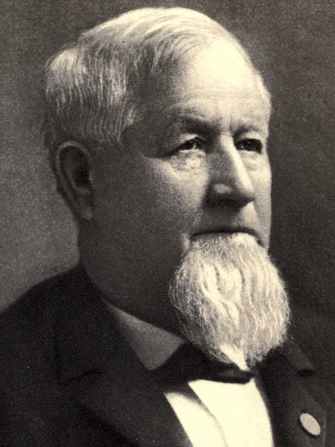
Nominee	Joseph W. Fifer	John M. Palmer
Party	Republican	Democratic
Popular vote	367,860	355,313
Percentage	49.15%	47.47%
- County results Fifer: 40–50% 50–60% 60–70% 70–80% Palmer: 40–50% 50–60% 60–70%
Governor before election
Richard J. Oglesby
Republican
Elected Governor
Joseph W. Fifer
Republican

The 1888 Illinois gubernatorial election was held on November 6, 1888. Republican Joseph W. Fifer defeated Democratic nominee John M. Palmer with 49.15 percent of the vote. This was the ninth consecutive victory for the Republican Party since 1856.

== Republican nomination ==
=== Candidates ===
- Clark E. Carr, candidate for governor in 1880
- James A. Connolly, former state representative and U.S. attorney for the Southern District of Illinois
- Joseph W. Fifer, former state senator from Bloomington
- John McNulta, former U.S. representative from Bloomington
- Richard J. Oglesby, incumbent governor of Illinois (not formally nominated)
- John I. Rinaker, chairman of the Illinois board of railroad and warehouse commissioners
- John C. Smith, incumbent lieutenant governor of Illinois
- Francis Marion Wright, Urbana attorney

=== Results ===
The Republican state convention was held on May 2, 1888, at Springfield. The results of the balloting were as follows:

1888 Republican Illinois convention
Ballot	1st	2nd	3rd	4th
Joseph W. Fifer	288	349	398	606
John McNulta	136	133	144	111
Clark E. Carr	115	110	97	9
James A. Connolly	100	96	89	58
John I. Rinaker	98	77	62	32
John C. Smith	58	45	36	17
Francis M. Wright	48	33	21	14
Richard J. Oglesby	4	4	0	0

Fifer's nomination was then made unanimous.

== Democratic nomination ==
=== Candidates ===
- John M. Palmer, former Republican governor of Illinois
- William A. J. Sparks, former commissioner of the U.S. General Land Office
- Adlai Stevenson I, first assistant United States postmaster general
- Murray F. Tuley, judge of the Circuit Court of Cook County and former Chicago alderman

=== Results ===
The Democratic state convention was held on May 23, 1888, at Springfield.

Democratic gubernatorial nomination, 1st ballot, May 23, 1888
Party	Candidate	Votes	%
Democratic	John M. Palmer	567	72.78
Democratic	William A. J. Sparks	210	26.96
Democratic	Adlai Stevenson I	1	0.13
Democratic	Murray F. Tuley	1	0.13
Total votes		779	100.00

Palmer's nomination was then made unanimous.

== General election ==
=== Candidates ===
- Joseph W. Fifer, former state senator from Bloomington (Republican)
- David H. Harts, nominee for U.S. representative in 1882 (Prohibition)
- Willis W. Jones (Union Labor)
- John M. Palmer, former Republican governor of Illinois (Democratic)

=== Results ===
Illinois gubernatorial election, 1888
Party	Candidate	Votes	%	±%
Republican	Joseph W. Fifer	367,860	49.15%	
Democratic	John M. Palmer	355,313	47.47%	
Prohibition	David H. Harts	18,874	2.52%	
Union Labor Party	Willis W. Jones	6,394	0.85%	
Scattering		6	0.00%	
Majority		12,547	1.68%	
Turnout		748,447		
Republican hold		Swing		

== See also ==
- 1888 Illinois lieutenant gubernatorial election

== Bibliography ==
- Compiled and Printed by the Secretary of State (1889). Official vote of the State of Illinois cast at the General Election held November 6, 1888. Springfield, Ill.: H. W. Rokker, State Printer and Binder.
