= 1888 New York state election =

1888 New York gubernatorial election
- November 6, 1888
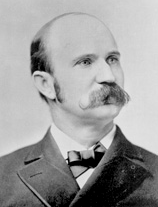

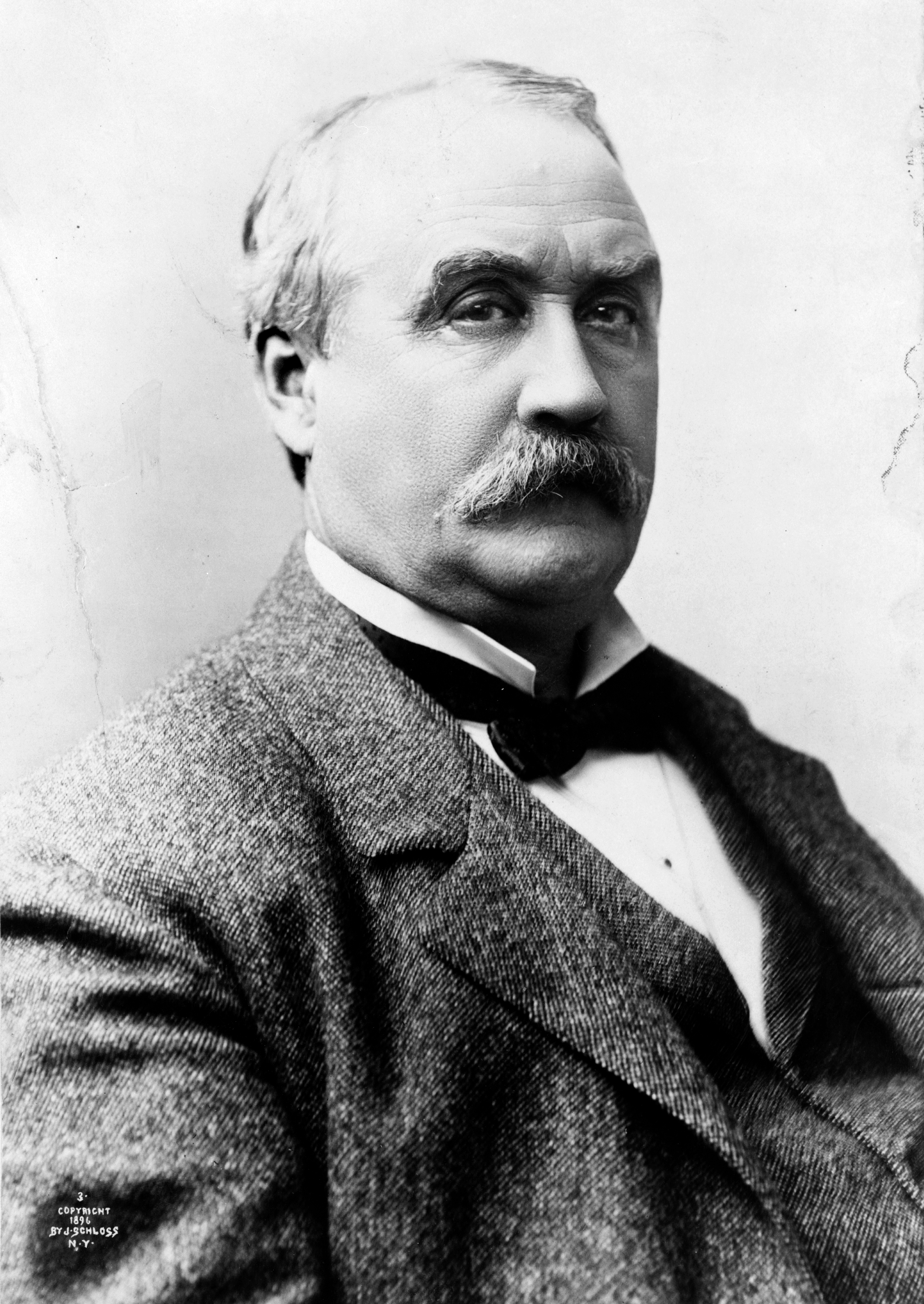
Nominee	David B. Hill	Warner Miller
Party	Democratic	Republican
Alliance		United Labor
Popular vote	650,464	631,283
Percentage	49.45%	47.99%
- County results Hill: 40–50% 50–60% 60–70% Miller: 40–50% 50–60% 60–70% No Data
Governor before election
David B. Hill
Democratic
Elected Governor
David B. Hill
Democratic

The 1888 New York state election was held on November 6, 1888, to elect the governor, the lieutenant governor and a judge of the New York Court of Appeals, as well as all members of the New York State Assembly.

== History ==
The Prohibition state convention met on June 26 at the Alhambra Rink in Syracuse, New York. Frank E. Baldwin, of Chemung County, was temporary chairman until the choice of W. Martin Jones as president. The convention re-assembled on June 27. W. Martin Jones was nominated after the second ballot (first ballot: W. Jennings Demorest 398, Benson J. Lossing 389, Jones 249, Guy C. Humphreys 26; second ballot: Lossing 466, Jones 417, Demorest 178). George Powell for lieutenant governor; and Charles W. Stevens, of Steuben County, for the Court of Appeals, were nominated by acclamation.

The Republican state convention met on August 28 at the Skating Rink in Saratoga Springs, New York. Benjamin F. Tracy was temporary chairman until the choice of Gen. George S. Batcheller as president. Warner Miller was nominated for governor by acclamation. Stephen V. R. Cruger was nominated for lieutenant governor on the first ballot (vote: Cruger 409, John B. Weber 180, Cornelius R. Parsons 72, Norman M. Allen 32). William Rumsey was nominated for the Court of Appeals by acclamation.

The Democratic state convention met on September 12 at Buffalo, New York. George Raines was temporary chairman until the choice of D. Cady Herrick as president. The incumbents, Governor David B. Hill, Lieutenant Governor Edward F. Jones and Judge John Clinton Gray, were re-nominated by acclamation.

The United Labor state convention met on September 20. The convention endorsed, with a vote of 124 to 103, the Republican candidate for governor, Warner Miller, because his party was "committed to ballot reform." Then the convention voted 131 to 67 to nominate a separate ticket, and John H. Blakeney was nominated for Lieutenant Governor and Lawrence J. McParlin for the Court of Appeals.

The Socialist Labor state convention met on October 21 at the Labor Lyceum in New York City. J. Edward Hall was nominated for governor, Christian Pattberg, of Brooklyn for lieutenant governor, and Dr. Frank Gereau, of New York City for Judge of the Court of Appeals.

== Result ==
The whole Democratic ticket was elected.

The incumbents Hill, Jones and Gray were re-elected.

1888 state election results
Office	Democratic ticket		Republican ticket		Prohibition ticket		Socialist Labor ticket		United Labor ticket	
Governor	David B. Hill	650,464	Warner Miller	631,283	W. Martin Jones	30,215	J. Edward Hall	3,348	Warner Miller	
Lieutenant Governor	Edward F. Jones	650,748	Stephen V. R. Cruger	628,486	George Powell	30,288	Christian Pattberg	3,049	John H. Blakeney	3,010
Judge of the Court of Appeals	John Clinton Gray	634,875	William Rumsey	631,409	Charles W. Stevens	31,178	Francis Gerau	3,523	Lawrence J. McParlin	3,841

== See also ==
- New York gubernatorial elections

== Sources ==
- The tickets: THE NATIONAL, STATE, CITY, AND COUNTY NOMINATIONS in NYT on November 4, 1888 [contains a few erroneous spellings]
- THE NOVEMBER ELECTIONS, recalling previous result in 1888; in NYT on October 27, 1891
- Result in New York City: THE VOTE OF THE CITY in NYT on November 21, 1888
- Results OFFICIAL VOTE OF NEW-YORK STATE FOR CANDIDATES VOTED FOR ON TUESDAY, NOVEMBER 6, 1888 in NYT on November 24, 1888
- Result: The Tribune Almanac 1889
