= Andrew Ryan McGill =

American politician

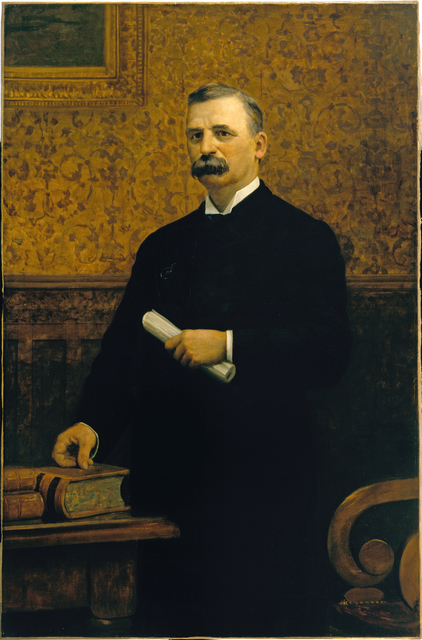

10th Governor of Minnesota
- In office January 5, 1887 – January 9, 1889
- Lieutenant: Albert E. Rice
- Preceded by: Lucius Frederick Hubbard
- Succeeded by: William Rush Merriam

Personal details
- Born: February 19, 1840 Saegertown, Pennsylvania, U.S.
- Died: October 31, 1905 (aged 65) St. Paul, Minnesota, U.S.
- Resting place: Oakland Cemetery, Saint Paul, Minnesota
- Party: Republican
- Spouse(s): Eliza Bryant (1st), Mary Elizabeth Wilson (2nd)

Military service
- Years of service: 1862-1863
- Rank: First Sergeant
- Unit: Company D, 9th Minnesota Infantry Regiment
- Battles/wars: American Civil War

Andrew Ryan McGill (February 19, 1840 – October 31, 1905) was an American politician of the United States Republican Party. He served as the tenth governor of Minnesota from January 5, 1887, to January 9, 1889.

== Family ==
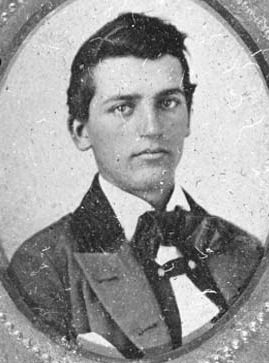
Andrew Ryan McGill, c. 1858

Andrew Ryan McGill, the son of Angeline (née Martin) and Charles McGill, was born in Saegertown, Pennsylvania, on February 19, 1840. Andrew's father, Charles Dillon McGill (1802–1875), was the youngest son of Patrick (1762–1832) and Anna (née Baird) McGill. Patrick had emigrated from County Antrim, Ireland, about 1774, settling in Northumberland, Pennsylvania. In 1795 Patrick and Anna moved their family to the western part of Pennsylvania, homesteading several hundred acres in Crawford County. Andrew's mother, Angeline Martin (1811–1849), was the eldest of Armand (1785–1861) and Mary (née Ryan, 1789–1866) Martin's nine children. The Martin family also owned land in western Pennsylvania. Armand's brother, Lieutenant General Charles Martin, who commanded troops stationed at Fort de Boueff (Watertown, Pennsylvania) in the late 1790s, settled in Carlisle, Pennsylvania.

McGill married Eliza E. Bryant (d. 1877), daughter of Charles S. Bryant, a lawyer and author from St. Peter, Minnesota. Together they had three children: Charles Herbert (b. 1866), Robert C. (b. 1869), and Lida B. (b. 1874). In 1879, two years after Eliza's death, Andrew married Mary E. Wilson, daughter of Margaret Maleena (née Stone) and Joseph Carlton Wilson, a prominent physician of Edinboro, Pennsylvania. Mary and Andrew had two children: Wilson (b. 1884) and Thomas (b. 1889).

== Early career ==
In 1859, at the age of nineteen, Andrew Ryan McGill moved from Pennsylvania to Kentucky to become a schoolteacher. When the Civil War began and teaching, work was no longer feasible in Kentucky, McGill left for Minnesota, arriving June 10, 1861. He became principal of the public school in St. Peter, Minnesota, in August 1862. In that same year, at the age of 22, McGill enlisted in Company D of the 9th Minnesota Infantry Regiment and served as the company's First Sergeant. On August 18, 1863 he was discharged for disability following the Battle of Tupelo. Soon after his discharge he was elected county superintendent of public schools (Nicollet County, Minnesota), a position he filled for two terms. From 1865 through 1866 McGill was the editor and proprietor of the St. Peter Tribune. In 1865 he was also elected clerk of the district court of Nicollet County for a term of four years. McGill took the opportunity to study law under Judge Horace Austin and was admitted to the bar in 1869.

== Political career ==
In 1870 Austin was elected governor of Minnesota and McGill was selected as his private secretary. In 1873, McGill was appointed insurance commissioner of the state, a position he held for thirteen years. In 1881, he was an unsuccessful candidate for the Republican nomination for governor of Minnesota.

In 1886, the Republican state convention nominated McGill as their candidate for Governor. He won the nomination and the election, serving a single, two-year term as governor (1887–1889). During his term he recommended a revision of the railroad laws pertaining to transportation, storage, and grading of wheat, the watering of railroad stocks, a simplification of the tax laws, regulation of liquor, abolition of contract prison labor, establishment of a soldiers' home, and creation of a Bureau of Labor Statistics. While not re-elected, McGill remained active in politics, supporting the presidential candidacy of Cushman K. Davis (1896) and serving in the Minnesota State Senate from the 37th District, St. Paul (1899–1905). McGill was appointed postmaster of St. Paul (1900) while concurrently serving as senator.

He died at his home in St. Paul on October 31, 1905.

Party political offices
Preceded by Lucius Frederick Hubbard	Republican nominee for Governor of Minnesota; 1886	Succeeded by William Rush Merriam
Political offices
Preceded by Lucius Frederick Hubbard	Governor of Minnesota; 1887 – 1889	Succeeded by William Rush Merriam
