= Eugene M. Wilson =

American politician (1833–1890)

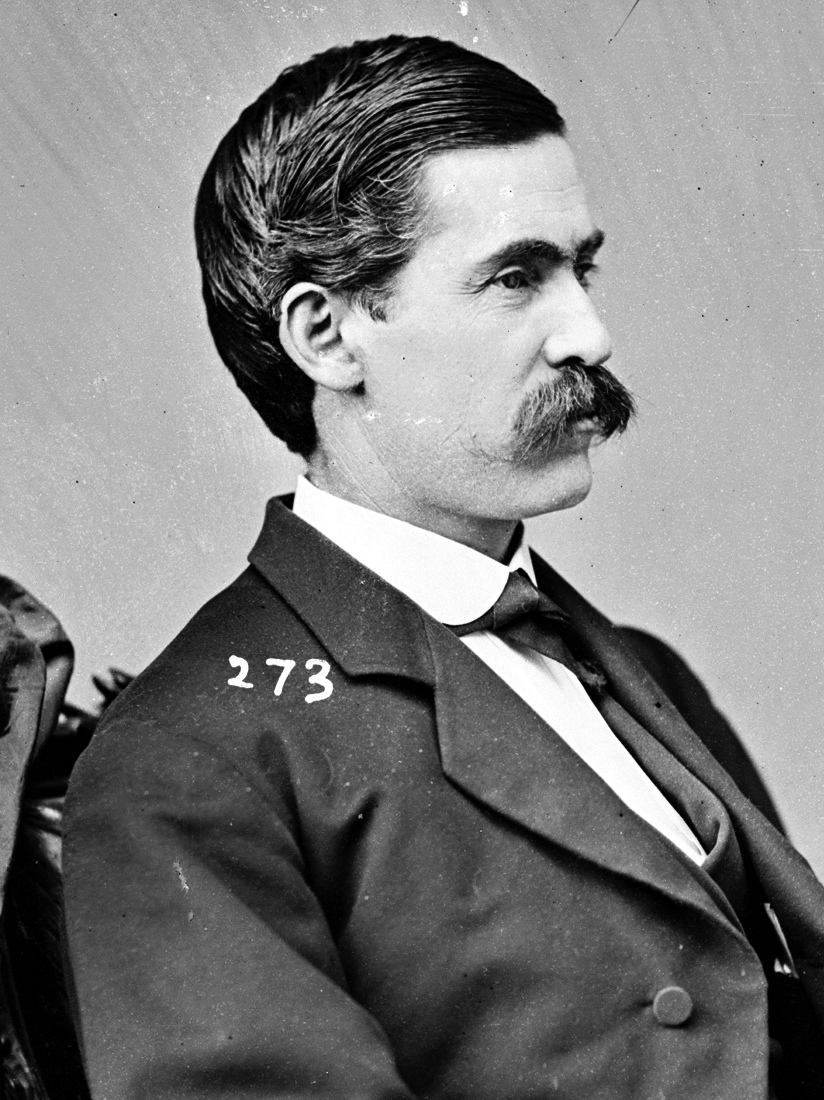
- Wilson c. 1860-1875

Member of the U.S. House of Representatives from Minnesota's 2nd district
- In office March 4, 1869 – March 3, 1871
- Preceded by: Ignatius L. Donnelly
- Succeeded by: John T. Averill

5th Mayor of Minneapolis
- In office April 9, 1872 – April 8, 1873
- Preceded by: Eli B. Ames
- Succeeded by: George A. Brackett

7th Mayor of Minneapolis
- In office April 14, 1874 – April 13, 1875
- Preceded by: George A. Brackett
- Succeeded by: Orlando C. Merriman

Personal details
- Born: Eugene McLanahan Wilson; December 25, 1833 Morgantown, Virginia, U.S. (now West Virginia)
- Died: April 10, 1890 (aged 56) Nassau, British West Indies (now The Bahamas)
- Party: Democratic
- Spouse: Elizabeth Kimball (m. 1865)
- Children: 4
- Parent: Edgar C. Wilson (father)
- Relatives: Thomas Wilson (grandfather)

Eugene McLanahan Wilson (December 25, 1833 – April 10, 1890) was an American lawyer and Democratic politician who served in various legal and political offices in Minnesota including as a member of Congress and as the fifth and seventh mayor of Minneapolis.

== Early life ==
Wilson was born in Morgantown, Monongalia County, Virginia (now West Virginia) on December 25, 1833. His father, Edgar C. Wilson, had been a lawyer and U.S. representative from Virginia (as had his grandfather Thomas Wilson). On his mother's side he was the great-grandson of Isaac Griffin, also a longtime U.S. Representative from Pennsylvania. He attended school in Morgantown and graduated from Jefferson College in 1852. He studied law, was admitted to the bar in 1855 and relocated to Minnesota shortly thereafter.

== Career ==
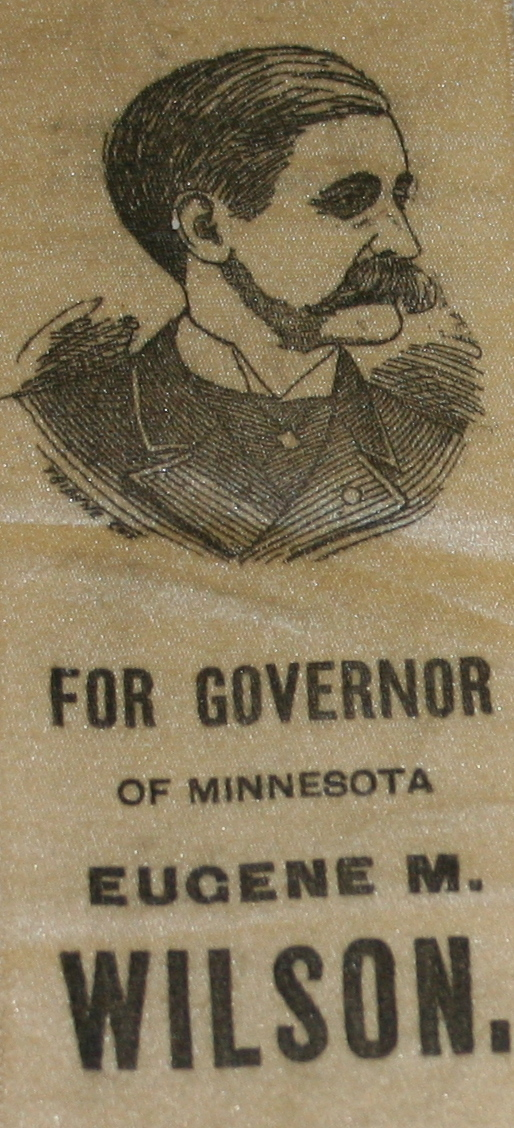
1888 Wilson campaign ribbon

Wilson worked in Winona, Minnesota for several years in a law practice with former classmate William B. Mitchell. In 1857 he was named United States Attorney for the District of Minnesota and relocated to Minneapolis. During the Civil War Wilson served in the Union Army as captain of Company A in the 1st Minnesota Volunteer Cavalry Regiment. The regiment was primarily involved with the Dakota War of 1862.

After the war, Wilson was elected to the Forty-first Congress (1869 – 1871). He was not a candidate for renomination in 1870. He resumed the practice of law, and was elected mayor of Minneapolis in 1872 and 1874.

In 1873, Wilson was involved in the abduction of Lord Gordon Gordon at the behest of Jay Gould from Canada. He was arrested together with Gould, Loren Fletcher and John Gilfillan. They were released on bail after diplomatic pressure by Minnesota Governor Horace Austin.

He was an unsuccessful candidate for election in 1874 to the Forty-fourth Congress. He served as a delegate to the Democratic National Convention in 1876 and was a member of the Minnesota Senate in 1878 and 1879. He twice ran for Governor of Minnesota, first in 1879, in which he lost the Democratic primary. The second time was in 1888. He would win the Democratic nomination, but would lose the election. Wilson would disavow the previously Democratic-aligned Knights of Labor. Wilson would be described as "the Candidate for the Monopolistic Bosses."

Wilson remained active in social as well as political affairs in Minnesota. He was twice president of the Minneapolis Club, in 1886 and 1890.

== Personal life ==
Wilson married Elizabeth Kimball, daughter of Colonel William M. Kimball, of Minneapolis on October 6, 1865. Together, they had four children.

== Death ==
Wilson died from malaria while on a visit to regain his health in Nassau, British West Indies (now The Bahamas) on April 10, 1890. He was buried in Lakewood Cemetery.

== Electoral history ==
- Minneapolis Mayoral Election, 1872
  - Eugene McLanahan Wilson 2,208
  - Dorilus Morrison 1,534
- Minneapolis Mayoral Election, 1874
  - Eugene McLanahan Wilson 2,533
  - George A. Brackett 2,147
  - John H. Thompson 415

Party political offices
| Preceded by A. A. Ames | Democratic nominee for Governor of Minnesota; 1888 | Succeeded by Thomas Wilson |
Political offices
| Preceded by Ignatius L. Donnelly | U.S. Representative for Minnesota's 2nd congressional district March 4, 1869 – March 3, 1871 | Succeeded by John T. Averill |
| Preceded by Eli B. Ames | Mayor of Minneapolis; 1872 – 1873 | Succeeded by George A. Brackett |
| Preceded by George A. Brackett | Mayor of Minneapolis; 1874 – 1875 | Succeeded by Orlando C. Merriman |
