= William Rush Merriam =

American politician (1849–1931)

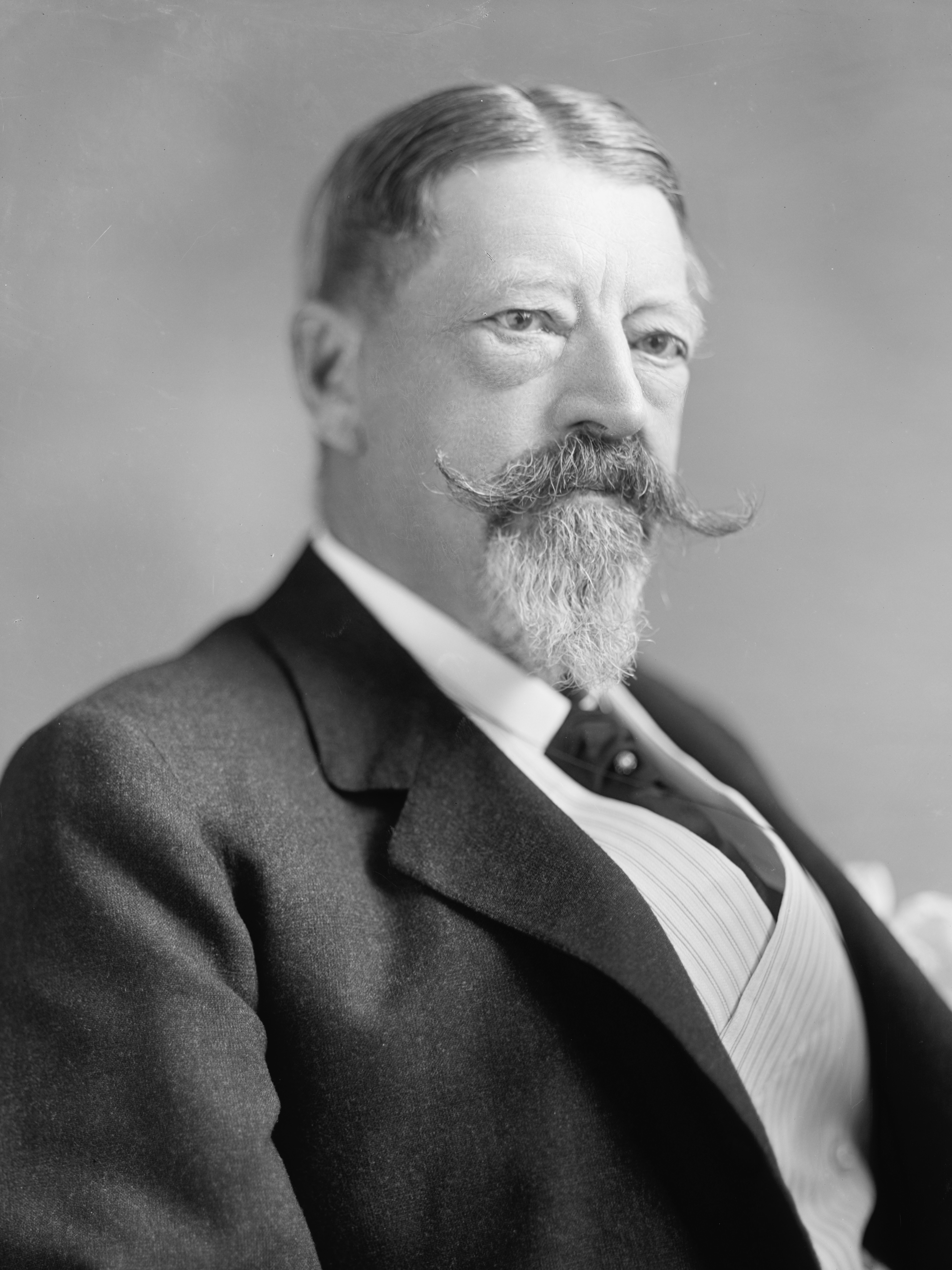
- Merriam, 1905–1931

11th Governor of Minnesota
- In office January 9, 1889 – January 4, 1893
- Lieutenant: Albert E. Rice; Gideon S. Ives
- Preceded by: Andrew Ryan McGill
- Succeeded by: Knute Nelson

18th Speaker of the Minnesota House of Representatives
- In office 1887–1889
- Preceded by: John L. Gibbs
- Succeeded by: Charles H. Graves

1st Director of the United States Census Bureau
- In office July 1, 1899 – March 31, 1903
- President: William McKinley
- Preceded by: Carroll D. Wright
- Succeeded by: Simon Newton Dexter North

Personal details
- Born: July 26, 1849 Wadham's Mills, New York, U.S.
- Died: February 18, 1931 (aged 81) Sewall's Point, Florida, U.S.
- Resting place: Rock Creek Cemetery; Washington, D.C., U.S.
- Party: Republican
- Spouse: Laura Hancock
- Profession: Banker
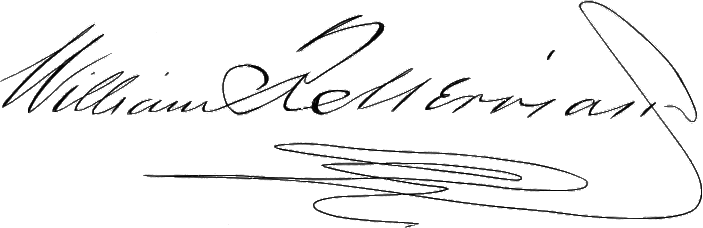
- Signature

William Rush Merriam (July 26, 1849 – February 18, 1931) was an American politician and banker. A Republican, he served as the 11th governor of Minnesota from 1889 to 1893. He also served as the first director of the United States Census Bureau under President William Mckinley.

== Life and career ==
Merriam was born in Wadham's Mills, New York, the son of Mahala Kimpton (Delano) and Minnesota house speaker John L. Merriam. His family moved to St. Paul, Minnesota in 1861. He served in the Minnesota House of Representatives in 1883 and 1887 and was the Speaker of the House in 1887. While in the legislature, he was elected president of the Merchants' National Bank in 1884. He served as the 11th governor of Minnesota from January 9, 1889 to January 4, 1893. He was a Republican.

=== As Governor ===
By 1888 a split in the state Republican Party was reflected in an unorthodox selection of a gubernatorial candidate. Instead of supporting the reform-minded incumbent, Andrew Ryan McGill, a majority of party stalwarts rallied behind William Merriam, an ambitious St. Paul banker and speaker of the Minnesota House of Representatives.

Merriam's re-election campaign two years later was affected by another, more widespread phenomenon, the Farmers' Alliance. This third party of disaffected Republicans and Democrats was dedicated to promoting the commercial and social interests of agrarian America. Merriam defeated the Alliance candidate in 1890, but the upstart party significantly eroded his plurality.

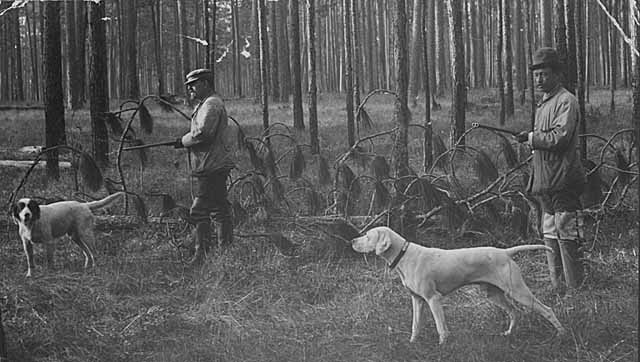
Merriam hunting with Horace Thompson

As governor, Merriam was a thrifty executive who was more interested in limiting spending than in legislative reform. The most notable legacy of his administration was the adoption of the Australian ballot, which allowed citizens to vote in comparative privacy. In his private life, the sociable Merriam was keen on sports, owned horses, and was said to possess "good nature, gracious manners, and an attractive personality."

== Later Life ==
Merriam's final accomplishment was appropriate for a banker and businessman who could work well with both people and numbers. He was director of the twelfth national census and later persuaded Congress to establish a permanent Census Bureau, where he served as its first director. Merriam never returned to Minnesota, but retired instead to Florida, where he died in Port Sewall at age 81.

== Remains ==
His three-quarter portrait by the Swiss born American artist Adolfo Müller-Ury (1862–1947) was painted in 1892. This and a portrait of his wife were exhibited in St. Paul in that year. A small, bust-length portrait, is now in the collection of the Newport Preservation Society, Rhode Island; it was formerly in the collections of Jessica Dragonette and the University of Wyoming. Müller-Ury is also known to have painted a portrait of their son Amherst Merriam as a baby.

Merriam is buried at Rock Creek Cemetery in Washington, DC.

Party political offices
| Preceded by Andrew Ryan McGill | Republican nominee for Governor of Minnesota; 1888, 1890 | Succeeded by Knute Nelson |
Political offices
| Preceded by John L. Gibbs | Speaker of the Minnesota House of Representatives; 1887–1889 | Succeeded by Charles H. Graves |
| Preceded by Andrew Ryan McGill | Governor of Minnesota; 1889–1893 | Succeeded by Knute Nelson |
| Preceded by Carroll D. Wright | Director of the United States Census Bureau; 1899–1903 | Succeeded by Simon Newton Dexter North |
