= Washburn family =

The Washburn family is a family dynasty of politicians, and business moguls from the United States and Canada. Their prominence dates back to the mid 17th century.

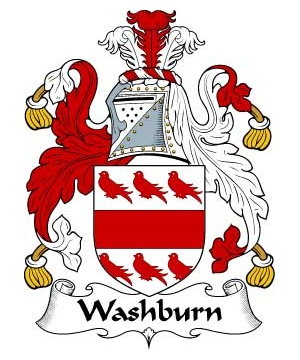
The Official Washburn Family Crest

== Family tree ==
- Israel Washburn I (1683–1719), of Bridgewater, Massachusetts Bay Colony.
  - Israel Washburn II (1718–1796), member of the Massachusetts Legislature (1780).
    - Israel Washburn III (1755–1841), member of the Massachusetts Legislature (1804–1810).
      - Israel Washburn IV (1784–1876), Massachusetts state representative (1815–1816, 1818–1819).
        - Israel Washburn V (1813–1883), Maine state representative (1842), U.S. representative from Maine (1851–1861), 29th governor of Maine (1861–1863).
        - Elihu B. Washburne (1816–1887), U.S. representative from Illinois (1853–1869), 25th U.S. secretary of state (1869), U.S. minister to France (1869–1877), candidate for Republican nomination for President of the United States (1880), candidate for Republican nomination for Vice President of the United States (1880).
          - Hempstead Washburne (1851–1918), attorney in Chicago, Illinois 1885–1889; 32nd mayor of Chicago 1891–1893.
        - Cadwallader C. Washburn (1818–1882), U.S. representative from Wisconsin (1855–1861, 1867–1871), 11th governor of Wisconsin (1872–1874).
          - Jeanette Garr (Kelsey) (1850–1931)
            - Albert Kelsey (1870–1950), American architect.
        - Charles Ames Washburn (1822–1889), U.S. diplomatic commissioner to Paraguay (1861–1863), U.S. minister to Paraguay (1863–1868).
        - William Drew Washburn Sr. (1831–1912), Minnesota state representative 1861, U.S. representative from Minnesota 1879–1885, U.S. senator from Minnesota (1889–1895).
          - Elizabeth Washburn Wright (1874–1952), anti-empire/anti-opium regie crusader and abolitionist, US Plenipotentiary Powers Abroad.
          - William Drew Washburn Jr. (1863–1929), member of the Minnesota Legislature (1901 1905 1909 1911 1917 1921 1923 1925).
          - Cadwallader Lincoln Washburn (1866–1965), artist, adventurer, war correspondent.
          - Stanley Washburn (1878–1950), delegate to the 1912 Republican National Convention, candidate for U.S. representative from New Jersey (1932).
            - C. Langhorne Washburn (1918–2011), businessman and political operative.
      - Reuel Washburn (1793–1878), Maine state senator (1827–1828), probate court judge in Maine (1857–1859).
        - Ganem W. Washburn (1823–1907), Wisconsin state senator (1859–1860); Wisconsin circuit court judge.
          - Alice Washburn (1860–1929), American silent film actress.

== Other ancillary relatives ==
- Dorilus Morrison (1814–1897), 1st & 3rd mayor of Minneapolis, Minnesota 1867–1868, 1869–1870, Minnesota state senator 1864–1865, was a first cousin of Israel V, Elihu, Cadwallader, Charles, & William Washburn (their mothers were sisters).
- Charles Sumner, U.S. senator, was a fourth cousin of Israel IV and Reuel Washburn.
- Elmer Washburn, 3rd chief of the U.S. Secret Service, was a fourth cousin of Israel V, Elihu, Cadwallader, Charles, William, & Ganem Washburn (their last common ancestor was Samuel Washburn 1652–1720).
- Robert N. Washburn, Former Vice President of Bell Canada. Served in the Royal Canadian Navy in World War II as a Lieutenant. Also, member of the Scudamore noble family deriving from England.
- Robert P. Washburn, Former Vice President of Nortel (Northern Telecom), 2nd child of 3 to Robert N. Washburn. The Former Chief of staff to congressman John Dingell, and social connections to various Canadian political figures.

== See also ==
- List of United States political families
