= Stanley Washburn =

American war correspondent (1878–1950)

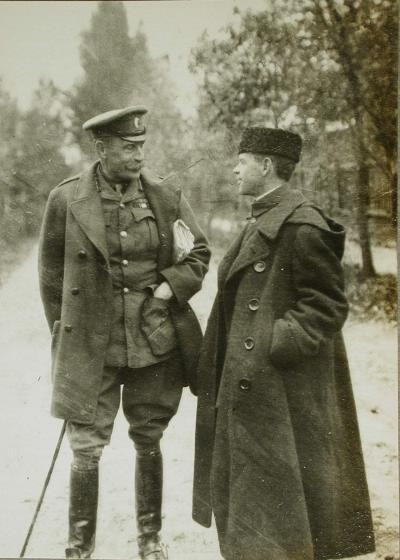
Washburn (right) with British officer John Hanbury-Williams in Russia, October 1914

Stanley Washburn (February 7, 1878 – December 14, 1950) was an American war correspondent particularly associated with reporting on Russian operations. He covered the Russo-Japanese War of 1904–1905, where he was one of the first on the battlefield to learn that peace had been agreed, followed by the Russian Revolution of 1905.

During World War One, he reported from the Eastern Front and made recommendations that the US support the Russian war effort before being reassigned to a commission sent to liaise with the Russian Provisional Government. He advocated that the US government support the Don Republic during the Russian Civil War and, in 1941, ahead of the attack on Pearl Harbor sent a message warning the leadership of the US Navy not to underestimate the Japanese.

== Early life ==
Washburn was born on February 7, 1878, in Minneapolis, Minnesota. He was the son of Elizabeth (née Muzzy) and William Drew Washburn, a member of the Minnesota House of Representatives, the United States House of Representatives, and the United States Senate.

Washburn was a member of the Washburn family of Raynham, Massachusetts, which include numerous politicians. His paternal grandfather, Israel Washburn Jr. was a governor of Maine and served in the United States House of Representatives. His uncles included Cadwallader Colden Washburn, Charles Ames Washburn, Elihu Benjamin Washburne, and Israel Washburn Jr.. His brother, William Drew Washburn Jr., was also a member of the Minnesota House of Representatives.

Washburn attended Williams College, where he wdas member of the fraternity of Delta Psi (St. Anthony Hall). Although he did not graduate, he later received an honorary Doctor of Humane Letters from Williams.

== Career ==
During the 1904–05 Russo-Japanese War, he worked as a war correspondent, initially covering the conflict from the Russian side. Following Japanese victories in the war he found himself working from the Japanese side of the frontline. He communicated with newspaper offices in the United States by means of a telegraph running across Manchuria and Korea and via Nagasaki in Japan. Through this telegraph he learnt of the end of the war from the editor of the Chicago Daily News and was able to record the reactions of Japanese troops when he revealed this information. Washburn moved from the battlefront to Russia to cover the Revolution of 1905. In 1912, he was a delegate to the Republican national convention from Minnesota.

Washburn covered the Eastern Front of World War One. His articles were published in periodicals and books in the US, leading him to become well known to the American public. Washburn's reporting was generally favourable to Russia; he downplayed the discontent among the population caused by Tsar Nicholas II's order to close down vodka shops and did not mention the intense anti-Semitism that prevailed in the country during the period.

In spring 1917 Washburn was in Baltimore in the United States, following the February Revolution that saw the Russian Empire dissolved. There, he discussed with railway executive Daniel Willard the shortage of ammunition and other war materiel in the Russian army and recommended that the US help to make improvements to the Trans-Siberian Railway to support Russia's war effort. The US shortly after entered the war and Willard as chairman of the Advisory Committee on National Defense was told to assemble a commission to act on Washburn's idea. It was planned to assign Washburn to the commission sent to Russia, which was headed by American engineer John Frank Stevens. At a late moment Washburn was instead appointed to the mission headed by Elihu Root sent by US President Woodrow Wilson to liaise with the post-revolution Russian Provisional Government of which Washburn was a strong supporter. In this role Washburn was granted the rank of major. Washburn had returned to the United States by December 1917. Washburn was acquainted with many of the Tsarist generals and was an admirer of Mikhail Alekseyev; as a result of this he lobbied Robert Lansing to support the anti-Bolshevik Don Republic during the Russian Civil War.

Washburn became the president of the Washburn Lignite Coal Company in Wilton, North Dakota from 1926 to 1929. Washburn later lived in Lakewood, New Jersey, and was an unsuccessful candidate for election to the United States House of Representatives for the Republican Party in 1932. On November 29, 1941, he wrote to Frank Knox, a Republican serving as secretary of the Navy under Democratic president Franklin D. Roosevelt, to warn him not to underestimate the Japanese and advise that they "never do what they're expected to do". Knox passed the message on to the Chief of Naval Operations, Harold Raynsford Stark, who mailed it to Admiral Husband E. Kimmel, commander of the Pacific Fleet, on December 2. The message arrived only after the Japanese had launched the December 7 surprise attack on Kimmel's fleet base at Pearl Harbor, Hawaii.

== Personal life ==
On November 27, 1906, Washburn married Alice Langhorne.

Washburn was member of the American Legion, the Benevolent and Protective Order of Elks, the Freemasons, the Reserve Officers Association, and the Veterans of Foreign Wars.

Washburn died on December 14, 1950, at the age of 72. He was buried at Arlington National Cemetery.
