= Senator Washburn =

Senator Washburn may refer to:

== Members of the United States Senate ==
- William B. Washburn (1820–1887), U.S. Senator from Massachusetts from 1874 to 1875
- William D. Washburn (1831–1912), U.S. Senator from Minnesota from 1889 to 1895

== United States state senate members ==
- Charles G. Washburn (1857–1928), Massachusetts State Senate
- Emory Washburn (1800–1877), Massachusetts State Senate
- Ganem W. Washburn (1823–1907), Wisconsin State Senate
- Henry W. Washburn (1899–1983), Iowa State Senate
- Reuel Washburn (1793–1878), Maine State Senate
- Robert M. Washburn (1868–1946), Massachusetts State Senate

== See also ==
- Senator Ashburn (disambiguation)
