= Cadwallader Washburn =

Cadwallader Washburn may refer to:

- Cadwallader C. Washburn (1818–1882), American businessman, politician, and soldier
- Cadwallader Lincoln Washburn (1866–1965), American artist and adventurer
