= Ethel Wilson Gammon =

American educator and living history museum founder and director

- Gammon in 1997
- Born: Ethel Searle Wilson; July 31, 1916; Augusta, Maine
- Died: January 11, 2009 (aged 92); Livermore, Maine
- Other name: Billie Gammon
- Education: B.A. education, University of Maine at Farmington, 1974; M.A. education, University of Maine at Portland-Gorham, 1975
- Occupation: Executive director
- Years active: 1974–1991
- Organization: Washburn-Norlands Living History Center
- Spouse: Alfred Quimby Gammon
- Children: 2
- Parent(s): Howard Goucher Wilson; Mable Beatrice Searle Wilson
- Awards: Maine Women's Hall of Fame, 1997

Ethel "Billie" Wilson Gammon (July 31, 1916 – January 11, 2009) was an American educator and living history museum founder and director. In 1974 she founded the Washburn-Norlands Living History Center on the former estate of Israel Washburn in Livermore, Maine, and served as its volunteer executive director until 1991. Her educational and outreach programs brought 40,000 visitors to the site annually by the end of the twentieth century. She was inducted into the Maine Women's Hall of Fame in 1997.

== Early life and education ==
Ethel Searle Wilson was born in Augusta, Maine, to Howard Goucher Wilson, a farmer, and his wife, Mable Beatrice Searle Wilson. She was always known as "Billie". Her father had four sons from a previous marriage. She and her family lived in Nictaux, Nova Scotia, from 1923 to 1926. She entered Cony High School in Augusta at age 12 and graduated at age 15. She received a degree in education from the Washington State Normal School in Machias at age 17.

Later in life, she earned higher education degrees, including a bachelor's degree in education from the University of Maine at Farmington in 1974 and a master's degree in education from the University of Maine at Portland-Gorham in 1975.

== Career ==
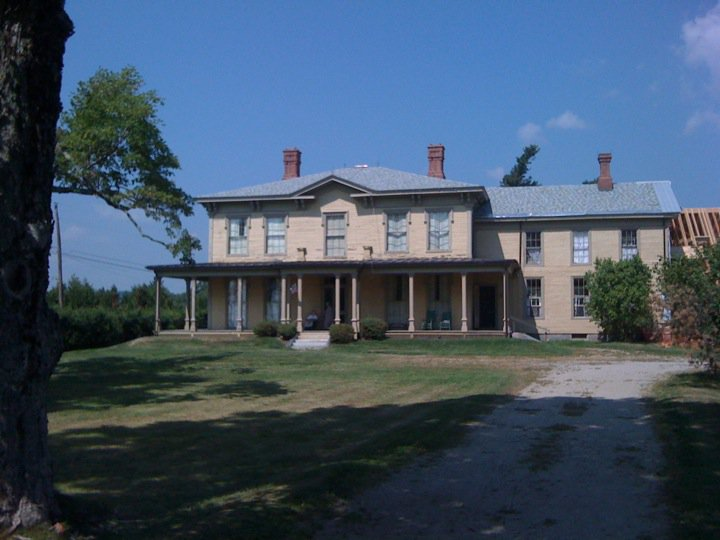
Main building of the Washburn-Norlands Living History Center

After high school, Wilson taught in elementary schools in Parkman, Livermore, and Augusta. She also taught third-grade Sunday school at North Livermore Baptist Church for 23 years.

As a teacher at the Payson-Smith School in North Livermore at age 19, Wilson boarded with Clinton and Elizabeth Babb, the former farmer and housekeeper of The Norlands who lived in a cottage on the estate. The stories that the couple told her about the Israel Washburn family piqued her interest in the estate. In 1953 one of the Washburn descendants asked her to help repair the library at The Norlands and open it to visitors, which she began doing one afternoon a week in summer 1954. On the other days, she cleared away debris and discovered reams of historical papers and records which shed light on life in mid-nineteenth-century Maine. In ensuing years, she developed a vision for restoring the mansion, library, church, schoolhouse, barn, and two carriage sheds on the 450-acre (180 ha) property, and using them for educational purposes. In 1973 she convinced the Washburn heirs to sign over their property to a nonprofit educational foundation called the Washburn-Norlands Foundation, and opened the Washburn-Norlands Living History Center in 1974. She pursued fundraising and grants to further renovate the buildings, and between 1991 and 1996 raised $125,000 for an endowment campaign which received matching funds from the National Endowment for the Humanities.

Outhouses are the most effective artifacts for teaching seat-of-the-pants history.

— "Billie" Gammon

Gammon designed educational and outreach programs that immersed visiting students, teachers, and tourists in what it was like to live in mid-nineteenth century Maine. She developed six-month and one-year student internships that awarded college credits for on-site living and study. According to a 1999 article in the Indianapolis Business Journal: "Pennsylvania State University students in Parks and Recreation Management trek to Maine every January to cut ice". Gammon also created three-day-weekend programs for teachers and students, as well as for paying tourists, in which participants experienced historical living and study. Each weekend group was divided into two families, the Waters and the Prays, and each participant took on the identity of a historical personage. Gammon herself enjoyed playing these historical roles; one of her favorite characters was that of Mercy Lovejoy, an early nineteenth-century Maine pauper. Thousands of Maine schoolchildren also engaged in role-playing during annual field trips to the site. By the time of Gammon's retirement in 1991, over 40,000 people were visiting The Norlands each year.

Gammon wrote numerous pamphlets describing the history of the Washburn family, The Norlands, and life in Maine in the mid-nineteenth century. She served as executive director of the living history museum on a volunteer basis from 1974 to 1991. Though she retired on her 75th birthday in 1991, she returned in 1996 as interim director. She was instrumental in the opening of the Washburn Humanities Center at The Norlands in 1992.

== Other activities ==
Gammon was a member of the State Department of Educational Ministries for American Baptist Churches for more than 12 years. She helped establish and run the North Livermore Reading Club Library and the first seniors group in the area, and was also a Girl Scout leader. She was editor of the Maine Archives & Museums Newsletter from 1997 to 2008.

== Awards and honors ==
Gammon was inducted into the Maine Women's Hall of Fame in 1997. She received a Distinguished Achievement Award from the University of Maine in 1997. In 1999 she received the Constance H. Carlson Public Humanities Prize from the Maine Humanities Council. Later that same year, she was awarded a History Medal from the Daughters of the American Revolution and the Deborah Morton Award from the University of New England. In 2002 the University of Maine at Farmington awarded her an honorary doctorate.

Posthumously, the University of Maine at Machias established the Ethel "Billie" Wilson Gammon Scholarship for history or education majors, and the Washburn-Norlands Foundation endowed its annual Ethel "Billie" Gammon History Education Fellowship for Maine high school seniors in 2009.

== Personal life ==
She married Alfred Quimby Gammon (1915–1985), a comptroller, in June 1938. The couple settled in North Livermore, where they converted a carriage house into a home. They enjoyed sailing on their boat, Sweet Dream. They had a son and daughter.

In 1996 her granddaughter, Darcy Gammon Wakefield, conducted an oral history interview with Gammon for a graduate course at the State University of New York at Buffalo, producing the paper 'There May be Flies on Ma and Pa, But There Ain't No Flies on Bill': An Oral History of a Rural Maine Woman, 1916–Present. Over the next decade Wakefield expanded the book with additional stories and material; the completed book was published in 2006 by the Maine Folklife Center under the title 'No Flies on Bill': The Story of an Uncontrollable Old Woman, My Grandmother, Ethel 'Billie' Gammon.

== Selected bibliography ==
- The Washburn family of Norlands. Washburn-Norlands Foundation. 1998. OCLC 57118770.
- School Days, 1850s. Washburn-Norlands Foundation. 1986. OCLC 38241614.
- Rural reflections, 1840s to 1880s: A living history program at Norlands, Livermore, Maine. Washburn-Norlands Foundation. 1978. OCLC 5844062. (with Glenda Richards)
- Life at Norlands, 1840s. 1976. OCLC 4052220.
- Rural reflections: Life at Norlands, 1840s to 1880s. 1976. OCLC 57122878.
- The story of the Norlands : Maine's best kept secret. 1974. OCLC 12953292.
- The Three Daughters of Israel and Patty Washburn. 1973. OCLC 13733167.

== Sources ==
- Wakefield, Darcy Gammon (1996). 'There May be Flies on Ma and Pa, But There Ain't No Flies on Bill': An Oral History of a Rural Maine Woman, 1916–Present. State University of New York at Buffalo.
- Wakefield, Darcy Gammon (2006). 'No Flies on Bill': The Story of an Uncontrollable Old Woman, My Grandmother, Ethel 'Billie' Gammon. Maine Folklife Center. ISBN 0943197325.
