= Israel Washburn =

American politician (1784-1876)

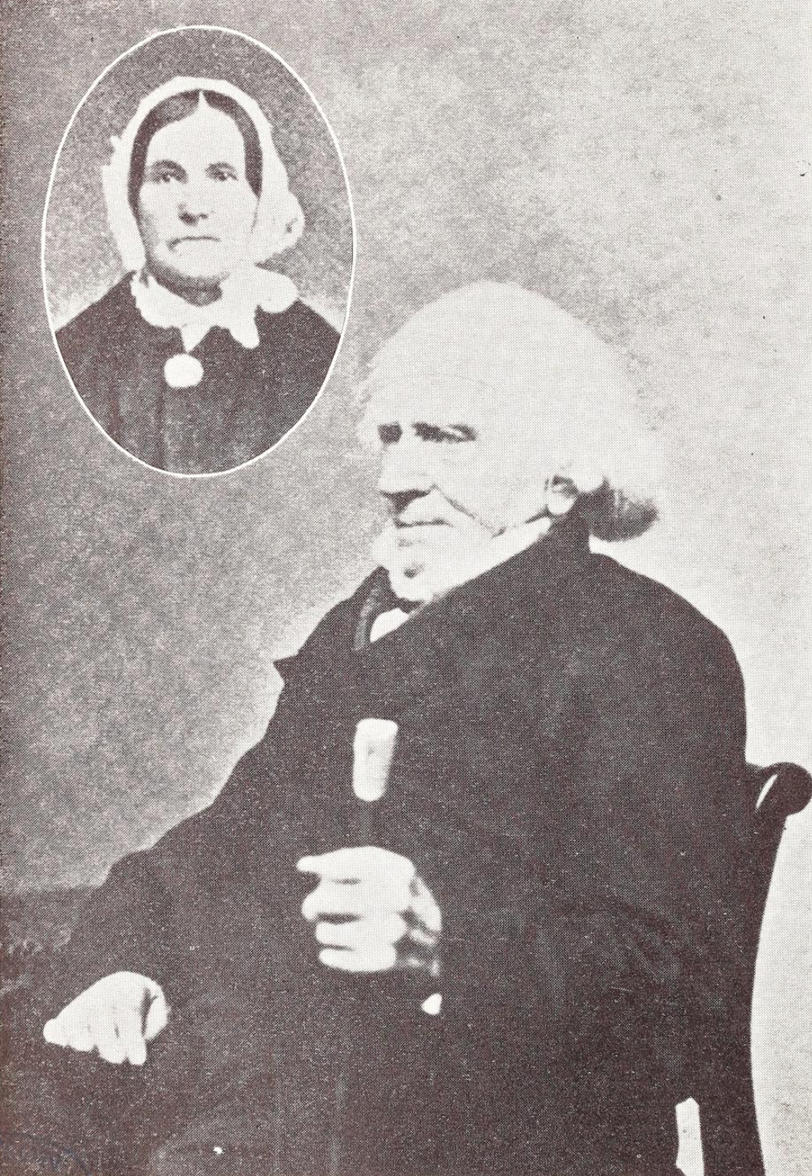
Photograph of Israel Washburn with, in medallion, a photograph of his wife, Martha "Patty" Benjamin Washburn (1792-1861).

Israel Washburn IV (November 18, 1784 – September 1, 1876) was an American farmer, politician, and pioneer settler of Livermore, Maine. He served two terms in the Massachusetts House of Representatives before Maine became a separate state.

He was a member of the Washburn family of New England, and had several notable sons, including U.S. secretary of state Elihu B. Washburne, Maine governor Israel Washburn V, Wisconsin governor Cadwallader C. Washburn, and U.S. senator William D. Washburn.

== Early life ==
Washburn's family was from Massachusetts, to which their ancestor emigrated from England in 1631. He was born in Raynham, Massachusetts, in 1784, the son of Israel Washburn and Abiah King. His brother was Reuel Washburn.

== Settlement in Maine ==
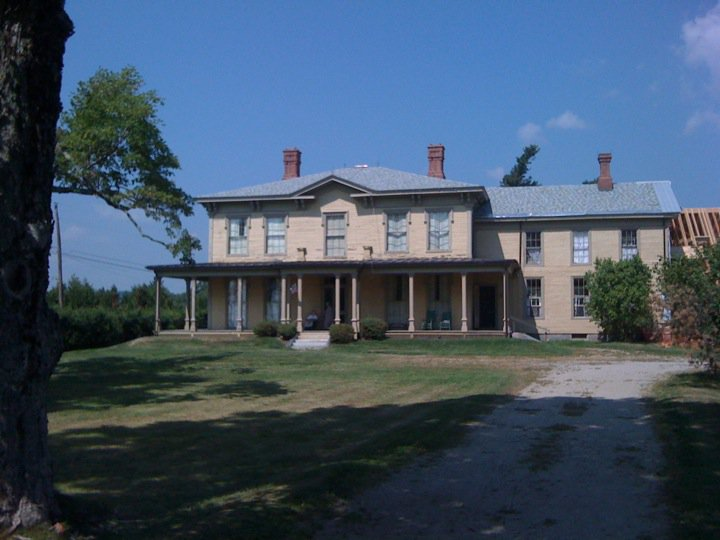
Today's Israel Washburn Homestead (also known as The Norlands) in Livermore, Maine.

Washburn moved north to Maine in 1806. He was a school teacher for a couple of years, before working in the shipbuilding industry at White's Landing on the Kennebec River.

In 1809, at age 25, Washburn bought a homestead with some acres of farmland at The Norlands in Livermore, Maine. He settled there, working on the farm. He also opened a general store.

== Political career ==
Washburn was elected twice and he served in the Massachusetts House of Representatives, in 1815–1816 and 1818–1819. He remained very active in local politics until 1829.

== Personal life ==
On March 26, 1812, Washburn married Martha "Patty" Benjamin (1792–1861), daughter of Lieutenant Samuel Benjamin, a Revolutionary War veteran. They had eleven children together, ten survived, including seven sons. Their sons included Israel Washburn V, Elihu B. Washburne, Cadwallader C. Washburn, Charles Ames Washburn, and William D. Washburn.

== Later life and death ==
In 1829, Washburn's general store failed, and he returned to farming. In 1859, at age 75, he became blind. Two years after, he became a widower upon the death of Martha.

Washburn died in 1876, aged 91. He was interred in Waters Hill Cemetery in Livermore, alongside his wife.
