= Governor Washburn =

Governor Washburn may refer to:

- Cadwallader C. Washburn (1818–1882), 11th Governor of Wisconsin
- Emory Washburn (1800–1877), 22nd Governor of Massachusetts
- Israel Washburn Jr. (1813–1883), 29th Governor of Maine
- Peter T. Washburn (1814–1870), 31st Governor of Vermont
- William B. Washburn (1820–1887), 28th Governor of Massachusetts
