= Charles Ames Washburn =

American diplomat

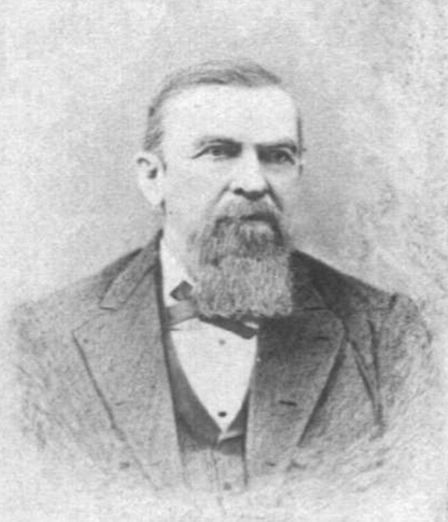

United States Minister to Paraguay
- In office May 13, 1863 – September 10, 1868
- President: Abraham Lincoln; Andrew Johnson
- Preceded by: Office Established
- Succeeded by: Martin T. McMahon

Charles Ames Washburn (March 16, 1822 – January 26, 1889), also known as C. A. Washburn, was the U.S. Minister to Paraguay.

He was born in Livermore, Maine. He was the son of Israel Washburn Sr.; nephew of Reuel Washburn; brother of Israel Washburn, Jr., Elihu B. Washburne, Cadwallader C. Washburn and William D. Washburn. He went to California for the 1849 Gold Rush.

In 1854 in San Francisco, Washburn and Benjamin Franklin Washington fought a duel with rifles at forty paces. Washburn was severely wounded by the second shot fired at him. Neither died.

A member of the Republican Party, Washburn was later Presidential Elector for California, 1860; U.S. Diplomatic Commissioner to Paraguay, 1861–63; U.S. Minister to Paraguay, 1863–68; novelist; and inventor of an early typewriter.

== See also ==
- United States Ambassador to Paraguay
- Paraguayan War
