= Cadwallader Lincoln Washburn =

American artist and adventurer

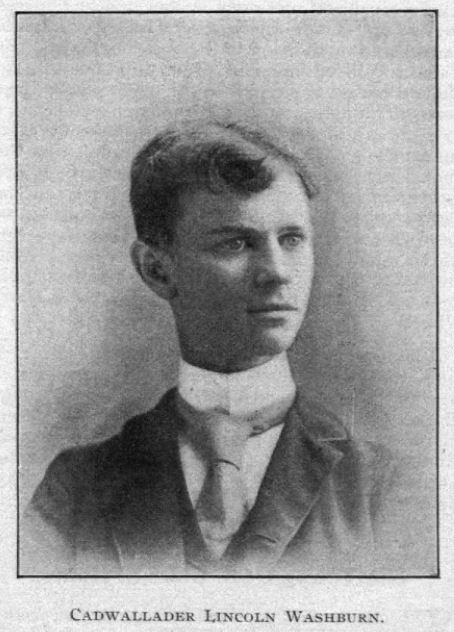
- Born: October 13, 1866; Minneapolis
- Died: December 21, 1965 (aged 99); Farmington
- Alma mater: Gallaudet University; Massachusetts Institute of Technology

Cadwallader Lincoln Washburn (October 13, 1866 – December 21, 1965) was an American artist and adventurer. Deaf from the age of five, Washburn had a varied career, including creating paintings and etchings and serving as a war correspondent in the Russo-Japanese War, Mexican Revolution, and World War I. He was also an accomplished naturalist, writing on the intelligence of insects and spiders as well as serving on an expedition collecting bird eggs.

== Early life and education ==
Cadwallader Lincoln Washburn was born October 13, 1866, in Minneapolis, Minnesota. He was born into a wealthy family, the son of William Drew Washburn and the grandson of Israel and Martha Washburn. He became deaf at age five after contracting scarlet fever and spinal meningitis. He was a student at the Minnesota State Academy for the Deaf and graduated in 1884.

Washburn attended Gallaudet College, graduating as the class valedictorian with a Bachelors of Arts degree in 1890. While he originally planned on studying natural science and entomology, writing essays with his own illustrations of spiders, bees, and caterpillars, he discovered a love for drawing at Gallaudet. He went on to study architecture at the Massachusetts Institute of Technology, graduating in 1893.

== Career in art ==
After graduating from MIT, Washburn moved to New York City, where he shared an apartment with illustrator Howard Chandler Christy. He joined the Art Students League and studied painting under Harry Siddons Mowbray. He took private lessons from painter William Merritt Chase and studied at Chase's Shinnecock Hills Summer School of Art, where he returned multiple summers. He traveled to Europe along with Chase and other students, studying with Albert Besnard in Paris and with Joaquín Sorolla in Spain. While living in Venice, Washburn was inspired to embrace drypoint etching, buying supplies in Paris and creating his first drypoint etchings in 1903. Though he did not begin to etch until he was mid-career, he created over 1,000 etchings.

He exhibited regularly around the beginning of the twentieth century, including in the Paris salons, the Pennsylvania Academy of the Fine Arts, the Art Institute of Chicago, and at the 1904 Louisiana Purchase Exposition. His paintings, a part of the realist movement, are marked by a fluid, brushy technique and special attention given to light and atmosphere. Washburn was known as "the silent artist" and was quoted as saying "deafness may sometimes be an inconvenience but never a handicap".

== International travels ==
In 1904, the Chicago Daily News hired him as a war correspondent covering the Russo-Japanese War from Manchuria and Japan via etchings and text. He lived in a temple in Kyoto along with his brother Stanley Washburn. The Washburn brothers discovered the location of the Japanese fleet under Admiral Togo on the Mekong River in Indochina and reported it as a scoop; an international incident resulted from the story as Japan argued France was violating its neutrality. He returned to the U.S. in 1907 and continued to work on his etchings.

Washburn traveled to Mexico in 1910 to study architecture and Mexican culture. When the Mexican Revolution began, he reported on the conflict; at one point the railroad station where he was typing a report was riddled with bullets. Washburn was the last outsider to interview the notoriously secretive President Francisco I. Madero shortly before his assassination. When the violence escalated in 1911, he booked passage home on the SS Merida, but the boat sank after a collision and Washburn's copperplates and canvases were lost at sea.

He and his brother Stanley became war correspondents again at the outbreak of World War I, traveling through Japan, Hong Kong, and Thailand. In 1916 he returned to the U.S., painting portraits of local Native Americans in Arizona. Washburn then traveled to Mexico again, creating illustrations of bullfighting.

In 1922 Washburn traveled to the Marquesas Islands with a scientific expedition, sketching rare birds and collecting eggs. He spent seven months on the islands; his adventures there included meeting a group of islanders who he described as cannibals, teaching them signs and convincing them to model for his etchings.

== Later life ==
Washburn continued his artwork throughout his life, though by 1937 his eyesight had deteriorated and he switched mediums from etching to oil painting. He was elected an associate of the National Academy of Design in 1940 and exhibited there several times between 1940 and 1955. The De Young Museum held a solo exhibition of his work in 1954.

He married Margaret Ohrt in 1943 and they settled in Maine. Washburn returned to studying insects, arguing for the intelligence and communication skills of spiders, bees, and caterpillars. He wrote an essay titled "The Mind of a Spider" which became required reading in the 1940s in the Washington D.C. public schools, after impressing the superintendent of the school system.

Washburn died in Farmington, Maine on December 21, 1965.

== Awards and legacy ==
Gallaudet College awarded Washburn an honorary Doctor of Science degree in 1924 and he received an honorary Doctor of Humane Letters degree from Bowdoin College in 1947. In 1969, Gallaudet dedicated the Washburn Arts Center in his honor.
