= Senator Ashburn =

Senator Ashburn may refer to:

- Roy Ashburn (born 1954), California State Senate
- Thomas Q. Ashburn (judge) (1820–1890), Ohio State Senate

== See also ==
- Senator Washburn (disambiguation)
