= The Norlands =

Historic house in Maine, United States

- Norlands & The Washburns
- U.S. National Register of Historic Places
- U.S. Historic district
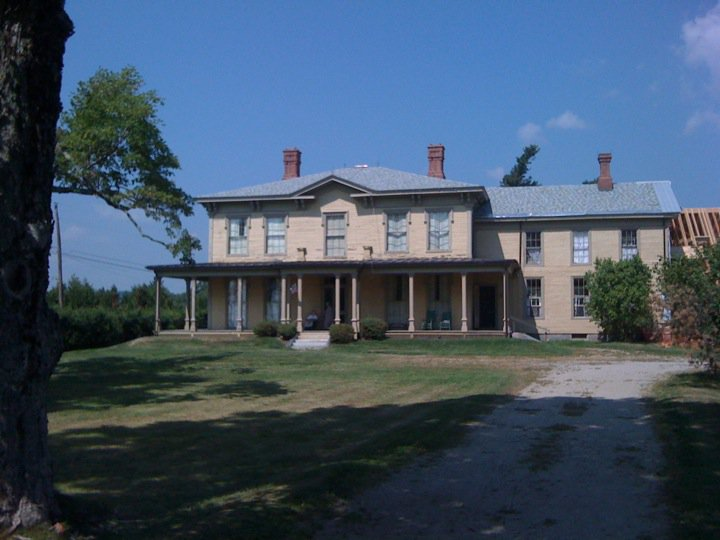
- The Norlands mansion in August 2010. Part of the farmer's cottage reconstruction can be seen on the right

- Location within Maine Location within the United States
- Location: 290 Norlands Rd., Livermore, Maine
- Coordinates: 44°24′27″N 70°12′39″W
- Built: 1821
- Architectural style: Gothic Revival
- NRHP reference No.: 69000004
- Added to NRHP: December 30, 1969

The Norlands (also known as the Israel Washburn Homestead) is a historic building on Norlands Road in Livermore, Maine, United States. It was owned by Israel Washburn and his descendants.

== History ==
The Gothic Revival-style house was built in 1821 and added to the National Register of Historic Places in 1969. The house is now operated as part of the Washburn-Norlands Living History Center, a 19th-century period farm with living-history demonstrations. The buildings include the Norlands mansion, a mid-19th-century period schoolhouse, a library with displays about the Washburn family, a meeting house, a farmer's cottage, and a barn with farm animals. The barn and farmer's cottage burned down in April 2008 but the Farmer's Cottage was rebuilt and reopened in early 2011. The barn was later reconstructed in an early configuration.

== Fire ==
A fire started on April 28, 2008, at the Washburn-Norlands Living History Center. The fire was likely caused by a lamp tipping over and falling into hay, setting it alight. Volunteer firefighters, whom had prepared in advance for a fire in this scenario, put out the fire with assistance from 10 other fire departments. Langhorne Washburn, the only living descendant born at the Norlands, said to the Sun Journal: "...Thank God Norlands didn’t burn. I would like to commend (the firefighters) on their efficiency." in preventing the fire. Rebuilding of the farm spanned several years.

== Bibliography ==
- Remarkable Americans: The Washburn Family by Kerck Kelsey
- The Rise and Fall of William Drew Washburn by Kerck Kelsey

== See also ==
- Ethel Wilson Gammon, founder and first executive director of the Washburn-Norlands Living History Center
