= Ganem W. Washburn =

American lawyer, politician and judge

Wisconsin Circuit Court Judge for the 10th Circuit
- In office February 2, 1864 – April 1870
- Appointed by: James T. Lewis
- Preceded by: Edwin Wheeler
- Succeeded by: Ezra T. Sprague

Member of the Wisconsin Senate from the 21st district
- In office January 1, 1859 – January 1, 1861
- Preceded by: Edwin Wheeler
- Succeeded by: Horace O. Crane

Personal details
- Born: October 29, 1823 Livermore, Maine, U.S.
- Died: October 7, 1907 (aged 83) Oshkosh, Wisconsin, U.S.
- Cause of death: Heart failure
- Resting place: Riverside Cemetery, Oshkosh
- Party: Republican
- Spouse: Sarah Perley Strickland (m. 1850–1907)
- Children: Clara Elizabeth (Morgan)^{(b. 1851; died 1915)}; John Reuel Washburn^{(b. 1853; died 1949)}; Mary G. (Harmon)^{(b. 1855)}; Benjamin Washburn^{(b. 1860; died 1861)}; Alice Washburn^{(b. 1860; died 1929)}
- Parent: Reuel Washburn (father)
- Relatives: Washburn family
- Education: Bowdoin College
- Profession: Lawyer, judge

Ganem W. Washburn (October 29, 1823 – October 7, 1907) was an American lawyer, politician, and Wisconsin pioneer. He was a Wisconsin circuit court judge for 6 years, and served two years in the Wisconsin Senate, representing Winnebago County. His name is sometimes incorrectly abbreviated "Geo. W. Washburn" in historical documents.

== Biography ==
Born in Livermore, Maine, Washburn was the son of Reuel Washburn, a Maine legislator, and cousin of Israel Washburn Jr., the 29th Governor of Maine. Washburn graduated from Bowdoin College in 1845. He then studied law with his father and his cousin Israel Washburn in Orono, Maine. He was admitted to the Maine bar in 1847 and then moved to Oshkosh, Wisconsin Territory, where he continued to practice law. In 1859 and 1860, Washburn served in the Wisconsin State Senate. From 1861 to 1864, Washburn served as probate judge of Winnebago County.

In 1864, Washburn was appointed Wisconsin circuit court judge for the 10th circuit, to replace the deceased Edwin Wheeler. He was subsequently elected to a full term in the office. In 1870, the Wisconsin Legislature passed a law which established a new judicial circuit, and the change in circuit maps made Washburn ineligible to remain judge of the 10th circuit—Winnebago County was no longer part of the circuit.

Washburn resumed his career as a lawyer until 1879, when he resigned due to poor hearing. Washburn then supervised his real estate holdings and his farm. Washburn died suddenly of heart failure at his home in Oshkosh, Wisconsin.

Wisconsin Senate
| Preceded by Edwin Wheeler | Member of the Wisconsin Senate from the 21st district January 1, 1859 – January 1, 1861 | Succeeded by Horace O. Crane |
Legal offices
| Preceded by Edwin Wheeler | Wisconsin Circuit Court Judge for the 10th Circuit; February 2, 1864 – April 1870 | Succeeded by Ezra T. Sprague |
