= SS Merida =

A number of steamships were named Merida, including

- Merida, an American bulk freighter which sank in a 1916 storm on Lake Erie
- Merida, an American passenger cargo ship in service 1906–1911 with Ward Line which sank in collision with steamer Admiral Farragut
- Merida, an American cargo ship in service 1911–1937 with Red D Line
- Merida, a British cargo ship wrecked off Le Touquet
