= William Drew Washburn Jr. =

American politician (1863–1929)

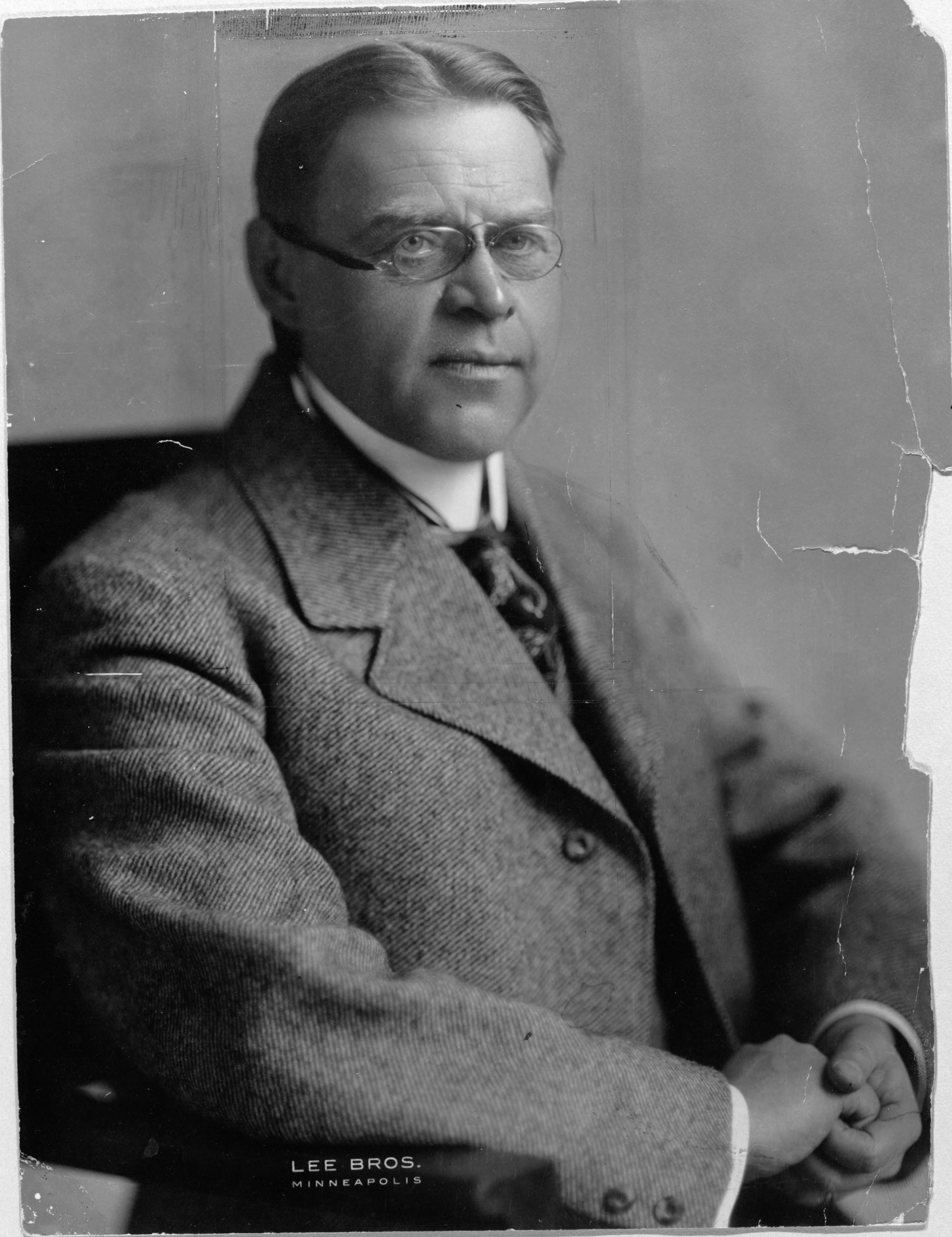

Member of the Minnesota House of Representatives
- In office 1921 – 1926; 1917 – 1918; 1909 – 1912; 1901 – 1906

Personal details
- Born: April 3, 1863 Saint Paul, Minnesota, U.S.
- Died: October 10, 1929 (aged 66) Minneapolis, Minnesota, U.S.
- Resting place: Lakewood Cemetery
- Party: Republican
- Relations: Washburn family
- Parent: William D. Washburn (father)
- Education: Yale University

William Drew Washburn Jr. (April 3, 1863 – October 10, 1929) was an American politician and businessman.

== Early life and education ==
Born in Saint Paul, Minnesota, Washburn attended Minneapolis Public Schools and graduated from Phillips Andover Academy in 1883. In 1888, Washburn graduated from Yale University.

== Career ==
Washburn was in the newspaper, real estate, and railroad business. He served in the Minnesota House of Representatives from 1901 to 1903, 1905–1907, 1909 to 1913, 1917 to 1919, and 1921 to 1926. Washburn was a Republican.

== Personal life ==
Washburn is a member of the political Washburn family. His father, William D. Washburn, served in the United States Congress and Minnesota Legislature.

Washburn died on October 10, 1929. He was buried in Lakewood Cemetery.
