= Cadwallader C. Washburn =

American politician and businessman (1818–1882)

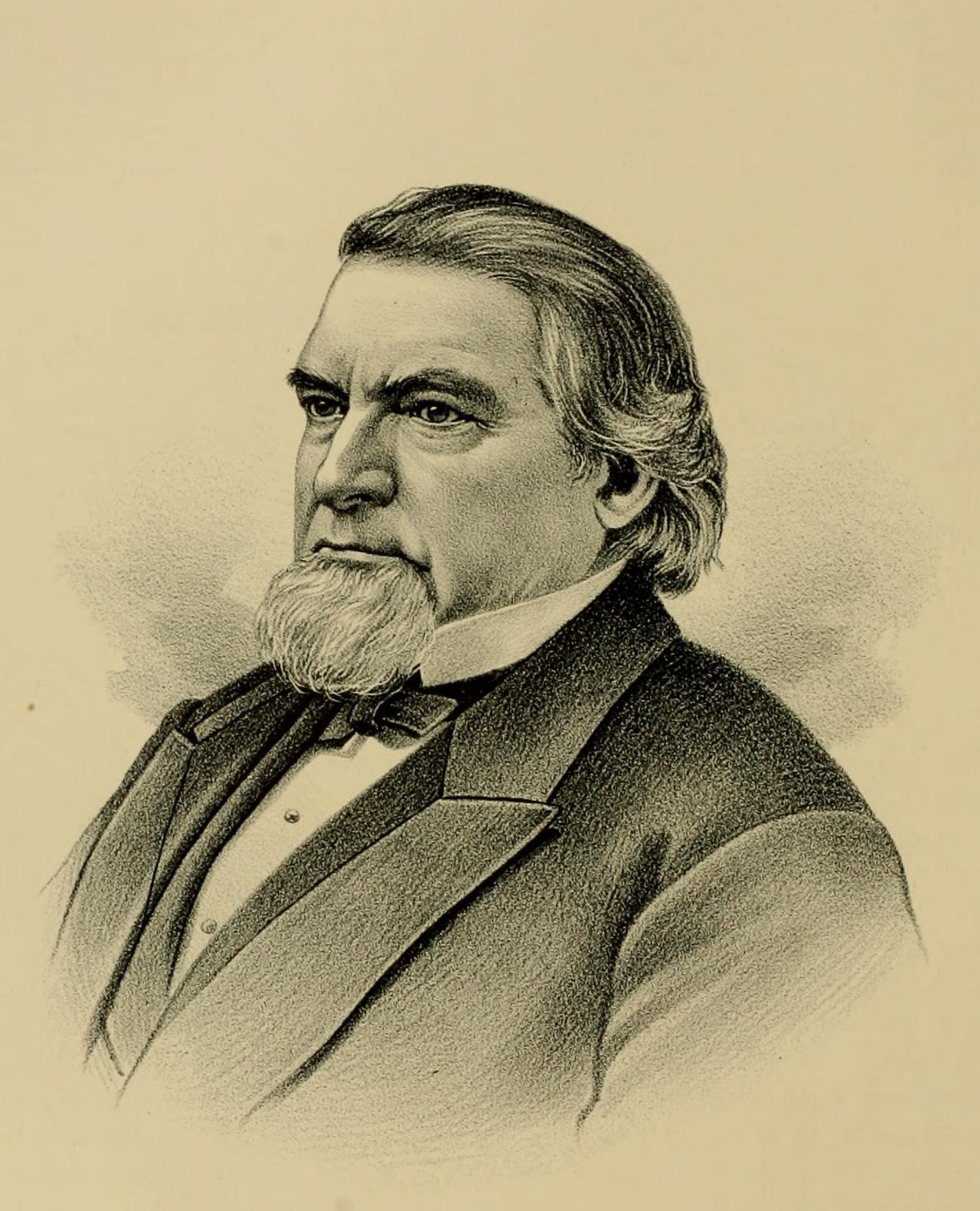

11th Governor of Wisconsin
- In office January 1, 1872 – January 5, 1874
- Lieutenant: Milton Pettit
- Preceded by: Lucius Fairchild
- Succeeded by: William Robert Taylor

Member of the U.S. House of Representatives from Wisconsin
- In office March 4, 1867 – March 3, 1871
- Preceded by: Walter D. McIndoe
- Succeeded by: Jeremiah McLain Rusk
- Constituency: 6th congressional district
- In office March 4, 1855 – March 3, 1861
- Preceded by: Ben C. Eastman
- Succeeded by: Luther Hanchett
- Constituency: 2nd congressional district

Personal details
- Born: April 22, 1818 Livermore, Massachusetts, U.S. (now Maine)
- Died: May 14, 1882 (aged 64) Eureka Springs, Arkansas, U.S.
- Resting place: Oak Grove Cemetery, La Crosse, Wisconsin
- Party: Republican
- Spouse: Jeannette Garr (m. 1849–1882)
- Children: Jeanette Garr (Kelsey)^{(b. 1850; died 1931)}; Frances (Payson)^{(b. 1852; died 1925)}
- Parents: Israel Washburn Sr. (father); Martha (Benjamin) Washburn (mother)
- Relatives: Israel Washburn Jr. (brother); Elihu B. Washburne (brother); William D. Washburn (brother); Charles Ames Washburn (brother); Albert Kelsey (grandson); Dorilus Morrison (cousin); Ganem W. Washburn (cousin)
- Profession: lawyer, politician

Military service
- Allegiance: United States
- Branch/service: United States Volunteers; Union Army
- Years of service: 1862–1865
- Rank: Major General
- Commands: 2nd Reg. Wis. Vol. Cavalry; 1st Div, XIII Corps
- Battles/wars: American Civil War: Battle of Cotton Plant; Vicksburg Campaign; Siege of Vicksburg; Jackson Expedition; Banks' Texas Coast Operations; Battle of Brownsville; Battle of Mustang Island; Battle of Fort Esperanza; Second Battle of Memphis

Cadwallader Colden Washburn (April 22, 1818 – May 14, 1882) was an American businessman, Republican politician, and Wisconsin pioneer. He was the 11th governor of Wisconsin (1872–1874) and served 10 years in the U.S. House of Representatives, representing western Wisconsin. As a businessman, he acquired and grew the Minneapolis Milling Company, creating the business that would later become General Mills. During the American Civil War, Washburn also distinguished himself as a Union Army officer, and rose to the rank of major general, leading forces in the western theater of the war.

Cadwallader Washburn was a member of the Washburn family of Maine. His brother, Israel Washburn Jr., was the 29th governor of Maine, and another brother, William D. Washburn, served as a United States senator from Minnesota. Two other brothers were also notable politicians and diplomats.

== Education and early career ==
Washburn was born in Livermore, Massachusetts (now Livermore, Maine), the son of Martha (née Benjamin) and Israel Washburn Sr. He was one of seven brothers, who included Israel Washburn Jr., Elihu B. Washburne, William D. Washburn, and Charles Ames Washburn. Washburn attended school in Wiscasset, Maine, and later taught there in 1838–1839. In 1839 he moved to Davenport, Iowa Territory, where he taught school, worked in a store, and worked as a surveyor. Inspired by his brother Elihu who set up a legal practice in nearby Galena, Illinois, he studied law. In 1842 he was admitted to the Wisconsin bar and moved to Mineral Point, Iowa County, Wisconsin Territory, where he began a legal practice.

== Business ==
=== Land speculation and banking ===
In 1844, Washburn formed a partnership with land agent Cyrus Woodman. Together the two men developed a number of companies, such as the Wisconsin Mining Company. The most successful business venture undertaken by the men was land acquisition. In May 1855 they established Washburn's and Woodman's Mineral Point Bank. Washburn and Woodman dissolved their partnership amicably in 1855.

=== Minneapolis Mill Company ===
In 1856, the Minneapolis Mill Company was chartered by the Minnesota territorial legislature. Among the incorporators were Washburn's cousin Dorilus Morrison, and Robert Smith, an Illinois congressman who had acquired the rights to the water power at the west side of St. Anthony Falls in Minneapolis. The company struggled initially, and several of the early investors sold out. Washburn bought in and eventually became president. His brother William moved to Minneapolis about that time, and actively managed the company. The company built a dam, a canal and a complex set of water transfer tunnels which were then leased, along with land that the company owned at the foot of the falls, to a variety of mills – cotton mills, woolen mills, sawmills and grist/flour mills. Eventually the work and investment of the two brothers paid off well, and they used their new-found capital to invest in mills themselves.

=== Lumber ===
In 1853, Washburn built a mill at Waubeck on the Chippewa River. In 1859 Washburn moved to La Crosse, Wisconsin, and after his war time service, he engaged in a project to clear the Black River to make it easier to drive logs. In 1871 he formed the La Crosse Lumber Company, which eventually sawed 20,000,000 board feet of lumber annually. He also had the largest shingle mill in the upper Mississippi valley.

=== Flour ===
In 1866, he built his own Washburn "B" Mill, which was thought at the time to be too large to ever turn a profit. However, he succeeded and in 1874 built an even larger Washburn "A" Mill. The original "A" mill complex was destroyed, along with several nearby buildings, in a flour explosion in 1878, but was later rebuilt. In 1877, Washburn teamed with John Crosby to form the Washburn-Crosby Company. At the same time, Washburn sent William Hood Dunwoody to England to open that market for spring wheat. Successful, Dunwoody became a silent partner and went on to become one of the wealthiest millers in the world. Dunwoody became a philanthropist endowing hospitals, educational facilities which became Dunwoody College of Technology, and a charitable home which ultimately became Dunwoody Village. The corporation eventually became known as General Mills.

== Politics and military career ==
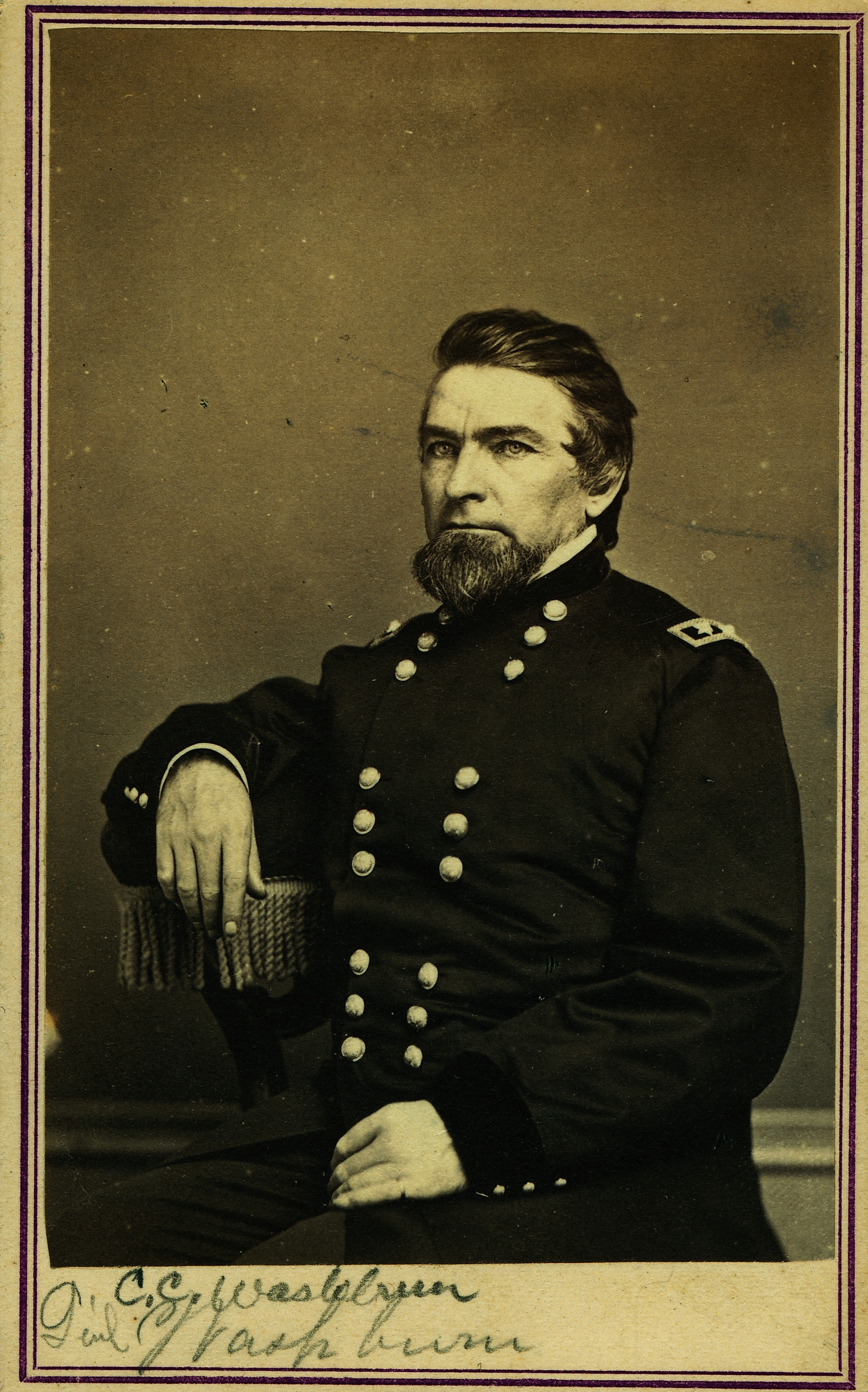

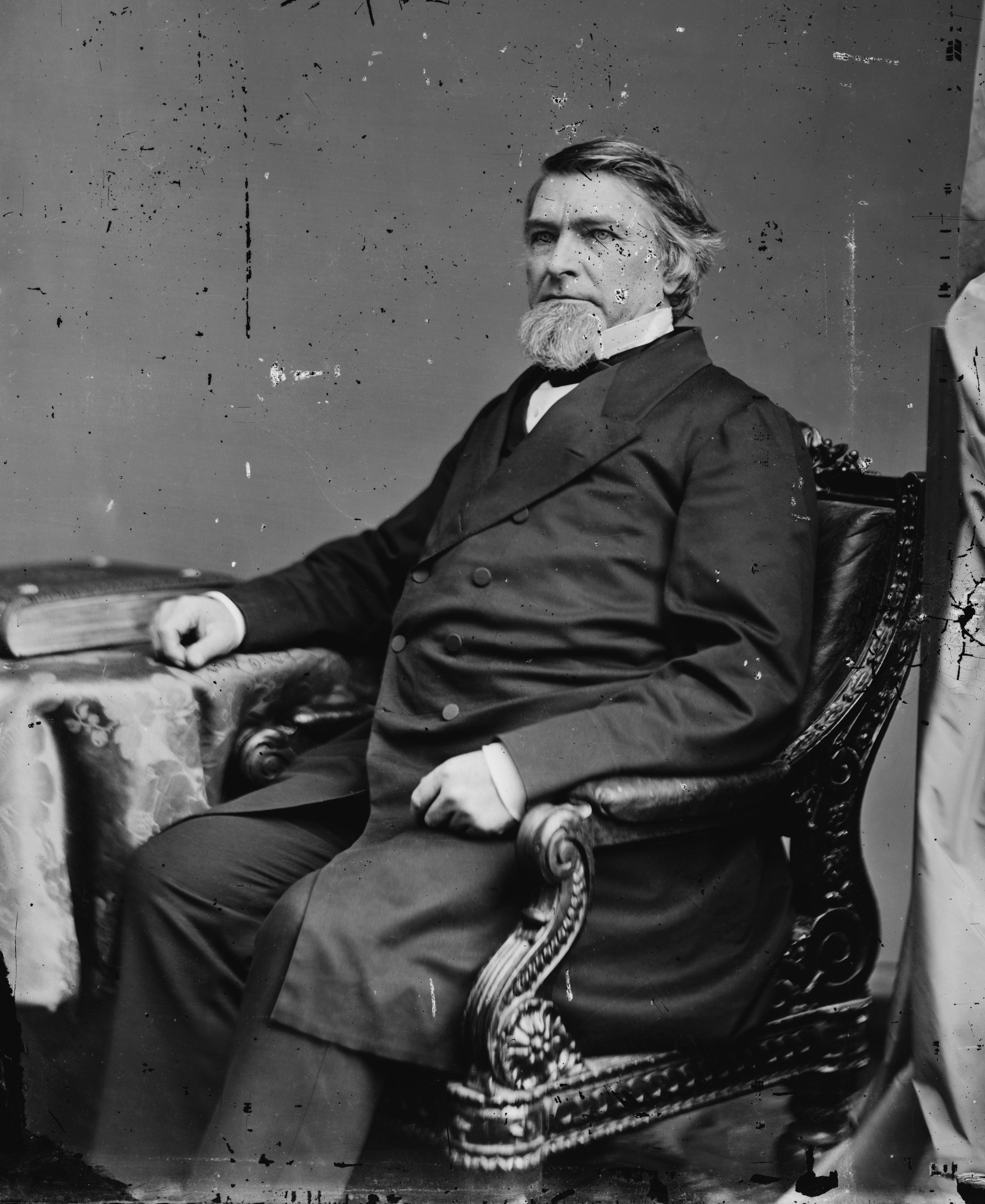

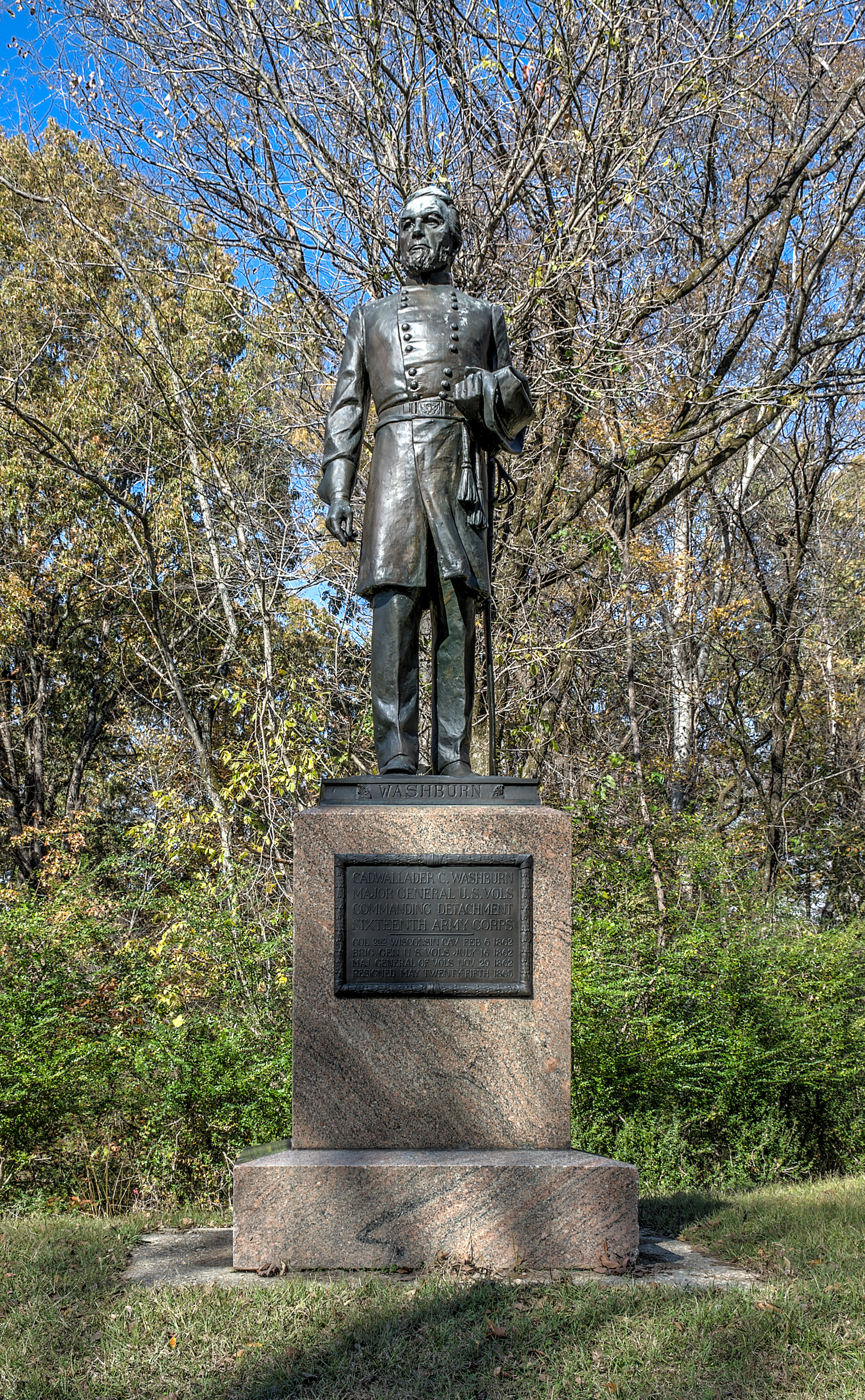
Statue of Washburn at Vicksburg National Military Park by George Brewster

In 1854, Washburn ran for Congress as a Republican, later serving three terms as part of the 34th, 35th and 36th United States Congresses representing Wisconsin's 2nd congressional district, from March 4, 1855, to March 3, 1861. During the 34th Congress, he and his brothers voted for Nathaniel Banks during the protracted 1855-56 House of Representatives Speaker election. In his last term Washburn served as chairman of the Committee on Private Land Claims. He declined to run again in 1860.

The Washburn family had always been strongly opposed to slavery, and as part of the radical wing of the Republican party, Washburn was staunchly opposed to the expansion of slavery. Washburn moved to La Crosse, Wisconsin, in 1861 but returned to Washington, D.C., later that year as a delegate in the peace convention that was held in an attempt to prevent the American Civil War. He served in the Union Army during the Civil War, becoming colonel of the 2nd Wisconsin Volunteer Cavalry, on February 6, 1862; brigadier general of Volunteers on July 16, 1862; and major general on November 29, 1862. Washburn had the honor of having his appointment document signed by President Abraham Lincoln. At one point Ulysses S. Grant called Washburn "one of the best administrative officers we have." He commanded the cavalry of the XIII Corps in the opening stages of Ulysses S. Grant's Vicksburg campaign. Once siege operations had begun against the city of Vicksburg and Grant called for all available forces, Washburn led a detachment of the XVI Corps during the siege of Vicksburg. He commanded the 1st Division in the XIII Corps in Nathanial P. Banks' operations along the Texas Coast leading the expedition against Fort Esperanza in November 1863.

For the rest of the war he served in administrative capacities in Mississippi and Tennessee. While commanding Union forces in Memphis, he was the target of an unsuccessful raid led by Nathan B. Forrest to kidnap him and other Union generals. He left the Union Army on May 25, 1865.

After the conclusion of the war, Washburn returned to his home in La Crosse, where he was elected again for two terms in the House of Representatives. This time he represented Wisconsin's 6th congressional district at the 40th and 41st Congresses from March 4, 1867, to March 3, 1871, where he was chairman of the Committee on Expenditures on Public Buildings in the first term. He declined to run in 1870.

In 1871, he was urged to run for Governor of Wisconsin against James R. Doolittle. Washburn won the election and was inaugurated governor of Wisconsin on the first Monday in January 1872 and served from 1872 to 1874. He ran unsuccessfully for reelection in 1873.

A year later, he purchased the Edgewood Villa estate from Samuel Marshall, where Edgewood College sits today.

== Family life ==
Shortly after his birth in 1818, Washburn was diagnosed with epilepsy.

On January 1, 1849, New Years Day, he married Jeanette Garr, daughter of Andrew Sheffield Garr and Elizabeth Sinclair Garr. Both were 30-years-old at the time. The following year, the couple brought their first daughter, Jeanette (Nettie) Garr Washburn, into the world in 1850. After giving birth to Nettie her mother, Jeanette, started showing signs of mental illness. After Frances (Fanny) was born two years later, in 1852, Washburn made arrangements for his wife's care at the Bloomingdale Asylum. Later she was transferred to an institution in Brookline, Massachusetts, where she remained until her death at the age of 90 in 1909.

== Later life ==
Washburn donated the Edgewood Villa estate to the Sinsinawa Dominican Sisters of Madison, Wisconsin, in 1881. The Edgewood Villa later became Edgewood College and Edgewood High School. Nearly a year later, on May 14, 1882, he died in Eureka Springs, Arkansas, while on a visit to the springs for his health. His body was interred in Oak Grove Cemetery in La Crosse, Wisconsin.

After his death, his estate was valued at an estimated two to three million dollars. In his will, Cadwallader left money to his daughter and other members of his family. A large bequest was made to the city of La Crosse; land was bought and a building for the La Crosse Public Library erected. However, the largest portion was set aside to pay for the care of his wife, Jeanette.

== Legacy ==
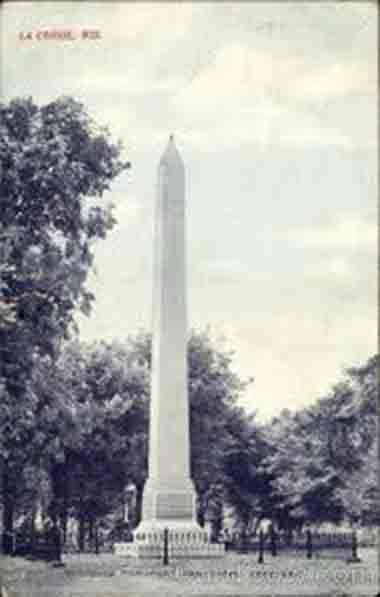
Cadwallader C. Washburn Monument and grave site at Oak Grove Cemetery in La Crosse, Wisconsin.

The city of Washburn in Bayfield County, Wisconsin, was named after Cadwallader Washburn, as were Washburn County in northern Wisconsin and the city of Washburn, North Dakota, As well as, Washburn Center for Children, and Washburn High School in Minneapolis. Washburn Observatory, at the University of Wisconsin–Madison, was also named for Washburn, who as governor, allocated the money for its construction. La Crosse, Wisconsin, where Washburn is laid to rest at his memorial in the Oak Grove Cemetery, has a downtown neighborhood and park named for the former governor and long time resident of the city.

== See also ==
- List of American Civil War generals (Union)
- List of U.S. political families

== Notes ==
Attributions

- Kelsey, Kerck (2005). "C.C. Washburn: The Evolution of a Flour Baron". Wisconsin Magazine of History. 88 (4). State Historical Society of Wisconsin: 38–51.
- Paynter, Mary O. P. (2002). Phoenix from the Fire: A History of Edgewood College. Madison, WI: Edgewood College. ISBN 978-0971810600.
- Atwater, Isaac (1893). History of the City of Minneapolis, Minnesota – Vol. II. New York: Munsell & Company.

== Other references ==
- United States Congress. "Cadwallader C. Washburn (id: W000170)". Biographical Directory of the United States Congress. Retrieved on 2008-10-30
- Our milling roots and beyond Archived December 11, 2006, at the Wayback Machine, General Mills
- Cadwallader C. Washburn Archived March 4, 2016, at the Wayback Machine, Wisconsin State Historical Society

Party political offices
Preceded by Lucius Fairchild	Republican nominee for Governor of Wisconsin; 1871, 1873	Succeeded by Harrison Ludington
U.S. House of Representatives
Preceded by Ben C. Eastman	Member of the U.S. House of Representatives from Wisconsin's 2nd congressional district March 4, 1855 – March 3, 1861	Succeeded by Luther Hanchett
Preceded by Walter D. McIndoe	Member of the U.S. House of Representatives from Wisconsin's 6th congressional district March 4, 1867 – March 3, 1871	Succeeded by Jeremiah McLain Rusk
Political offices
Preceded by Lucius Fairchild	Governor of Wisconsin; 1872 – 1874	Succeeded by William Robert Taylor
