= C. Langhorne Washburn =

C. Langhorne Washburn (1918 in Livermore Falls, Maine – March 4, 2011, in Middleburg, Virginia) was an American political activist. He attended The Hotchkiss School and entered the University of Virginia in 1939. He enlisted in the United States Navy Reserve in 1941 and served in the Pacific before leaving the Navy in 1945.

In 1947, Washburn joined Hiller Aircraft and served as assistant to the president until 1954. While in this position, he worked with several grassroots organizations towards the election of Dwight D. Eisenhower to the office of President of the United States. Washburn cofounded Young Industry for Eisenhower in 1952 and served as director of the group’s pre-convention, convention and campaign activities. He also served as director of special events for the National Citizens for Eisenhower and was organizer and chairman of the Eisenhower Bandwagon Operation. In 1954, he served as vice-chairman in charge of operations for the National Citizens for Eisenhower Congressional Committee.

In 1955, following his departure from Hiller Aircraft, Washburn began work with the Subcommittee on Program Planning for the 1956 Republican National Convention. The following year would see him made director of campaign activities for the Eisenhower Bandwagon Operation.

In 1956, Washburn returned to private life and worked for a variety of organizations, including Bernard Relin and Associates and Towne-Oller Associates. From 1960 to 1961 he served as president of the Automated Preference Testing Corporation before stepping down to serve as vice-president of the A.C. Nelson Company until 1964.

Washburn returned to political activism in 1964 and served as the director of finance for the Nelson Rockefeller for President Committee. That same year also saw him serve as director of finance for the Republican National Congressional Committee and as executive director of the Republican Congressional Boosters Club. From 1965 to 1969, Washburn served as director of finance for the Republican National Finance Committee.

In 1969, Washburn entered Federal service by working as director of the U.S. Travel Service for the United States Department of Commerce. From 1970 to 1975 he served as Assistant Secretary of Commerce for Tourism. In 1977 he served as commissioner of the President’s National Tourism Resources Review Commission, chairman of the Soviet-U.S. Tourism Mission and a member of the board of directors, Discover America Travel Organizations, Inc.

In 1978, Washburn served as Vice-President for Disney's Experimental Prototype Community of Tomorrow.

He died at his home in Middleburg, Virginia, on March 4, 2011
