= Reuel Washburn =

American judge and politician (1793–1878)

Reuel Washburn (May 21, 1793 – March 4, 1878) was an American judge and politician.

== Education and early career ==
Reuel Washburn was born in Raynham, Massachusetts, on May 21, 1793. His father was Attorney Israel Washburn II, LLD (1755–1851) and his mother was Abiah King (1762–1842). He graduated from Brown University in 1815, then studied law in Paris, Maine, under Albion Parris. He was admitted to the Maine bar and moved to Livermore, Maine, to practice law.

== Political career ==
In 1827 and 1828, Reuel Washburn served in the Maine State Senate. In 1829, Washburn served on the Maine Governor's Council. From 1832 to 1835 and 1841, Reuel Washburn served in the Maine House of Representatives. He also served as probate court judge. Reuel Washburn unsuccessfully ran thrice for election to the United States House of Representatives.

== Family background ==
His father, Israel Washburn II, also served in the Maine Legislature. His brother, Israel Washburn III, was a Massachusetts politician who served twice in the Massachusetts House of Representatives (Terms of Office - 1815–1816 & 1818–1819). He married Delia King in Raynham, Massachusetts, in 1820 His son was Ganem W. Washburn, Wisconsin State Senator and circuit court judge.

He died suddenly in Livermore, Maine March 4, 1878.

His son was Ganem W. Washburn, Wisconsin State Senator and circuit court judge.
