= Livermore, Maine =

Town in Maine, United States

- Town
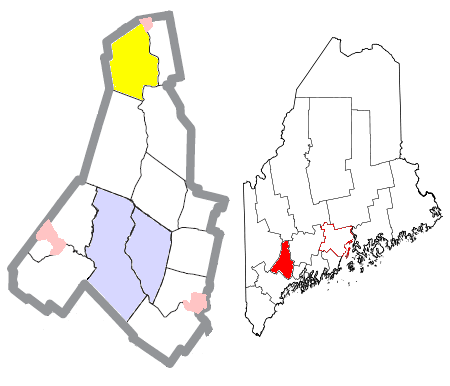
- Location of Livermore (in yellow) in Androscoggin County and the state of Maine
- Coordinates: 44°23′31″N 70°13′48″W
- Country: United States
- State: Maine
- County: Androscoggin
- Villages: Livermore; Livermore Center; North Livermore; South Livermore

Area
  - Total: 39.40 sq mi (102.05 km^{2})
  - Land: 37.62 sq mi (97.44 km^{2})
  - Water: 1.78 sq mi (4.61 km^{2})
- Elevation: 535 ft (163 m)

Population (2020)
  - Total: 2,127
  - Density: 56/sq mi (21.8/km^{2})
- Time zone: UTC-5 (Eastern (EST))
  - Summer (DST): UTC-4 (EDT)
- ZIP code: 04253
- Area code: 207
- FIPS code: 23-40665
- GNIS feature ID: 582566
- Website: www.livermoremaine.org

Livermore is a town in Androscoggin County, Maine, United States, formerly in Oxford County, Maine. The population was 2,127 at the 2020 United States census. It is included in both the Lewiston-Auburn, Maine, Metropolitan Statistical Area and the Lewiston-Auburn, Maine, Metropolitan New England City and Town Area. High schools students from Livermore attend Spruce Mountain High School in neighboring Livermore Falls. Livermore is known for The Norlands, the Washburn family home.

== History ==
Livermore was incorporated in 1795, the northwestern-most town of Androscoggin County. In 1880, the population was 1,262. In 2010, the population was 2,095. Livermore had originally been a grant from the state of Massachusetts to certain people for services in an expedition, which was against Port Royal. The town was named for Deacon Elijah Livermore, a pioneer settler born in Waltham, Massachusetts. The first two settlers of Livermore are known to be Deacon Ellijah Livermore and Major Thomas Fish. Major Thomas Fish had originally been from Worcester County, Oxford, Massachusetts. Major Thomas Fish went to war in 1775, and he was a Major in the Continental Army. Major Thomas Fish had died on December 20, 1781, in Livermore, Maine. Deacon Ellijah Livermore had arrived in 1779, building the first mill near Long Pond in 1782. In 1795 as Livermore familiarized, a county line was established based on the Androscoggin River. The Androscoggin River divides East Livermore and Leeds on the east and southeast. On the south of the river is Turner, on the west side is Canton and Hartford, and on the north side is Jay and Canton. From 1760 to 1805, Livermore had been in Cumberland and Lincoln Counties. In 1805, the town became part of Oxford County. By the act of East Livermore, Livermore was separated from Oxford County and became part of the Kennebec County. On March 1, 1844, the town of East Livermore had been incorporated in the Kennebec County, but by 1854, Livermore, along with Livermore Falls, had joined newly formed Androscoggin County. The county line had determined the east of the river as the Kennebec County, and the west part of the Oxford County. On March 31, 1854, the towns of Turner and Livermore officially set off from Oxford County to the Androscoggin County.

Early 19th century in Livermore, Maine, had mostly consisted of farmland which provided products such as dairy to numerous markets around the New England area. As the 19th century progressed, Livermore had quickly advanced New England's lifestyle through their farmland and involvement to the mills. As the industrial revolution developed, this small town in Maine had progressed important roles such as the paper mills, logging, and lumber. Livermore is well known for its long and round ponds, which are located in the northern part of town.

The first church in Livermore was established in 1793. Today, the town of Livermore now has Universalist, Methodist, Baptist and Free Baptist churches. Livermore, Maine, today has seventeen schoolhouses, which are worth about $4,000. In 1880, the noted citizens of Livermore, Maine, were Jonathan G. Hunton, General David Learned, the governor of Maine, Reuel Washburn.

The small town of Livermore, Maine, is still recognized and well known for the Washburn- Norlands Living History Center on 290 Norlands Rd, also known as the Israel Washburn Homestead. The Washburn- Norlands foundation supports the Washburn family and descendants. This foundation had converted the Washburn home into a historical museum to provide the community with remarkable stories of the 19th and 20th century and with the intent to preserve the land and buildings. The Norlands Living History center's buildings such as the 1867 mansion, 1853 school house, 1828 meeting house, and 1883 library are all still in use today. The Washburn home still includes the families memories and documents such as historical clothing, photographs, furniture, books, family papers and artwork. The Norlands offers the community to experience life as it was in Maine in the 18th and 19th century. The Norlands is a family home of Israel Washburn, one of the many industrial and political rulers of the 19th century. Opened in 1821, today the Norlands is a popular historical museum in which offers a variety of activities to experience the rural life of the Washburn family. The Norlands Living History Center buildings includes the famous Norlands mansion, a 19th-century schoolhouse, a library specifically for the Washburn family, a barn for farm animals, a meeting house and a farmers cottage. In April 2008, the farmers cottage and barn tragically burned down. In early 2011, the farmers cottage was rebuilt and reopened to the public. The barn has yet to be rebuilt as of July 2012.

== Geography ==
According to the United States Census Bureau, the town has a total area of 39.40 square miles (102.05 km^{2}), of which 37.62 square miles (97.44 km^{2}) is land and 1.78 square miles (4.61 km^{2}) is water.

Political Boundary Changes Concerning the Land of Livermore
1630 – Massachusetts founded
1652 – Yorkshire County established
1668 – Yorkshire County renamed to York County
1760 – Cumberland County was founded from a portion of York County.
1772 – Land Grant of Livermore
1795 – Organization and incorporation of Livermore
1805 – Oxford County was established
1820 – Maine became a state

1854 – Androscoggin County was established

1854 – Town of East Livermore established

=== Bodies of Water ===
Livermore is home to five lakes and ponds, the largest of which is Long Pond.

List of Lakes and Ponds in Livermore Maine
Name of Lake or Pond	Area in Acres	Other Adjoining Towns or Cities
Bartlett Pond	26	none
Brettun's Pond	165	none
Long Pond	208	none
Nelson Pond	18	Canton
Round Pond	161	none

== Demographics ==
Historical population
Census	Pop.	Note	%±
1800	863		—
1810	1,560		80.8%
1820	2,174		39.4%
1830	2,453		12.8%
1840	2,745		11.9%
1850	1,764		−35.7%
1860	1,597		−9.5%
1870	1,467		−8.1%
1880	1,262		−14.0%
1890	1,151		−8.8%
1900	1,125		−2.3%
1910	1,100		−2.2%
1920	1,064		−3.3%
1930	1,113		4.6%
1940	1,302		17.0%
1950	1,313		0.8%
1960	1,363		3.8%
1970	1,610		18.1%
1980	1,826		13.4%
1990	1,950		6.8%
2000	2,106		8.0%
2010	2,095		−0.5%
2020	2,127		1.5%
U.S. Decennial Census

=== 2010 census ===
As of the census of 2010, there were 2,095 people, 889 households, and 620 families residing in the town. The population density was 55.7 inhabitants per square mile (21.5/km^{2}). There were 1,127 housing units at an average density of 30.0 units per square mile (11.6 units/km^{2}). The racial makeup of the town was 98.5% White, 0.1% African American, 0.3% Native American, 0.1% Asian, 0.2% from other races, and 0.8% from two or more races. Hispanic or Latino of any race were 1.0% of the population.

There were 889 households, of which 27.0% had children under the age of 18 living with them, 57.0% were married couples living together, 7.4% had a female householder with no husband present, 5.3% had a male householder with no wife present, and 30.3% were non-families. 24.5% of all households were made up of individuals, and 10.1% had someone living alone who was 65 years of age or older. The average household size was 2.36 and the average family size was 2.77.

The median age in the town was 44.4 years. 20.2% of residents were under the age of 18; 6.6% were between the ages of 18 and 24; 24.1% were from 25 to 44; 32.5% were from 45 to 64; and 16.6% were 65 years of age or older. The gender makeup of the town was 50.7% male and 49.3% female.

=== 2000 census ===
As of the census of 2000, there were 2,106 people, 842 households, and 602 families residing in the town. The population density was 55.9 inhabitants per square mile (21.6/km^{2}). There were 1,066 housing units at an average density of 28.3 units per square mile (10.9 units/km^{2}). The racial makeup of the town was 99.00% White, 0.24% African American, 0.05% Native American, and 0.71% from two or more races. Hispanic or Latino of any race were 0.33% of the population.

There were 842 households, out of which 30.2% had children under the age of 18 living with them, 60.1% were married couples living together, 6.5% had a female householder with no husband present, and 28.5% were non-families. 23.8% of all households were made up of individuals, and 8.9% had someone living alone who was 65 years of age or older. The average household size was 2.50 and the average family size was 2.93.

In the town, the population was spread out, with 23.9% under the age of 18, 6.1% from 18 to 24, 30.0% from 25 to 44, 26.5% from 45 to 64, and 13.5% who were 65 years of age or older. The median age was 39 years. For every 100 females, there were 111.2 males. For every 100 females age 18 and over, there were 105.0 males.

The median income for a household in the town was $38,850, and the median income for a family was $44,904. Males had a median income of $32,898 versus $25,208 for females. The per capita income for the town was $17,706. About 2.0% of families and 5.1% of the population were below the poverty line, including 4.3% of those under age 18 and 2.8% of those age 65 or over.

== Education ==
Livermore is a member town of RSU #73, which also includes the towns of Livermore Falls and Jay. Spruce Mountain High School is a public high school in Jay, Maine, which serves education for students of Jay, Livermore and Livermore Falls since 2011. Spruce Mountain High School is a result of the consolidation between the Jay School Department and RSU #36. The name "Spruce Mountain" comes from a local ski slope, located in Jay Maine. This popular ski slope in the small community is home to many students and residents of all three towns in the winter, which makes the name appropriate for the school district name. Spruce Mountain colors are Black, Green and White, and the mascot is the Phoenix.

== Notable people ==
- Elijah Hamlin, mayor of Bangor, Maine
- Timothy O. Howe, US senator from Wisconsin
- Dorilus Morrison, first mayor of Minneapolis, cousin of the Washburn family
- Cadwallader Colden Washburn (1818–1882), Civil War era general, 11th governor of Wisconsin, namesake of Washburn County
- Charles Ames Washburn (1822–1889), diplomatic commissioner to Paraguay (1861–1863), minister to Paraguay (1863–1868), invented an early typewriter
- Elihu B. Washburne (1816–1887), US congressman from Illinois (1853–1869), Minister to France during the Franco-Prussian War and the Paris Commune, 25th United States Secretary of State (1869)
- Ganem W. Washburn (1823–1907), Wisconsin State Senator and judge, cousin of the Washburn family
- Israel Washburn, Jr. (1813–1883), Maine state congressmen (1842); US congressmen, (1851–1861); 29th governor of Maine
- William D. Washburn (1831–1912), state congressman (1861), US congressmen (1879–1885) and senator for Minnesota (1889–1895)
