= Elihu B. Washburne =

American politician (1816–1887)

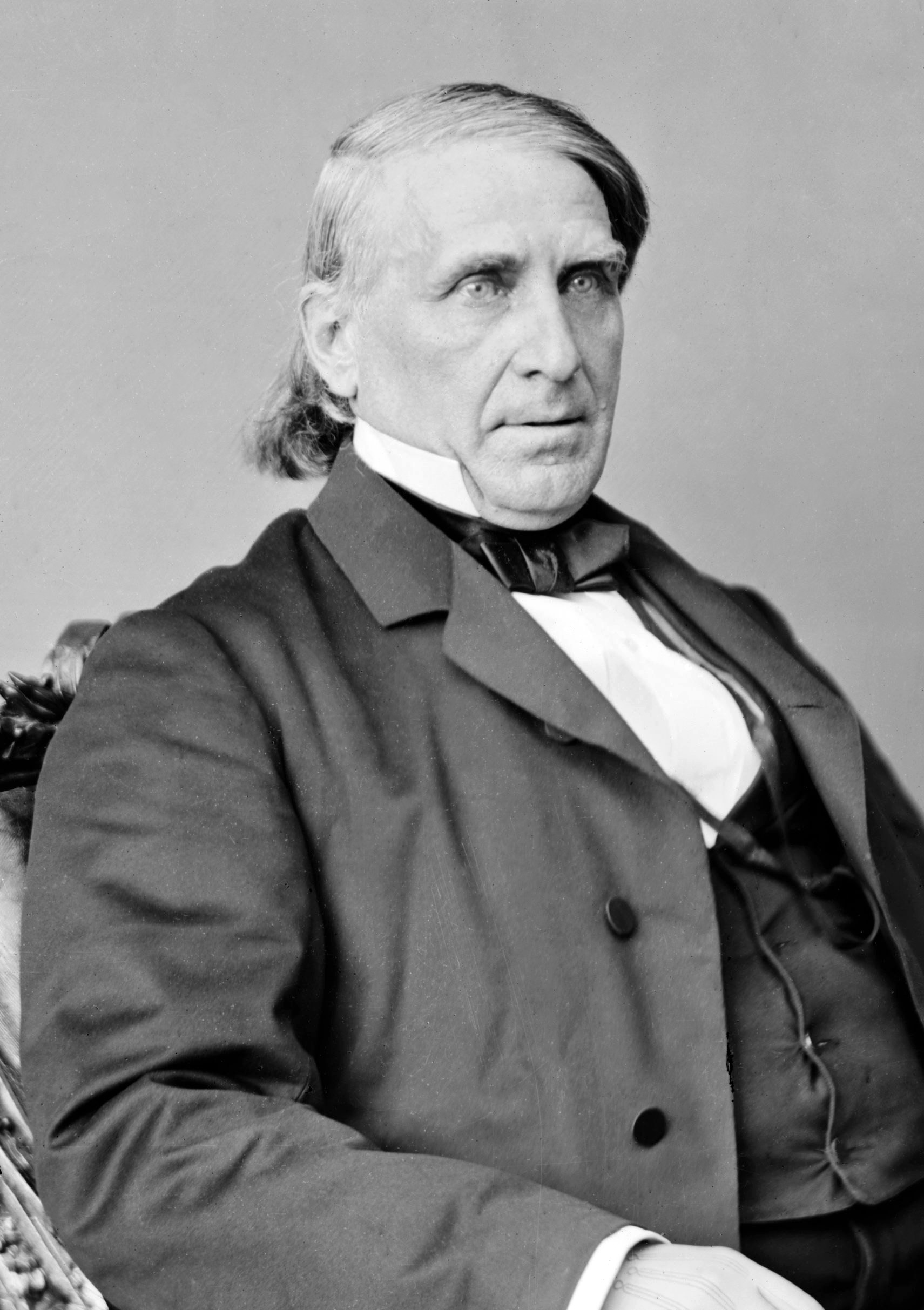
- Washburne, 1860–1875

23rd United States Minister to France
- In office May 23, 1869 – September 5, 1877
- President: Ulysses S. Grant; Rutherford B. Hayes
- Preceded by: John Dix
- Succeeded by: Edward F. Noyes

25th United States Secretary of State
- In office March 5, 1869 – March 16, 1869
- President: Ulysses S. Grant
- Preceded by: William H. Seward
- Succeeded by: Hamilton Fish

Dean of the United States House of Representatives
- In office March 4, 1863 – March 6, 1869
- Preceded by: John S. Phelps
- Succeeded by: Henry L. Dawes

Member of the U.S. House of Representatives from Illinois
- In office March 4, 1853 – March 6, 1869
- Preceded by: William Bissell
- Succeeded by: Horatio C. Burchard
- Constituency: 1st district (1853–63); 3rd district (1863–69)

Personal details
- Born: Elihu Benjamin Washburne; September 23, 1816 Livermore, Massachusetts (now Maine), U.S.
- Died: October 22, 1887 (aged 71) Chicago, Illinois, U.S.
- Resting place: Greenwood Cemetery, Galena, Illinois
- Party: Whig (before 1856); Republican (1856–1887)
- Spouse: Adele Gratiot
- Children: 7, including Hempstead
- Education: Maine Wesleyan Seminary; Harvard University

Elihu Benjamin Washburne (September 23, 1816 – October 22, 1887) was an American politician. A member of the Washburn family, which played a prominent role in the early formation of the United States Republican Party, he served as a congressman from Illinois before, during and after the American Civil War. He was a political ally of President Abraham Lincoln and General (later President) Ulysses S. Grant. During Grant's administration, Washburne was the 25th United States Secretary of State briefly in 1869, and was the United States Minister to France from 1869 to 1877.

In his youth, when his family became destitute, Washburne left home in Maine at the age of 14, to support himself and further his education. After working for newspapers in Maine and studying law, Washburne passed the bar and moved to Galena, Illinois, where he became a partner in a successful law firm. Washburne was elected to the U.S. House of Representatives in 1852 and served from 1853 to 1869, which included the American Civil War and the first part of Reconstruction. While advocating Lincoln's war policy, Washburne sponsored an up-and-coming Grant; they were acquainted because Grant had moved to Galena shortly before the war to work in his father's leather goods business. Washburne advocated for Grant's promotions in the Union Army, and protected him from critics in Washington and in the field. Washburne was Grant's advocate in Congress throughout the war, and their friendship and association lasted through Grant's two terms as president.

As a leader of the Radical Republicans, Washburne opposed the Reconstruction policies of President Andrew Johnson and supported African American suffrage and civil rights. Washburne was appointed United States Secretary of State in 1869 by President Grant, out of respect for his championship of Grant's career during the Civil War, and to give Washburne diplomatic clout after being appointed minister to France. Washburne's tenure as Secretary of State lasted for only eleven days, but he served in France for eight years, where he became known for diplomatic integrity and his humanitarian support of Americans, other neutrals, and Germans in France during the Franco-Prussian War. For his efforts, he received formal praise from governments in both France and Germany. Washburne's friendship with Grant ended after the contentious 1880 Republican convention, when Washburne was a candidate for president. He did not garner wide support, but Grant had been the front runner for an unprecedented third term, and was disappointed when the party eventually turned to dark horse James A. Garfield. In retirement, Washburne published a biography of anti-slavery politician Edward Coles, and a memoir of his own diplomatic career in France.

== Early life, education, and legal career ==
Elihu Washburne was born on September 23, 1816, in Livermore, when Maine was part of Massachusetts. He was the third oldest of eleven children born to Israel and Martha (née Benjamin) Washburn. Washburne was the grandson of Captain Israel and Abiah (King) Washburne. His grandfather served as an officer in the Continental Army during the American Revolution and was a descendant of John Washburne, who served as Secretary of the Plymouth Colony while in England. John Washburne was a Puritan colonist who emigrated to America in 1631 and settled in Duxbury, Massachusetts.

Washburne's father settled in Maine in 1806 and set up a shipbuilding trade at Whites Landing on the Kennebec River in 1808. Following Puritan heritage, Israel was a strict disciplinarian and Washburne and his siblings were instructed in the Bible and put to work daily in the fields and on other chores, with no time for leisure. During the winter months Washburne attended district schools that used "birch rod" corporal punishment. Washburne's family fell on financial hard times in 1829, and his father, who was then in the mercantile business, was forced to sell his general store. The family was destitute and forced to rely on farming for subsistence, while Washburne and several of his brothers had to fend for themselves. At the age of 14, Washburne added the letter "e" to his name, as was the original ancestral spelling, and left home in search of education and a career.

After attending public schools, Washburne worked as a printer on the Christian Intelligencer in Gardiner, Maine, from 1833 to 1834. From 1834 to 1835 Washburne taught school and from 1835 to 1836 he worked for the Kennebec Journal in Augusta, Maine. Washburne attended Maine Wesleyan Seminary, studied law with Judge John Otis, and completed his legal studies with a year at Harvard Law School from 1839 to 1840. In 1840 he passed the bar exam, and moved west to Galena, Illinois. In Galena, Washburne entered into law partnership with Charles S. Hempstead.

== Marriage and family ==
On July 31, 1845, Washburne married Adele Gratiot, the niece of his law partner and the daughter of Colonel Henry Gratiot and Susan Hempstead Gratiot, members of one of Galena's most prominent families. Washburne had met Adele shortly after arriving in Galena; she was 10 years younger than Washburne, and known to be attractive, well-educated, and charming. The Washburnes had seven children including sons Gratiot, Hempstead, William P., and Elihu B. Jr., and daughters Susan and Marie L. The Washburnes were married for 42 years, which ended with Adele Washburne's death, 7 months before Elihu’s passing.

== U.S. Congressman (1853–1869) ==
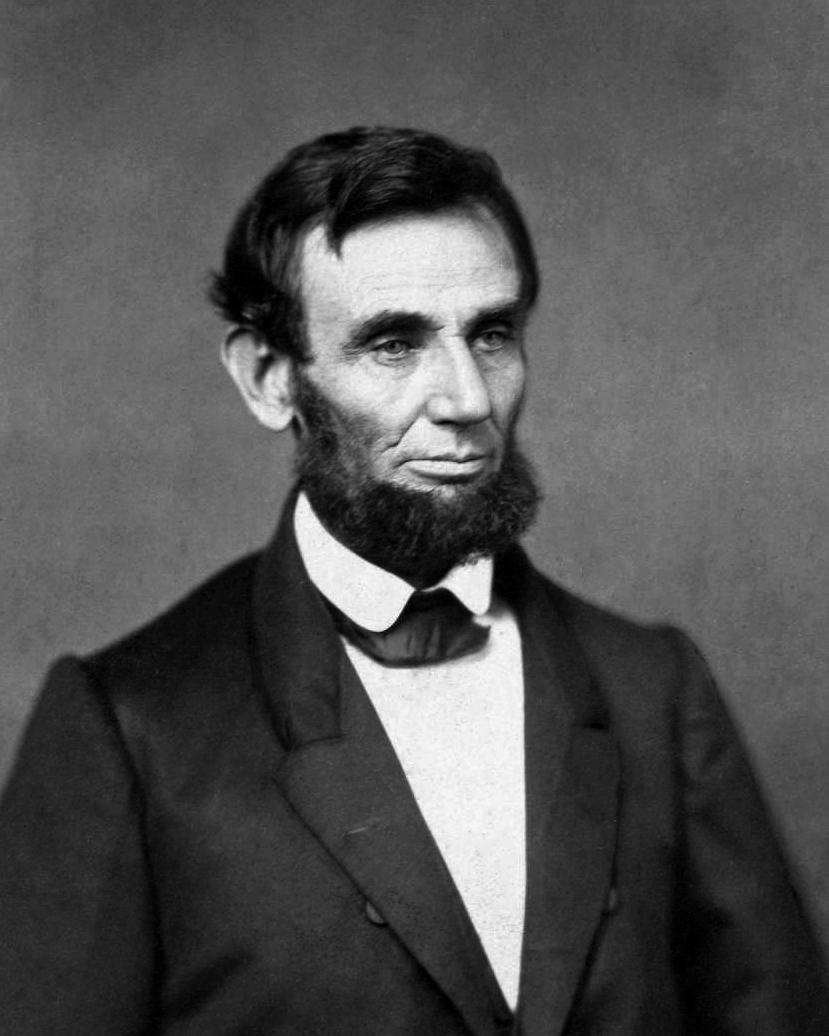
Washburne, a political ally, welcomed president-elect Abraham Lincoln upon his 1861 arrival in Washington D.C.

Washburne became active in politics as a Whig, and served as a delegate to the Whig National Convention in 1844 and again in 1852. In 1848 he was an unsuccessful candidate for Congress.

In 1852, Washburne was elected to the United States House of Representatives. He was reelected eight times, and represented northwestern Illinois from 1853 to 1869. While in Congress, Washburne was chairman of the Committee on Commerce (34th Congress, and 36th through 40th Congresses), and the Committee on Appropriations (40th Congress).

In 1854 Washburne supported Abraham Lincoln's unsuccessful candidacy for the United States Senate. In the mid-1850s the Whig Party dissolved, and the Republican Party was founded as the major anti-slavery party. Washburne joined the Republican Party, and in 1856 supported its first candidate for president, John C. Frémont.

Washburne backed Lincoln's unsuccessful candidacy for the United States Senate in 1858. In 1860, Washburne enthusiastically supported Lincoln's successful presidential campaign.

=== American Civil War ===
During Lincoln's presidency Washburne supported the Union. As a trusted friend, he advised Lincoln informally, and kept him abreast of political news from Illinois.

As Lincoln made his way to Washington, D.C., in early 1861 to begin his presidential term, his supporters feared an assassination attempt. Washburne consulted Winfield Scott, the commander of the Army, who increased security in Washington and the surrounding area. Lincoln arrived in Washington incognito on February 23, 1861, and Washburne was on hand to meet him.

=== Sponsored Ulysses S. Grant ===
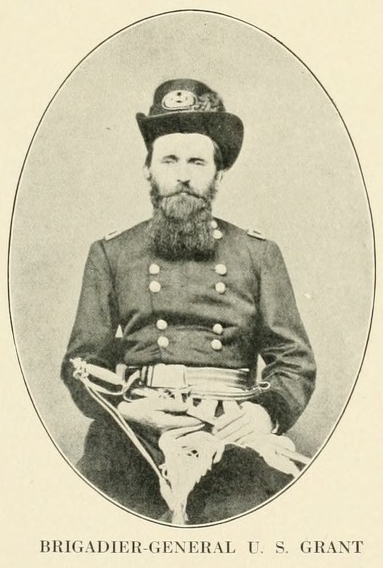
In 1861 Washburne began his sponsorship of Ulysses S. Grant during the Civil War.

Washburne was one of only a few men in Washington, D.C., who had previously known Ulysses S. Grant, a fellow resident of Galena. Grant was a graduate of West Point and had served in the Army for eleven years, including the Mexican–American War. Initially, Grant and Washburne seemed like an odd political pairing; Grant was a Douglas Democrat and Washburne an ardent abolitionist and founder of the Republican Party. Despite those differences, Washburne became an early and ardent Grant supporter, and helped secure his promotions to the general officer ranks.

Though Grant had no rank or commission at the start of the war, he took the initiative to recruit a company of volunteers in Galena, and accompanied them to Springfield, the state capital. Grant discussed with Washburne his hope that his West Point education and previous military experience would lead to a field command; Washburne promised to discuss the matter with Governor Richard Yates. Yates quickly offered Grant a militia commission to serve as mustering officer and continue training the volunteer units which were being raised to rapidly expand the Army. Grant accepted, but continued his efforts to obtain a field command.

With Washburne's sponsorship, Grant was commissioned a colonel of volunteers on June 14, 1861, and appointed to command the 21st Illinois Volunteer Infantry Regiment. During his command of the regiment and through the Vicksburg Campaign, Washburne kept in close touch with Grant through his brother, Major General Cadwallader C. Washburn.

Washburne continued as Grant's advocate and defender in Washington. In September 1861, Washburne sponsored Grant's promotion to brigadier general and command of a brigade, and supported his subsequent promotion to major general and assignments to district, field army, and military division command. Washburne was also an advocate for Grant's promotion to lieutenant general and command of the entire Union Army. During the war, Grant aligned himself with the Republican goals of ending slavery and incorporating African Americans into the military. His changed political outlook and success on the battlefield made him a likely contender for president as a Republican, and Washburne supported Grant's successful campaign in 1868. Grant was in Washburne's home in Galena when he heard the news of his election.

=== Investigation into Western War Department ===
During the first months of the Civil War under President Lincoln, Washburne launched an investigation into corruption charges of General John C. Frémont's Western War Department. Lincoln had appointed Frémont commander of the Western War Department in July 1861. Rumors spread of a "horde of pirates" under Frémont's authority of defrauding the army and the federal government and that Frémont himself was "extravagant". Washburne's investigation revealed that Frémont had awarded his California associates with lucrative army contracts. Also Frémont had favored sellers who were given exorbitant contracts for railroad cars, horses, mules, tents, and equipment that was inferior in quality. In October, Lincoln relieved Frémont of command on corruption charges and for insubordination.

=== Radical Republican leader ===
Washburne became a leader of the Radical Republicans, those most ardently opposed to slavery, and was among the original proponents of racial equality. As a congressman, he served on the Joint Committee on Reconstruction which drafted the Fourteenth Amendment to the United States Constitution. After the Civil War, Washburne advocated that large plantations be divided up to provide compensatory property for freed slaves.

== Secretary of State and Minister to France (1869–1877) ==
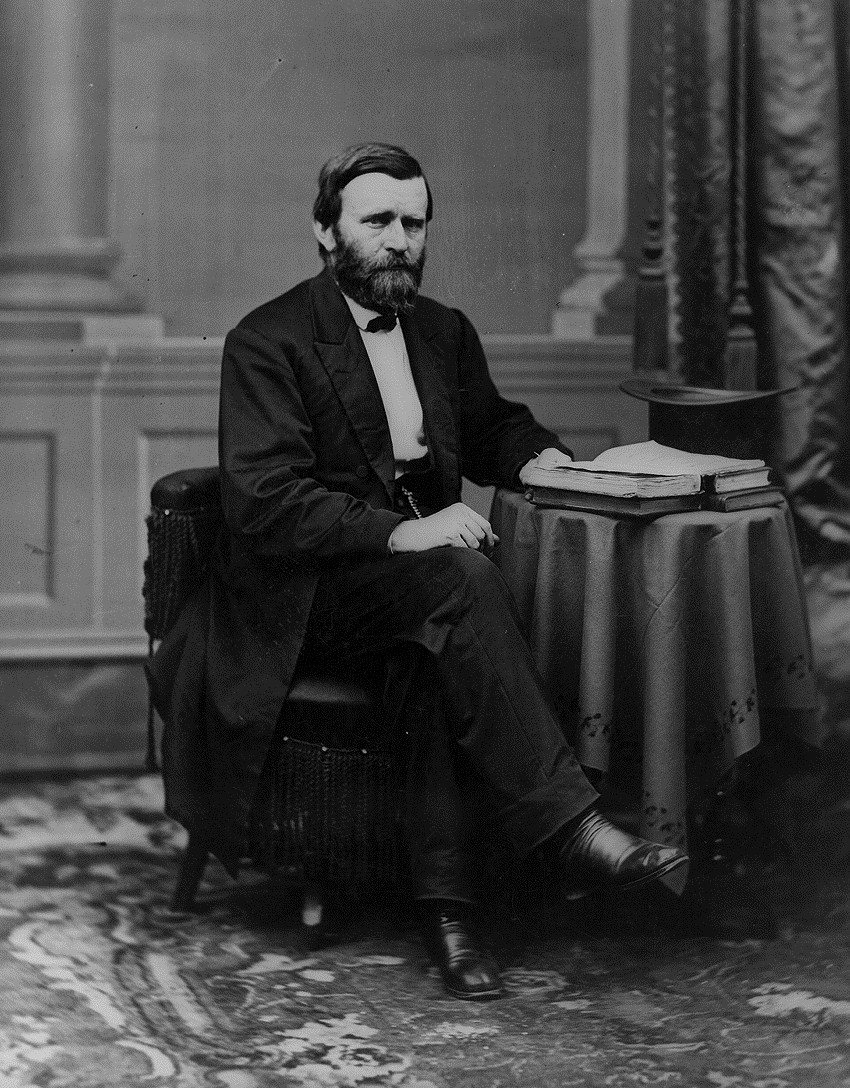
President Grant in 1869

When Grant became president in 1869, he appointed Washburne to succeed William H. Seward as Secretary of State, with the understanding that he would hold the post only briefly and then serve as minister to France. Washburne had been ill and confined to his home all through February, and told Grant that his "health would prevent [him] from holding the position for any length of time." He took the position on March 5, wrote his resignation letter on March 10, and left office on March 15 after his successor, Hamilton Fish, arrived from New York to take the position. His term remains the shortest of any Secretary of State. The Department sent 22 nominations to the Senate during his tenure.

As Minister to France, Washburne played a major diplomatic and humanitarian role during the Franco-Prussian War. This was the first major war in which all belligerents appointed protecting powers to represent their interests in enemy capitals, and the United States agreed to be the protecting power for the North German Confederation and several of the German states. Washburne arranged for railroad transportation to evacuate 30,000 German civilians who had been living in France, and was responsible for feeding 3,000 Germans during the Siege of Paris. Although the State Department gave him permission to evacuate the American Legation at his discretion, Washburne chose to remain in Paris throughout the war and the Commune of Paris.

Washburne was the only diplomat from a major power to remain in the French capital through the Siege of Paris. As protecting power, he transmitted messages between the French and German governments. He was permitted by the Germans to receive sealed diplomatic communications from outside the city, a privilege that was denied to the smaller neutrals. Washburne was also entrusted with the protection of seven Latin American consulates that lacked diplomatic representation in France. The French Republic finally exchanged chargés d'affaires with the German Empire in June 1871, after an eleven-month breach in diplomatic relations between France and Germany. Washburne, who had lost 17 pounds during the ordeal, returned immediately to the Carlsbad springs to recuperate; he had been visiting the springs when he learned of the start of the war.

Washburne's tireless efforts set a precedent for the role of protecting power in future wars. He received special honors from German Emperor Wilhelm I and German Chancellor Otto von Bismarck, as well as from the French leaders Léon Gambetta and Adolphe Thiers.

== Presidential candidate (1880) ==
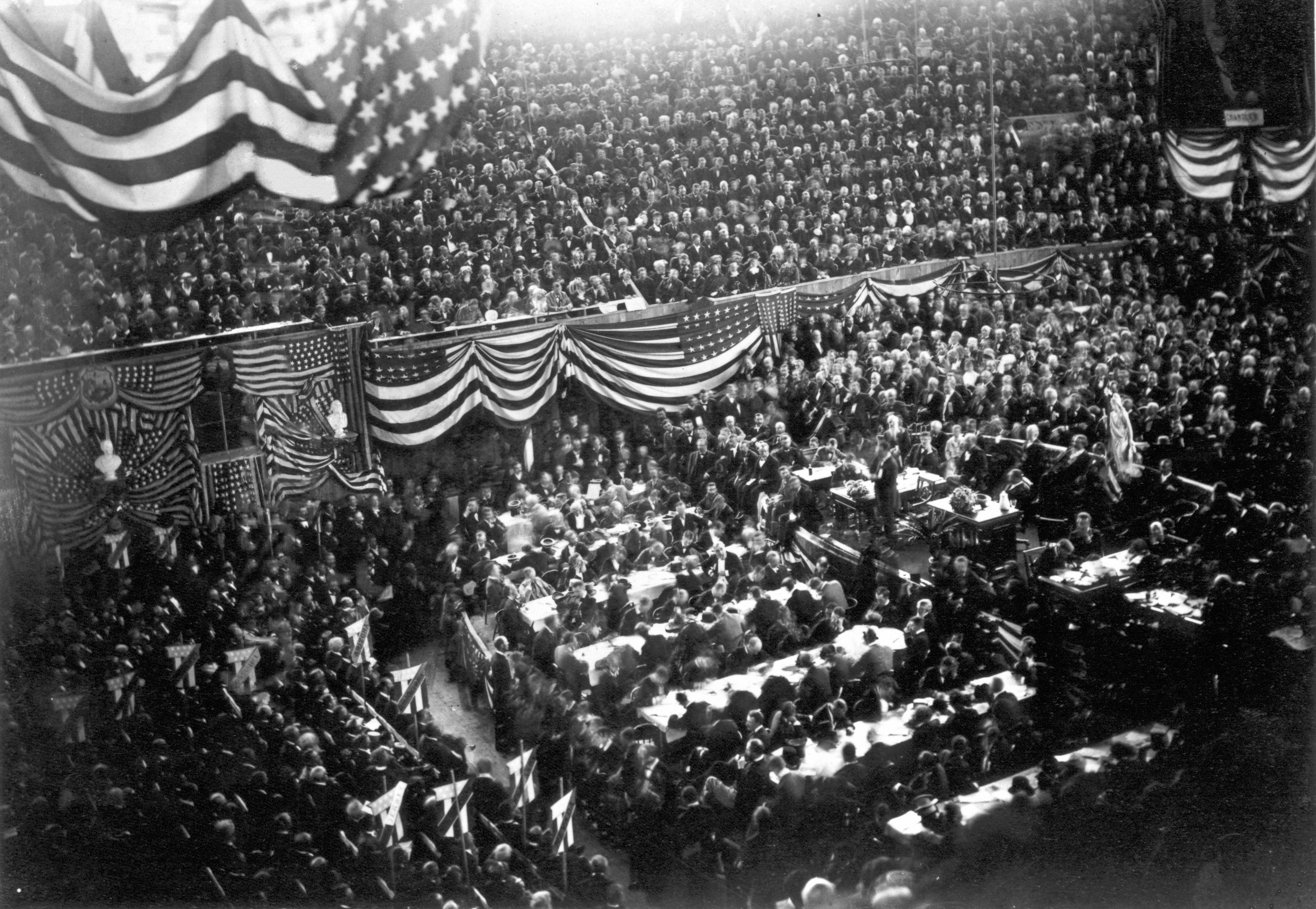
1880 Republican Convention. James A. Garfield (center, right) won the presidential nomination.

Washburne left France at the end of Grant's term in 1877, and returned to Galena. When Grant decided to run for an unprecedented third term in 1880, Washburne agreed to support him, and disavowed attempts by his own supporters to make Washburne a candidate. Despite Washburne's disavowals, he was a contender at the 1880 Republican National Convention in Chicago. With 379 votes required to win the nomination, he consistently received support from 30 to 40 delegates; Grant had been the early front runner, and consistently received between 300 and 315 votes. Recognizing after more than 30 ballots that neither Grant nor the other leading contenders, James G. Blaine and John Sherman could be nominated, delegates began to search for a dark horse. Having failed to build momentum for Washburne on an earlier ballot, on the 34th ballot 16 Washburne delegates from Wisconsin cast their votes for James A. Garfield without warning. This surprise action started a groundswell of support for Garfield, and he was nominated on the 36th ballot.

Most of Grant's delegates held firm even as most of those supporting Blaine and Sherman shifted to Garfield. Grant was angry at Washburne, believing that Washburne had not strongly supported Grant's candidacy, as Washburne had pledged to do. Grant was convinced that if Washburne's delegates switched to him, it might have generated momentum sufficient for him to win the nomination. For Washburne's part, he believed that if Grant had withdrawn, as Blaine and Sherman had, Washburne and not Garfield might have been the dark horse who obtained the nomination. Grant and Washburne never met each other again and their friendship ended.

== Retirement ==
In 1882, Washburne published a biography of former Illinois governor Edward Coles, an anti-slavery Virginian who had emancipated his slaves. Washburne later moved to Chicago, and he served as president of the Chicago Historical Society from 1884 to 1887. In 1887, he published a memoir of his time as a diplomat, Recollections of a Minister to France.

== Death and burial ==
Washburne died at his son Hempstead's home in Chicago on October 22, 1887, following a two-week period of ill health and a heart ailment. His wife had died only a few months earlier. He was buried at Greenwood Cemetery in Galena.

== Physical description and character ==
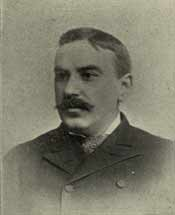
Washburne's son Hempstead; elected Mayor of Chicago in 1891

Washburne was a tall, broad shouldered man, having light gray eyes. Washburne was respected as a person of honesty and seriousness. When he moved west to Galena, Washburne vowed he would not drink, smoke, play cards, or attend the theater. After his marriage to Adele Gratiot in 1845, he adopted the practice of drinking a single glass of wine with dinner.

== Notable relatives ==
Three of Washburne's brothers (Cadwallader C. Washburn, William D. Washburn, and Israel Washburn, Jr.) also became politicians. His son, Hempstead Washburne, was the 32nd Mayor of Chicago serving from 1891 to 1893.

== Honors ==
In 1885 Washburne received the honorary degree of LL.D. from Bowdoin College.

Washburne Avenue at 1232 South in Chicago is named in honor of Elihu Washburne.

A Liberty ship launched in 1943 was named after Washburne.

== See also ==
- List of United States secretaries of state
- Elihu Benjamin Washburne House

== Sources ==
External videos
- Q&A interview with Michael Hill on Elihu Washburne: The Diary and Letters of America's Minister to France During The Siege and Commune of Paris, December 2, 2012, C-SPAN

Books

- Bunting III, Josiah (2004). Ulysses S. Grant. Henry Holt & Co. ISBN 0-8050-6949-6.
- Catton, Bruce (1969). Grant Takes Command. Boston: Little, Brown, and Company.
- Ellis, L. Ethan (1936). Dumas Malone (ed.). Dictionary of American Biography Washburne, Elihu Benjamin. New York: Charles Scribner's & Sons.
- Flood, Charles Bracelen (2005). Grant and Sherman: The Friendship That Won the Civil War. New York: Harper Perennial. ISBN 0-06-114871-7.
- Hill, Michael (2012). Elihu Washburne: The Diary and Letters of America's Minister to France During the Siege and Commune of Paris. New York: Simon & Schuster Paperbacks. ISBN 978-1-4516-6528-4.
- Industrial Chicago: The Commercial Interests. Chicago: The Goodspeed Publishing Company. 1894.
- Oates, Stephen B. (1974). "Abraham Lincoln 1861–1865". In Woodward, C. Vann (ed.). Responses of the Presidents to the Charges of Misconduct. Dell Publishing Co., Inc. pp. 111–123. ISBN 0-440-05923-2.
- Rossiter Johnson, ed. (1906). Biographical Dictionary of America Washburne, Elihu Benjamin. Boston, American Biographical Society. pp. 341–342.
- Smith, Jean Edward (2001). Grant. New York: Simon & Schuster. ISBN 0-684-84927-5.
- Winkle, Kenneth J. (2013). Lincoln's Citadel: The Civil War in Washington, DC. New York: W.W. Norton & Company. ISBN 978-0-393-08155-8.
- White, Ronald C. (2016). American Ulysses: A Life of Ulysses S. Grant. Random House Publishing Group. ISBN 978-1-5883-6992-5.

New York Times

- "Elihu B. Washburne Dead" (PDF). New York Times. New York. October 22, 1887.

U.S. House of Representatives
Preceded by William Bissell	Member of the U.S. House of Representatives from Illinois's 1st congressional district 1853–1863	Succeeded by Isaac N. Arnold
Preceded by Thomas J. D. Fuller	Chair of the House Commerce Committee; 1855–1857	Succeeded by John Cochrane
Preceded by John Cochrane	Chair of the House Commerce Committee; 1859–1868	Succeeded by Thomas D. Eliot
Preceded by Owen Lovejoy	Member of the U.S. House of Representatives from Illinois's 3rd congressional district 1863–1869	Succeeded by Horatio C. Burchard
Preceded by Thaddeus Stevens	Chair of the House Appropriations Committee; 1868–1869	Succeeded by Henry L. Dawes
Honorary titles
Preceded by John S. Phelps	Dean of the United States House of Representatives; 1863–1869	Succeeded by Henry L. Dawes
Political offices
Preceded by William H. Seward	United States Secretary of State; 1869	Succeeded by Hamilton Fish
Diplomatic posts
Preceded by John Dix	United States Minister to France; 1869–1877	Succeeded by Edward F. Noyes
