= William D. Washburn =

American politician (1831–1912)

William Drew Washburn
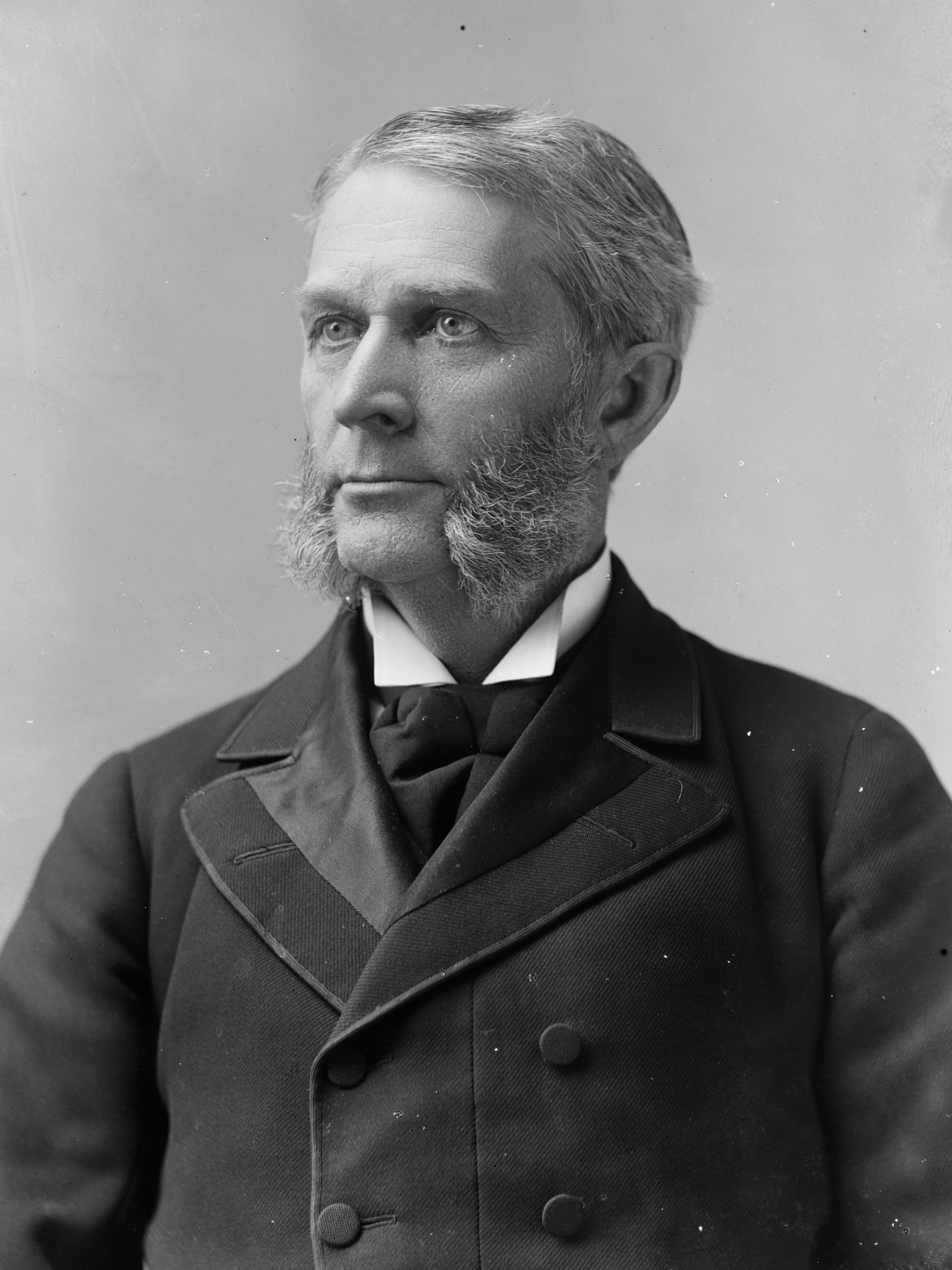
- Washburn c. 1891–1894

United States Senator from Minnesota
- In office March 4, 1889 – March 3, 1895
- Preceded by: Dwight M. Sabin
- Succeeded by: Knute Nelson

Member of the U.S. House of Representatives from Minnesota
- In office March 4, 1879 – March 3, 1885
- Preceded by: Jacob H. Stewart
- Succeeded by: John Gilfillan
- Constituency: 3rd district (1879–1883); 4th district (1883–1885)

Member of the Minnesota House of Representatives from the 5th district
- In office January 3, 1871 – January 1, 1872
- Preceded by: Albert R. Hall
- Succeeded by: E.D. Rogers

Personal details
- Born: January 14, 1831 Livermore, Maine, U.S.
- Died: July 29, 1912 (aged 81) Minneapolis, Minnesota, U.S.
- Resting place: Lakewood Cemetery
- Party: Republican
- Spouse: Lizzie Muzzie
- Children: Cadwallader and William Jr.
- Relatives: Elihu B. Washburne (brother); Cadwallader C. Washburn (brother); Israel Washburn Jr. (brother); Dorilus Morrison (cousin); C. Langhorne Washburn (grandson)
- Education: Bowdoin College

William Drew Washburn Sr. (January 14, 1831 – July 29, 1912) was an American businessman and politician. He served in both the United States House of Representatives and the United States Senate as a Republican from Minnesota. Three of his seven brothers became politicians: Elihu B. Washburne, Cadwallader C. Washburn, and Israel Washburn, Jr. He was also cousin of Dorilus Morrison, the first mayor of Minneapolis. He served in the 46th, 47th, 48th, 51st, 52nd, and 53rd congresses.

== Biography ==
Washburn was born on January 14, 1831, in Livermore, Maine. A graduate of Bowdoin College, he first studied law in the office of John A. Peters in Bangor, Maine, before moving to Minneapolis, Minnesota, around 1857. There he practiced law, and worked for the Minneapolis Milling Company (founded by his brother Cadwallader). His business ventures in lumber and flour milling allowed him to amass a large fortune, and by the 1880s, he was among the wealthiest men in Minnesota. Washburn served as the first president from 1883 to 1889 of what was to become Soo Line Railroad. He also founded the Pillsbury-Washburn Milling Company, which later became the Pillsbury Company, and was eventually absorbed by his brother's firm, General Mills.

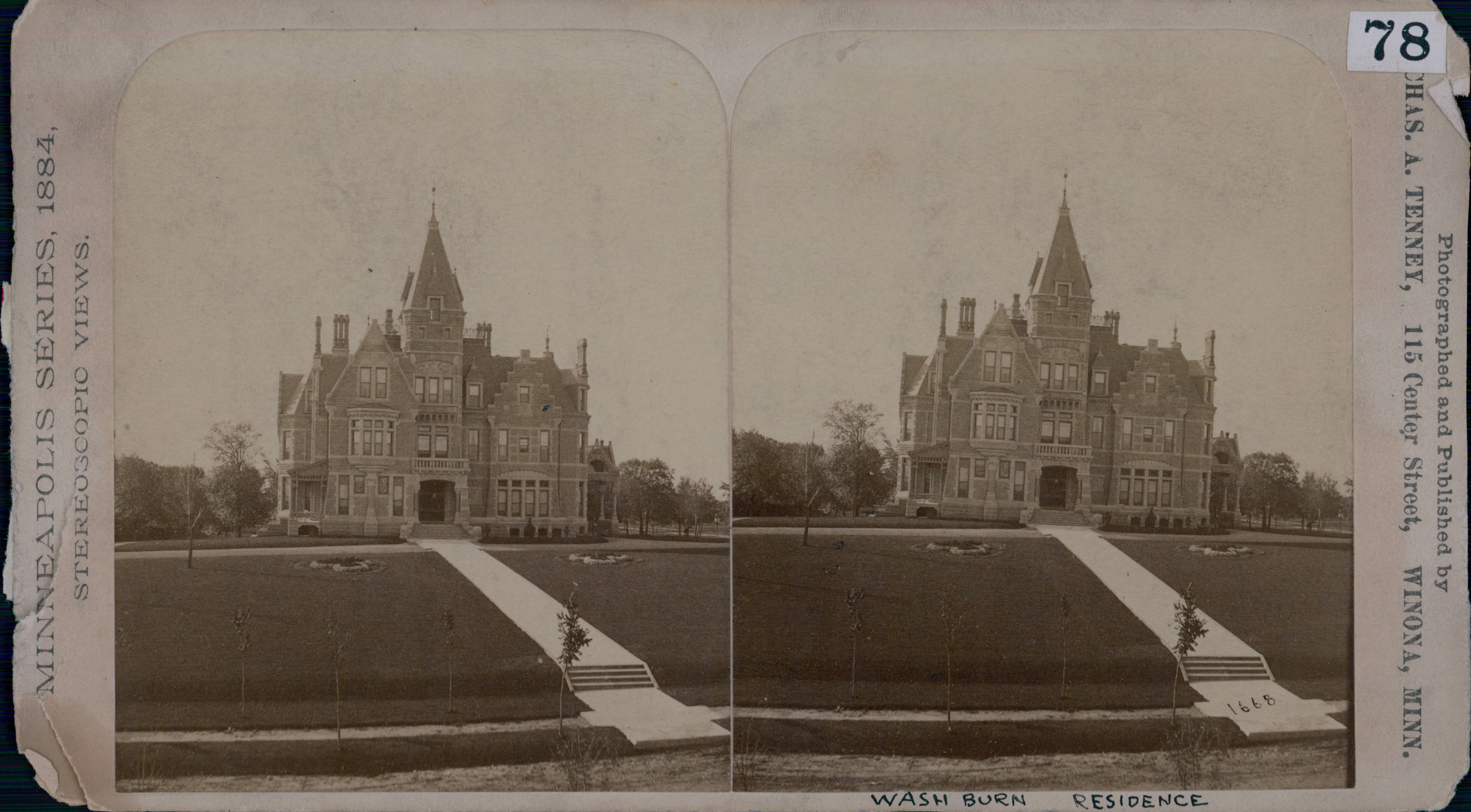
Fair Oaks mansion

Washburn built a mansion known as "Fair Oaks" in 1883. It was designed by E. Townsend Mix, who also designed Minneapolis's Metropolitan Building, and the outdoor landscape was laid out by Frederick Law Olmsted. The grounds included an artificial stream leading to a pond, a rustic footbridge, a greenhouse, and a carriage house. The home was demolished in 1924 to make way for a park, although the region is now part of the Washburn-Fair Oaks Mansion District, which was added to the National Register of Historic Places in 1977.

=== Political career ===
Washburn served in the Minnesota House of Representatives in 1871. In 1873, he ran for the Republican nomination for Governor of Minnesota. Despite leading initially, he would be defeated with three votes in the primary by Cushman Kellogg Davis. He was elected to the United States House of Representatives in 1878 and served from March 4, 1879, to March 3, 1885. He was elected to the Senate in 1888 and served from March 4, 1889, to March 3, 1895.

=== Personal life ===
Washburn was a founder of the First Universalist Church of Minneapolis in 1859. A major benefactor, he served as a trustee and President for much of his remaining life. He died in Minneapolis on July 29, 1912. He was buried in Lakewood Cemetery. His grandson C. Langhorne Washburn was to be active in the Republican Party from the 1950s through the 1970s.

William Washburn's son, Cadwallader Lincoln Washburn, was born in 1866. Cad became deaf as a child. His talent as an artist was noticed at an early age. Cad eventually became a noted artist and news correspondent who pioneered many new painting techniques in the west. The arts center at his alma mater, Gallaudet University, is named for Cad Washburn. Another son William Drew Washburn Jr. also served in the Minnesota House of Representatives.

== Legacy ==
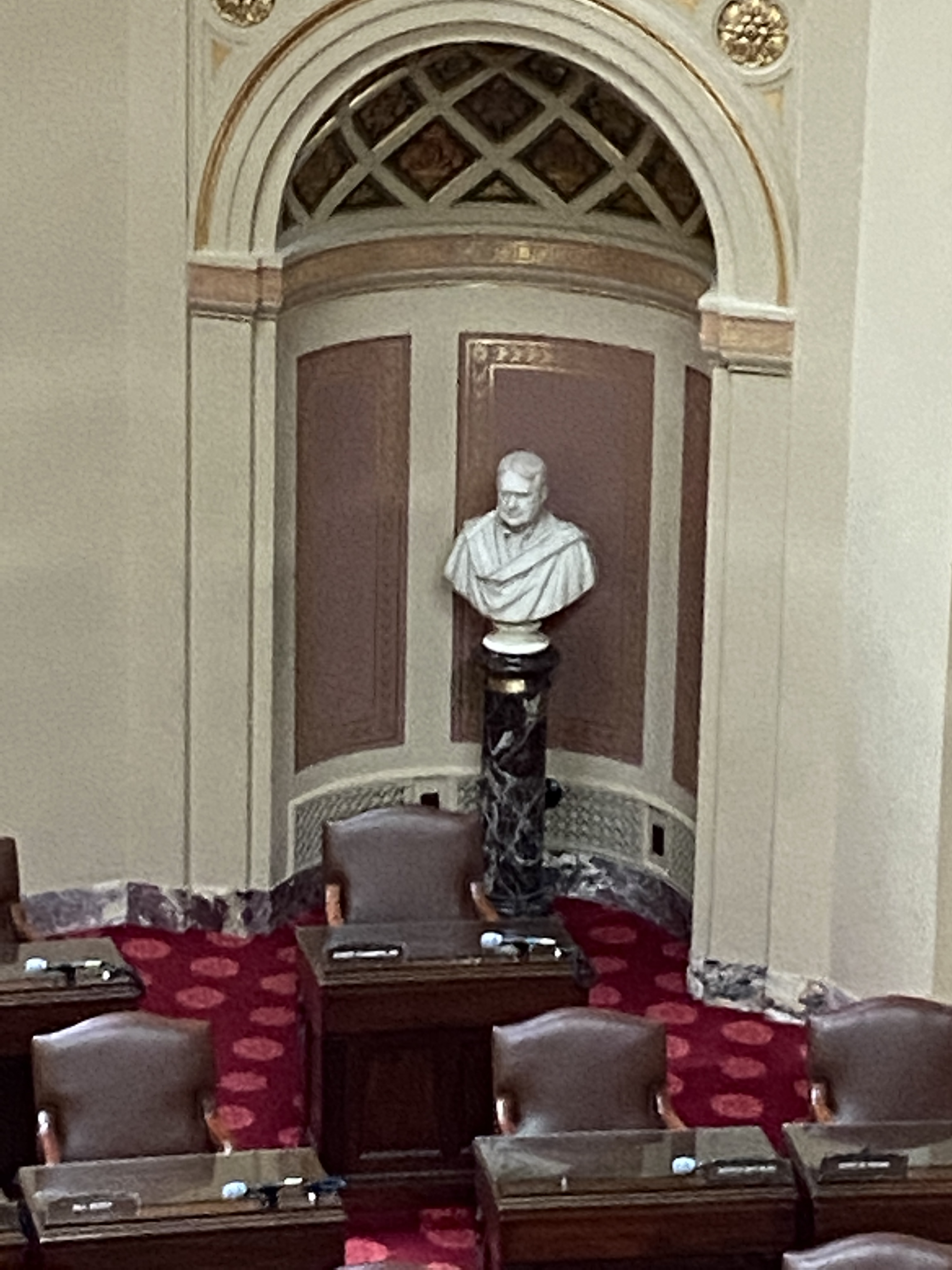
Bust of William Washburn, Minnesota Senate Chamber

A bust of Washburn is located in the chamber of the Minnesota Senate in 1906, sculpted by Franklin Simmons.

Washburn Elementary School in Bloomington, Minnesota, was named after him. The school become a preschool, renamed 'Early Learning at Washburn', in 2025.

U.S. Senate
Preceded by Dwight M. Sabin	U.S. senator (Class 2) from Minnesota; 1889–1895; Served alongside: Cushman Davis	Succeeded by Knute Nelson
U.S. House of Representatives
Preceded by Jacob H. Stewart	U.S. Representative from Minnesota's 3rd congressional district 1879–1883	Succeeded by Horace B. Strait
Preceded by —	U.S. Representative from Minnesota's 4th congressional district 1883–1885	Succeeded by John Gilfillan
Business positions
New title	President of Soo Line Railroad; 1883–1889	Succeeded by Thomas Lowry
