= Israel Washburn Jr. =

American politician (1813–1883)

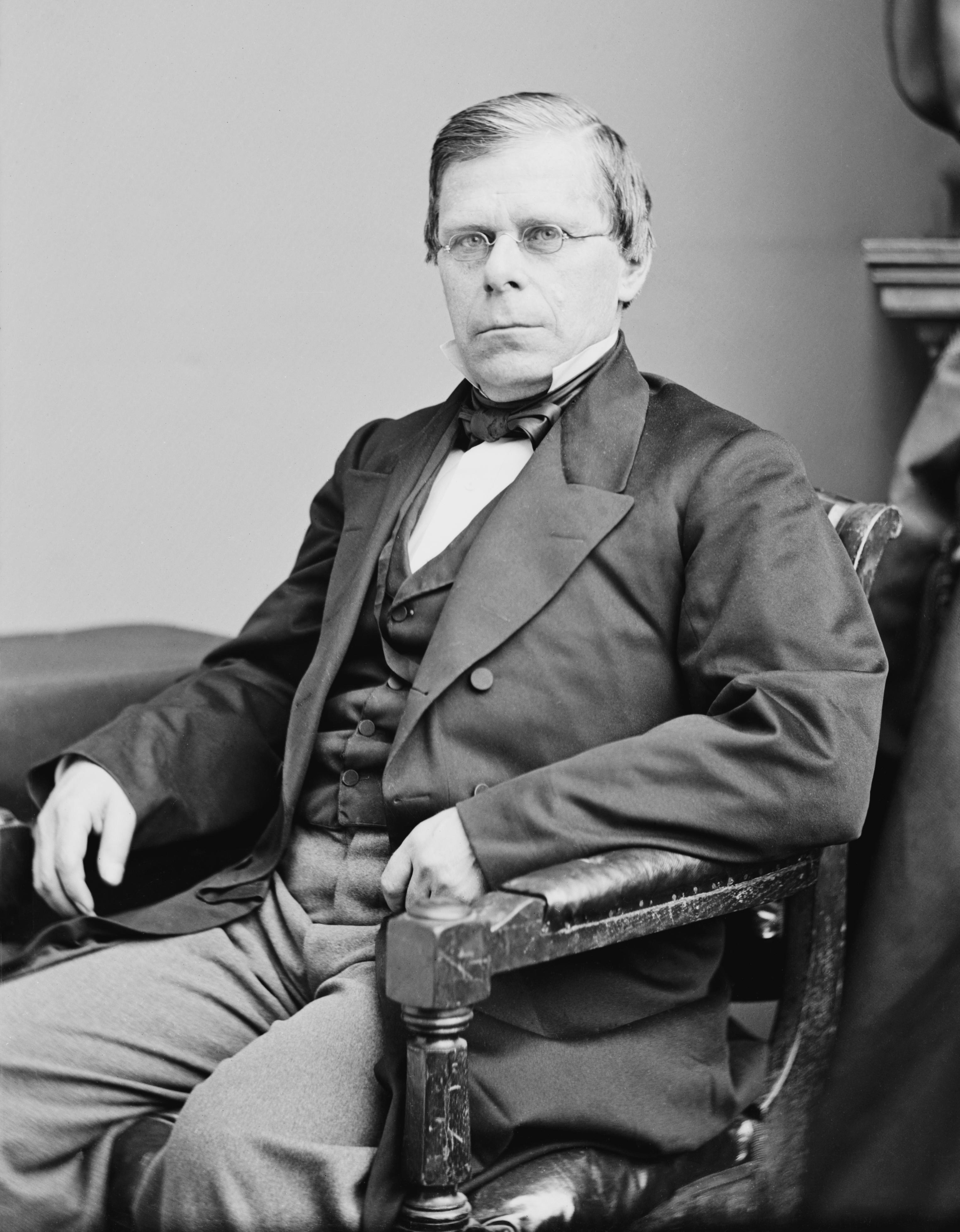
- Washburn, 1855–1865

29th Governor of Maine
- In office January 2, 1861 – January 7, 1863
- Preceded by: Lot M. Morrill
- Succeeded by: Abner Coburn

Member of the U.S. House of Representatives from Maine
- In office March 4, 1851 – January 1, 1861
- Preceded by: Charles Stetson (6th); Ephraim K. Smart (5th)
- Succeeded by: Thomas J. D. Fuller (6th); Stephen Coburn (5th)
- Constituency: 6th district (1851-53); 5th district (1853-61)

Personal details
- Born: June 6, 1813 Livermore, Massachusetts, U.S. (now Maine)
- Died: May 12, 1883 (aged 69) Philadelphia, Pennsylvania, U.S.
- Party: Whig; Republican

Israel Washburn Jr. (June 6, 1813 – May 12, 1883) was a United States political figure who was the 29th governor of Maine from 1861 to 1863. Originally a member of the Whig Party, he later became a founding member of the Republican Party. In 1842, Washburn served in the Maine House of Representatives.

In 1854, angry over the passage of the Kansas-Nebraska Act, Washburn called a meeting of 30 members of the US House of Representatives to discuss forming what became the Republican Party. Republican gatherings had taken place in Wisconsin and Michigan earlier in the year, but Washburn's meeting was the first in the U.S. Capital, and among U.S. Congressmen. He was probably also the first politician of his rank to use the term "Republican", in a speech at Bangor, Maine on June 2, 1854. Washburn represented the district which included Bangor and the neighboring town of Orono, Maine, where he had his home and law office.

== Biography ==
Born in 1813 in Livermore (in modern-day Maine, then a part of Massachusetts) to a prominent political family, Washburn spent his life in politics. He was an unsuccessful candidate for the Thirty-first Congress in 1848; elected as a Whig to the Thirty-second and Thirty-third Congresses, as a Republican to the Thirty-fourth, Thirty-fifth, and Thirty-sixth Congresses. He served from March 4, 1851, to January 1, 1861, when he resigned, having been elected Governor.

He was Chairman of the Committee on Elections (Thirty-fourth Congress). He organized the Maine Republican Party from 1854 onward. He was the 29th governor of Maine from 1861 to 1863. During the American Civil War, he helped recruit Federal troops from Maine. In 1862, he attended the Loyal War Governors' Conference in Altoona, Pennsylvania, which ultimately gave Abraham Lincoln support for his Emancipation Proclamation.

In 1863, Lincoln appointed Washburn Collector of the Port of Portland, a position he held until 1877. Washburn was elected a member of the American Antiquarian Society in 1882.

Washburn was the brother of Elihu B. Washburne, Cadwallader C. Washburn, William D. Washburn, Samuel Benjamin Washburn, and Charles Ames Washburn. He died in 1883 in Philadelphia and is buried at the Mount Hope Cemetery in Bangor, Maine.

The town of Washburn, Maine is named in his honor.

== Notes ==
Party political offices
Preceded by Lot M. Morrill	Republican nominee for Governor of Maine; 1860, 1861	Succeeded by Abner Coburn
U.S. House of Representatives
Preceded by Charles Stetson	Member of the U.S. House of Representatives from Maine's 6th congressional district March 4, 1851 – March 3, 1853	Succeeded by Thomas J. D. Fuller
Preceded by Ephraim K. Smart	Member of the U.S. House of Representatives from Maine's 5th congressional district March 4, 1853 – January 1, 1861	Succeeded by Stephen Coburn
Political offices
Preceded by Lot M. Morrill	Governor of Maine; 1861–1863	Succeeded by Abner Coburn
