= Al Harrington (disambiguation) =

Al Harrington (born 1980) is an American former basketball player and coach.

Al or Albert Harrington may also refer to:

- Al Harrington (actor) (1935–2021), American television actor
- Al Harrington (Family Guy), fictional character from the American animated TV series Family Guy
- Albert Harrington (merchant) (1850–1914), Minnesota grain merchant

== See also ==
- Alan Harrington (1933–2019), Welsh footballer
