= Alfred L. Bergerud =

American lawyer and politician

Alfred L. Bergerud (February 2, 1899 – February 15, 1977) was an American lawyer and politician.

Bergerud was born on a farm in Aastad Township, Otter Tail County, Minnesota near Fergus Falls, Minnesota. He went to the elementary and secondary schools. Bergerud graduated from St. Olaf College and University of Minnesota Law School. He lived in Minneapolis, Minnesota, with his wife and family and practiced law in Minneapolis. Bergerud served in the Minnesota House of Representatives in 1941 and 1942 and from 1945 to 1958. He then served in the Minnesota Senate from 1959 to 1972. Bergerud served as vice-president and president of the Red Owl Stores, Inc. He died at the Abbott-Northwestern Hospital in Minneapolis Minnesota. He funeral and burial was in Lakewood Cemetery in Minneapolis.
