= Mary Ann Feldman =

American music critic (1933–2019)

- Born: Mary Ann Janisch; April 20, 1933; Saint Paul, Minnesota, U.S.
- Died: February 18, 2019 (aged 85); Minneapolis, Minnesota, U.S.
- Resting place: Lakewood Cemetery, Minneapolis, Minnesota, U.S.
- Education: University of Minnesota (BA, PhD); Columbia University (MA)
- Occupation: Music critic
- Spouse: Harold

Mary Ann Feldman (née Janisch; April 20, 1933 – February 18, 2019) was an American music critic.

== Biography ==
Born Mary Ann Janisch in St. Paul, Minnesota, Feldman grew up in the Frogtown neighborhood of the city. Her parents were the proprietors of a small restaurant there. She was educated at the University of Minnesota, where she studied journalism and music history and received a BA in 1954. While there she wrote music reviews for the Minnesota Daily under the pseudonym "V. I. Olin". In 1957 she completed her MA in musicology at Columbia University, which she had chosen for the opportunity to study with Paul Henry Lang. In 1983 she received a Ph.D. from the University of Minnesota, where she took as the subject of her dissertation George Putnam Upton; she had previously taught at the university for a number of years. In 1963 she began to work for the Minnesota Orchestra, where she would spend four decades working in the fields of music advising and public affairs. Among her many roles there, she edited the monthly program books; gave pre-concert lectures; aided in the establishments of the yearly Sommerfest; and assisted in documenting the organization's history. Her program notes were especially well-regarded, being described by one writer as "erudite and witty".

From 1977 until 1981 Feldman was a member of the board of directors of the Music Critics Association; until 1986 she was the vice-president of the Metropolitan Opera for the Upper Midwest. Beginning in 1996 she worked for the Grand Teton Music Festival as a writer and speaker. Her interests during her career included such diverse topics as theories of music criticism; the history of music critics active in the Western United States; and the musical history of Minnesota. Her writing appeared in such outlets as Musical America, Opera News, the Minneapolis Star, and the New Grove Dictionary of Music and Musicians, as well as publications of the Schubert Club International Artists Series. Feldman received the An die Musik Award from Schubert Club in 2001.

Feldman died in Minneapolis of complications from Alzheimer's disease, from which she had suffered for more than a decade. Her husband, Harold, a computer technician, died of dementia in 2016. She is buried in Lakewood Cemetery.
