= Ida Dorsey =

American madam

- Born: Ida Mary Callahan c. March 7, 1866; Woodford County, Kentucky, US
- Died: June 18, 1918 (aged 52); Minneapolis, Minnesota, US
- Resting place: Lakewood Cemetery, Minneapolis
- Other names: Ida Dorsey, Ida Burkes, Ida Pillsbury
- Occupation: Brothel owner
- Years active: 1885 to c.1918
- Known for: built and owned last standing brothel in Minneapolis

Ida Mary Dorsey (née Callahan; c. March 7, 1866 – June 18, 1918), also known as Ida Burkes and Ida Pillsbury, was an American madam who operated five successive houses of prostitution in Minneapolis, Minnesota. Dorsey's life came into focus when Penny Petersen published Minneapolis Madams: The Lost History of Prostitution on the Riverfront in 2013.

Part African-American, Dorsey catered only to whites and was among the city's most prominent and successful madams. The brothel she built at 212 Eleventh Avenue South is the only one still standing from Minneapolis' three red-light districts (c. 1870s – 1910). Dorsey is also remembered for her long-term friendship with Carleton Pillsbury, scion of the Pillsbury family.

== Early life and family ==
In 1866, Ida Callahan was born to Mary (or Maria) Turner, most likely an African-American woman, and John Callahan, likely a white man, in Woodford County, Kentucky. Kentucky outlawed interracial marriage, so her parents never married. Roberta, her younger sister and only full sibling, later known as "Birdie Berts," would join Dorsey's business. Later, her mother left for Fayette County. Mary married George Burkes (also spelled Burke or Burk) and had several sons. Nebraska Burkes, one of her sons, would play ragtime piano in Dorsey's establishment. Ida Burkes once claimed to have operated a bordello from the age of 16.

== First brothels ==
Ida Burkes moved from Kentucky to Minnesota and, by 1885, lived with John Hershfield in St. Paul. After adopting the name Dorsey, in 1886 Dorsey ran a bordello at 5th Street & Jackson Street, reported to be "a very tough place" catering to African-American soldiers.

Perhaps attracted by the city's wealth, Dorsey moved to Minneapolis in 1886, where she employed seven or eight women of color. Appearing to be an old ramshackle exterior at 125 Second Street North, inside the house held beautiful carpets, fancy wallpaper, and elegant furniture. Serving only white customers, the women danced the can-can, which the Minneapolis police chief had outlawed, and performed shadow dances in silhouette.

African-American leaders once circulated a petition asking to close her down. Other criticism came from African-American men who objected to her whites-only policy.

In 1886, when she was twenty-two, Dorsey was convicted as "Mary Coon" of selling liquor without a license and running a house of prostitution. Dorsey felt she had cooperated and had contributed towards a liquor license. Other madams were only fined, but Dorsey served 76 days of a 90-day sentence in the Minnesota State Prison in Stillwater, with time off for good behavior.

== Move across Hennepin ==
Upon her return from prison in late 1886, Dorsey leased 119 Second Street North from madam Carrie Moore. She and several other established madams were fined $200 to $350, but they all escaped imprisonment.

Dorsey moved her business to what had become the city's premier red-light district, opening in 1887, on the site formerly used by Etta Forrest, at 116 Second Avenue South. Her sister Roberta had joined her by this time and is recorded as having paid the monthly fine of $80.

== Eleventh Avenue ==
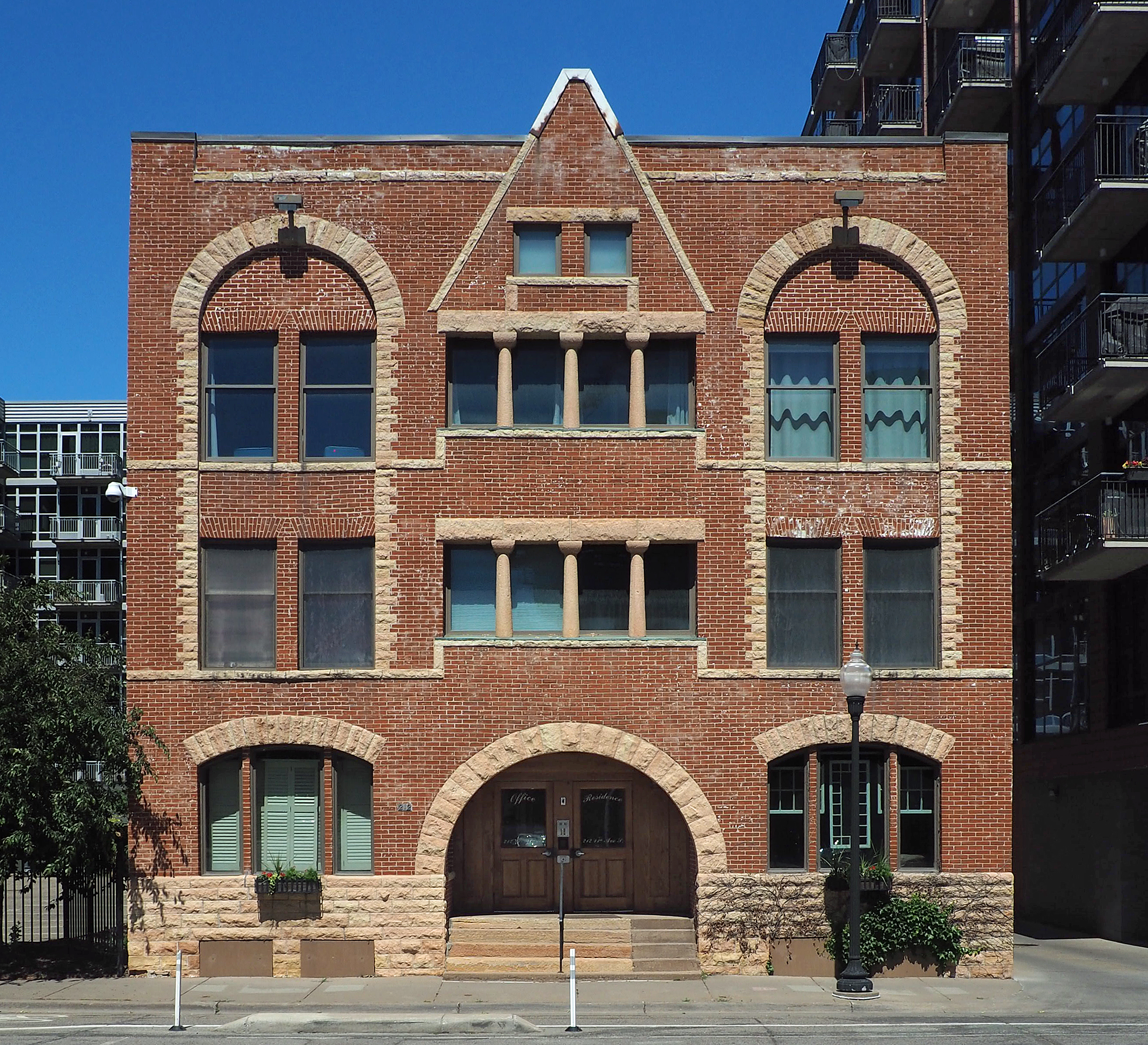
Dorsey's sporting house on Eleventh Avenue, which Petersen describes as Richardsonian Romanesque and Larry Millett describes as Romanesque Revival.

A community largely of immigrants who lacked political clout was unable to resist the building of a new red-light district in its midst. In November 1890, Dorsey began her move to Eleventh Avenue, following the lead of madams Mabel Baker, aka Mary Allen, and her sister Frances Stewart, aka Frances Myers, who were the area's main property owners.

Much like other brothels in the city, the land at 212 Eleventh Avenue South transferred hands in deals meant to conceal its ownership. First, Andrew Haugan who had served on the city council and his wife Louise sold the property to Carolina Anderson, who took out a building permit with the city for a three-story, $12,000 apartment structure. Anderson's husband, Zacharias, became the general contractor. Another party, John L. Anderson, owned the building in trust for Carolina Anderson and Ida Dorsey. A former alderman and park commissioner supplied the lumber. Dorsey spent a further $15,000 to decorate the interior. She sent out announcements of its opening to everyone, even to pastors who were mainly interested in seeing her closed down. Dorsey had been in Minneapolis for only five years, but already she was her own landlord. The deal closed in 1906 when Dorsey gained the title, using the name Callahan.

She continued to entertain whites exclusively, attracting a formidable lineup of clients. A St. Paul paper said she refused entry even to Harris Martin, a storied African-American boxer known as "The Black Pearl". Petersen cites a Twin Cities Reporter account that said Dorsey would never be raided because "some pretty big guns would be grabbed there, and the papers would have some great stories."

== Friends and family ==
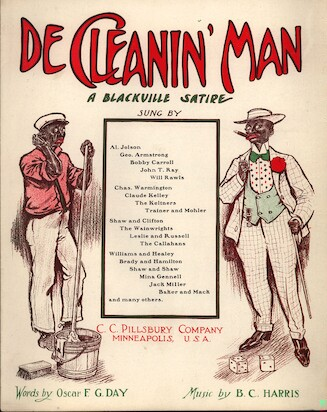
De Cleanin' Man, sung by Al Jolson and others, published by C. C. Pillsbury Co. in 1906

In 1891, Dorsey had a stillborn child, who is buried in the family plot.

In 1898, Bertie died of cancer. Dorsey took charge of Bertie's daughter Alvah Hunton and left most of her estate to Hunton when she died.

In the 1890s, Dorsey invited her mother and half-brothers from Kentucky. In 1904, she bought a home for them in south Minneapolis.

During the early 1900s, Dorsey became friends with Carleton Pillsbury, who loved music and acting, and who, in his short life, became a music publisher. After Carleton died, Dorsey sometimes used the name Mrs. Ida Pillsbury. The son of Frederick and Alice Pillsbury, Carleton was the nephew of flour miller Charles Alfred Pillsbury, grandson of mayor George A. Pillsbury, and great-nephew of governor John S. Pillsbury. Petersen in 2013 told the Twin Cities Daily Planet that Pillsbury may have had a fascination with stereotypical African-American culture: "he performed in black face and published stereotypical sheet music." (Example at right.)

== Back to St. Paul ==
Through various means, Minneapolis decided to oust its madams. A citizens' purity crusade, reformers' hysterical belief in white slavery, discrimination against about 86 Chinese immigrants, the Ames trials of a former mayor, grand architectural city remakes, the temperance movement, and anti-corruption activists were behind a raid and arrest of 19 madams including Dorsey in April 1910. Caught up in a vice raid in 1911, Dorsey decided that public opinion was against her in Minneapolis. In 1913, she opened a brothel at 151 South Washington Street in St. Paul, a site owned by madam Nina Clifford. Dorsey paid $1000 to Clifford for the house and $3000 to various city officials, who ultimately were convicted of graft and jailed. She was open for only a few months and is quoted as feeling "like a dummy" for having made the move.

She was now over forty years old and not wealthy enough to retire. In 1907, Dorsey had diversified her investments when she bought an apartment building with a grocery store on the main floor at 1214–1220 First Avenue South, now Marquette Avenue. She owned brothels in Duluth and in Superior, Wisconsin. She was persecuted, beginning in 1914, by the publisher of the Twin Cities Reporter who called her vile names and enjoyed hounding her on his front page. (Petersen calls the man obsessed.) The Marquette Avenue property was used as a brothel and as Dorsey's home when she became ill.

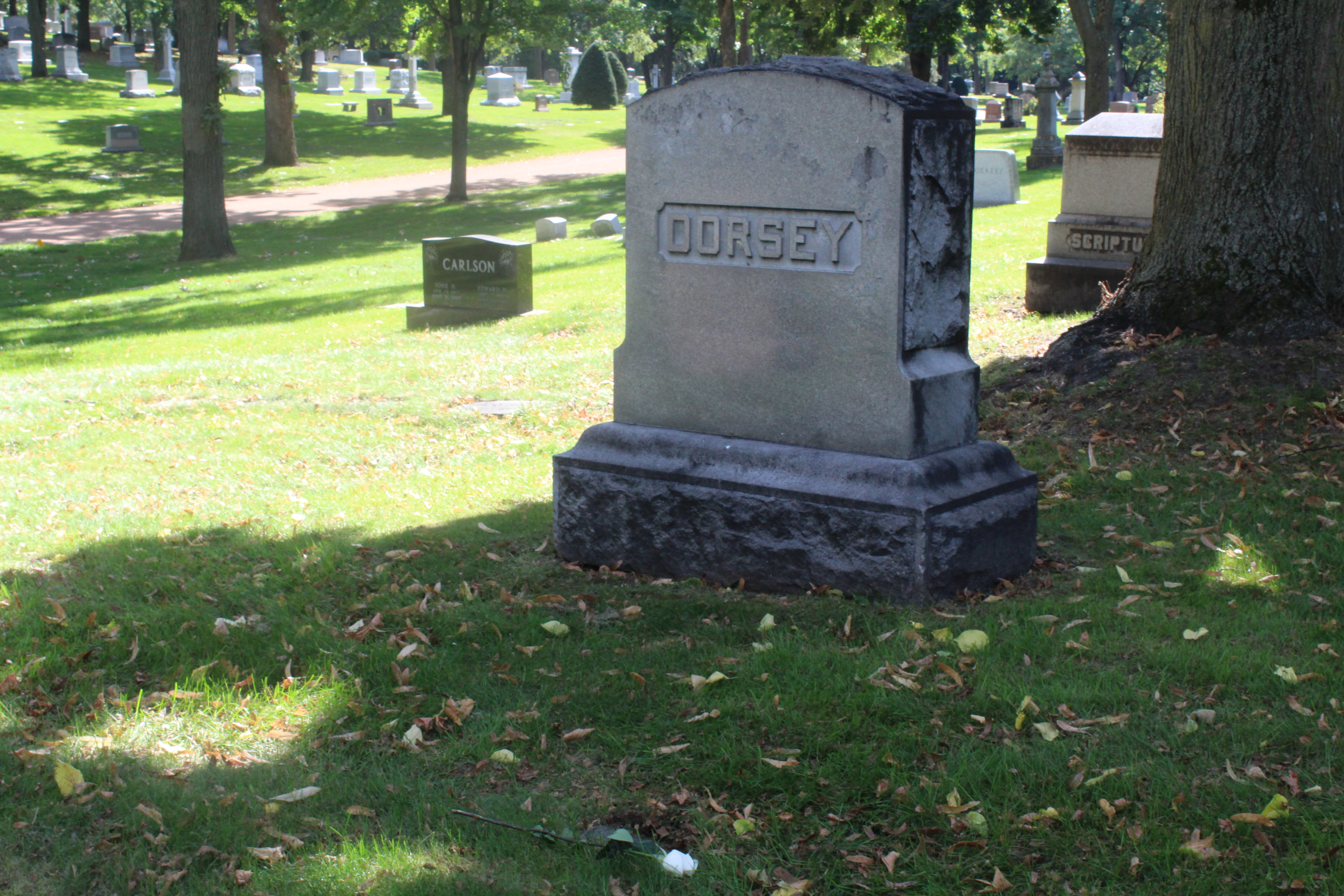
Dorsey monument at Lakewood Cemetery

== Death ==
Dorsey developed cancer and was a patient at Eitel Hospital. She died at age 52 on June 18, 1918, and is buried with the child she lost, her mother Maria Burkes, possibly her stepfather George Burkes, her sister Roberta, and half-brothers Moses, George, Henry, and Nebraska, in Lakewood Cemetery in Minneapolis.

== Bibliography ==
- Petersen, Penny A. (2013). Minneapolis Madams: The Lost History of Prostitution on the Riverfront. University of Minnesota Press. ISBN 978-0816688609.
