= William Frederick Brooks =

American businessman and politician

William Frederick Brooks (March 1, 1863 – March 19, 1928) was an American businessman and politician.

Brooks was born in Battle Creek, Michigan and he moved to Minneapolis, Minnesota, with his family, in 1875. Brooks graduated from Central High School in Minneapolis. Brooks received his bachelor's degree in mechanical engineering from Worcester Institute of Technology, Worcester, Massachusetts (new Worcester Polytechnic Institute in 1884. Brooks was involved with the lumber and paper businesses in Minneapolis. Brooks served in the Minnesota Senate from 1919 until his death in 1928 and was a Republican. He was buried in Lakewood Cemetery.
