= Robert S. Brown =

American physician (1863–1927)

- Born: Robert Sirelle Brown; December 8, 1863; Staunton, Virginia, U.S.
- Died: April 4, 1927 (aged 63)
- Resting place: Lakewood Cemetery
- Education: Bennett Medical College
- Occupation: Physician
- Spouse(s): Julia Perrin Anna Webb (m. 1892)
- Children: 4

Robert Sirelle Brown (December 8, 1863 – April 4, 1927) was the first black physician in Minneapolis.

== Biography ==
Robert Sirelle Brown was born on December 8, 1863, in Staunton, Virginia. He graduated from Bennett Medical College in Chicago with honors in 1895. He practiced medicine in Oskaloosa, Iowa, where he married Julia Perrin. The couple had four children together. In 1892, Brown married again to Anna Webb in Lincoln, Nebraska.

Brown moved to Minneapolis around 1898. At the time, Minneapolis and St. Paul had a small but active black community, and the newspaper The Appeal placed ads promoting the Twin Cities in other black-owned newspapers. It is possible Brown was recruited by their campaign to bring black professionals to the area.

Brown received local support from community. The St. Peter African Methodist Episcopal Church threw him a welcome event, which was covered in The Appeal. Brown opened a medical practice downtown where he was open seven days a week. He was involved in many local organizations including the Elks, the Odd Fellows, and the Knights of Pythias. In 1921, he was elected the president of the local NAACP chapter. He was frequently recognized in The Appeal but was not mentioned in white newspapers until being honored for "Negro History Week", the precursor to Black History Month, in the Minneapolis Star in 1970.

Brown died at his home on April 4, 1927, and is buried at Lakewood Cemetery. His son and grandson were also doctors in Minneapolis.
