= Nina Clifford =

American brothel owner

- Born: Johanna Crow; August 3, 1851; Chatham, Canada West
- Died: July 14, 1929 (aged 77); Detroit, Michigan
- Resting place: Mount Elliott Cemetery, Detroit
- Occupation: Brothel owner
- Spouse: Conrad Steinbrecher

Nina Clifford (August 3, 1851 – July 14, 1929) was a Canadian-born madam who ran the most popular brothel in Saint Paul, Minnesota, from 1889 to 1929.

== Early life ==
Clifford was born Johanna Crow (also known as "Hannah") on August 3, 1851, in Chatham, Canada West to Irish or German immigrant parents. Her family moved to Detroit, Michigan, while she was a child. Later, still in Detroit, she married a man named Conrad Steinbrecher.

== Saint Paul ==
Widowed in 1886 at the age of 35, Clifford moved to St. Paul. In 1887 she brought two building lots on Washington Street along the Mississippi River, opposite the city morgue and police station, and had two red brick buildings built. Clifford lived in one, no. 145, and started a brothel in the other, no. 147. During this time she started going by the name Nina Clifford. Washington Street was then in St. Paul's red-light district, concentrated downtown between Cedar and Sibley Streets, and "under the hill" near Eagle Street. Clifford's was one of St. Paul's most upscale brothels. Its interior was appointed with plush furnishing and marble fireplaces. The waiting area featured crystal chandeliers and Mumm's champagne was served.

Business was good, and in 1895 records show that Clifford employed 11 prostitutes and three servants. A musician was also included in 1900 records. By the 1920s the brothel had two telephone lines. Clifford was known to accept diamonds in payment, and was reputed to have several hundred uncut diamonds. She brought other madams to the Washington District, including Ida Dorsey, who purchased Clifford's building at 151 South Washington Street.

Clifford frequently appeared in court, as did other madams, and was fined. The fine was effectively a licensing fee. She also regularly bribed the police. In 1913 Clifford was charged with bribery in connection with a corruption case against former police chief Martin Flanagan and detective Fred Turner, but avoided conviction by testifying for the prosecution.

Clifford invested her profits in property in Michigan. She ran the business personally until she died of a stroke on July 14, 1929, aged 78, in Detroit while visiting family. She is buried there in Mount Elliott Cemetery.

== Legacy ==
Clifford's brothel was demolished in 1937. Journalist and St. Paul mayor Larry Hodgson wrote a poem to mark the event:

"The Lay of Nina Clifford"

The windows are grimy and covered with dust
In that old house under the hill
The door hinges rusty, the lock is bust
The spider webs cover it still
No longer do gay lights their welcome convey
Inviting the wayfarer in
To choose from the bevy, his favorite lay
To dally a while and sin
Gone are the sofas and plush covered chairs
From the parlor once happy and bright
No longer do douche pans in bedrooms upstairs
Clank busily all thru the night
No more do fat durghers play and carouse
And some pretty blonds on their backs
For Nina is dead and her once famous house
Is sold to pay up the back tax
They're widening the street so they're tearing it down
The whorehouse that was once the pride of the town
Soon won't be worth more than a fart
It's stone they are taking the morgue to repair
A purpose appropriate – true
For many a stiff has been laid in them both

Even as me and you

It was rumored that underground tunnels linked Clifford's brothel to the Minnesota Club for easy access by club members, but this was disproved by a 1997 excavation of the site for the new Science Museum of Minnesota, during which no tunnels were found. A portrait of a woman believed to be Clifford hung on the wall at the club, and though it may have resembled Clifford, it was actually a reproduction of a "Miss Pearce," previously attributed to Thomas Sully. A brick from the brothel is mounted in the club with a plaque reading, "This brick from Nina Clifford's house is presented to the Gentlemen of the Minnesota Club for their great interest in historic buildings". The club renamed its billiard room after Clifford. The ornate crystal chandelier from the brothel's waiting room was hung in the mayor's office after the brothel was demolished.

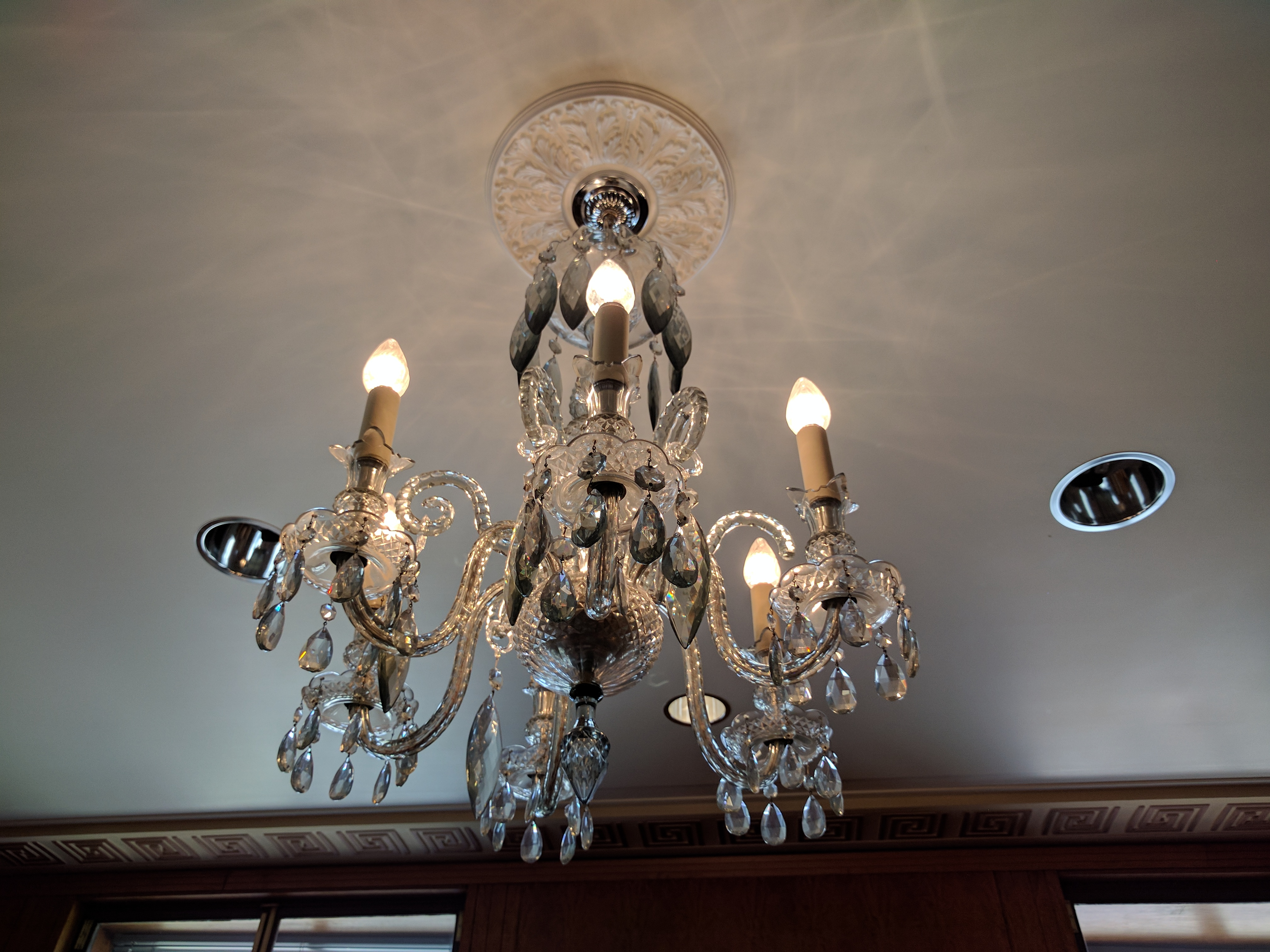
Chandelier from Nina Clifford's brothel, later moved to the St. Paul mayor's office

The brothel's foundations were discovered during excavations for the Science Museum of Minnesota in 1998. A group of archaeologists from the 106 Group unearthed many artifacts. From these they concluded that, although the prostitutes earned nine or ten times the average women's earnings at the time, conditions were unsanitary and harsh.

Clifford was memorialized in the 1980s with a play, and then a musical, titled Nina! Madam to a Saintly City.
