= Eleanor Bellows Pillsbury =

American activist (1913–1971)

- Born: January 13, 1913; Minneapolis, Minnesota, US
- Died: August 27, 1971 (aged 58); Wayzata, Minnesota, U.S.
- Resting place: Lakewood Cemetery
- Education: Smith College (bachelor's degree)
- Spouse: Philip W. Pillsbury (m. 1934)
- Children: 2

Eleanor Bellows Pillsbury (January 16, 1913 – August 27, 1971) was an American activist who was the president of Planned Parenthood from 1950 to 1953 and helped create the International Planned Parenthood Federation.

== Early life ==
Pillsbury was born in 1913 in Minneapolis, Minnesota. She graduated from the Northrop Collegiate School and then received a bachelor's degree from Smith College. Syracuse University Dean Eugenia Leonard advised "women college graduates to enter volunteer work rather than accept a salary," which Pillsbury followed.

== Career ==
From 1950 to 1953 Pillsbury served as the president of Planned Parenthood. She helped create the International Planned Parenthood Federation and traveled to India to discuss the organization with Mahatma Gandhi. Pillsbury was awarded the Lasker Award by Planned Parenthood – World Population in 1952 as under her leadership, "Planned Parenthood has reached a new era as a national force and international influence."

Only 38 years old in 1951, she was the youngest member of the initial group of women to serve on the Defense Department Advisory Committee on Women in the Services. She also served on the Minneapolis Junior League and the Minnesota Research Council (part of the National Health Council).

She was the vice president of the American Red Cross and sat on its national board as an honorary member at the time of her death.

== Personal life ==
She married Philip W. Pillsbury in 1934, and had two children. At Pillsbury baking contests, she served as a hostess, remarking that she was a "Den mother for all the contestants." Pillsbury died in 1971 from cancer at her home in Wayzata, Minnesota. She was buried in Lakewood Cemetery.

In 2000, the Women's Refugee Commission established the Eleanor Bellows Pillsbury Fund for Reproductive Health Care and Rights for Adolescent Refugees to provide grants for adolescent reproductive health projects.
