= Thomas Robinson (Medal of Honor, 1866) =

United States Navy sailor

- Born: May 17, 1837; Norway
- Died: May 12, 1915 (aged 77)
- Burial place: Lakewood Cemetery, Minneapolis, Minnesota
- Military career
- Allegiance: United States
- Branch: United States Navy
- Rank: Captain of the Afterguard
- Unit: USS Tallapoosa
- Awards: Medal of Honor

Thomas Robinson (May 17, 1837 – May 12, 1915) was a United States Navy sailor and a recipient of the United States military's highest decoration, the Medal of Honor.

A native of Norway, Robinson immigrated to the United States and joined the Navy from the state of New York. By July 15, 1866, he was serving as captain of the afterguard on the USS Tallapoosa. On that day, while the Tallapoosa was off the coast of New Orleans, Louisiana, he attempted to rescue a shipmate, Landsman Wellington Brocar, from drowning. For this action, he was awarded the Medal of Honor two weeks later, on August 1.

Robinson's official Medal of Honor citation reads:

For heroic efforts to save from drowning Wellington Brocar, landsman, of the Tallapoosa, off New Orleans, 15 July 1866.

Robinson died on May 12, 1915, at the Soldier's Home. He was buried in Lakewood Cemetery.

== See also ==
- List of Medal of Honor recipients in non-combat incidents
