= Paul Henry Lang =

Hungarian-American musicologist

Paul Henry Lang (August 28, 1901 – September 21, 1991) was a Hungarian-American musicologist and music critic.

== Career ==
Lang was born as "Pál Láng" in Budapest, Hungary, and was educated in Catholic schools. In 1918, as World War I was coming to an end, he was drafted into the Austro-Hungarian army though he had not completed school, and sent to the Italian front. When the war ended, he had to make his own way home, and then studied at the University of Budapest and the Budapest Music Academy, under Zoltán Kodály and Erno Dohnanyi, among others. Kodály, learning that he only played piano, assigned him to learn to play the bassoon. After graduating in 1922, he was an assistant conductor at the Budapest Opera, but was encouraged to study musicology by Kodály and Béla Bartók. At that time serious study in musicology was only available in France and Germany. He began at the University of Heidelberg where he attended classes in philosophy and literature as well. He was not happy in Germany and moved on to the Sorbonne in Paris, where he studied with Andre Pirro. In the 1924 Summer Olympics Lang participated as part of the French National rowing team. He supported himself by playing bassoon in various orchestras and also conducted an emigrant Hungarian chorus. While a student in Paris he began his career as a music critic, writing for the Revue Musicale. He completed his dissertation on French lute music, but was not awarded his doctoral degree because he could not afford the large sum needed to engrave the unpublished scores he was discussing and print the dissertation, as required by the university.

In 1928, knowing no English, Lang moved to the United States as a junior scholar of the Rockefeller Foundation. He took a few English classes and then picked up more from motion pictures. He taught music, including harmony and counterpoint, for a year at Vassar College (1930–31), filling in for a professor on sabbatical. Then at Wells College (1932–34), he taught music history and analysis and led the chapel choir. At the same time he worked on a dissertation on the literary history of French opera, earning a doctorate degree from Cornell University in 1934.

Having by now published a few articles in English, he was invited to teach at both Wellesley College and Columbia. For one year he taught at both colleges. Lang joined the music faculty of Columbia University in 1934 with the first professorship of musicology in America, and quickly began changing the way music was taught there by adding courses, such as the esthetics of music, and by expanding the musicology department. In 1940, after Bartók fled Hungary during World War II, Lang arranged for Columbia to hire him as an ethnomusicologist. As musicology was a nascent field at the time, Lang had a strong influence on its development, especially in the United States, and advised a number of students who would go on to become prominent musicologists, including James McKinnon, Dika Newlin, Joel Sachs, Rose Rosengard Subotnik, Richard Taruskin, Piero Weiss, and Neal Zaslaw.

Lang became best known for his often provocative articles and books on both contemporary trends in music and music history. He was from 1954 to 1964 the chief music critic for the New York Herald Tribune, succeeding Virgil Thomson, and was editor of The Musical Quarterly from 1945 to 1973. He published a number of books, the most famous of which is Music in Western Civilization (1941), called "[a] model of scholarship and style" by Will Durant. He was an adviser to his publisher, W.W. Norton, and edited several books for them. He was a founding member of the American Musicological Society and in 1955 was elected for a term as president of the International Musicological Society.

In addition to his most famous work, Music in Western Civilization, Lang wrote George Frideric Handel, collaborated with Otto Bettmann on A Pictorial History of Music, and edited several compilations, including The Creative World of Mozart and One Hundred Years of Music in America.

In 1936 he married Anne Pecheux, a Barnard graduate who had taken his undergraduate music history course. They had four children.

Among Lang's pupils were Mary Ann Feldman and Walter H. Rubsamen.

He died in Lakeville, Connecticut, aged 90.

== Bibliography ==
- Kozinn, Allan (September 24, 1991). "Paul Lang, Musicologist and Critic, Is Dead at 90". The New York Times.
