= Stephen E. Chandler =

Union soldier recipient of the Medal of Honor (1841–1919)

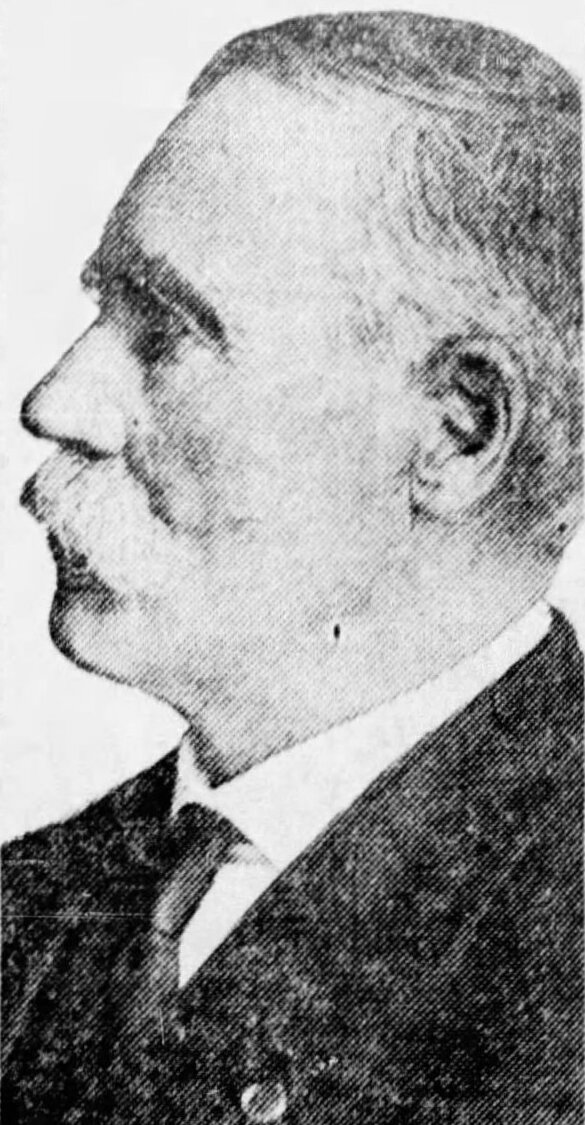
- Chandler in a 1919 newspaper
- Born: Stephen Edwin Chandler; November 20, 1841; Battle Creek, Michigan, U.S.
- Died: February 1, 1919 (aged 77); Minneapolis, Minnesota, U.S.
- Burial place: Lakewood Cemetery
- Military career
- Allegiance: United States of America
- Branch: United States Army
- Service years: 1861–1865
- Rank: Quartermaster Sergeant
- Unit: (New York (state)) 24th Regiment New York Volunteer Cavalry
- Conflicts: Battle of Amelia Springs
- Awards: Medal of Honor

Stephen Edwin Chandler (November 20, 1841 – February 1, 1919) was an American soldier who fought in the American Civil War. Chandler received the country's highest award for bravery during combat, the Medal of Honor, for his action at the Battle of Amelia Springs on April 5, 1865. He was honored with the award on April 4, 1898.

== Biography ==
Chandler was born in Battle Creek, Michigan, on November 20, 1841. He initially joined the 24th New York Infantry in May 1861 and mustered out with this regiment in May 1863. He re-enlisted with the 24th New York Cavalry in October 1863, and was promoted to Quartermaster Sergeant two months later. He was transferred to the 1st New York Provisional Cavalry in June 1865; he mustered out again the following month. Chandler died on February 1, 1919, at his home on Pleasant Avenue in Minneapolis. He was buried in Lakewood Cemetery in Minneapolis.

== Medal of Honor citation ==
Under severe fire of the enemy and of the troops in retreat, went between the lines to the assistance of a wounded and helpless comrade, and rescued him from death or capture.

== See also ==
- List of American Civil War Medal of Honor recipients: A–F
