= Petra Fandrem Howard =

American labor advocate for the deaf

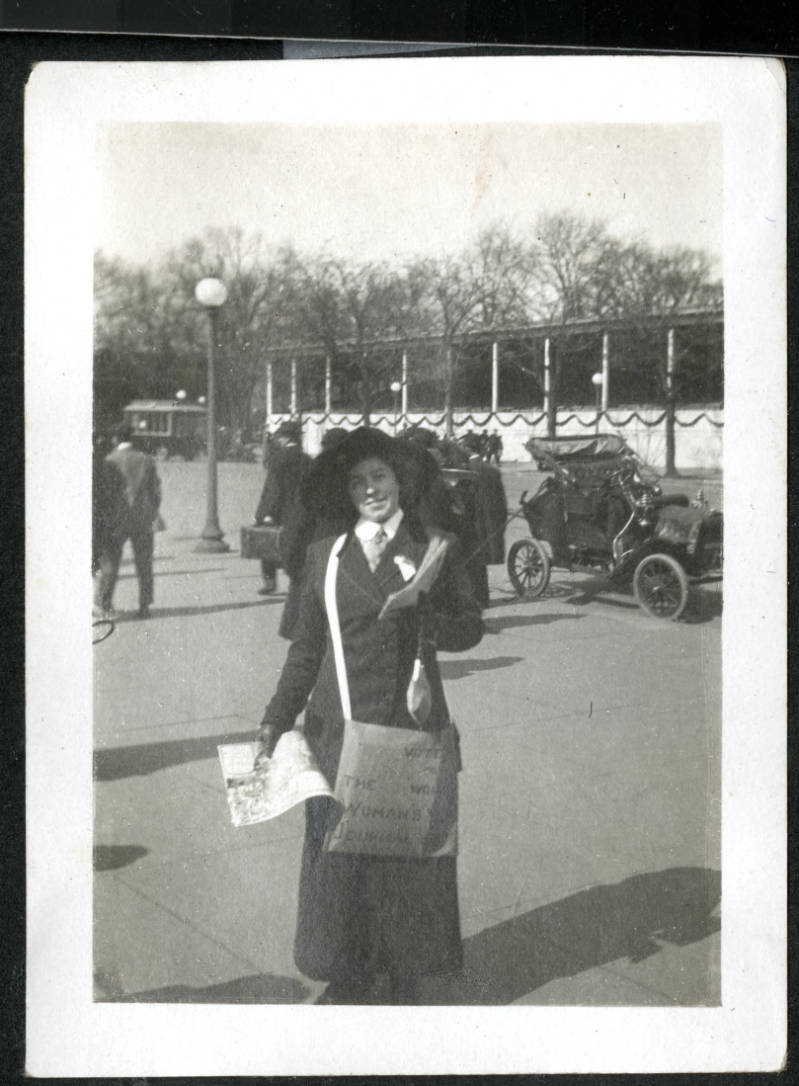
- Born: November 9, 1891; Minneapolis
- Died: March 5, 1971 (aged 79)
- Known for: deaf labor advocacy

Petra Fandrem Howard (November 9, 1891 – March 5, 1971) was an American deaf labor advocate. Hard of hearing from a young age, she was the first employee in the Minnesota Labor Bureau for the Deaf, created to support deaf workers and encourage employers to hire the deaf. Howard worked in vocational rehabilitation for the deaf for over forty years.

== Early life and education ==
Petra Fandrem was born November 9, 1891, in Minneapolis, Minnesota. She became hard of hearing at age five, but had enough residual hearing to interpret for deaf people as an adult.

Fandrem attended public schools for several years before transferring to the Minnesota School for the Deaf. She was a student in the first oral education class at the school and graduated in 1907. She attended Gallaudet College, helping to organize a sorority during her time at the school. Fandrem graduated from Gallaudet College in 1912.

== Career and advocacy for the deaf ==
Fandrem was an activist for women's suffrage in the early 1910s.

The Division for the Deaf, a department of the Minnesota Department of Labor and Industry, was created by an act of the Minnesota legislature in 1913, the first such effort in the United States. It was funded in 1915 and Fandrem was appointed its first chief. Fandrem was selected from a pool of civil service candidates because as a hard of hearing person who could speak clearly and sign using American Sign Language she could move easily between the deaf and hearing communities. She had a budget of just $1,000 per year to travel throughout Minnesota and provide services for 1,000 deaf adults and 350 deaf students. She reported that employers regularly dismissed deaf applicants and argued that writing instructions to deaf workers was too time-consuming. Fandrem worked to convince employers that deaf workers were particularly efficient and possessed excellent concentration.

She resigned the job in 1916 to marry Jay Cooke Howard, the president of the National Association of the Deaf. Petra was Jay Cooke Howard's third wife; they would later divorce.

Even after resigning, Howard continued her efforts in supporting deaf people. In 1920 she wrote in the deaf newspaper The Silent Worker about the work of the Minnesota Labor Bureau for the Deaf, explaining that it was not just an employment office but also provided support such as working to decrease misunderstandings between employers and employees as well as providing interpretation and information for the deaf. In this work Howard also strove to educate hearing people, emphasizing the abilities of deaf workers.

Howard returned to the Minnesota Labor Bureau for the Deaf in 1929 and worked there until 1956. From 1956 until her retirement three years later, she worked in the Minnesota Vocational Rehabilitation Department as a specialist for the deaf. She taught the American manual alphabet and basic signs to supervisors and coworkers to facilitate communication with deaf employees. Howard worked closely with the Minnesota School for the Deaf to promote vocational training and help students acquire apprenticeships with local businesses.

In 1941 Howard became the first woman president of the Minnesota Association of the Deaf; she served in that role until 1946. She was active in other organizations and her work included serving on the board of directors for the Gallaudet College Alumni Association.

Gallaudet College conferred an honorary Doctor of Letters degree on Howard in 1960.

== Death and legacy ==
Howard died March 5, 1971. She was buried in Lakewood Cemetery in Minneapolis.

She was elected to the Gallaudet University Hall of Fame in 2014. A residential therapeutic center in St. Paul, Minnesota was named the Petra Howard House. An auditorium inside Quinn Hall at the campus of Minnesota State Academy for the Deaf is named the Petra Howard Auditorium.
