= Emma A. Cranmer =

American temperance reformer and feminist (1858–1937)

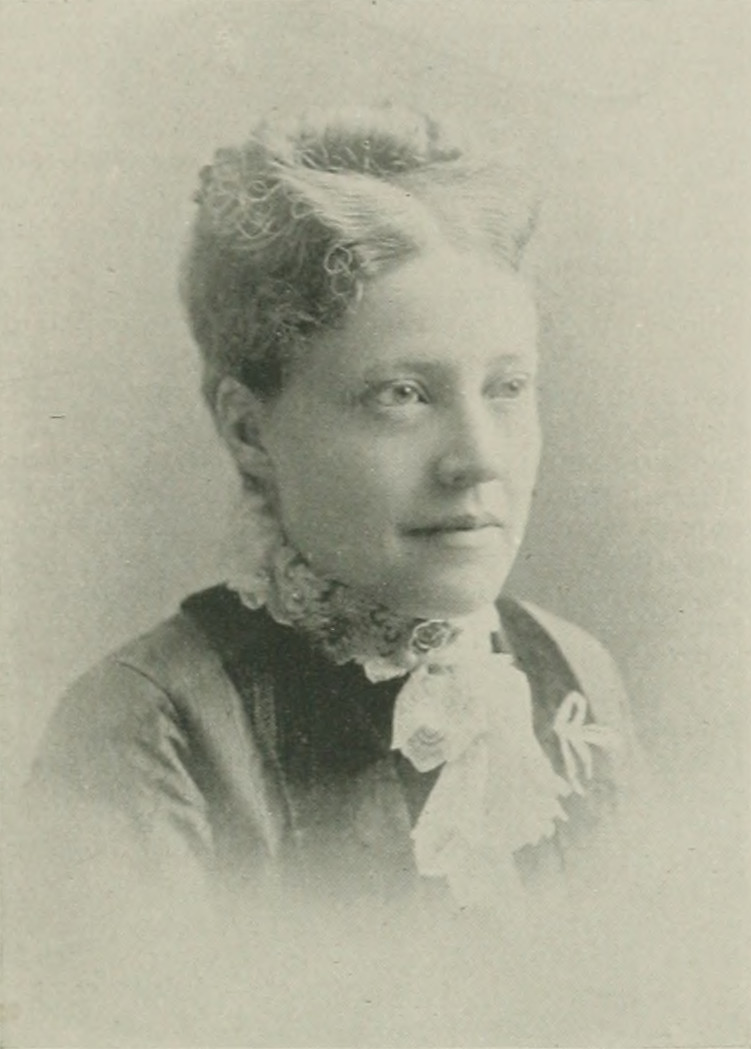
- Photo in A Woman of the Century
- Born: Emma Amelia Powers; October 2, 1858; Mount Vernon, Wisconsin, U.S.
- Died: January 11, 1937 (aged 78); Minnesota, U.S.
- Resting place: Lakewood Cemetery, Minneapolis, Minnesota, U.S.
- Education: Cornell College
- Occupations: temperance reformer, woman suffragist, author, lecturer
- Spouse(s): Delos N. Goodell (m. 1880; died 1882), Simeon Harris Cranmer (m. 1884)
- Children: Frances Willard Cranmer Greenman
- Writing career
- Language: English
- Genres: prose, verse, epigram
- Literary movement: suffrage, temperance

Emma A. Cranmer (née, Powers; after first marriage, Goodell; after second marriage, Cranmer; October 2, 1858 – January 11, 1937) was an American temperance reformer, woman suffragist, and author. A talented suffrage speaker and prohibition representative, she served as president of the South Dakota Woman's Christian Temperance Union (WCTU) and the South Dakota Equal Suffrage Association. Some of her epigrams were published by the press.

== Early life and education ==
Emma Amelia Powers was born in Mount Vernon, Wisconsin, October 2, 1858. She was the daughter of Dr. Joseph Lewis Powers and Janette S. (Byam) Cranmer. Her siblings were Julia C. Powers (born 1856), Laura B. Powers (born 1865), Fred Willard Powers (born 1868), and Leland Earnest Powers (born 1871).

She was educated in Cornell College.

== Career ==
She began to teach school when fifteen years old. In 1880, she married Delos N. Goodell, who died in 1882.

In October, 1884, she married secondly, Hon. Simeon Harris Cranmer (1853–1943), a Nebraska teacher and lawyer. They made their home in Aberdeen, South Dakota in 1889, after he became president of the Union Banking Company.

In 1890, Mr. and Mrs. Cranmer established an industrial school for young woman who had jobs but did not have previous education, which included no-cost instruction in literature, mathematics, reading, and writing.

Cranmer wrote much for the press, both in prose and verse. Epigrams published by the press included, “Applause is like strychnine, it either acts as a tonic or a poison", “Drunkenness is a disease to be treated by the physician and not the policeman”, and “What is needed in our progress is more schools and fewer jails".

She lectured on literary subjects and on temperance in many of the cities of the Northwest. As an orator she was eloquent and winning. She was an earnest worker in the white ribbon movement, with which she was connected for years, and served as president of the South Dakota Woman's Christian Temperance Union (WCTU). On June 9, 1893, she attended the World's Temperance Congress in Washington D.C. and sat on the platform during the opening by Matilda Carse.

As part of her work with the WCTU, she lobbied for stricter divorce laws, helping to establish a requirement that people live in South Dakota for at least six months (increased from three months) before they could obtain a divorce there.

In equal suffrage, she was profoundly interested, and served as president of the South Dakota Equal Suffrage Association. Through efforts of Cranmer and Anna R. Simmons, a bill was secured for a constitutional amendment from the South Dakota Legislature of 1893. In addition to Simmons, her contemporaries in South Dakota included, Irene G. Adams and Ida R. Bailey.

== Personal life ==
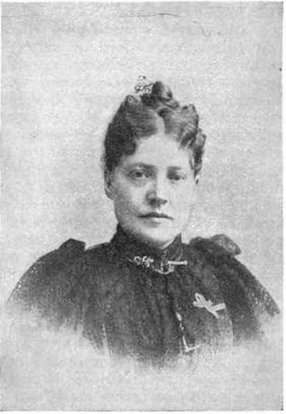
Emma A. Cranmer

Cranmer became a member of the Methodist Episcopal Church in her early childhood, and was a class leader in her church. Later, she became a Christian Science practitioner.

She had one child, a daughter, Frances Willard Cranmer.

Emma Amelia Cranmer died January 11, 1937, in Minnesota, and is buried at Lakewood Cemetery in Minneapolis.
