= Anthony Cassius =

Anthony Brutus Cassiua
- Born: June 29, 1907; Meridian, Logan County, Oklahoma
- Died: August 1, 1983 (aged 76); Minneapolis, Minnesota
- Resting place: Lakewood Cemetery

Anthony Brutus Cassius (June 29, 1907 – August 1, 1983) was an African-American businessman, activist, and labor organizer in Minneapolis. He organized an all-Black waiters union at the Curtis Hotel in 1935 and owned three bars which were some of the first consistently integrated spaces in Minneapolis.

== Biography ==
=== Early life ===
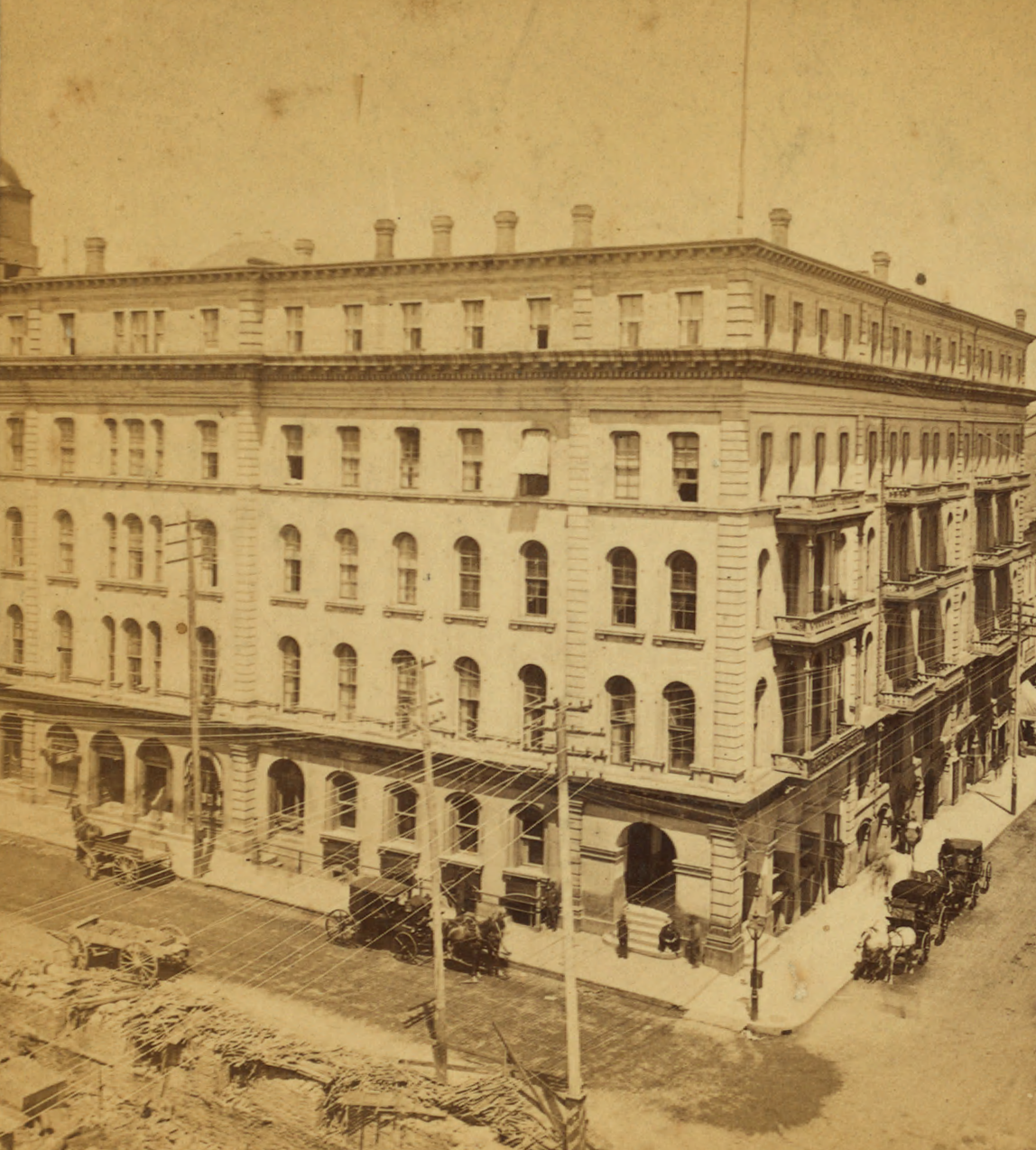
The Merchants Hotel where Cassius worked as a porter.

Cassius was born in 1907 to Minister Samuel Robert Cassius and Selina Cassius who were both formerly enslaved in Virginia and Texas respectively. He was raised on a 380-acre farm in Meridian, Oklahoma. He came to Minnesota in 1922. His father sent him to Minneapolis at the age of 13, months after the Tulsa Race Massacre, with his brother Benjamin and less than $15. He was carrying his sheepskin diploma from junior high. Cassius got a porter job at the Merchants Hotel and slept on a mattress in the basement, where he stayed until he graduated from Central High School in St. Paul. He also attended the Pilgrim Baptist Church. In an oral history with the Minnesota Historical Society remembering his early life, he said:

"This was a prejudiced town, St. Paul-Minneapolis. Back then the only thing you could do was go to school. There was no prejudice in the school system. Because there wasn't enough [of us] to constitute a threat. The class I graduated in was 1,200, and there were only two or three colored in the whole school."

Cassius was a top football star, athlete, and student. Without scholarship opportunities but with the help of his football coach, Cassius enrolled at Macalester College's divinity school on a reduced tuition. But after a year, Cassius was married to Florence Cassius with two kids and he decided to leave school and seek work.

Cassius began working as a waiter at the Curtis Hotel in Minneapolis. He worked for $17 per month as part of a team of all-Black waiters, while white waiters at comparable hotels would make $75. He was also not allowed to stay or dine at the hotel.

=== Organizing ===
Cassius formed the Minnesota Club in his early 20s, which was a group of civil rights activist who protested a screening of the movie "The Birth of A Nation" in downtown Minneapolis and other issues. The group met at Fosters Sweet Shoppe which allowed them to gather if they purchased ice cream. Through his organizing work, he connected with other African-American civil rights leaders in Minnesota including Lena Olive Smith.

Cassius organized the all-Black waiters union at the Curtis Hotel in 1935 after learning that white waiters made more money than Black waiters. The Hotel and Restaurant Workers Union did not accept Black members, so Cassius organized Local 614 of the Hotel and Restaurant Waiters Union. He also worked, along with other organizers such as Nellie Stone Johnson, to organize Local 665 which was the first integrated union in Minnesota, including Black, Greek, and Scandinavian employees. Cassius sued the hotel with the backing of the Teamsters and won a $13,000 wage increase and $3,500 in back pay for Black waiters in 1940.

Cassius's labor involvement deepened and he manned soup kitchens during the 1934 Teamsters' trucker strike, was a delegate to the 1936 Farmer-Labor convention, registered Black voters, and made connections at the Bulgarian-Macedonian Workers Club. Eventually, he was fired from his job at the Curtis Hotel due to his organizing, and was even harassed by the FBI.

=== Bar owner ===
Over 47 years, Cassius owned three bars which were known as some of the first and consistently integrated spaces in Minneapolis. In 1937, Cassius purchased a building at 38th Street and 4th Avenue South, which he named the Dreamland Café. The site was in part of segregated Minneapolis and across the street from the headquarters for the Minnesota Spokesman-Recorder. During World War II, Dreamland was deemed non-essential to the war effort (while similar white businesses were allowed to run as essential) and Cassius worked full-time at a St. Paul defense plant and kept Dreamland open. He was also a member and officer of the Nacerima Club, a social club in the same African-American neighborhood and business district that Dreamland was located.

In the late 1940s, Cassius received a loan for $10,000 from Midland Bank after speaking with the bank president, Mr. Ueland, and became the first Black man to secure a full liquor license from Minneapolis. He opened the Cassius Bar and Playroom in downtown Minneapolis at 207 South 3rd Street. It moved to 318 South 3rd Street in 1958 due to neighborhood redevelopment and remained there until 1980.

Cassius was a sports fan and supported African-American sports clubs in the Twin Cities. He brought Jackie Robinson to Minneapolis to speak when he was serving as the president of the Urban League, sponsored softball and baseball teams, and was the president of the Golden Gloves youth boxing program. He also enjoyed travelling to watch sports and took photographs of famous African-American athletes like Muhammad Ali and Joe Louis. He commissioned local artists to paint some of these moments and displayed the paintings in his restaurant.

Cassius died on August 1, 1983. He is buried at Lakewood Cemetery.

== Legacy ==
Anthony Taylor purchased the former Dreamland space to revitalize the local community and to be a safe space for Black people and activists and pointed to Cassius as inspiration.

Information about Cassius, including historic photographs, are held in the John F. Glanton Collection at the Hennepin County Library. Four of the paintings Cassius commissioned were purchased by the Minnesota Historical Society shortly before his death.
