= Kenneth Rand =

American poet (1891–1918)

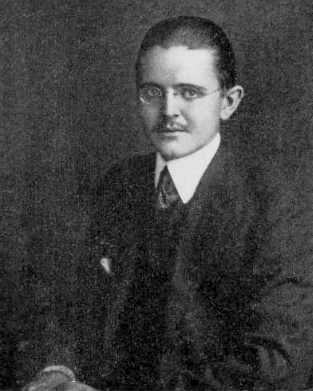
- At Yale in 1914
- Born: May 8, 1891; Minneapolis, Minnesota, U.S.
- Died: October 15, 1918 (aged 27); Washington, D.C., U.S.
- Resting place: Lakewood Cemetery
- Education: Phillips Academy; Yale University
- Occupations: Poet, Quartermaster Corps of U.S. Army
- Known for: The Dirge of the Sea-Children and Other Poems (1913); The Rainbow Chaser and Other Poems (1914); The Dreamer and Other Poems (1915); Limited Service Only (1919)
- Spouse: Florence (Jackson) Rand

Kenneth Rand (1891–1918) was an American poet. An English literature graduate of Yale University, he served as chairman of the board of the Yale Literary Magazine, served as literary editor of the Yale Courant, contributed to campus humor magazine The Yale Record, was a member of the Elizabethan Club and was the class poet. He was one of the poets to whom The Yale Book of Student Verse, 1910–1919 was dedicated.

== Early life ==
Rand was born in Minneapolis, Minnesota, on May 8, 1891, the son of Alonzo Turner Rand, president of the Minneapolis Gas Company, and Louise Casey Rand. Much of his early life was spent in travel, especially in Europe. He attended Phillips Academy in Andover, Massachusetts, for three years, where he was a member of the Mandolin Club and wrote for a student publication, The Mirror. He was not overly popular there, but was thought to be unusually introspective.

After graduating from Phillips Academy in 1910 he attended Yale University, where he majored in English literature and was a member of the Elizabethan Club. Author George Henry Nettleton called Rand's class poem, written as a senior, an unconscious prophecy.

The years have dropped behind us,
The years run out before,
The testing world shall find us
Full weight—we trust—and more.

== Career ==
After graduating from Yale in 1914, Rand gave his attention chiefly to writing. He published three volumes of poetry (listed below), and his poems were published in literary and fiction journals of the time, including The Bellman, The Argosy, Lippincott's, Snappy Stories, Sport Story Magazine, Picture-Play Weekly, Top-Notch, and The Smart Set.

== World War I ==
When war broke out Rand greatly desired to enter the military. He volunteered for the Navy and all available Army branches, including the Aviation Corps, Infantry, and Artillery, and even attempted to enlist in the Canadian Army, but was rejected because of his poor eyesight. He was able finally to enlist in the Quartermaster Corps, and was stationed at Camp Meigs in Washington DC. He was recommended to be sent to Camp Joseph E. Johnston, the main Quartermaster mobilization and training camp, for officers' training, but after only 60 days at Camp Meigs he contracted influenza (this was during the great "Spanish flu" pandemic of 1918) and was sent to Walter Reed Hospital, where he died on October 15, 1918. He was twenty-seven years old. He was buried in Lakewood Cemetery.

In his poem "Straw-Death", Rand speaks eloquently of his regret at the prospect of dying in a sickbed instead of as a man of action. His final poem, "Limited Service Only", written a few days before his death, was found in his uniform and at the time was considered one of the genuine poetic expressions of fervor and patriotism written during the Great War. The War Department published the poem on December 2, 1918, along with a preface praising the "limited service men" who sought active service but (for physical limitations or other reasons) were denied the privilege of joining the combatant forces of the United States.

Limited Service Only

I am not one of those the gods' decision
Has chosen for that highest gift of all –
The sacrifice, the splendor, and the vision –
To fight, and nobly fall:

And yet I know – what though it be but dreaming!
Should the day hang on some last desperate hope,
I – I – could lead one reckless column streaming
Down some shell-tortured slope.

To face the shadow-hell of Death's own Valley
With eyes unclouded and unlowered head –
Know, for an instant, one ecstatic rally
And then be cleanly dead.

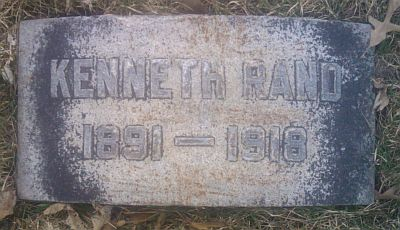
Lakewood Cemetery, Minneapolis

Kenneth Rand's body was sent home to Minneapolis, where he was buried in uniform. The poet Harold Crawford Stearns, a classmate in Rand's graduating class at Phillips Academy, memorialized Rand in a poem entitled Vale, Kenneth Rand. It concluded,

Oh, Kenneth, how could dreams like ours be false?
Our Avalons, our bright Hesperides,
Our Inds, our islands washed by tropic seas
All faded … faded … echoes of a waltz…
You go (O world he reaches, hold him dear!);
I stay, to tend the embers falling here.

== Works ==
- The Dirge of the Sea-Children and Other Poems (Boston, Sherman, French & Company, 1913)
- The Rainbow Chaser and Other Poems (Boston, Sherman, French & Company, 1914)
- The Dreamer and Other Poems (Boston, Sherman, French & Company, 1915)

=== Selected poems ===
- "Atheism"
- "The Crows"
- "Eros Ephemeros"
- "The Flower-Peddler"
- "The Lonely Road"
- "Lover's Dawn"
- "The Old Lovers"
- "The Prodigal"
- "The Rainbow Chaser"
- "Sonnet"
- "Spring in the Semi-Tropics"
- "Straw-Death"
- "The Suicide"
- "To All Ye Motherless"
- "To the Dream Maiden"
- "The True Magic"
