= Clifford C. Sommer =

American businessman and politician

Clifford C. Sommer (May 25, 1908 – December 12, 1993) was an American businessman and politician.

Sommer was born in Minneapolis, Minnesota. He served in the United States Navy during World War II and was commissioned a lieutenant commander. Sommer received his bachelor's degree from the University of Minnesota and his master's degree in banking from Rutgers University. Sommer also went to law school for two years. He lived with his wife and family in Owatonna, Minnesota and was involved with the banking and loan businesses. Sommer served in the Minnesota Senate from 1967 to 1970. He died at the Friendship Village Health Care Center in Bloomington, Minnesota. The funeral was in Minneapolis, Minnesota. He was interred in Lakewood Cemetery.
