= Lakewood Cemetery =

- Lakewood Cemetery Memorial Chapel
- U.S. National Register of Historic Places
- Minneapolis Landmark
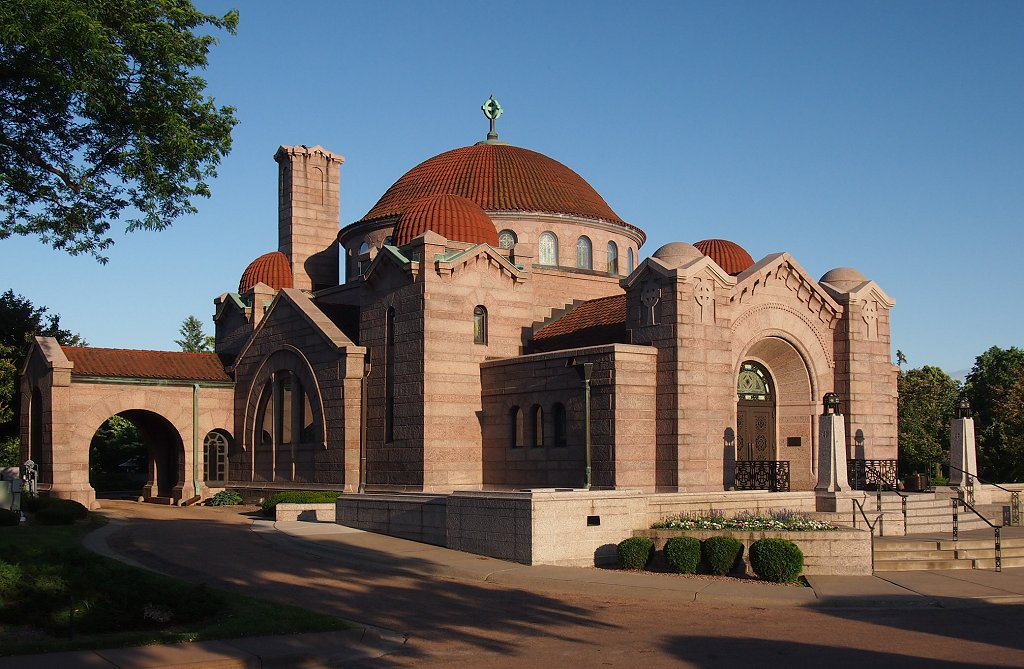
- The Byzantine-styled chapel at Lakewood Cemetery is listed on the National Register of Historic Places

- Location within Minnesota Location within the United States
- Location: 3600 Hennepin Avenue; Minneapolis, Minnesota
- Coordinates: 44°56′11″N 93°17′56″W
- Area: 250 acres (100 ha)
- Built: 1908
- Architect: Harry Wild Jones
- Architectural style: Byzantine Revival
- Website: www.lakewoodcemetery.org
- NRHP reference No.: 83003657

Significant dates
- Added to NRHP: October 20, 1983
- Designated MPLSL: 1984

Lakewood Cemetery is a large private, non-sectarian, rural cemetery located in Minneapolis, Minnesota, United States. It is located at 3600 Hennepin Avenue at the southern end of the Uptown area. It is noted for its chapel which is on the National Register of Historic Places and was modeled after the Hagia Sophia in Istanbul, Turkey.

== History ==
About 250 acres in size, Lakewood memorializes the dead with more than 200,000 monuments, markers and memorializations. Long considered one of the most beautiful cemeteries in the country, it was modeled after the rural cemeteries of 19th-century France, such as Père-Lachaise in Paris. When Lakewood was established in 1871 rural cemeteries were becoming more popular as part of a growing trend away from churchyard burials in the heart of the city.

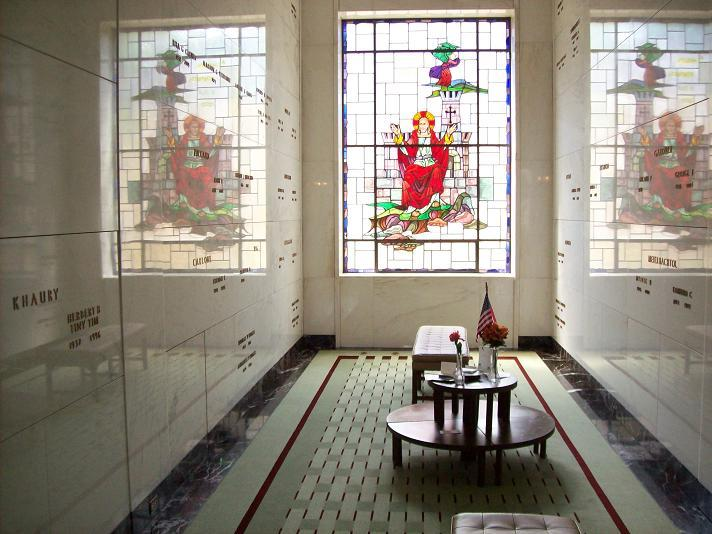
Stained glass window in one of the Mausoleum rooms; Tiny Tim's tomb can be seen at left

In July 1871 Colonel William S. King, local businessman and newspaper publisher, proposed to community leaders of the city that they work together to establish a cemetery "on some of the beautiful locations out near the lakes, where the encroachments of the city would never seriously interfere." In August of the same year a meeting was held for establishing the Lyndale Cemetery Association (Changed to Lakewood in Feb of 1872). According to the minutes of the original meeting recorded by Thomas Lowry, "that after an examination of various localities they had chosen the land owned by William S. King lying between Lakes Calhoun and Harriet." Colonel King agreed to sell his land for the purpose at a cost of $21,000, "to be paid back over a year at 7 percent interest." The first trustees voted to raise $25,000 to purchase the land and make improvements at a time when the cost of a home in Minneapolis was about $500. The money was raised by selling 250 shares of stock at $100 a piece, two-thirds of which was purchased by the trustees themselves. The remaining balance was solicited by a committee and sold to other local investors. In April 1872 Superintendent A.B. Barton and the board of trustees employed C. W. Folsom, Superintendent of Mount Auburn Cemetery in Cambridge, Massachusetts to develop plans for the new cemetery. In October 1872 the Association reacquired all stocks that had been sold to the public.

The public dedication of Lakewood was held on September 16, 1872, with "a large number of lots being selected at the close of the exercise by the citizens present." Many of the earliest lots sold in the 1870s-1880s remained unused until 1972 when they were reclaimed for resale to the public. The first person buried in Lakewood Cemetery was Maggie Menzel who died on January 24, 1872, at the age of nineteen.

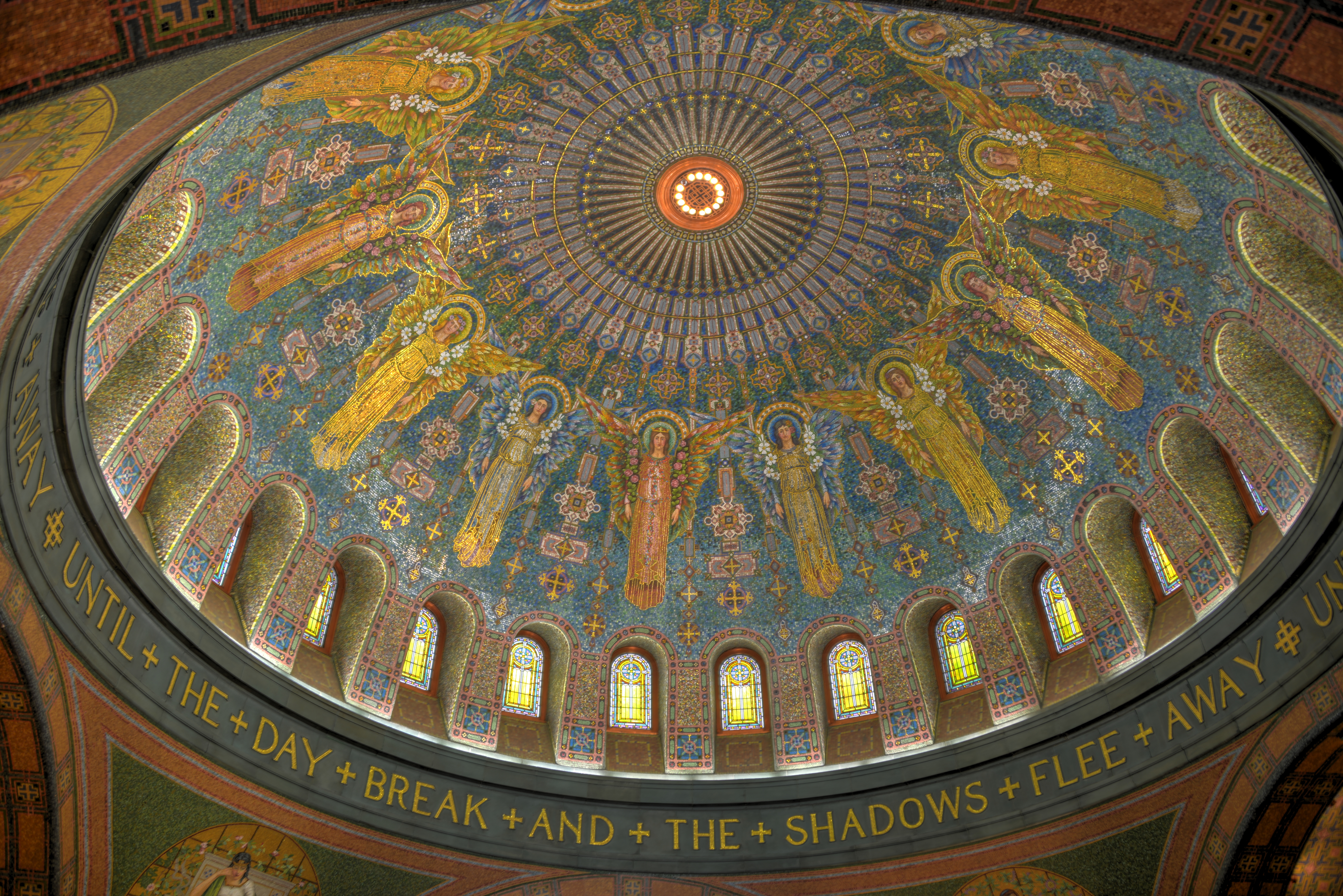
Interior of the Memorial Chapel dome

Architect Harry Wild Jones designed the cemetery's chapel which began construction in August 1908. Built of the finest materials, the chapel seats about 200 and is renowned for its beauty and superb acoustics. The dome is 65 feet high with 24 stained glass windows inset its full circumference. Charles R. Lamb of New York orchestrated the design of the chapel's interior mosaic artwork. Six highly skilled artists of Italy were enlisted to create 10 million tessellae in Venice, which were then shipped to Lakewood, where those same artists performed the arduous task of assembling them in the chapel's interior. Completed in 1910, the chapel's total cost of construction was $150,000. Lakewood Chapel was added to the National Register of Historic Places on October 20, 1983.

Cremation services were begun in 1910 and have continued to the present day. In 1965-67 a community mausoleum and columbarium was built with enough space for over 5000 crypts and niches. One of the building's more notable features are the 24 eight-foot stained glass windows by Willet Stained Glass Studios of Philadelphia. A large reflecting pool just outside the mausoleum's east side extends toward the garden crypt area and Lakewood's historic chapel nearby.

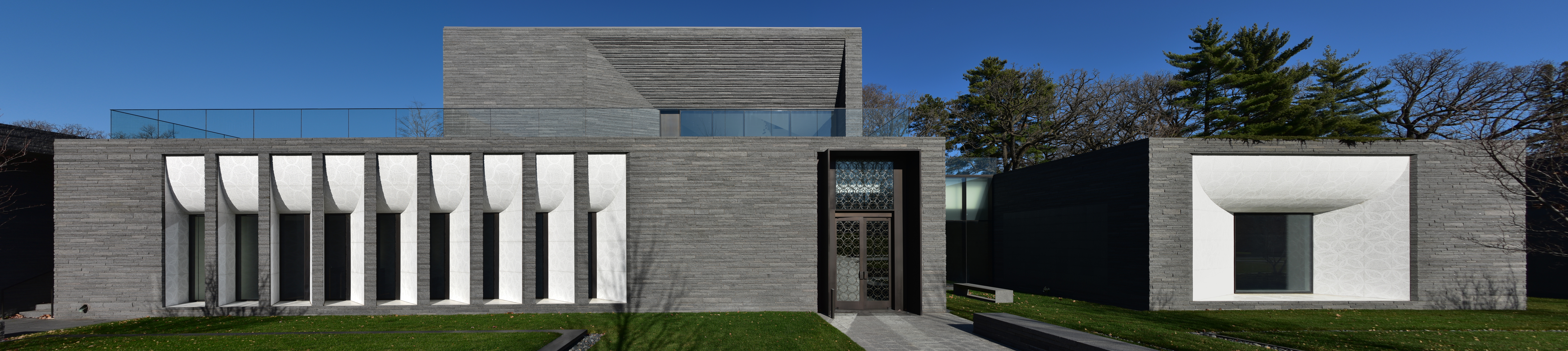
The Garden Mausoleum

In 2012, a new Garden Mausoleum, designed by HGA Architects of Minneapolis, was opened alongside the reflecting pool, adding a further 879 crypts and 4,620 cremation niches.

Since its inception in 1872 Lakewood has continued to operate as a non-profit, non-denominational cemetery providing funeral services to the public. Many Minneapolis streets, parks, and monuments bear the names of the Lakewood's original founders — Thomas Lowry, William D. Washburn, and Charles M. Loring, to name a few. The cemetery itself memorializes many notable persons, including former Vice President Hubert H. Humphrey, Civil War General Lewis A. Grant, and Senator Paul Wellstone who was killed in a plane crash in 2002. There is one British Commonwealth war grave, of a World War I Canadian soldier.

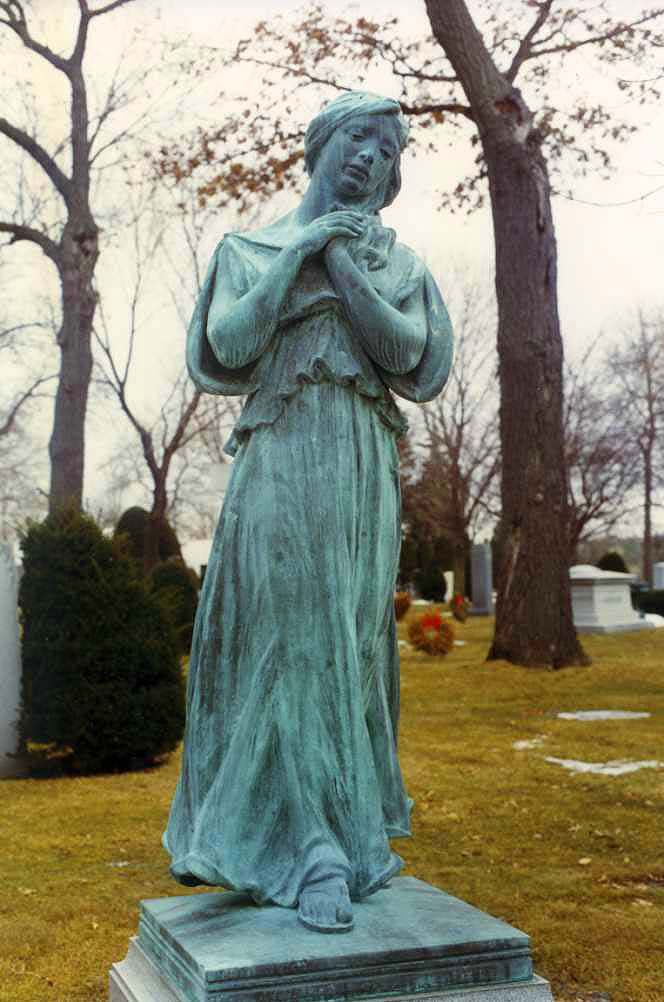
McMullen monument by sculptor Nellie Walker

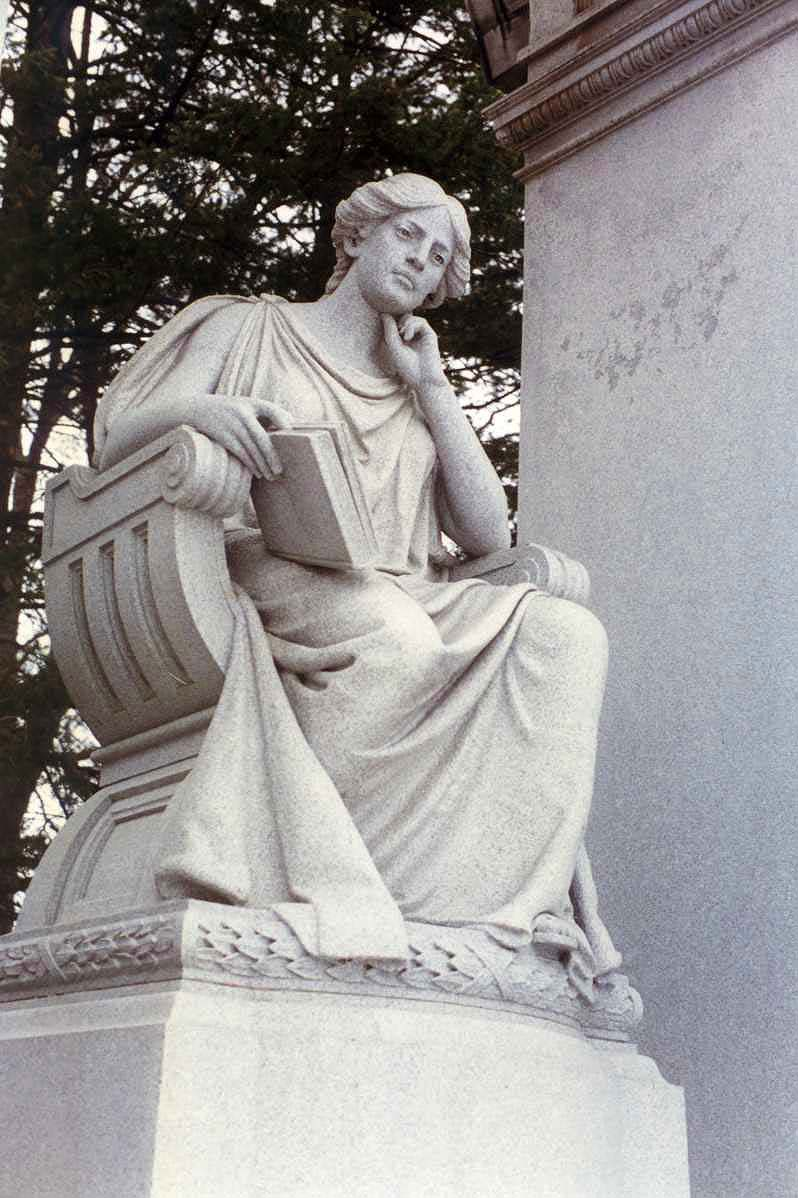
Fridley Monument

== Notable burials ==
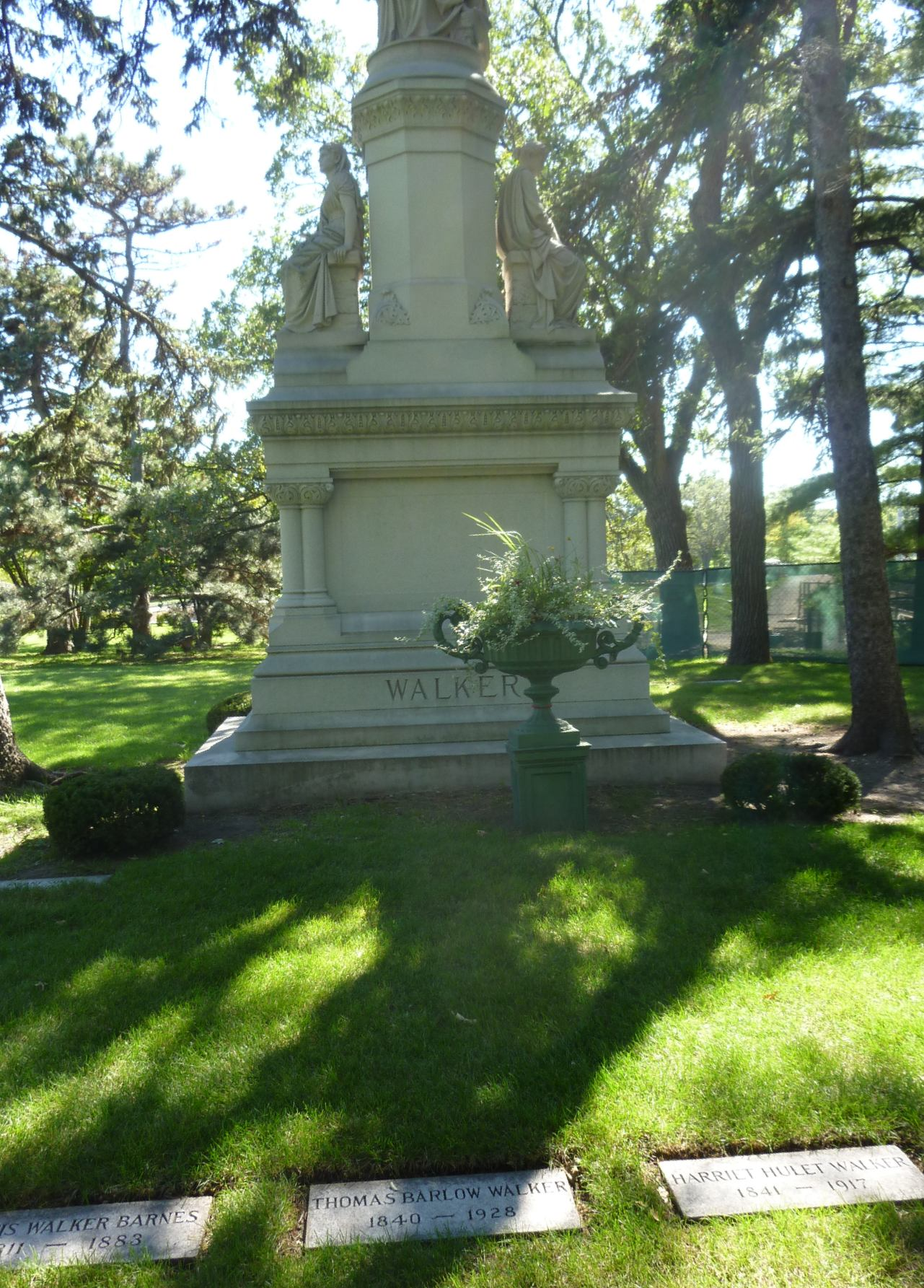
Monument for the family of T. B. Walker

- Albert Abdallah (1878–1968), founder of Abdallah Candies
- Cedric Adams (1902–1961), journalist and radio personality of Minnesota
- Charles Edward Adams (1867–1936), Lieutenant Governor of Minnesota and state senator
- Robert N. Adams (1835–1914), Union brevet brigadier general
- Cyrus Aldrich (1808–1871), U.S. Representative from Minnesota
- John G. Alexander (1893–1971), U.S. Representative from Minnesota
- Eli B. Ames (1820–1898), mayor of Minneapolis
- Frank Maloy Anderson (1871–1961), author and historian
- Sydney Anderson (1881–1948), U.S. Representative from Minnesota
- Wendell R. Anderson (1933–2016), governor of Minnesota
- William A. Anderson (1873–1954), judge and mayor of Minneapolis
- Earnest Andersson (1878–1943), composer and inventor
- Buzz Arlett (1899–1964), baseball player, sometimes known as the "Babe Ruth of the minor leagues."
- Moses K. Armstrong (1832–1906), surveyor and U.S. Representative from the Dakota Territory
- Douglass H. Atwill (1881–1960), bishop of the Episcopal Diocese of North Dakota
- Edward C. Babb (1834–1899), mayor of Minneapolis
- Bert Baston (1894–1979), American football player
- William F. Beck (1904–1966), Bible translator
- Charles E. Bell (1858–1932), architect
- Alfred L. Bergerud (1899–1977), state politician and lawyer
- John M. Berry (1827–1887), state politician and judge
- Ossie Bluege (1900–1985), baseball player and manager
- Bill Boyer (died 1973), businessman and founder of the Minnesota Vikings
- George A. Brackett (1836–1921), businessman and mayor of Minneapolis
- William Frederick Brooks (1863–1928), state senator
- Robert S. Brown (1863–1927), first Black physician in Minneapolis
- Joseph A. A. Burnquist (1879–1961), state politician, Attorney General of Minnesota, Governor of Minnesota
- Douglass Cadwallader (1884–1971), golfer
- Frederick William Cappelen (1857–1921), architect and civil engineer
- Thomas Gantz Cassady (1896–1972), World War I fighter ace
- Curt Carlson (1914–1999), founder of Radisson Hotels
- Anthony Cassius (1907-1983), black businessman and labor organizer
- Stephen E. Chandler (1841–1919), Union Army soldier recipient of the Medal of Honor
- Leeann Chin (1933–2010), restaurateur and businesswoman
- Horace Cleveland (1814–1900), landscape architect
- Serenus Colburn (1871–1927), architect
- L. J. Cooke (1868–1943), college basketball coach
- Cora Alta Ray Corniea (1889–1958), conservationist
- Emma A. Cranmer (1858–1937), temperance reformer, women suffragist, and writer
- John Crosby (1828–1887), founder of the Washburn-Crosby Company, the forerunner to General Mills
- Perry Crosier (1890–1953), architect
- H. David Dalquist (1918–2005), inventor of the Bundt pan, and founder of Nordic Ware
- Ron Daws (1937–1992), one of three USA 1968 Mexico Olympic Marathon racers; finished 22nd
- George Dayton (1857–1938), founder of Dayton Dry Goods, which became Target Corporation
- John De Laittre (1832–1912), mayor of Minneapolis
- Martha Angle Dorsett (1851–1918), lawyer
- Ida Dorsey (1866–1918), madam of prostitution houses
- William Hood Dunwoody (1841–1914), businessman, and Kate L. Dunwoody, founders of Dunwoody College of Technology
- Adolph Olson Eberhart (1870–1944), state politician and governor of Minnesota
- George G. Eitel (1858–1928), surgeon
- Franklin Ellsworth (1879–1942), U.S. Representative from Minnesota
- James T. Elwell (1855–1933), state politician and real estate developer
- Richard R. Emery (1910–1964), bishop of the Episcopal Diocese of North Dakota
- William S. Ervin (1886–1951), Attorney General of Minnesota
- William Henry Eustis (1845–1926), philanthropist and mayor of Minneapolis
- Mary Ann Feldman (1933–2019), music critic
- Ira W. Fisher (1833–1900), Wisconsin state senator
- Jacob Fjelde (1859–1896), sculptor
- Loren Fletcher (1833–1919), state legislator and U.S. Representative from Minnesota
- Steve Foley (1959–2008), drummer for The Replacements
- William Watts Folwell (1833–1929), first president of the University of Minnesota
- John H. Fraine (1861–1943), lieutenant governor of North Dakota, state politician of North Dakota
- Joseph Francis (1801–1893), inventor of maritime equipment
- Orville Freeman (1918–2003), 29th Governor of Minnesota, Former US Secretary of Agriculture
- Abram M. Fridley (1817–1892), politician and capitalist, after whom Fridley, Minnesota was named
- Nils Frykman (1842–1911), pastor and hymnwriter
- Richard P. Gale (1900–1973), U.S. Representative from Minnesota
- Frances A. Genter (1898–1992), thoroughbred racehorse owner who won America's two most important races, the 1990 Kentucky Derby and Breeders' Cup Classic
- Paul Giel (1932–2002), college football player and professional baseball player
- John Gilfillan (1835–1924), state senator and U.S. Representative from Minnesota
- Bill Goldsworthy (1944–1996), Canadian professional ice hockey player
- Godfrey G. Goodwin (1873–1933), U.S. Representative from Minnesota
- Lewis A. Grant (1828–1918), American Civil War general and Assistant U.S. Secretary of War
- James Gray (1862–1916), journalist and mayor of Minneapolis
- Frances Cranmer Greenman (1890–1981), portrait painter and columnist
- Albert R. Hall (1841–1905), state politician of Minnesota and Wisconsin
- Albert Harrington (1850–1914), grain merchant and businessman
- Spencer Harris (1900–1982), baseball player
- Hugh G. Harrison (1822–1891), banker and mayor of Minneapolis
- J. C. Haynes (1848–1913), lawyer and mayor of Minneapolis
- Barton S. Hays (1826–1914), artist
- Thomas Heggen (1918–1949), author and playwright
- Einar Hoidale (1870–1952), U.S. Representative from Minnesota
- William S. Hewett (died 1951), bridge designer
- James Kendall Hosmer (1834–1927), historian and educator
- Guy V. Howard (1879–1954), U.S. Senator from Minnesota
- Petra Fandrem Howard (1891–1971), deaf labor advocate
- Hubert H. Humphrey (1911–1978), Vice President of the United States, U.S. Senator, mayor of Minneapolis
- Muriel Humphrey (1912–1998), Second Lady of the United States, U.S. Senator
- Ethel Edgerton Hurd (1845–1929), physician and women suffragist
- Dewey Johnson (1899–1941), U.S. Representative from Minnesota
- Lewis L. Johnson (1880–1943), Wisconsin state assemblyman
- David P. Jones (1860–1927), mayor of Minneapolis
- Harry Wild Jones (1859–1935), architect
- Herschel V. Jones (1861–1928), publisher of the Minneapolis Tribune and collector
- Robert "Fish" Jones (died 1930), showman and zookeeper
- Isaac Wilson Joyce (1836–1905), Methodist bishop
- Frederick Kees (1852–1927), architect
- Mike Kelley (1875–1955), baseball player and manager
- Herbert Butros Khaury (1932–1996), also known as Tiny Tim, entertainer and musical archivist
- William S. King (1828–1900), Republican U.S. Representative for Minnesota and journalist
- Robert Koehler (1850–1917), painter and art teacher
- Les Kouba (1917–1998), wildlife artist
- Robert Bruce Langdon (1826–1895), Minnesota state senator
- John George Lennon (1858–1919), state politician
- B. Robert Lewis (1931–1979), first African American Minnesota state senator
- John Lind (1854–1930), governor of Minnesota
- Charles August Lindbergh (1859–1924), U.S. congressman and father of aviator Charles Lindbergh
- Charles M. Loring (1833–1922), businessman, co-founder of Lakewood Cemetery
- Thomas Lowry (1843–1909), lawyer and businessman
- Pug Lund (1913–1994), American football player
- John Hugh MacMillan (1928–2008), businessman
- Bobby Marshall (1880–1958), first African American to play football in Western Conference (later known as the Big 10), one of the first African American NFL players
- Ethel V. Mars (1884–1945), businesswoman and horse owner
- Forrest Mars Sr. (1904–1999), creator of M&M's candy
- Frank Clarence Mars (1882–1934), Mars, Incorporated founder
- John Martin (1820–1905), steamboat captain and businessman
- William W. McNair (1836–1885), lawyer and mayor of St. Anthony (later Minneapolis)
- Orlando C. Merriman (1827–1906), lawyer and mayor of St. Anthony and Minneapolis
- J. E. Meyers (1862–1944), mayor of Minneapolis
- Maren Michelet (1869–1932), first teacher of Norwegian in any public high school in the United States and promoter of Scandinavian culture.
- George N. Morgan (1825–1866), Union Army officer
- Dorilus Morrison (1814–1897), Minnesota state senator and mayor of Minneapolis
- Karl Mueller (1963–2005), Soul Asylum bassist
- Katherine Nash (1910–1982), artist and sculptor
- Cecil Newman (1903–1976), civic leader and businessman
- Walter Newton (1880–1941), U.S. Representative from Minnesota, secretary to President Herbert Hoover
- William I. Nolan (1874–1943), state politician, lieutenant governor of Minnesota, U.S. Representative from Minnesota
- Della Whitney Norton (1840–1937), poet, author and Christian Scientist
- Wallace G. Nye (1859–1926), 25th Mayor of Minneapolis
- Emil Oberhoffer (1867–1933), founder of the Minneapolis Symphony Orchestra
- Sven Oftedal (1844–1911), Lutheran minister
- William Olander (1950–1989), senior curator at New Museum of Contemporary Art, New York City.
- Floyd B. Olson (1891–1936), 22nd Governor of Minnesota
- Fremont D. Orff (1856–1914), architect
- Bryan Ottoson (1978–2005), American Head Charge guitarist
- Kristoffer Olsen Oustad (1857–1943), civil engineer
- Rudy Perpich (1928–1995), 34th and 36th Governor of Minnesota
- Dave Peterson (1931–1997), coach of the United States men's national ice hockey team
- Richard A. Peterson (1923–2000), American World War II flying ace and architect
- Curtis H. Pettit (1833–1914), banker and businessman
- Bradley Phillips (1818–1904), Presbyterian minister and Wisconsin state politician
- Charles Alfred Pillsbury (1842–1899), co-founder of the Pillsbury Company
- Eleanor Bellows Pillsbury (1913–1971), activist and president of Planned Parenthood
- John S. Pillsbury (1827–1901), eighth Governor of Minnesota, founder of the Pillsbury Company
- Philip W. Pillsbury (1903–1984), chairman of the Pillsbury Company
- Carl Pohlad (1915–2009), owner of the Minnesota Twins
- Eloise O'Rourke Pohlad (1917–2003), philanthropist
- Oliver S. Powell (1896–1963), banker
- Robert Pratt (1845–1908), educator and mayor of Minneapolis
- Alonzo Cooper Rand (1831–1885), mayor of Minneapolis
- Kenneth Rand (1891–1918), poet and soldier
- William Bell Riley (1861–1947), Baptist pastor
- Andrew Bonney Robbins (1845–1910), state politician and namesake of Robbinsdale, Minnesota
- Emma Roberts (1859–1948), artist and educator
- Thomas Sadler Roberts (1858–1946), physician and ornithologist
- Charles R. Robertson (1889–1951), U.S. Representative from North Dakota
- Thomas Robinson (1837–1915), U.S. Navy sailor and Medal of Honor recipient
- Gladys Roy (1896–1927), wing walker, barnstormer and actress
- Martin Olav Sabo (1938–2016), state politician and U.S. Representative from Minnesota
- James Sample (1910–1995), conductor of many orchestras including the Oregon Symphony
- Sibyl Sanderson (1864–1903). famous American operatic soprano during the Parisian Belle Époque.
- Thomas D. Schall (1878–1935), U.S. Representative and U.S. Senator from Minnesota
- William Schmidt (1845–1905), U.S. Army recipient of the Medal of Honor
- George M. Scott (1922–2006), MN Supreme Court Justice, Hennepin County Attorney, candidate for MN Governor
- David A. Secombe (1827–1892), state politician and mayor of St. Anthony (later Minneapolis)
- Charles Sumner Sedgwick (1856–1922), architect
- Milan H. Sessions (1821–1898), Union officer and state politician in Nebraska and Wisconsin
- Dick Siebert (1912–1978), baseball player
- Clifford D. Simak (1904–1988), American science fiction writer
- H. P. Skoglund (1903–1977), founding owner of the Minnesota Vikings
- John Day Smith (1845–1933), Minnesota state politician
- Lena Olive Smith (1885–1966), first black female lawyer
- Samuel Snider (1845–1928), state legislator and U.S. Representative from Minnesota
- John Pillsbury Snyder (1888–1959), RMS Titanic survivor, and grandson of John S. Pillsbury
- Clifford C. Sommer (1908–1993), businessman and state politician
- Ima Winchell Stacy (1867–1923), educator
- Carl Strandlund (1899–1974), inventor and entrepreneur
- W. R. Sweatt (1866–1937), industrialist and businessman
- John Elliott Tappan (1870–1957), lawyer and businessman
- Wilbur N. Taylor (1846–1903), U.S. Army Medal of Honor recipient during the Indian Wars
- Gloria Tew (1923–2022), sculptor
- Tiny Tim (1932–1996), musician
- Charles T. Trowbridge (1835–1907), Union officer and New York state politician
- Hiram Truesdale (1860–1897), Arizona Territorial Supreme Court justice
- Swan Turnblad (1860–1933), newspaper publisher
- Clara Ueland (1860–1927), activist and women suffragist
- Horatio P. Van Cleve (1809–1891), Union Army general
- Harriet G. Walker (1841–1917), president of Northwestern Hospital, now part of Allina Hospitals & Clinics
- T. B. Walker (1840–1928), lumberman and art collector, founder of Walker Art Center
- William D. Washburn (1831–1912), U.S. Representative and U.S. Senator from Minnesota
- William Drew Washburn Jr. (1863–1929), Minnesota state representative
- Henry T. Welles (1821–1898), Connecticut politician and mayor of St. Anthony, Minnesota
- Paul Wellstone (1944–2002), US senator for Minnesota
- Sheila Wellstone (1944–2002), advisor to husband U.S. Senator Paul Wellstone
- Eric Wickman (1887–1954), founder of Greyhound Lines
- John J. Wild (1914–2009), physician known for using ultrasound
- Henry L. Williams (1869–1931), college football player and coach
- Nelson Williams (1825–1899), Wisconsin state politician
- Eugene M. Wilson (1833–1890), U.S. Representative from Minnesota and mayor of Minneapolis
- Newton Horace Winchell (1839–1914), geologist
- Theodore Wirth (1863–1949), landscape architect
- Lyle Wright, (1898–1963) businessman, events promoter, United States Hockey Hall of Fame inductee
- Oscar Youngdahl (1893–1946), U.S. Representative from Minnesota

== See also ==
- List of burial places of presidents and vice presidents of the United States
