= Philip W. Pillsbury =

American businessman (1903–1984)

Philip Winston Pillsbury
- Born: April 16, 1903; Minneapolis, Minnesota, U.S.
- Died: June 14, 1984 (aged 81)
- Resting place: Lakewood Cemetery
- Education: Hotchkiss School (1920); Yale University (1924)
- Spouse: Eleanor Bellows Pillsbury (m. 1934; died 1971)
- Children: 2
- Parent: Charles S. Pillsbury
- Relatives: Charles Alfred Pillsbury (grandfather)

Philip Winston Pillsbury (April 16, 1903 – June 14, 1984) was chairman emeritus of the Pillsbury Company and a grandson of the cofounder, Charles Alfred Pillsbury.

== Early life ==
Pillsbury was born in Minneapolis, Minnesota. His father, Charles S. Pillsbury, was a long-time company director. He graduated from The Hotchkiss School in 1920, and was a member of the Yale College Class of 1924. He was a starting guard on the undefeated and tie-free 1923 football team, an All-American water polo athlete, and a tenor for the Yale Glee Club. Pillsbury died from cancer at Abbott-Northwestern Hospital in Minneapolis.

== Career ==
Pillsbury was elected to the board of directors in 1928; in 1940, he became president, and maintained that post after election to the chairmanship of the board in 1951.

Pillsbury started as a laborer at the company. He was a master miller before accepting promotion to sales and management positions. Pillsbury was said to be one of the few milling executives to have a real knowledge of flour milling.

== Personal life ==
Pillsbury married Eleanor Bellows Pillsbury in 1934. They had two children.

Pillsbury was buried in Lakewood Cemetery.
