= Frances Cranmer Greenman =

American painter (1890–1981)

- Born: Frances Willard Cranmer; June 28, 1890; Aberdeen, South Dakota, U.S.
- Died: May 24, 1981 (aged 90); Medina, Minnesota, U.S.
- Resting place: Lakewood Cemetery
- Style: Painting
- Movement: Modernism

Frances Cranmer Greenman (June 28, 1890 – May 24, 1981) was an American portrait painter, critic and columnist.

== Early life and education ==
Frances Willard Cranmer was born on June 28, 1890, in a log cabin in Aberdeen, South Dakota. Her parents were Hon. Simeon Harris Cranmer, and the suffragist, Emma Amelia Cranmer. She was named for suffragist Frances Willard. At 15, she attended the Wisconsin Academy of Art Madison Wisconsin. At 16, she attended the Corcoran School of Art in Washington, D.C. She studied at Art Student League New York City with William Merritt Chase; at Robert Henri school in New York City; at Boston Museum Art School with Frank Benson; and at Academie de La Grand Chaumierein Paris in 1911. She won a gold medal from Corcoran in 1908.

== Career ==
She moved to Minneapolis in the 1910s. She had her first major exhibition in 1913 at the Handicraft Guild. She went back to New York for several years before settling at the Hampshire Arms Hotel. Her permanent studio was on the fifth floor of the building and was painted completely black for her portraiture.

She was awarded a gold medal at the 1915 Minnesota State Fair for a group of three portraits.

Greenman was an established society painter in Minneapolis by the early 1920s and made portraits for Hollywood stars, politicians and socialites.

Her 1921 exhibition at the Bradstreet Gallery in Minneapolis was described in American Art News as "alternately gay and serious, prismatic and tonal." Greenman was awarded first prize in painting at the seventh and eighth annual exhibitions of Twin City Artists. Her portrait Jane won the prize for the eighth exhibition in 1922.

Greenman was replaced as a judge during the 1925 Iowa State Fair's Art Salon due to her modernist inclinations. Painter and exhibit head Charles Atherton Cumming postponed the art judging, first claiming that Greenman was ill. Greenman herself disputed this and Cumming went on to describe how she had been "converted to what she calls 'modern' art since I last viewed her exhibit." He explained that Iowa artists were "followers of 'white man's art'" and Greenman was replaced by one J. Laurie Wallace.

Following the Wall Street crash of 1929, Greenman left New York and supported her family by painting portraits for wealthy clients.

Greenman taught at the Minneapolis School of Art from 1941 to 1943. She also taught at the Art Institute of Chicago.

Her style was bold and informed by modernism. Her painting Pink Lotus depicted one David Painter and in a severe, flattened, and unflattering manner. While her earlier portraits were more adventurous, they became more conservative and conventional over time. Her 1922 work A Moment's Rest for Mrs. Hoscovics and her portraits of Polish immigrants in Wisconsin show that Greenman wanted to use her art to explore social issues.

Greenman painted portraits of many famous people, including conductor Emil Oberhoffer, Dolores del Río, and Mary Pickford. She painted the official governor's portrait of Karl Rolvaag. It is hung in the Minnesota State Capitol.

She wrote her autobiography, Higher Than the Sky in 1954. She also worked for the Minneapolis Sunday Tribune as a critic, writing the art column "Frances Greenman Says".

Museums that hold Frances Cranmer Greenman works:

Dacotah Prairie Museum Aberdeen SD, South Dakota Art Museum Brookings SD, Neville Public Museum Greenbay Wisconsin, Hennepin History Museum Minneapolis MN, Minneapolis Art Institute Minneapolis MN, Minnesota History Center St Paul MN, Walker Art Center Minneapolis MN, Minnesota Museum of American Art St Paul MN.

== Death ==
Greenman died in Medina, Minnesota, on May 24, 1981. She was buried in Lakewood Cemetery.
