= Gloria Tew =

American sculptor (1923–2022)

Gloria June Tew (May 10, 1923 – January 31, 2022) was an American abstract sculptor known for her work in marble, bronze and steel. Tew's sculptures are found in institutions, museums, churches and private collections including, King Carl XVI Gustaf and Queen Silvia of Sweden. She resided in Minneapolis.

== Early life and education ==
Tew was born in Duluth, Minnesota, on May 10, 1923. She attended Minneapolis College of Art and Design where she studied with Alice Tweton. As an adult, Tew went back to Gustavus Adolphus College in St. Peter, Minnesota, where she was encouraged by her teacher Paul Granlund (1925–2003) to pursue sculpting. Tew attributes most of her influences to the late Architect Ralph Rapson (1914–2008), who also designed the artist's home and was often found in Tew's studio and the late Modernist Charles Biederman (1906–2004).

== Career ==
Tew began her career as a freelance fashion illustrator in Minneapolis at the age of 15. The drastic change in her artistic direction was brought on by the death of her only child in 1969. Shortly after the tragedy, a friend introduced Tew to Sculptor Paul Granlund, who was the resident sculptor at Gustavus at that time and ultimately became Tews's mentor and friend.

== Personal life and death ==
Tew died in Crystal, Minnesota, on January 31, 2022, at the age of 98. She was buried at Lakewood Cemetery.

== Honors ==
- President's National League of Cities Award. Washington, D.C. 2003
- Governor Rudy Perpich Memorial—15 foot monument sculpture, Lake Wood Cemetery, Minneapolis 1996
- "Caring" Competition Winner. Duluth, Minnesota and Växjö, Sweden August 1993
  - An eight-foot bronze sculpture was placed in the town square of Växjö, Sweden as a part of a sister competition in Duluth, Minnesota 1993.
- "Caring" a Cararra marble sculpture, April, 1988
  - Selected for presentation to Sweden's King Carl XVI Gustaf and Queen Silvia during the Royal Visit to Minneapolis, as part of New Sweden '88 Minneapolis, Minnesota April 1988.
- "Trees" stainless steel sculpture 1980.
  - Finalist in the University of Minnesota's 75th Anniversary Alumni Sculpture Competition 1980
- Women of Achievement Award West Suburban Chamber of Commerce nominee for Minneapolis, Minnesota 1980
- "Reflections" a 15-foot outdoor stainless steel sculptor. 1987.
  - Winner of Sculpture Competition for the Minnetonka Civic Center, Minnetonka, Minnesota 1987
- "Roll of Honor", stainless steel sculpture 1986
  - Finalist in Veterans Administration Medical Center Competition, Minneapolis, Minnesota 1986

== Exhibitions ==
- American Swedish institute, Monuments and Celebrations, the work of Gloria Tew, a retrospective. 2005
- "Caring Hands", selected for Generose Building, St. Mary's Hospital (Mayo), Rochester, Minnesota
- International Care Givers Conference, Mayo Clinic, Rochester, Minnesota 1996
- Granlund Influence Invitational 1985 Callaway Galleries 1984
- Lutheran Brotherhood Invitational 1983
- United Methodist Invitational 1982
- The American Swedish institute 1981
- Governor's Mansion 1981
- Gustavus Adolphus College 1973

== Public collections ==
- University of Minnesota School of Nursing, Minneapolis, Minnesota 2009.
- Gustavus Adolphus, St. Peter, Minnesota 2006
- Ridgeway International, Hopkins, Minnesota 2006
- Rochester Rowing Club, Rochester, Minnesota 2004.
- Mayo Clinic, Gonda Building, Rochester, Minnesota 2005.
- Delta Dental, Breast Cancer Race, Claremorris, Ireland 2001.
- Mount Olivet Lutheran Church Retreat Center installation, Minneapolis, Minnesota 2001.
- Basilica of St. Mary, Minneapolis, Minnesota 2000.
- St. John the Baptist Catholic Church, New Brighton, Minnesota 2000.
- Camp Heartland for Children with AIDS, Willow River, Minnesota 1999.
- Wayzata Community Church, Wayzata, Minnesota 1998.
- Archdiocese, St. Paul, Minnesota 1998.
- Hamline University, St. Paul, Minnesota 1997.
- Governor's Monument, St. Paul, Minnesota 1996.
- Lakewood Cemetery, Minneapolis, Minnesota date unknown.
- Courage Center, Stillwater, Minnesota 1996.
- University of St. Thomas chapel, St. Paul, Minnesota 1996.
- Minnehaha Communion Lutheran Church, Minneapolis, Minnesota 1994.
- Saint Mary's Hospital-Mayo Clinic, Rochester, Minnesota 1994.
- Pentair International, St. Paul, Minnesota 1994.
- Town Square, Växjö, Kronoberg, Sweden 1993.
- Dale Carnegie Office Building, Minneapolis, Minnesota 1991.
- Odaka Building, Tokyo, Japan 1990.
- Unisys Corporation, Minneapolis, Minnesota 1990.
- Hagan Systems, Eden Prairie, Minnesota 1990.
- Grigsby Gallery, Atlanta, Georgia 1989.
- Tucson Museum of Art, Tucson, Arizona 1988
- Minnetonka Civic Center, Minnetonka, Minnesota 1987.
- Burnet Realty, Minneapolis, Minnesota 1985.
- Kraus-Anderson Companies, Minneapolis, Minnesota (Date not given).
- Trammell Crow Company, Minneapolis, Minnesota (Date not given).
- M.S.P.E. Office Building, St. Paul, Minnesota 1978.
- Marquette National Bank, Minneapolis, Minnesota 1975.
- IDS Center Health One, Minneapolis, Minnesota 1975.
