= Joseph Francis =

American boat builder and inventor

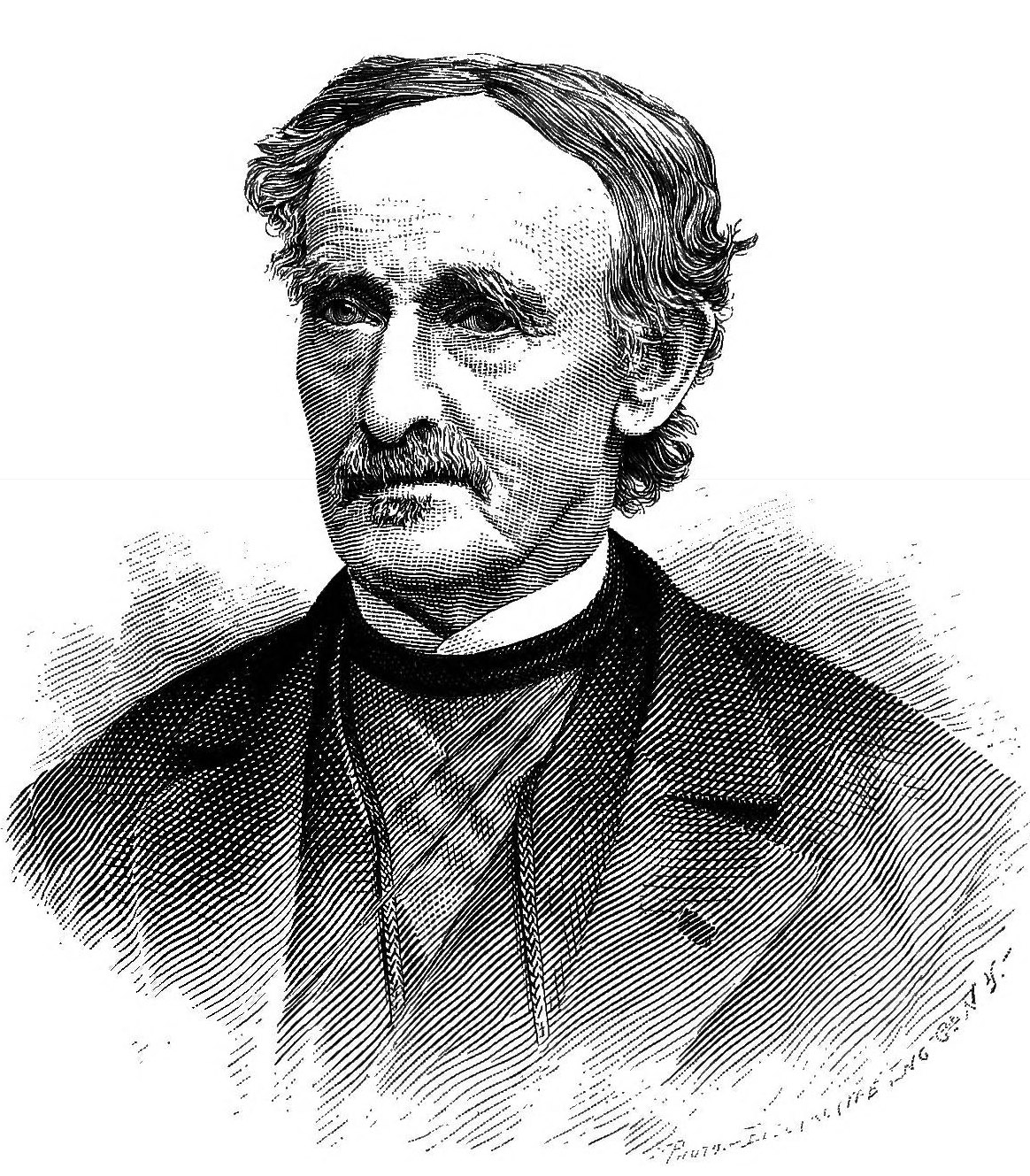
- Joseph Francis
- Born: March 12, 1801; Boston, Massachusetts, U.S.
- Died: May 10, 1893 (aged 92); Otsego Lake, New York, U.S.
- Resting place: Lakewood Cemetery
- Occupation: Inventor

Joseph Francis (March 12, 1801 – May 10, 1893) was a 19th-century American inventor who devoted his life to improving maritime equipment, especially life-saving tools. His most famous invention, the metallic life-car, rescued thousands of stranded passengers and crew from shipwrecks near the shore.

Francis was born in Boston, Massachusetts, and started building boats early in life. He won his first prize in a public competition at age eighteen. As an adult, he worked for the U.S. Government, building life boats for war ships. He was the first person to use iron in the construction of life boats. The government declined to fund his metal boats, so he began his own business on the Jersey Shore, near Long Branch. His boats, rafts, life-car, and other watercraft became popular in Europe before eventually being adopted in the United States as well. Francis died at age 92 while summering at Otsego Lake in New York. He was buried in Lakewood Cemetery.

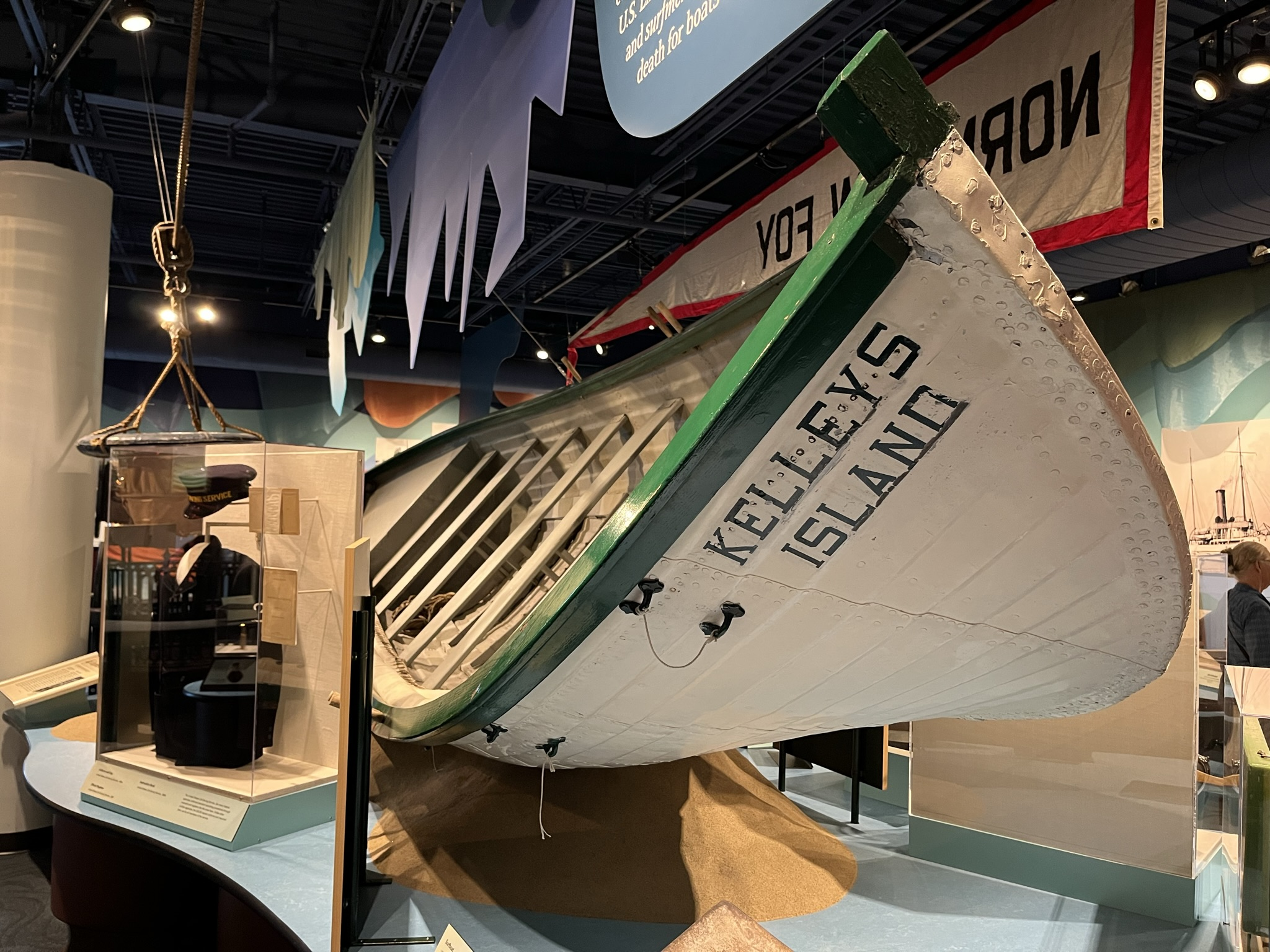
A Joseph Francis designed surfboat on display at the National Museum of the Great Lakes.

The first life-car ever used, which rescued 200 of 201 people from the Scottish brig Ayrshire wreck in 1850, is on display at the Smithsonian National Museum of American History. Also on display are some of Francis' numerous awards that he received in gratitude for his inventions. These include the Congressional Gold Medal, which was designed by the famous American sculptor Augustus Saint-Gaudens and was given to him by President Benjamin Harrison on August 27, 1888, as well as a diamond-encrusted snuff box from Emperor Napoleon III of France.

Although Francis was considered one of the most well-known heroes of the 19th century, his popularity waned with the decrease in maritime accidents and he is virtually unknown today.
