= Albert Harrington (merchant) =

American businessman

- Born: April 19, 1850; Homer, New York, U.S.
- Died: July 5, 1914 (aged 64)
- Resting place: Lakewood Cemetery; Minneapolis, Minnesota, U.S.
- Education: West Point Military Academy
- Occupations: Businessman; Grain Merchant
- Spouse: Miss Laura Frick (m. 1873)
- Children: 4

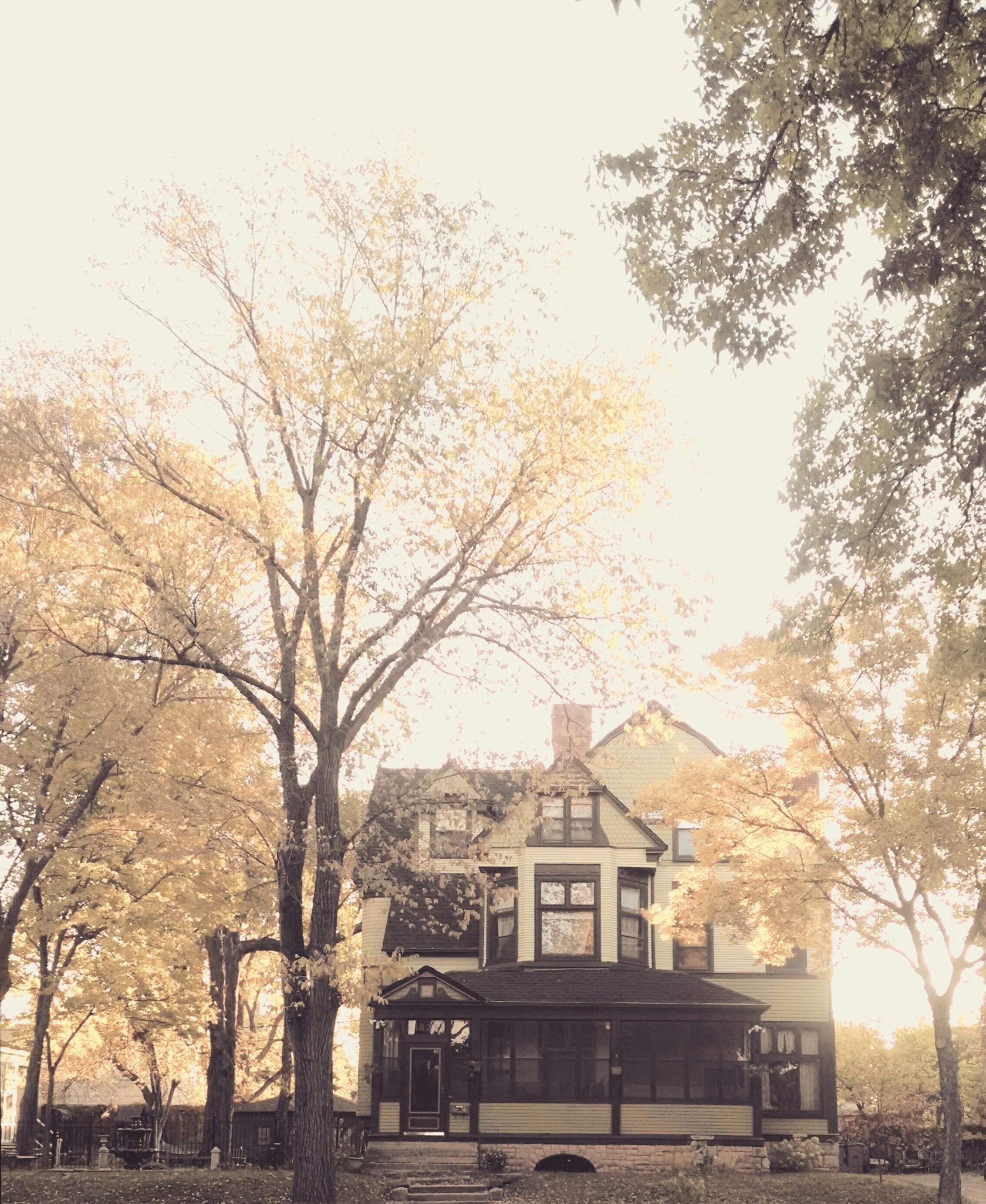
Albert Harrington grew wealthy and commissioned the impressive nine-bedroom Harrington House at 1823 Park Ave, Minneapolis, Minnesota, in 1888.

Albert Harrington (April 19, 1850 – July 5, 1914) was a grain merchant in Minnesota. He is best known as a member of the G. W. Van Dusen Company. He was a member of the Minneapolis Chamber of commerce; he built the Belt Line elevator in Superior, Wisconsin, in 1892; and he was the President of the Belt Line Elevator Company from 1892 to 1895. This was part of the 10-block “Golden Mile” on Park Avenue between 18th and 28th Streets.

== Early life ==
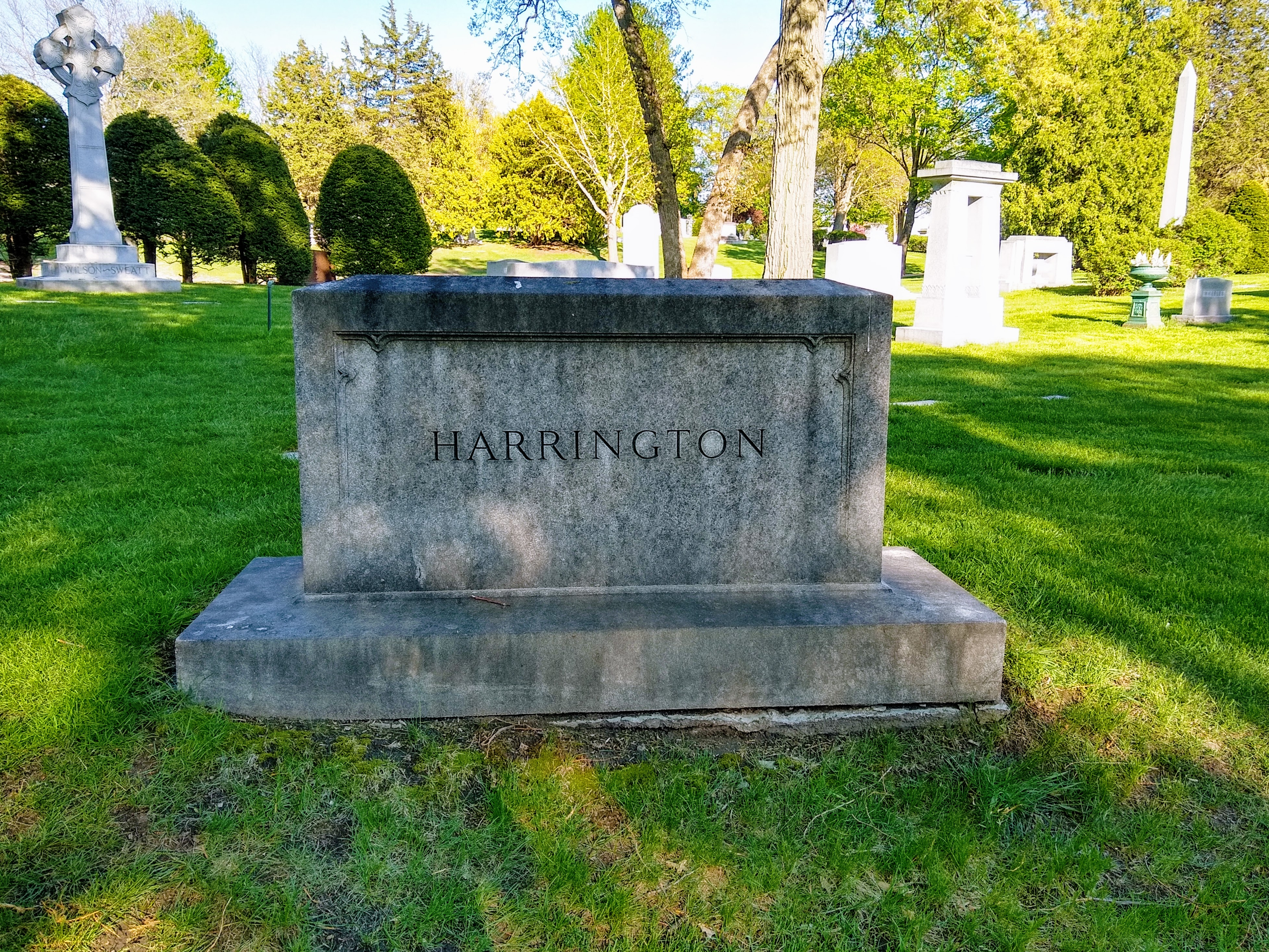

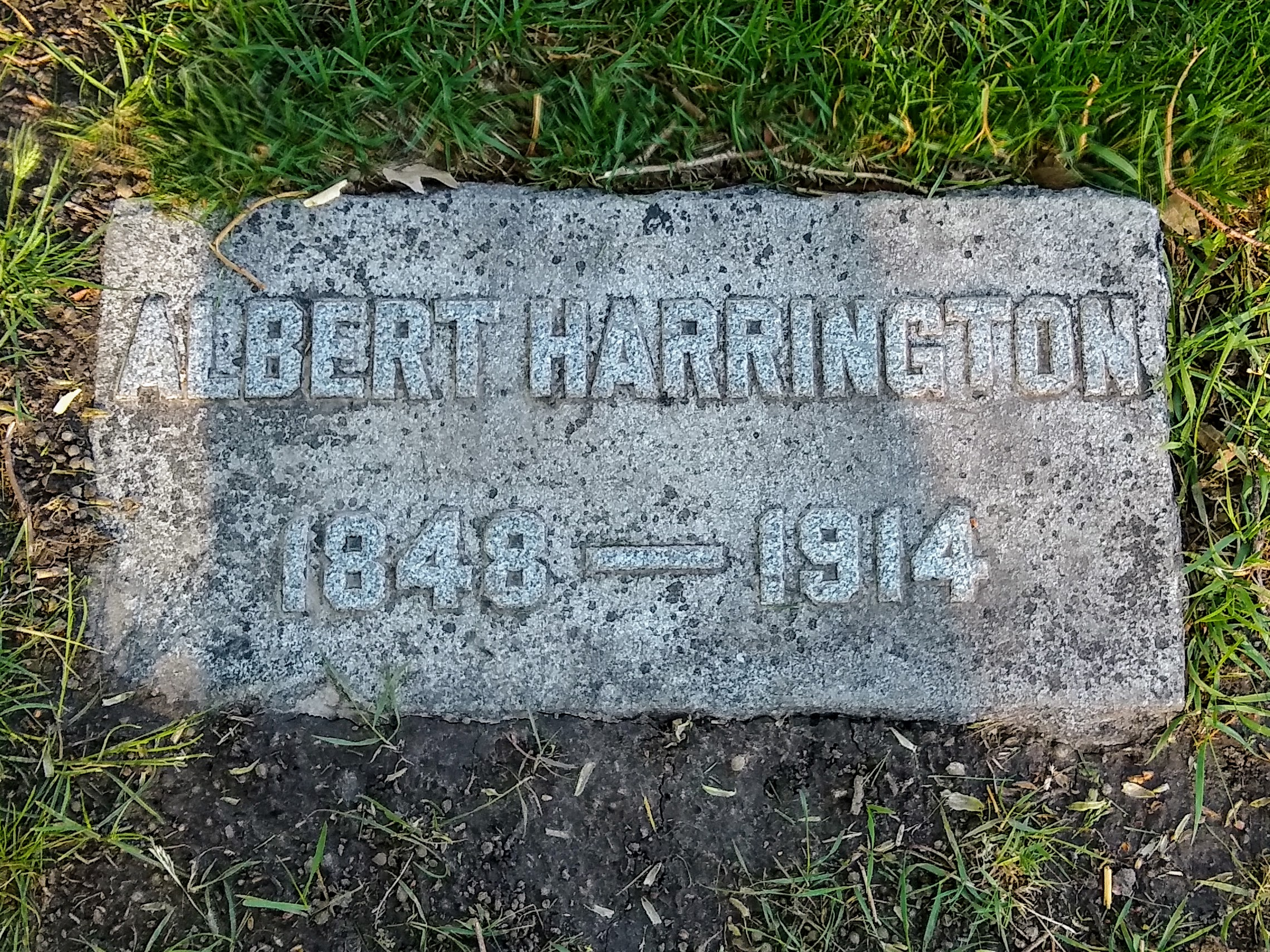

Harrington was born in Moravia, Cayuga County, New York. By the time he was four years old, his family had moved to Homer, New York, where his family opened a hardware store. In 1856, they decided to leave and move to Saratoga, Minnesota, where he graduated from high school in 1866 and went on to further schooling.

At West Point in 1887, he was appointed a cadet by William Windom. After two years, he left because of sore eyes.

== Career ==
Harrington worked for his cousin, Charles M. Harrington, at the VanDusen Harrington company, owned by Charles and George W. Van Dusen. In 1889, Van Dusen sold its country elevator and Albert Harrington retired from the firm. He moved to Minneapolis and went into business for himself. He commissioned a grand residence at 1823 Park Ave, Minneapolis, Minnesota, situated between the Swan Turnblad House, now known as the American Swedish Institute and the Harry F. Legg House

== Personal life ==
Harrington was buried in Lakewood Cemetery.
