= Truman Ward Ingersoll =

American photographer

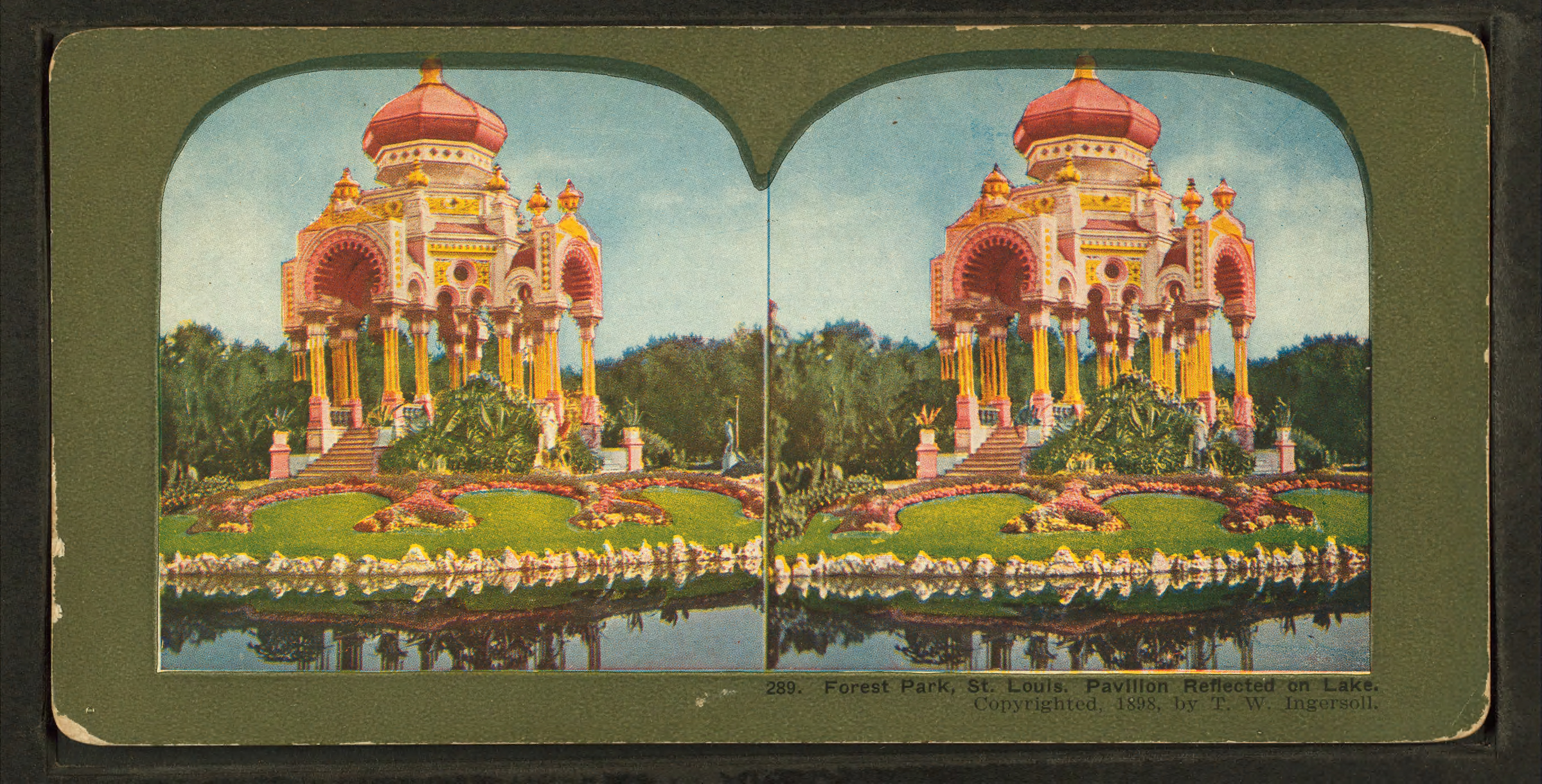
Pavilion reflected in water at Forest Park in St. Louis

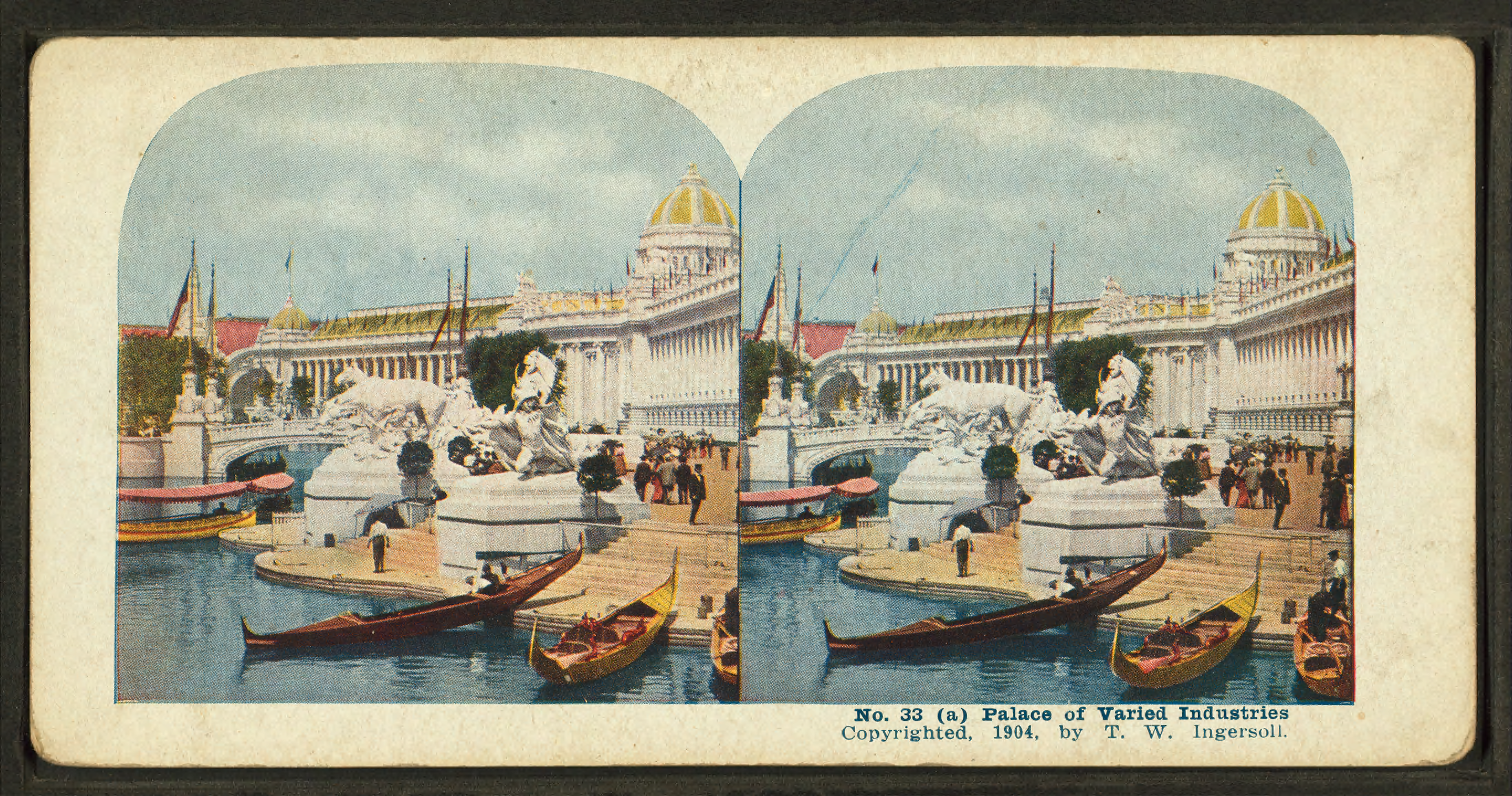
Palace of Varied Industries at 1904 World's Fair

Truman Ward Ingersoll (February 19, 1862 – June 9, 1922) was a photographer in the United States. He is known for the stereoviews he published in the U.S. and other areas. His work included many images of sights in Yellowstone National Park as well as hunting scenes and architectural features. In the early 20th century he also produced half-tone lithoviews. His company was named Ingersoll View Company.

The Met has one of his building photographs in their collection and the Getty Museum has a collection of his work.

Ingersoll was born to Daniel Wesley and Marion Ward Ingersoll in St. Paul, Minnesota.

The Library of Congress also has a collection of his work.

Ingersoll is buried at Oakland Cemetery in St. Paul.

== See also ==
- Benjamin Franklin Upton
