= Benjamin Franklin Upton =

19th century American photographer

- Born: August 3, 1818; Dixmont, Maine
- Died: December 3, 1910
- Occupation: Photographer
- Known for: Stereoscopic views of natural features and architectural sights

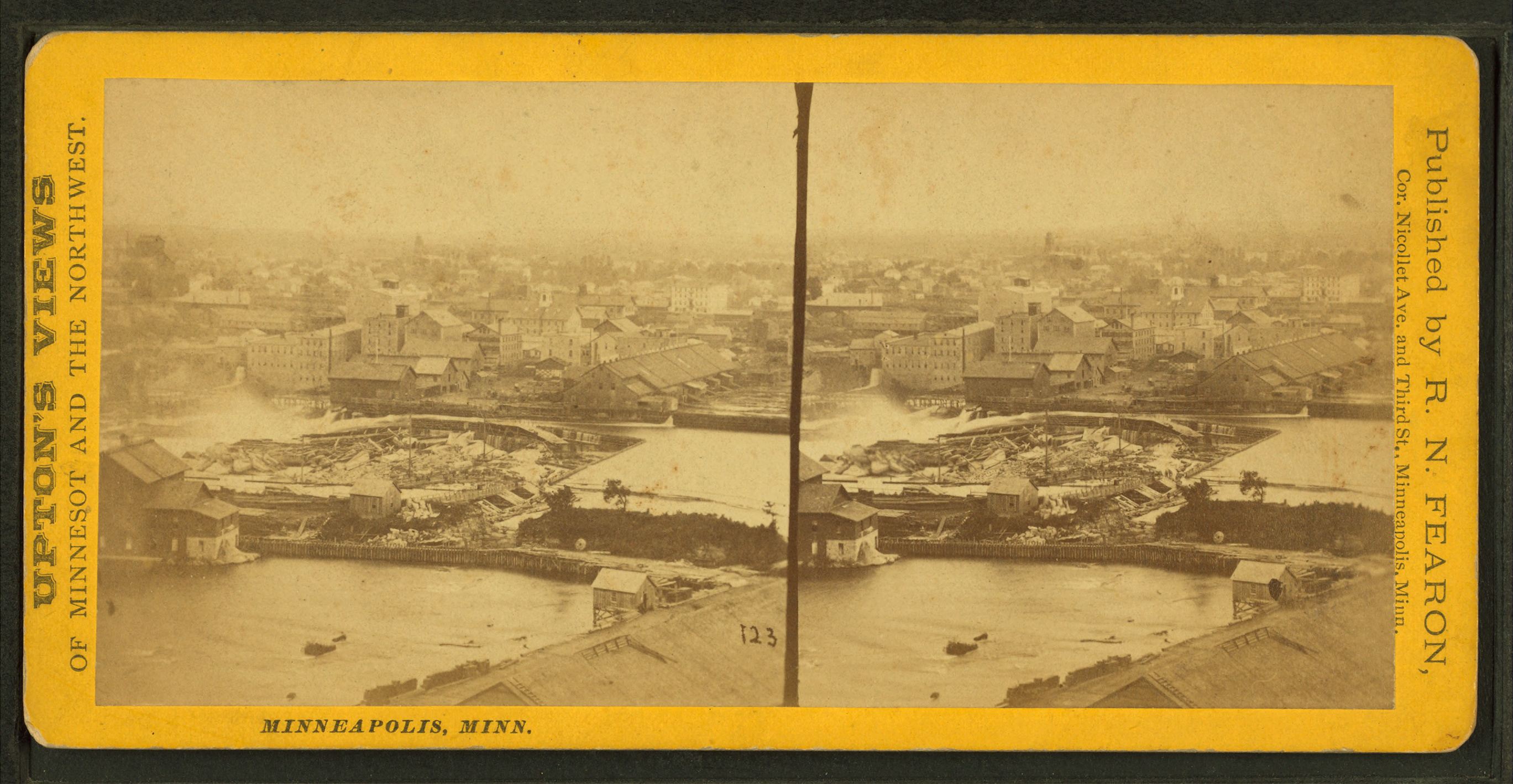
Minneapolis

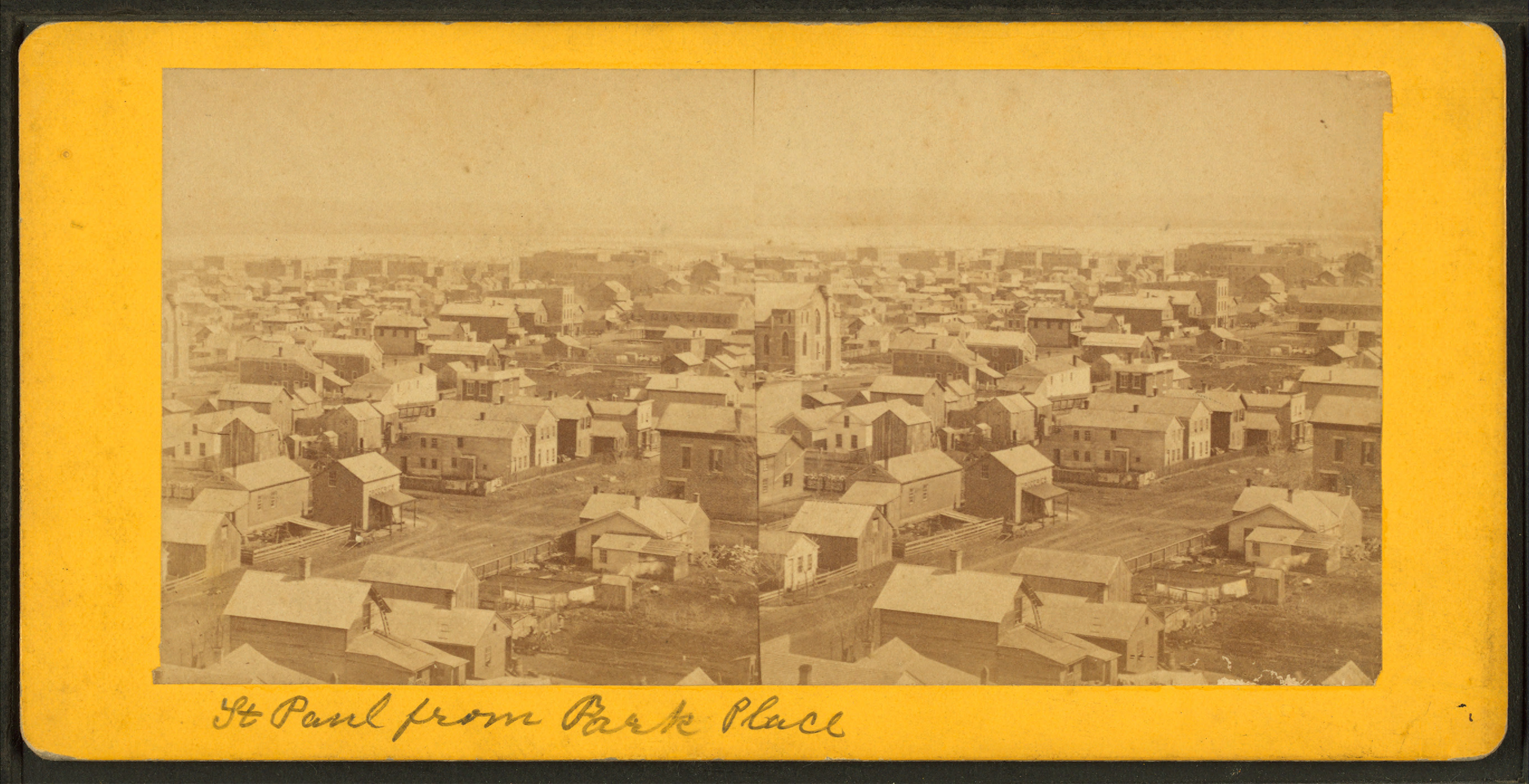
Stereoscopic photograph of St. Paul from the Park Place Hotel

Benjamin Franklin Upton (August 3, 1818 – December 3, 1910) was a photographer who produced stereoscopic views in the United States, especially of natural features, architectural sights, pineries (logging operations) and recreational endeavors around the Minneapolis, St. Anthony, and Saint Paul area and its surroundings. Some of the images were labelled "Upton's Views".

Upton was born in Dixmont, Maine. He began his photographic career working with daguerreotypes in Brunswick, and patented both a mercury bath technique and a device for polishing plates for use in the daguerreotype process.

The Minnesota Historical Society and the Library of Congress have collections of albumen prints of his work. A carte de visite of his photo of Wa-kan-o-zhan-zhan (Medicine Bottle), one of the leaders of the Dakota War of 1862, is in the collection of the National Portrait Gallery in London.

== Gallery ==
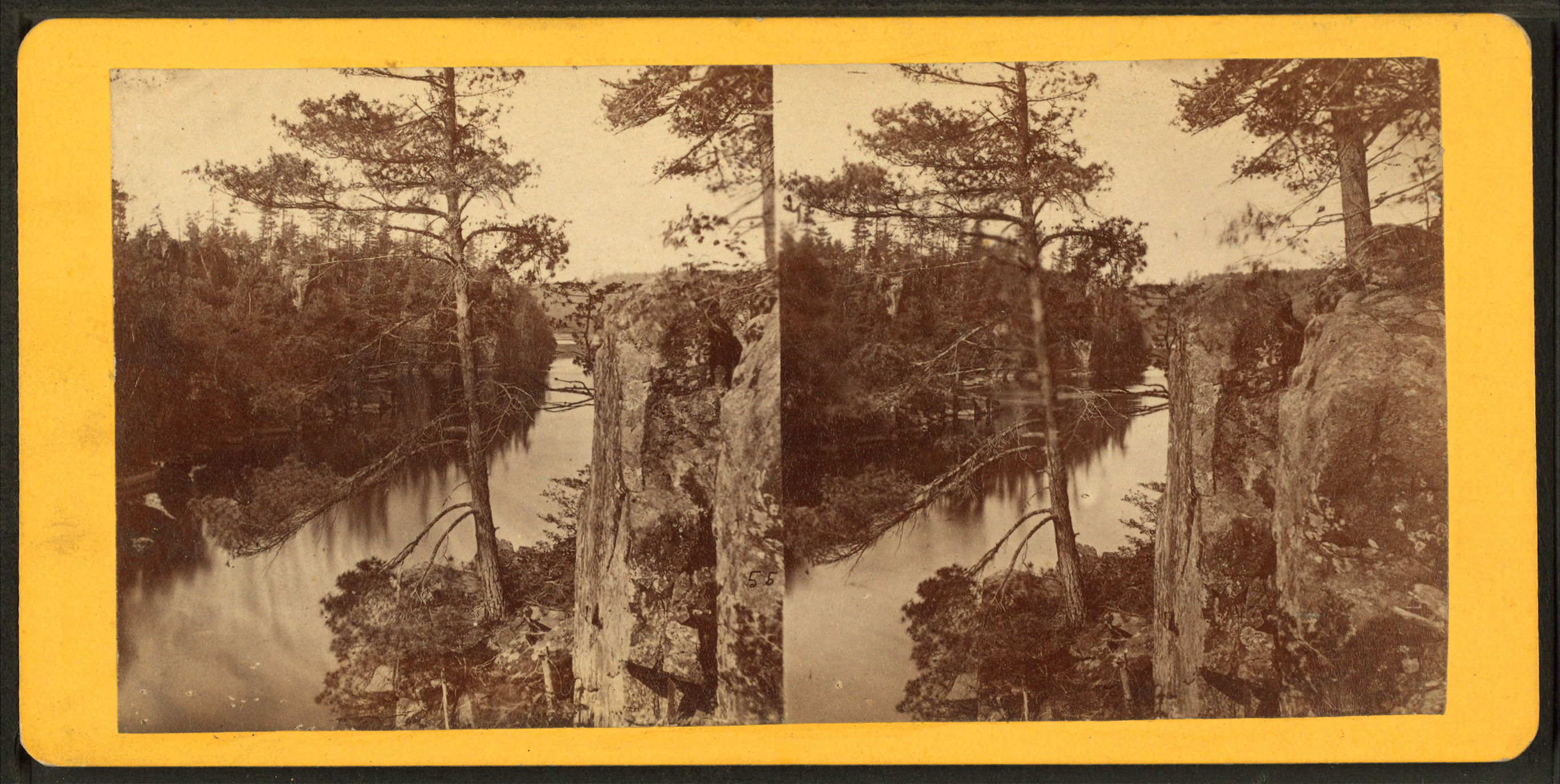
Dells of the St. Croix

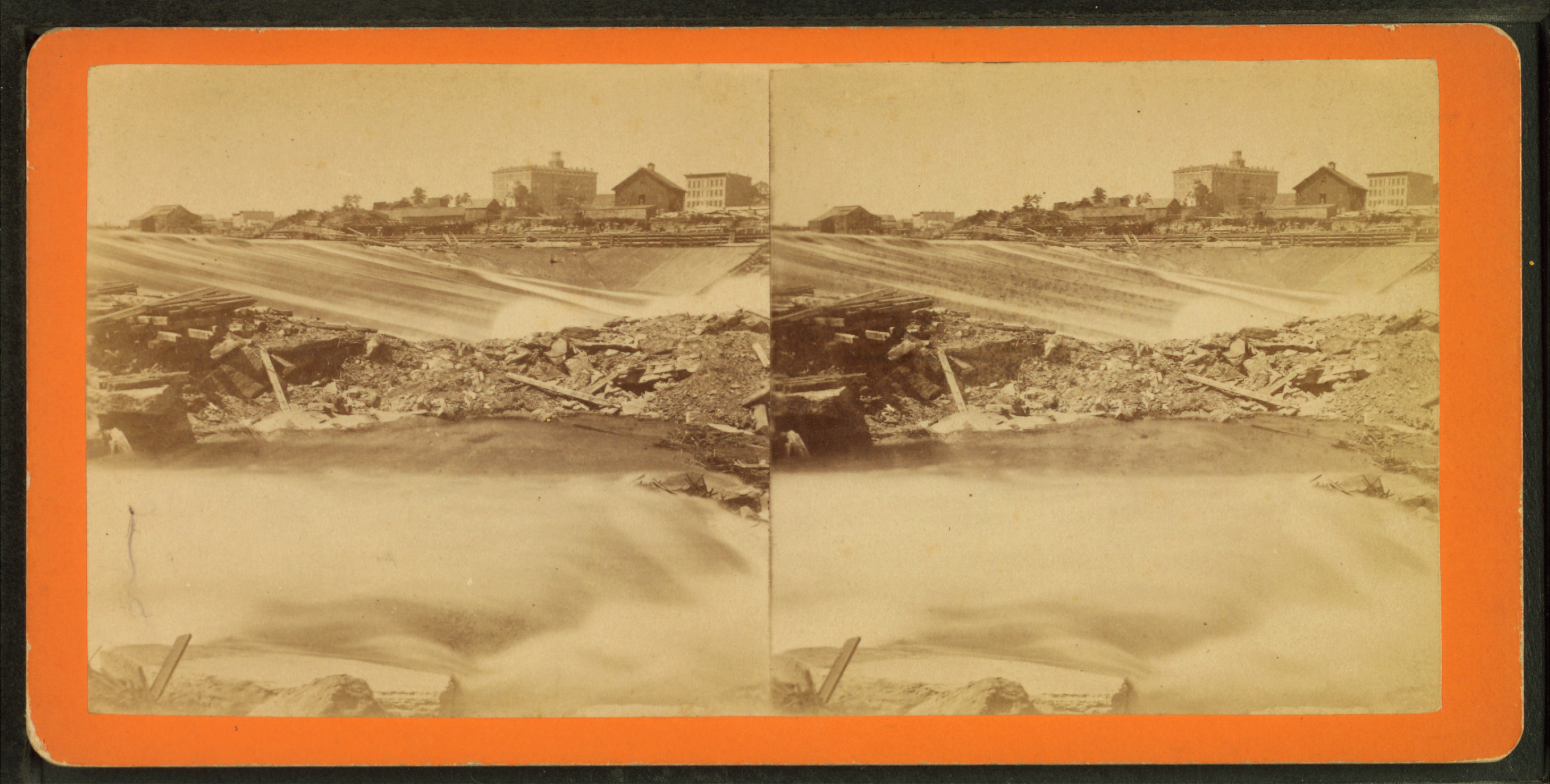
Falls of St. Anthony

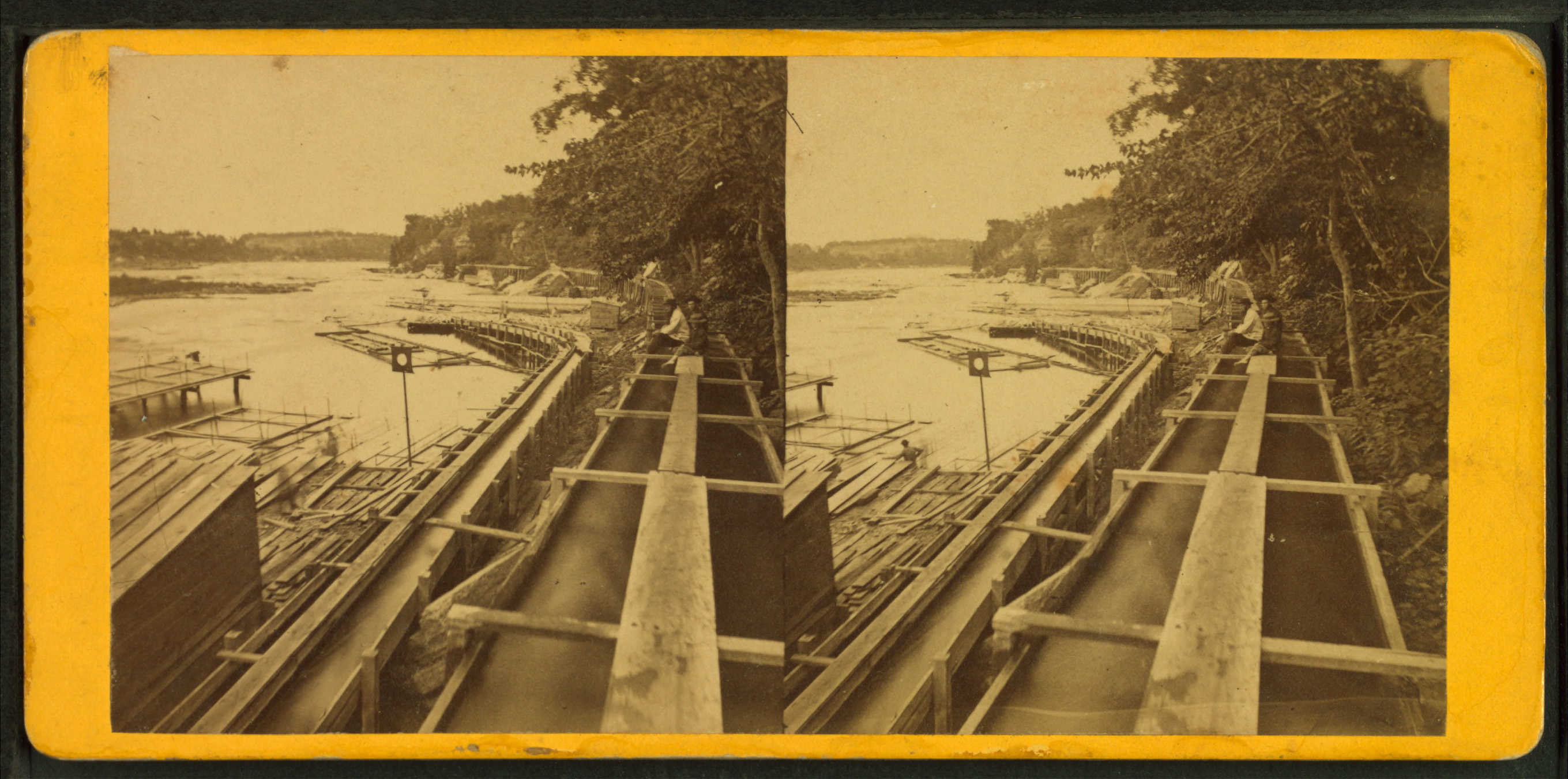
Board sluice at the Falls of St. Anthony

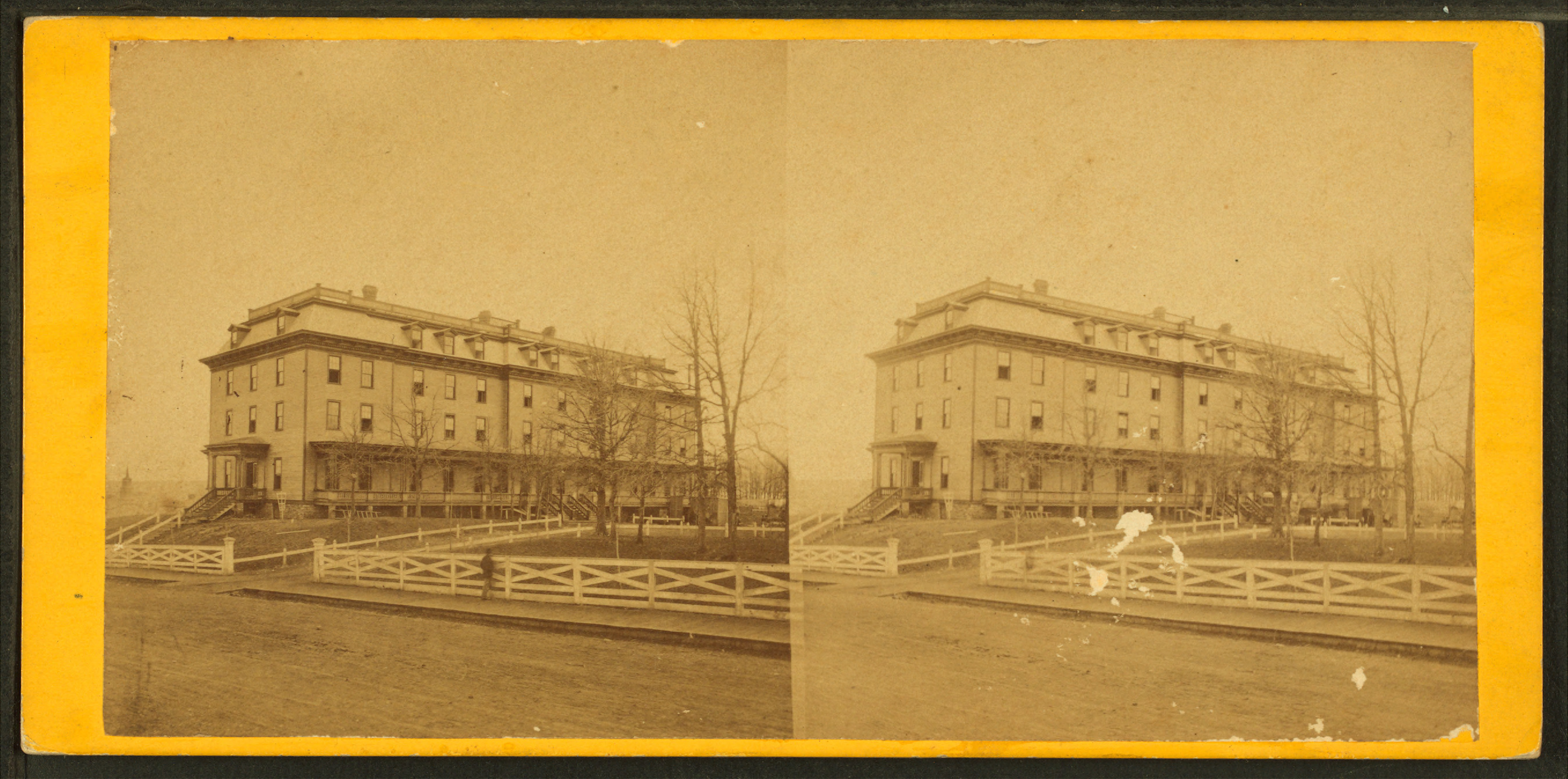
Park Place Hotel

== See also ==
- Truman Ward Ingersoll
