= Saint Anthony Falls =

Waterfall in Minneapolis, Minnesota

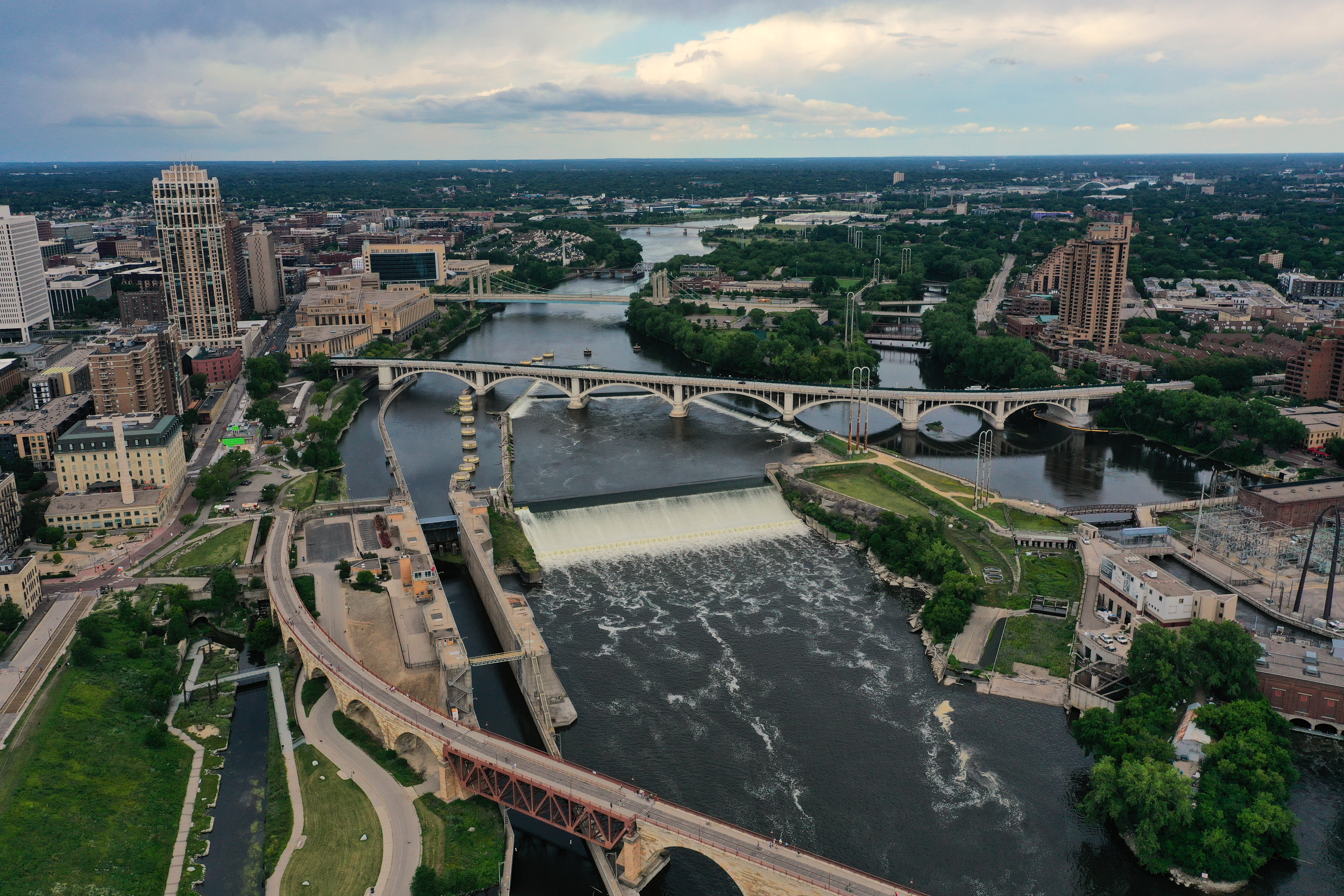
- Saint Anthony Falls with the upper lock and dam, viewed from downstream
- Interactive map of Saint Anthony Falls
- Location: Mississippi River into the Mississippi River Gorge in Minneapolis, Minnesota
- Coordinates: 44°58′54″N 93°15′31″W
- Type: Block
- Total height: 49 ft (15 m)
- Number of drops: 1
- Watercourse: Mississippi River
- Average flow rate: 13,000 cu ft/s (370 m^{3}/s)
- Saint Anthony Falls
- U.S. Historic district – Contributing property
- Location within Minnesota
- Location: Minneapolis, Minnesota
- Part of: St. Anthony Falls Historic District (ID71000438)
- Added to NRHP: March 11, 1971

Saint Anthony Falls, or the Falls of Saint Anthony (Dakota: Owámniyomni, lit. 'whirlpool'), located at the northeastern edge of downtown Minneapolis, Minnesota, was the only natural major waterfall on the Mississippi River. Throughout the mid-to-late 1800s, various dams were built atop the east and west faces of the falls to support the milling industry that spurred the growth of the city of Minneapolis. In 1880, the central face of the falls was reinforced with a sloping timber apron to stop the upstream erosion of the falls. In the 1950s, the apron was rebuilt with concrete, which makes up the most visible portion of the falls today. A series of locks were constructed in the 1950s and 1960s to extend navigation to points upstream.

The falls were renamed from their Dakota title in 1680 by Father Louis Hennepin after his patron saint, St. Anthony of Padua. The towns of St. Anthony and Minneapolis, which had developed on the east and west sides of the falls, respectively, merged in 1872 to fully use the power of the falls for milling operations. From 1880 to about 1930, Minneapolis was known as the "Flour Milling Capital of the World".

Today, the falls are defined by the spillway, the upper dam and the locks, located just downstream of the 3rd Avenue Bridge, and the Lower Lock and Dam, just upstream of the I-35W Saint Anthony Falls Bridge. These locks were built as part of the Upper Mississippi River 9-Foot Navigation Project. The area around the falls is designated the St. Anthony Falls Historic District and features a 1.8-mile (2.9 km) self-guided walking trail with signs explaining the area's past.

== History ==
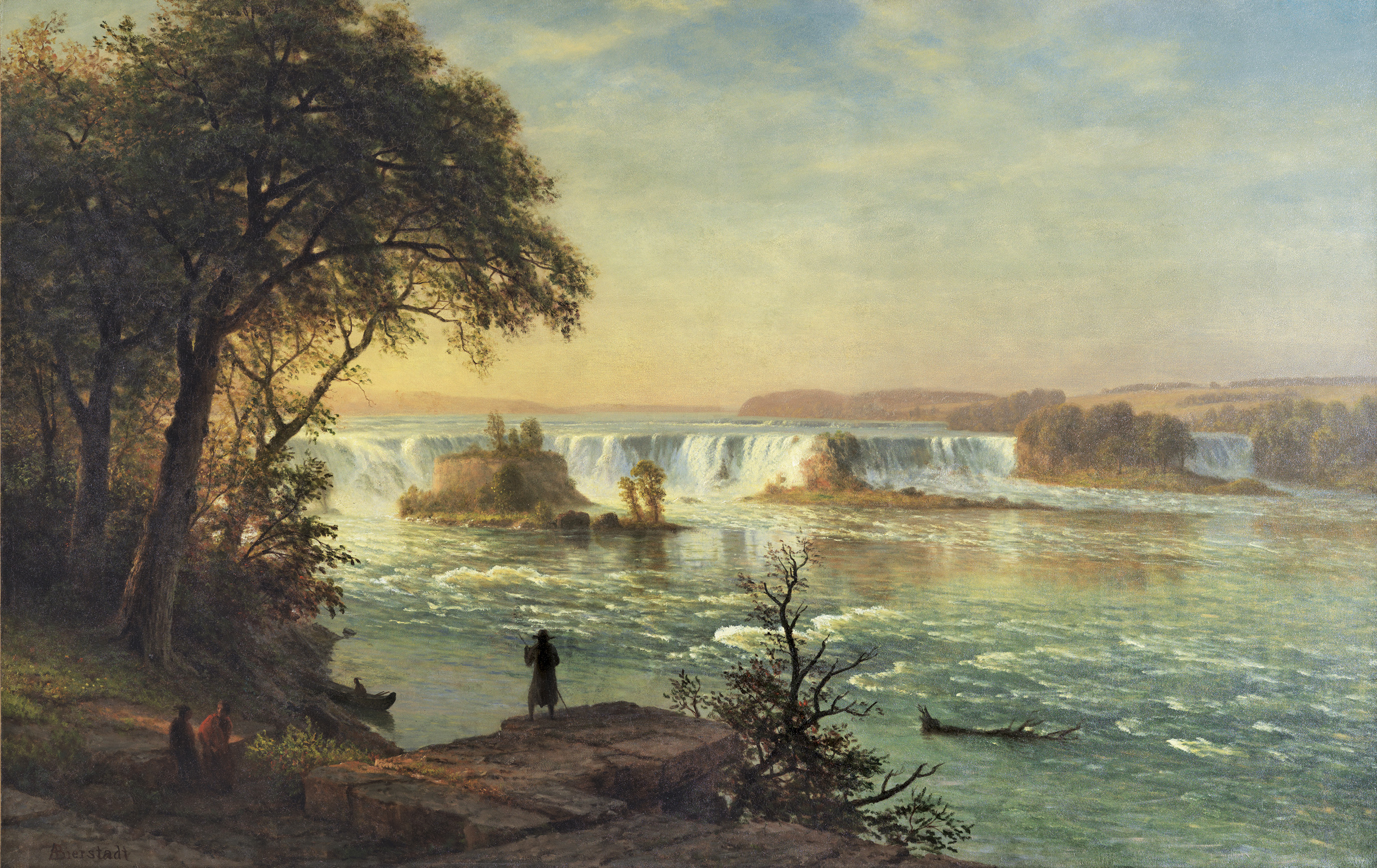
Albert Bierstadt painted The Falls of St. Anthony in 1880, creating an artist's impression of how the falls looked prior to industrialization.

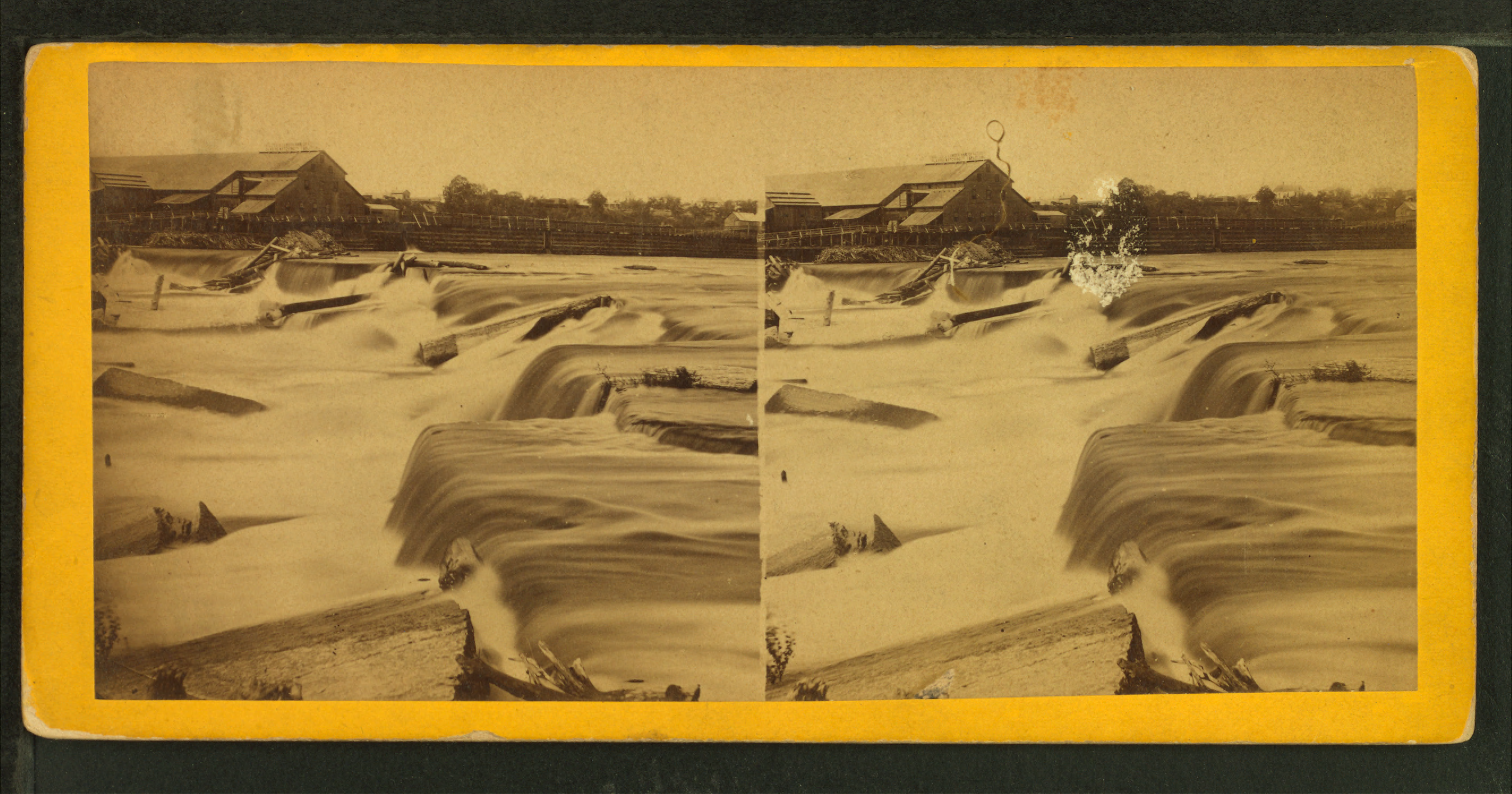
Stereoscopic photograph of the falls by Benjamin Franklin Upton

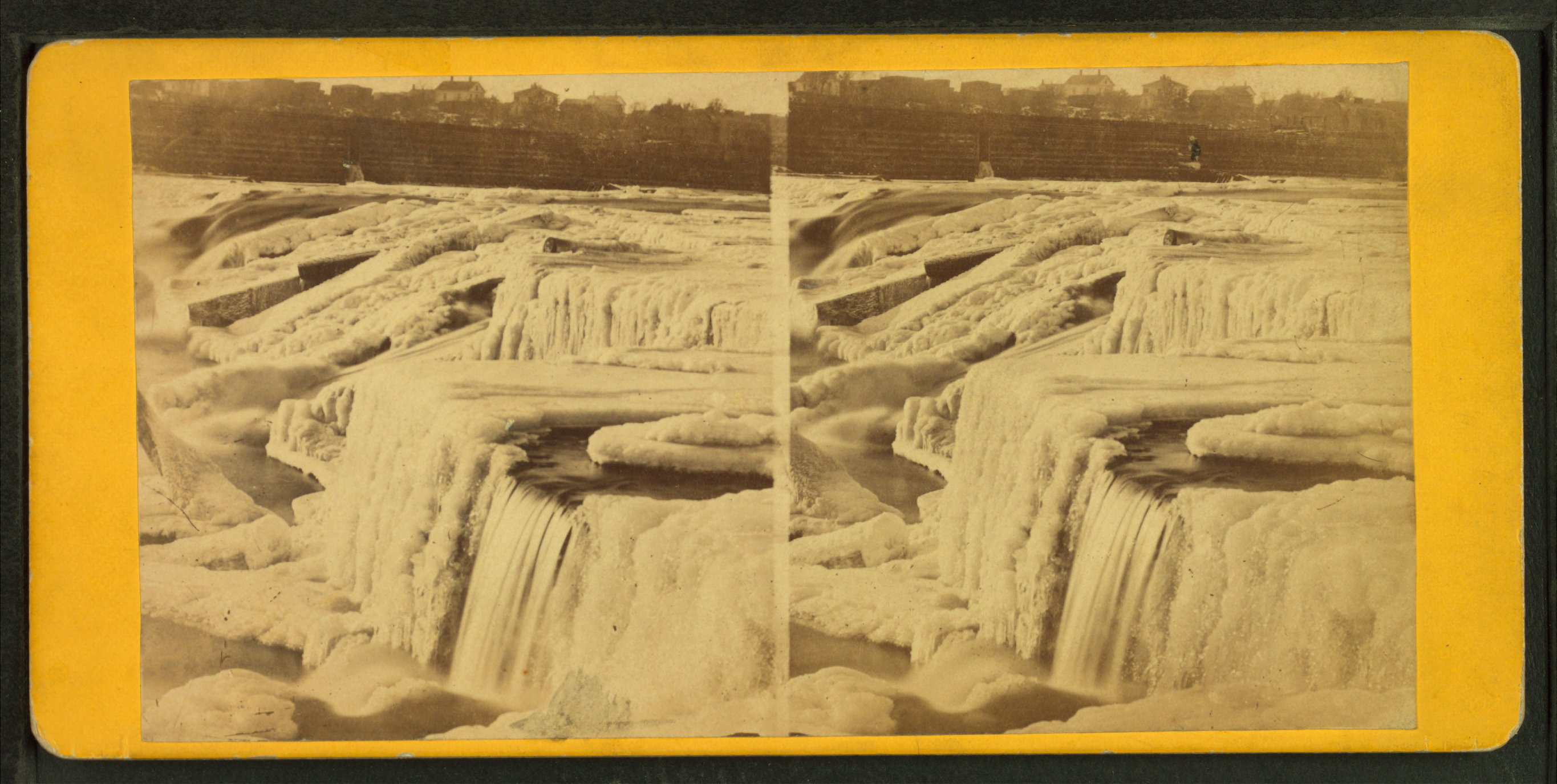

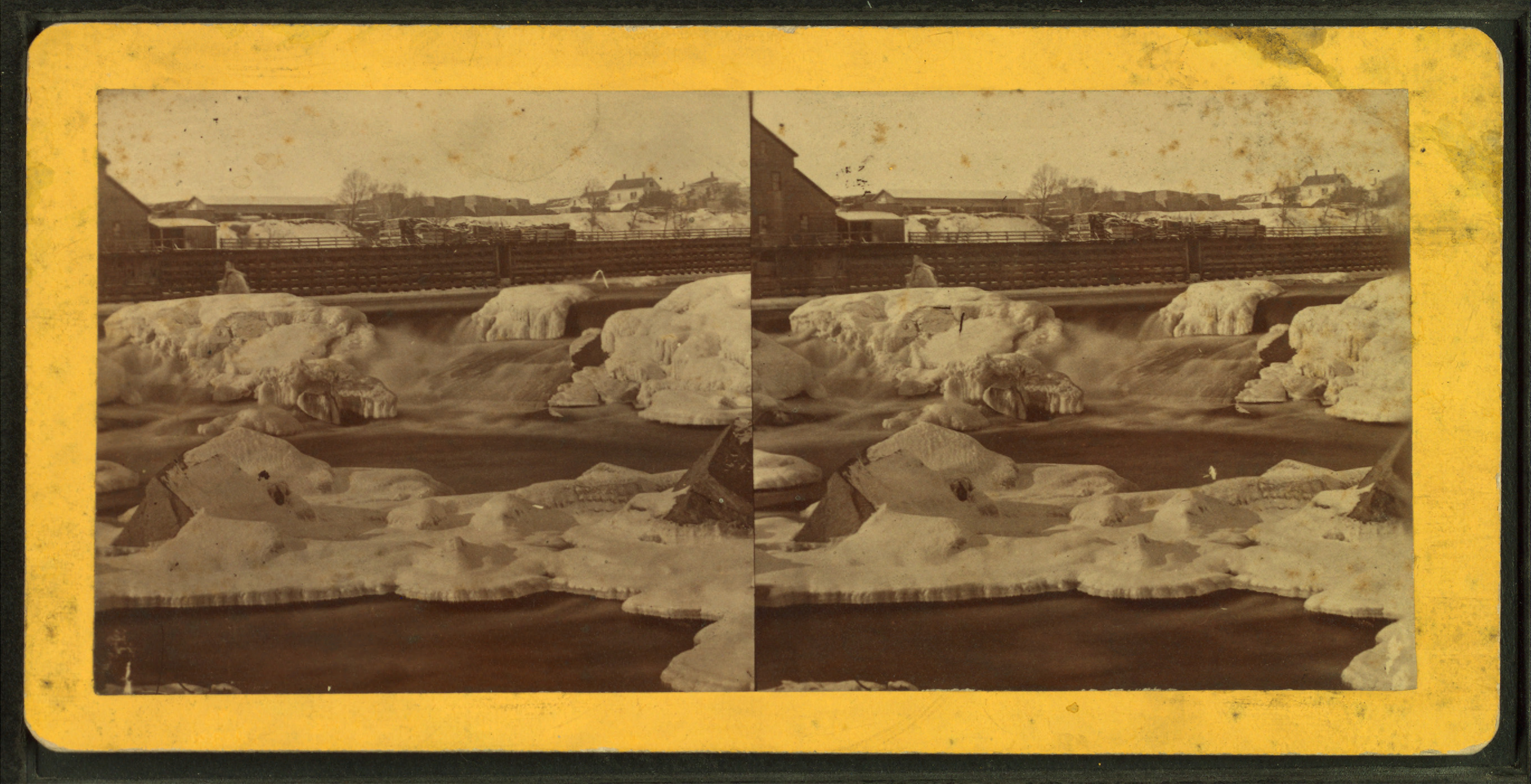
In winter

The falls hold cultural and spiritual significance for native tribes who frequented and lived in the area. The falls is an important and sacred site to the Mdewakanton Dakota and they called the Mississippi River, hahawakpa, "river of the falls". The falls (Haha) themselves were given specific names, mnirara "curling waters", owahmenah "falling waters", or owamni, "whirlpool" (mniyomni in the Eastern Dakota dialect and owamniyomni in the Teton Dakota (Lakota) dialect). Dakota associate the falls with legends and spirits, including Oanktehi, god of waters and evil, who lived beneath the falling water. A small island in the stream, called Spirit Island, was once a nesting ground for eagles that fed on fish below the falls. Dakota people camped on Nicollet Island upstream of the falls to fish and to tap the sugar maple trees.

Since the cataract had to be portaged, the area became one of the natural resting and trade points along the Mississippi between Dakota and Anishinaabe peoples. The Anishinaabe (Ojibwe) term was recorded as "kakabikah" (gakaabikaa, "split rock" or more descriptively, gichi-gakaabikaa, "the great severed rock" which referenced the jagged chunks of limestone constantly eroding by the falls).

In 1680, the falls became known to the Western world when they were observed and published in a journal by Father Louis Hennepin, a Catholic friar of Belgian birth, who had earlier brought the Niagara Falls to the world's attention via a publication. Hennepin named them the Chutes de Saint-Antoine or the Falls of Saint Anthony after his patron saint, Anthony of Padua. Later explorers to document the falls include Zebulon Montgomery Pike and Jonathan Carver, the first Englishman to undertake an exploration of the west. According to the John Carter Brown Library, "Carver's purpose was to map the land, to befriend the native Americans, and to discover the Northwest passage. His journey began in 1766 and, in some ways, was the precursor of the Lewis and Clark expedition; his book was the first popular American travel book." Carver created this early image, an engraving of the falls, in 1778.

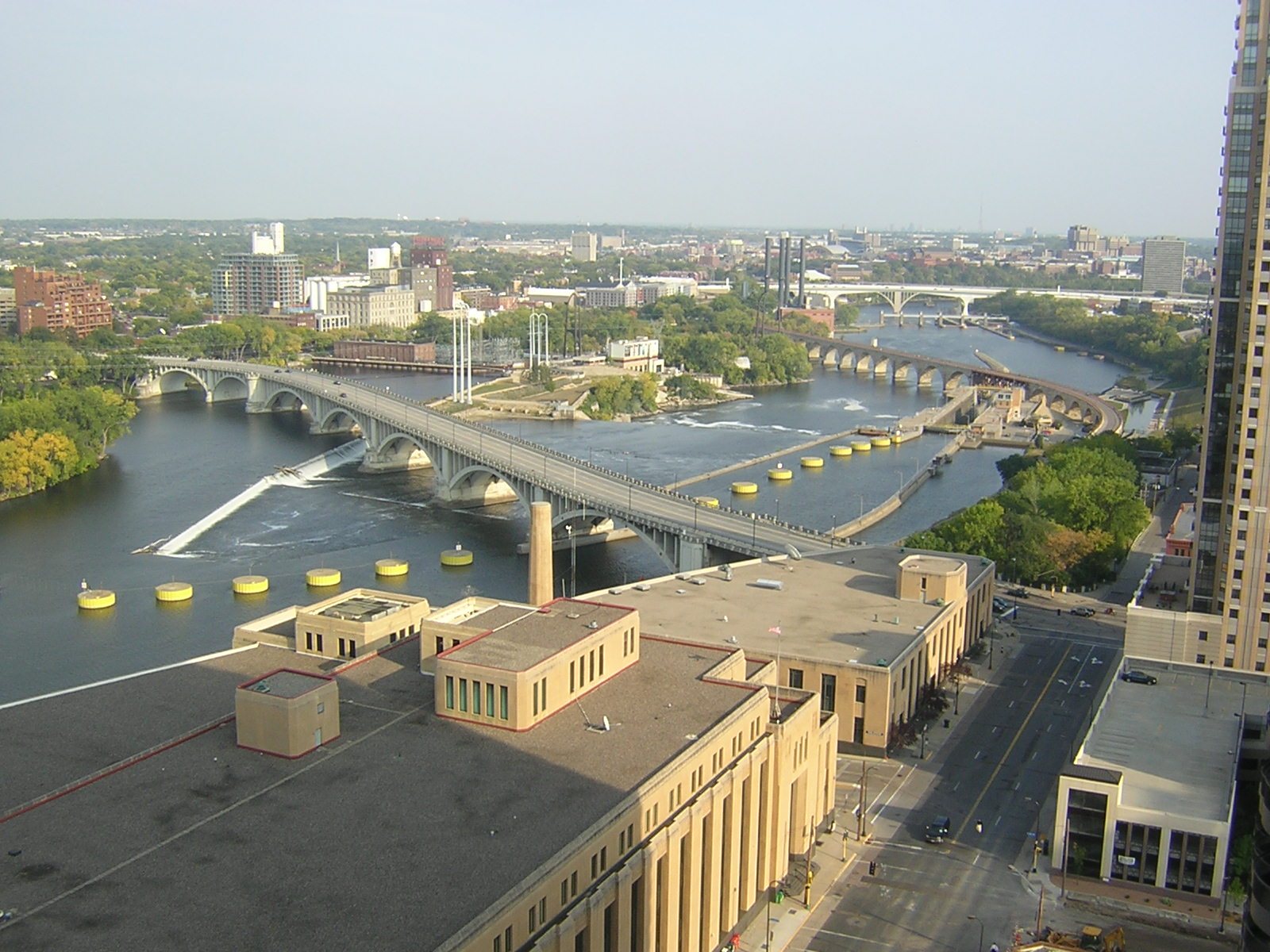
Mississippi River at Minneapolis in 2008, looking downstream. The bridge in the foreground is the Third Avenue Bridge, behind it are the Upper St Anthony Falls to the left and the upper lock and dam to the right, followed by the Stone Arch Bridge. The new I-35W Saint Anthony Falls Bridge can be seen in the background.

In 1817, Major Stephen Harriman Long headed a military excursion up the Mississippi River to the Falls of St. Anthony near the confluence with the Minnesota River. As a result of his recommendations, the Army established Fort Snelling to guard against Indian incursions against settlers in the Upper Mississippi Valley. Long recorded his experiences of the expedition in a journal, which was first published as Voyage in a Six-Oared Skiff to the Falls of St. Anthony, by the Minnesota Historical Society in 1860. In his journal, Long described the "majestic cataract" of the falls and said that "the murmuring of the cascade, the roaring of the river, and the thunder of the cataract, all contributed to render the scene the most interesting and magnificent of any I ever before witnessed."

Following the establishment of Fort Snelling in 1820, the falls became an attraction for tourists, writers, and artists who sought inspiration, even if Hennepin's descriptions were not as majestic as hoped for. By the 1850s a romantic "Indian legend" had become associated with the falls (first noted in Long's 1817 journal), describing a wife whose husband had taken a second bride. The offended first wife placed her child (or children) in a canoe and paddled toward the falls, plunging herself and her offspring to certain death as the husband looked on helplessly.

By the 1860s, industrial waste had filled the area and marred the falls' majesty. Further competition over the power of the falls on both banks of the river led to the Eastman tunnel disaster in 1869 which could have destroyed the falls. The disaster was fixed with a dike under the falls.

=== Industry ===
The first private land claim at the falls was made by Franklin Steele in 1838 — though he did not obtain financing for development until 1847, in the form of $12,000 for a nine-tenths stake in the property. On May 18, 1848, President James K. Polk approved the claims made in St. Anthony, and Steele was able to build his dam on the east side of the river above the Falls, blocking the east channel.

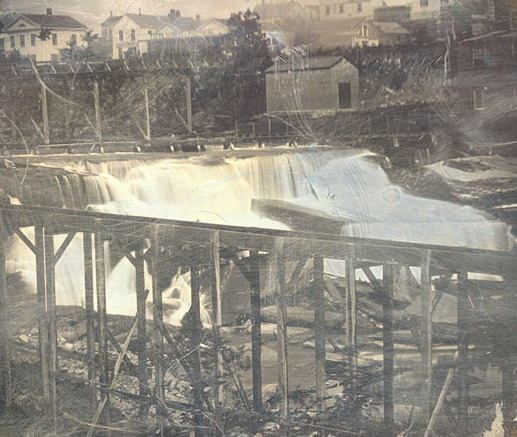
Mid 1850s Daguerreotype of St. Anthony Falls

The dam extended diagonally into the river 700 feet (210 m), was 16 feet (4.9 m) high, and was secured to the limestone riverbed. Its thickness tapered from 40 wide at its base to 12 feet (3.7 m) wide at the top. Steele dispatched logging crews to the Crow Wing River in December 1847 to supply pine for the sawmill, and by September 1, 1848, sawing commenced using two up-down saws. He was able to sell the lumber readily, supplying construction projects in the booming town. The new community at the Falls attracted entrepreneurs from New England, many of whom had experience in lumber and milling. He had hired Ard Godfrey to help build and run the first commercial sawmill at the Falls. Godfrey knew the most efficient ways to use natural resources, like the falls, and the great pine forests, to make lumber products. The house built in 1848 in St. Anthony for Godfrey is the oldest remaining wood-frame house in the Twin Cities. Steele had the town platted in 1849, and it incorporated in 1855.

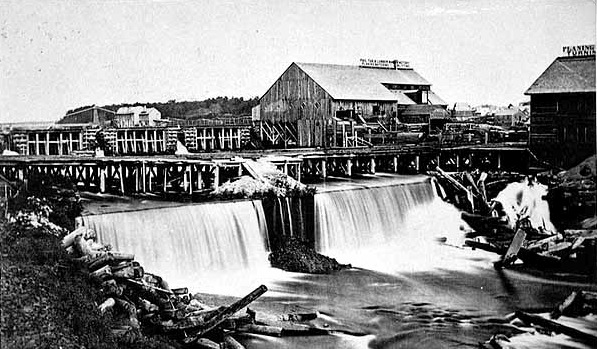
Sawmills over Saint Anthony Falls, ca. 1860.

By 1854, 300 squatters occupied the west bank of the river, and in 1855, Congress recognized the squatters' right to purchase the land they had claimed. The west side quickly developed scores of new mills and consortia. They built a dam diagonally into the river to the north, which, along with Steele's dam created the inverted V-shape, still apparent today. Steele created the St. Anthony Falls Water Power Company in 1856 with three New York financiers, Davis, Gebhard, and Sanford. The company struggled for several years, due to poor relations with the financiers, a depression, and the Civil War. In 1868, the firm reorganized with new officers including John Pillsbury, Richard and Samuel Chute, Sumner Farnham, and Frederick Butterfield.

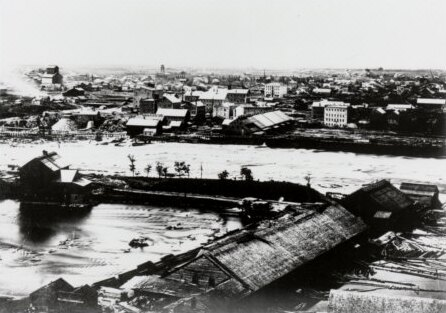
Looking northeast across the river ca. 1868

As Minneapolis (and its former neighbor across the river, St. Anthony) developed, the water power at the falls became a source of power for several industries including textile mills, wool, machinery, paper, and wood products, of which the North Star Woolen Mill was successful. Sawmills made the falls a major lumber producing area, with the mills largely built on platforms above the limestone cap forming the falls. Subsequently, the dominant industry became flour milling.

The falls industrialization caused problems. Logs, sometimes a hundred at a time, escaped from log booms and hammered the falls. Diversion of water left parts of the limestone cap dry, increasing weathering effects. Shafts and tunnels from sawmills and other users weakened the limestone and its sandstone foundation, accelerating the falls' upriver erosion to 26 feet (7.9 m) per year between 1857 and 1868. The falls quickly approached the edge of the limestone cap; once the limestone had completely eroded away, the falls would degenerate into sandstone rapids unsuitable for waterpower. To protect the falls and stop upstream progression a protective wood timber apron was built from the edge of the falls sloping downstream. The apron dissipated the energy of the falling water and moved it away from the base of the falls. It also protected from errant logs. An apron built in 1866 lasted until 1867. The Corps of Engineers completed one in 1880 that lasted until destroyed in 1952. It was replaced with a concrete apron.

The usual flour milling techniques did not work well for "spring wheat", which is the only kind that could be dependably grown on the rapidly expanding wheat farms in Minnesota and the Dakotas. In the late 1860s, major milling innovations at the falls were a "middlings purifier" and "gradual-reduction" grinding, both borrowed from Europe. Metal rollers replaced grindstones. The changes not only solved the spring wheat problem but produced high quality flour in a milling process that was highly profitable. As the result of the new technology, flour mills began to dominate the falls after 1870.

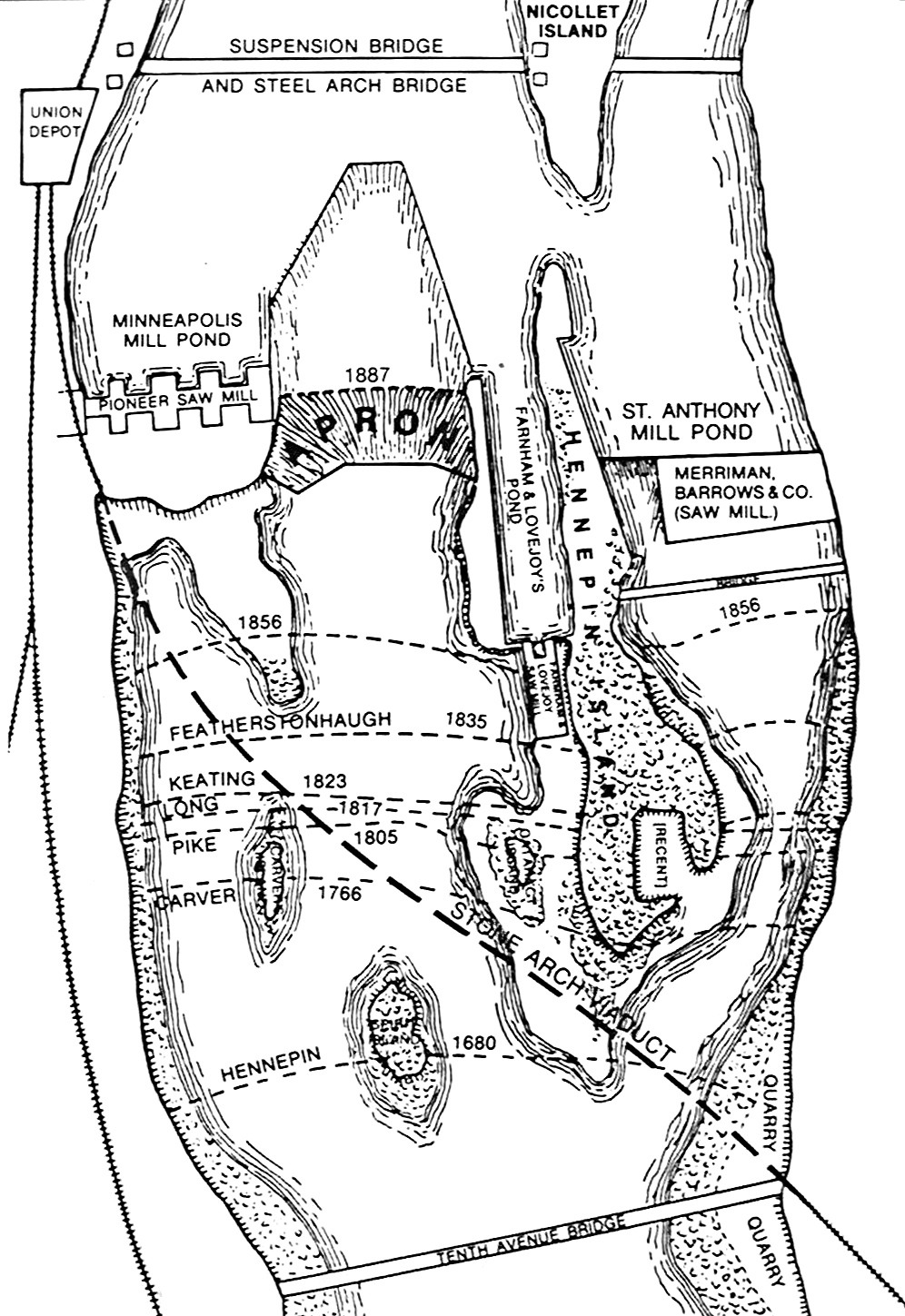
A diagram showing the recession of the falls between 1680 and 1887

Millers on the Minneapolis side formed a consortium to extract power with the "Lowell model" in which water was supplied in a large headrace "power canal" connecting to the millpond above the falls and extending 950 feet (290 m) parallel to the river below the falls. Mills built on both sides of the power canal diverted upper-level water into waterwheel-equipped vertical shafts (driven through the limestone bedrock into the soft, underlying sandstone) and then through horizontal tailrace tunnels to the falls' lower level. This system was very effective and mills lined the canal. "turning the west side of the river into the country's most densely industrialized, direct-drive waterpower district." The mills on the St. Anthony (east) side of the river were less-well organized for harnessing the power, and therefore industry developed at a slower pace on that side. But the Pillsbury A-Mill, built on the east bank and completed in 1881, was the world's largest flour mill for 18 years. It produced about 1/3 as much flour as the entire west side. The mills at the falls were very large and substantially automated. "By the end of the century, they had created the country's greatest waterpower industrial district, which was also the country's leading flour milling center from 1880 to 1930."

By the early 1900s, three companies controlled 97% of the falls flour production. They were the Pillsbury-Washburn Flour Mills Company (later Pillsbury Flour Mills Company and now General Mills), the Washburn-Crosby Company (later General Mills), and Northwestern Consolidated Milling Company (later Standard Milling Company)." The Pillsbury and Washburn-Crosby companies were started at the falls.

=== 1869 collapse of the Eastman tunnel ===
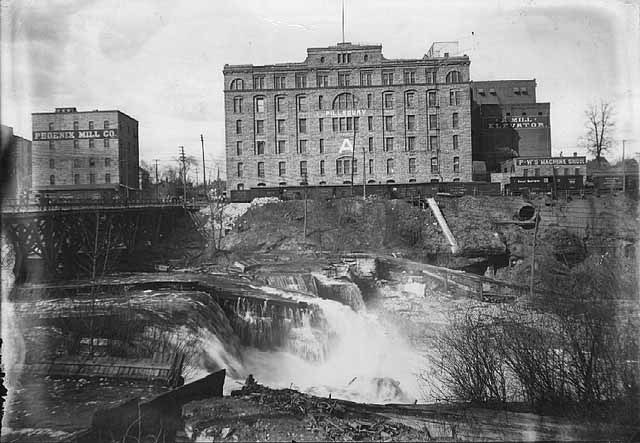
The falls in the early 20th century

The early dams built to harness the waterpower exposed the limestone to freezing and thawing forces, narrowed the channel, and increased damage from floods. A report in 1868 found that only 1,100 feet (340 m) of the limestone remained upstream, and if it were eroded away, the falls would turn into a rapids that would no longer be useful for waterpower. Meanwhile, as the result of a lawsuit, the St. Anthony Falls Water Power Company approved a plan for the firm of William W. Eastman and John L. Merriam to build a tailrace tunnel from below the falls, under Hennepin Island, under the riverbed to Nicollet Island. Nicollet Island is 700 feet (210 m) or more above the falls. The tailrace tunnel would allow waterpower development at the Island. This plan met with disaster on October 5, 1869, when the limestone cap was breached.

The leak turned into a torrent of water coming out the tunnel. The water blasted Hennepin Island, causing a 150-foot (46 m) section to collapse into the tunnel. Believing that the mills and all the other industries around the falls would be ruined, hundreds of people rushed to view the impending disaster. Groups of volunteers started shoring up the gap by throwing trees and timber into the river, but that was ineffective. They then built a huge raft of timbers from the milling operations on Nicollet Island. This worked briefly, but also proved ineffective. A number of workers worked for months to build a dam that would funnel water away from the tunnel. The next year, an engineer from Lowell, Massachusetts, recommended completing a wooden apron, sealing the tunnel, and building low dams above the falls to avoid exposing the limestone to the weather.

The fix for the tunnel disaster was a concrete dike constructed by the United States Army Corps of Engineers. The dike was just above the falls and Hennepin Island, from right under the limestone cap down as much as 40 feet (12 m), and 1,850 feet (560 m) long across the entire river channel. The dike, completed 1876, cut off the tunnel and any possible future bypass channels. A separate problem was damage to the falls and its upstream progression. To stop the damage the Corps built a protective wood timber apron completed 1880. The Corps also built two low dams, completed by 1880, on top of the limestone cap to keep the cap wet. The federal government spent $615,000 on this effort, while the two cities spent $334,500.

=== Hydroelectric power production ===
Hydroelectric power production also developed early at the falls. In 1881, the Pillsbury "A" Mill added a Brush Electric arc light plant powered from their turbines; some other mills did so also. In 1882, a Brush hydroelectric central station plant was in use, the third central station in the country. (Edison's Pearl Street Station also started producing electric power in 1882 - using steam.) The waterpower companies encouraged or developed hydroelectric plants. Major plants were completed in 1894. 1895, and 1908. (The first large scale production of electricity in the world was at the Adams (Tesla) plant at Niagara Falls starting 1895). As waterpower became available it was used to generate electricity. After the third plant was in operation in 1908, 45% of the waterpower being used was for hydroelectric. One of the historic St. Anthony Falls plants is still operating.

River flow is variable and flour production may have to be decreased with low flow rates. In the winter, mills may shut down because there is not enough water flow. So many mills supplemented water power with steam, starting with a 1,400 HP steam engine at the Pillsbury A mill in 1884. By 1892 ten of the fifteen mills had supplementary steam power. As electricity developed as a power source, some electricity was generated from steam to run equipment. Using electricity from the St. Anthony Falls hydroelectric plants was not very practical because those plants competed for the same water flow. But about 1910 electric power was available from St. Croix Falls and it was used in combination with waterpower and steam, and electricity eventually took over.

The Mississippi river flow rate changes based on how much rain there is its watershed. Starting 1880, dams were created on the Mississippi further north to create reservoirs - water could be released to increase flow at times when it would be low. This helped both waterpower industries and river navigation. The dams were at Lake Winnibigoshish, Leech Lake, Pokegama Falls, Pine River, Sandy Lake, and Gull Lake.

== Locks and dams ==
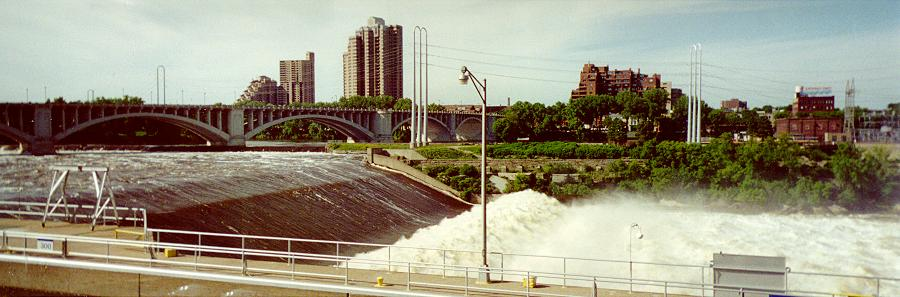
The concrete apron over St. Anthony Falls is engineered to produce the pronounced hydraulic jump evident in this photo.

St. Paul was effectively the upper limit of commercial navigation on the Mississippi. High bluffs on both sides of the river from the River Waren falls and the falls progressing up the Mississippi, made access difficult. In addition the rapid descent of the river from the falls to below what is now the Ford Dam (lock and dam No. 1) made the river shallow and fast running. The Ford dam, completed 1917, extended navigation to a little above the Washington Ave. bridge, with a shipping terminal on the west bank. Locks completed in 1956 at the lower dam and around the falls in 1963 extended navigation out of the river gorge to north Minneapolis. Since those two locks are smaller than most of the locks on the rest of the river, the practical limit for many commercial tows was still further downriver. In 2015, the Upper St. Anthony Falls lock was permanently closed to stop the spread of invasive species, namely Asian carp.

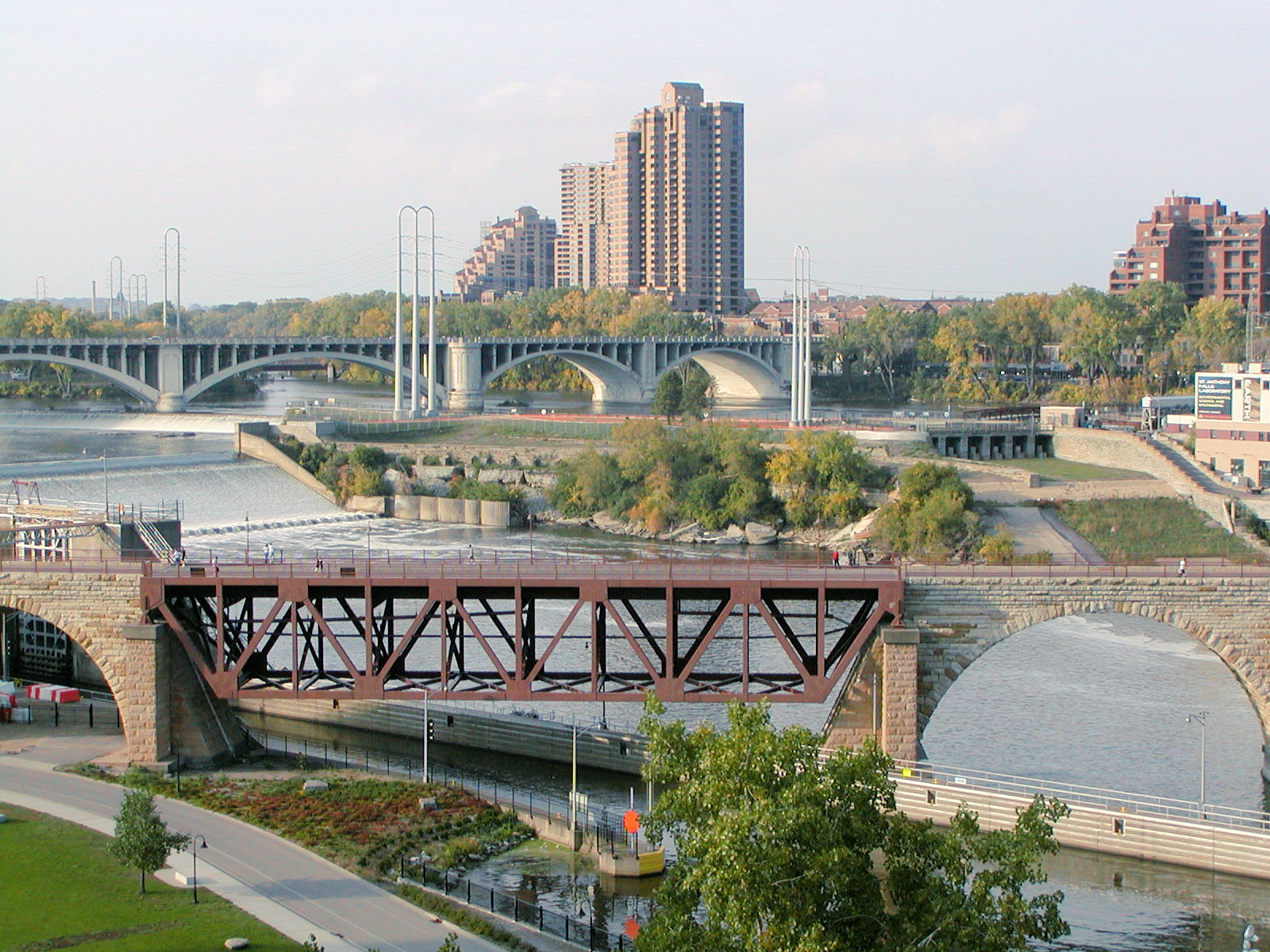
In 1963 the Stone Arch Bridge was altered to allow clearance for the upper lock.

The St. Anthony Falls and the Upper Dam. The upper dam ("horseshoe dam"), built on top of the limestone cap forming the falls, is successor to dams built in the 1850s. The dam increases the head for two hydroelectric plants and increases the water level above the falls. The water level rise from the falls is 35 feet (11 m) and from the dam is 14 feet (4.3 m). The lift at this lock, 49 feet (15 m), is the highest of any lock on the Mississippi. The upper pool has a normal capacity of 3,150 acre-feet (3,890,000 m^{3}) and a normal level of 799 feet (244 m) above sea level. The navigation channel required alteration of the historic Stone Arch Bridge, which now has a metal truss section to allow ships to pass below.

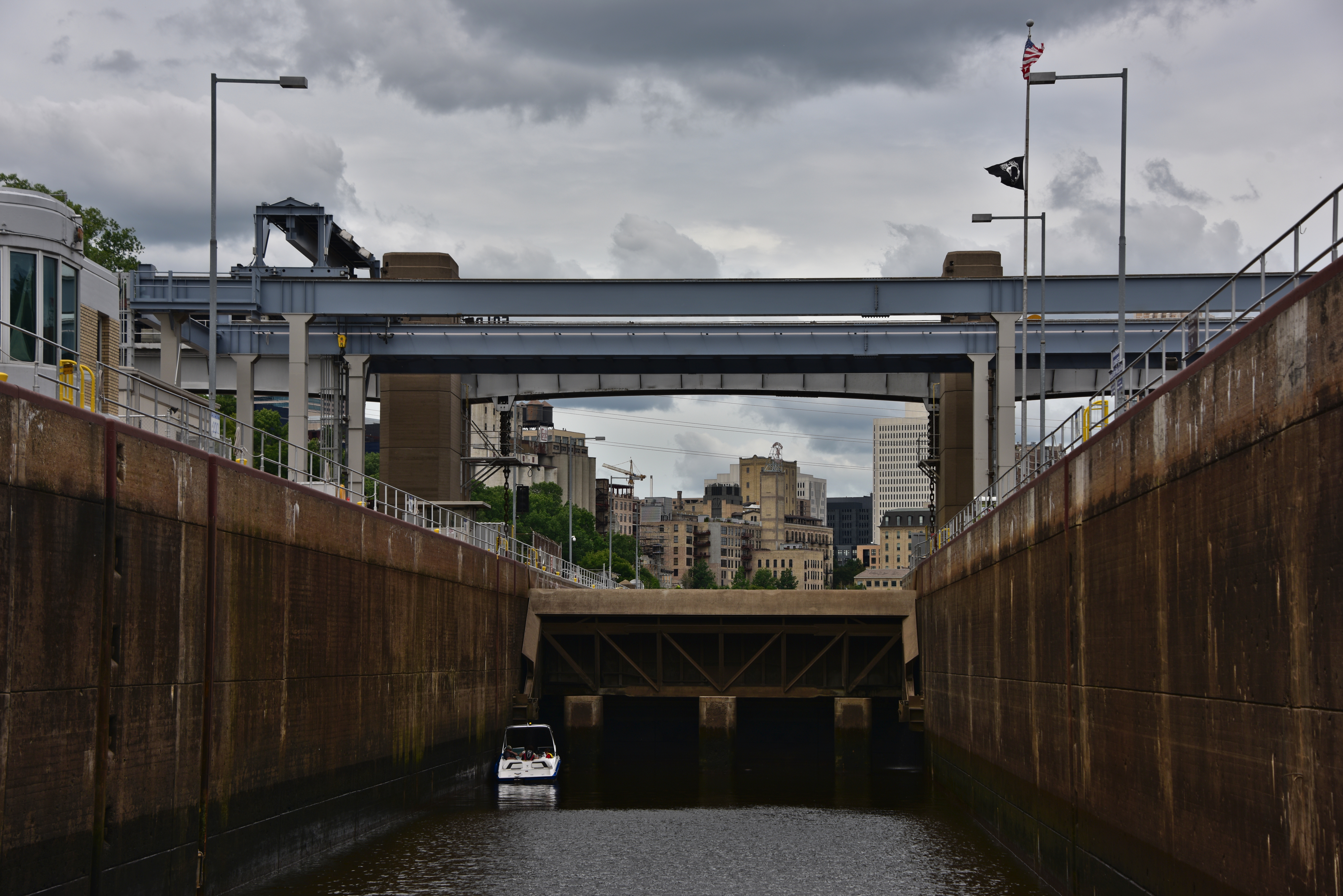
The lower lock

The Lower St. Anthony Falls Dam, located about a half mile below the falls, was completed 1897 with a water level rise of 20 feet (6.1 m). The dam was built for hydroelectric production, and included a power plant. There never was a falls at this location. The dam was rebuilt and locks added in 1956. The rise was increased to 25 feet (7.6 m). The new dam is a gravity-type hydro-electric dam 26 feet (7.9 m) in height, consisting of a 275-foot (84 m) long concrete spillway with four tainter gates. The upper pool (sometimes called the intermediate pool) has a normal capacity of 375 acre-feet (463,000 m^{3}) and a normal level of 750 feet (229 m) above sea level.

The upper and lower locks are each 56 feet (17 m) wide by 400 feet (120 m) long.

The current around the spillway/falls is often swift and dangerous. In 1991, a small boat drifted too close and fell over one part of the dam. One person on board was killed, and one had to be rescued by helicopter. Rescues at the site are usually much less dramatic, but continue to happen occasionally.

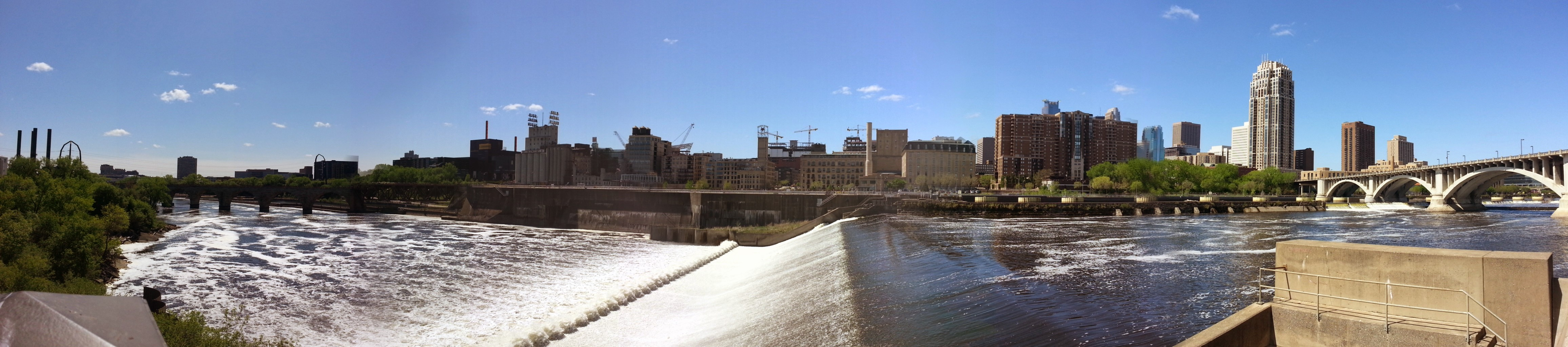
Panoramic photo from the new Water Power Park, visible from this vantage: the lower portion of Saint Anthony Falls; the concrete wall on the far side of the falls is part of the locks to allow ships to pass the waterfall; to the left is the Stone Arch Bridge, above it is the Guthrie Theater; to the right of the Guthrie are the white silos and reconstructed shell of the former Washburn "A" Mill, now the Mill City Museum; to the right of the museum are a series of redeveloped flour and grain mills making up a significant portion of the city's Mills District.

== Geology ==
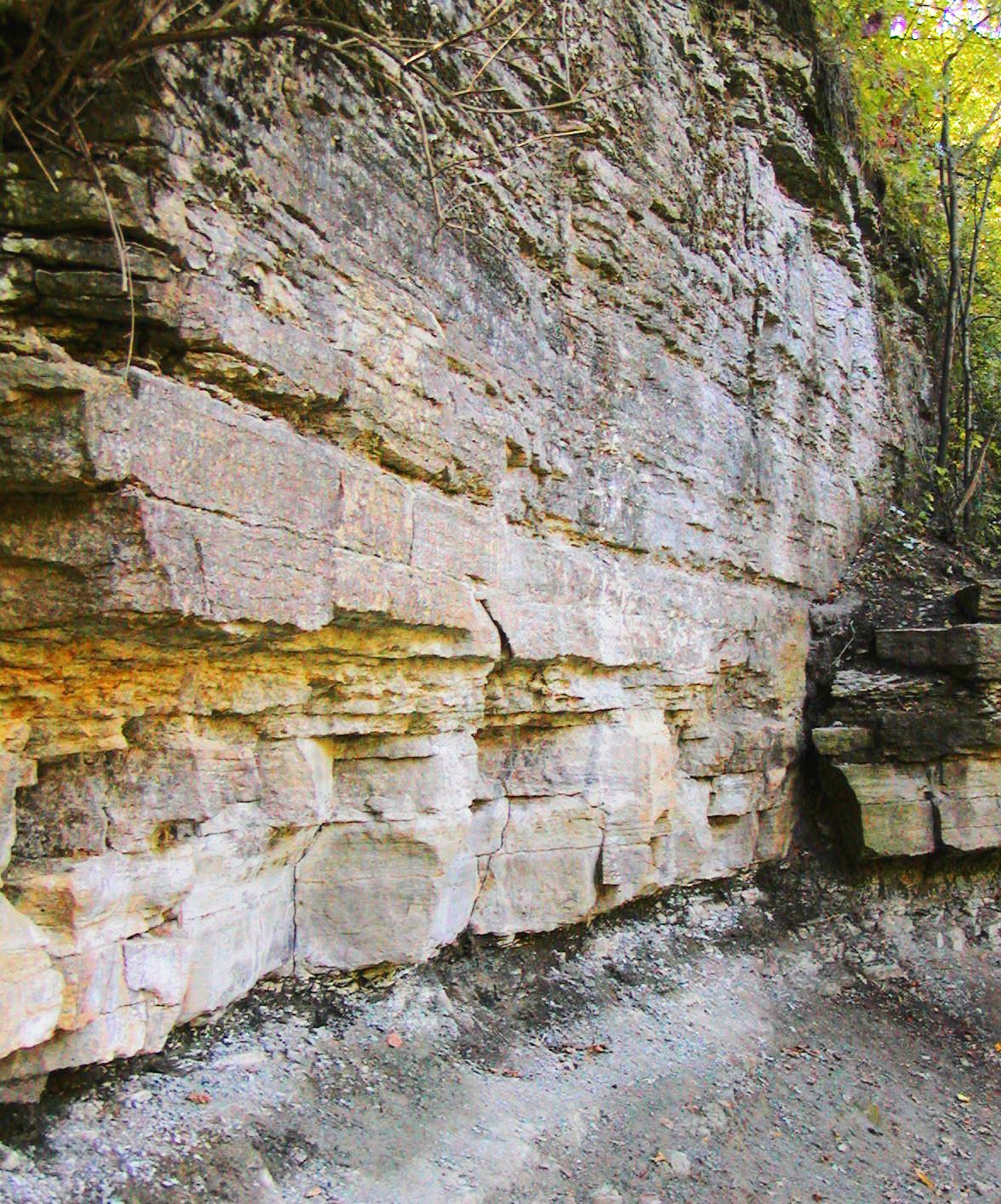
Sandstone layered under limestone

Geologists say that the falls first appeared roughly 12,000 years ago about 10 miles (16 km) downstream at the confluence of the glacial River Warren (at present-day Fort Snelling). Estimates are that the falls were about 180 feet (55 m) high when the River Warren Falls receded past the confluence of the Mississippi River and the glacial River Warren. Over the succeeding 10,000 years, the falls moved upstream to its present location. The water churning at the bottom of the falls ate away at the soft sandstone, eventually breaking off the hard limestone cap in chunks as the falls receded. From its origins near Fort Snelling, St. Anthony Falls relocated upstream at a rate of about 4 feet (1.2 m) per year until it reached its present location in the early 19th century. In the 6 miles (9.7 km) from the top of the falls (not including the horseshoe dam) to below the Ford dam the river drops 97 feet (30 m), all of it the remnant of the original 180 feet (55 m) falls. The limestone cap gets thinner upriver from the falls, and the cap disappears about 1,200 feet (370 m) upstream. In a short time, geologically speaking, the falls will reach the end of the cap and become a rapids. Tributaries such as Minnehaha Creek begot their own waterfalls as the Mississippi River valley was cut into the landscape.

When Father Louis Hennepin documented the falls he estimated the falls' height to be 50 to 60 feet (15 to 18 m). Later explorers described it as being in the range of 16 to 20 feet (4.9 to 6.1 m) high. The height of the falls, not including the upper dam, is now 35 feet (11 m). The river descends downstream from the falls, which might add another 10 feet (3.0 m) to the falls where they were when Hennepin saw them.

The geological formation of the area consisted of a hard thin layer of Platteville Formation, a limestone, overlaying the soft St. Peter Sandstone subsurface. These layers were the result of an Ordovician Period sea which covered east-central Minnesota 500 million years ago.

== Historic and commemorative markers ==
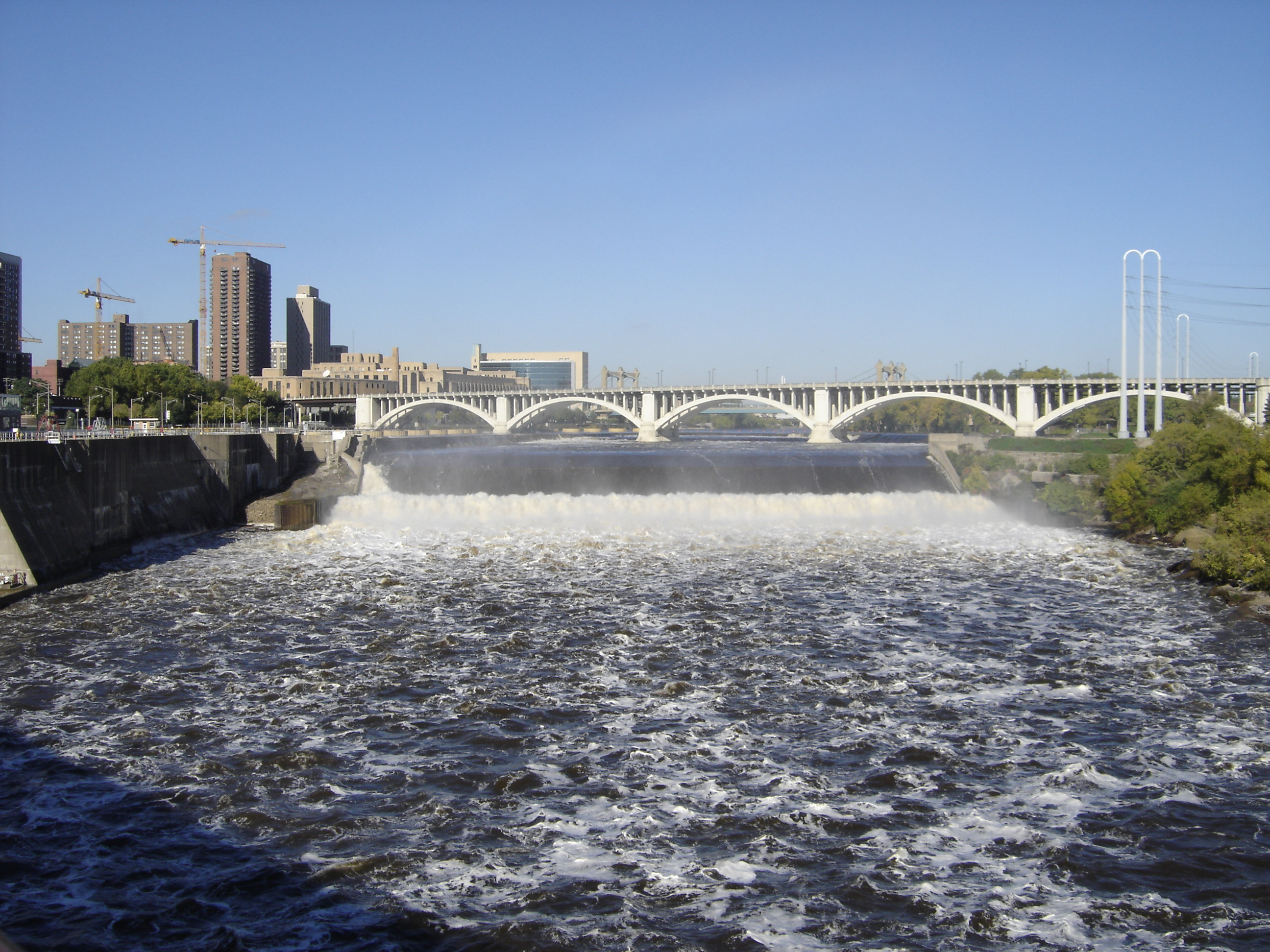
The St. Anthony Falls with upper lock on the left. The Third Avenue Bridge can be seen in the background. Photo taken in October 2005.

The area around the river was added to the National Register of Historic Places as the St. Anthony Falls Historic District in 1971. It includes 8th Avenue Northeast extending downstream to 6th Avenue Southeast and approximately two city blocks on both shoreline. The falls are a contributing resource to the Historic District. The district's archaeological record is one of the most-endangered historic sites in Minnesota. The National Register of Historic Places is facilitated by the National Park Service. The national significance of the Saint Anthony Falls Historic District is a major reason why the National Park Service's Mississippi National River and Recreation Area was established along the Mississippi River in the Minneapolis – Saint Paul metropolitan area.

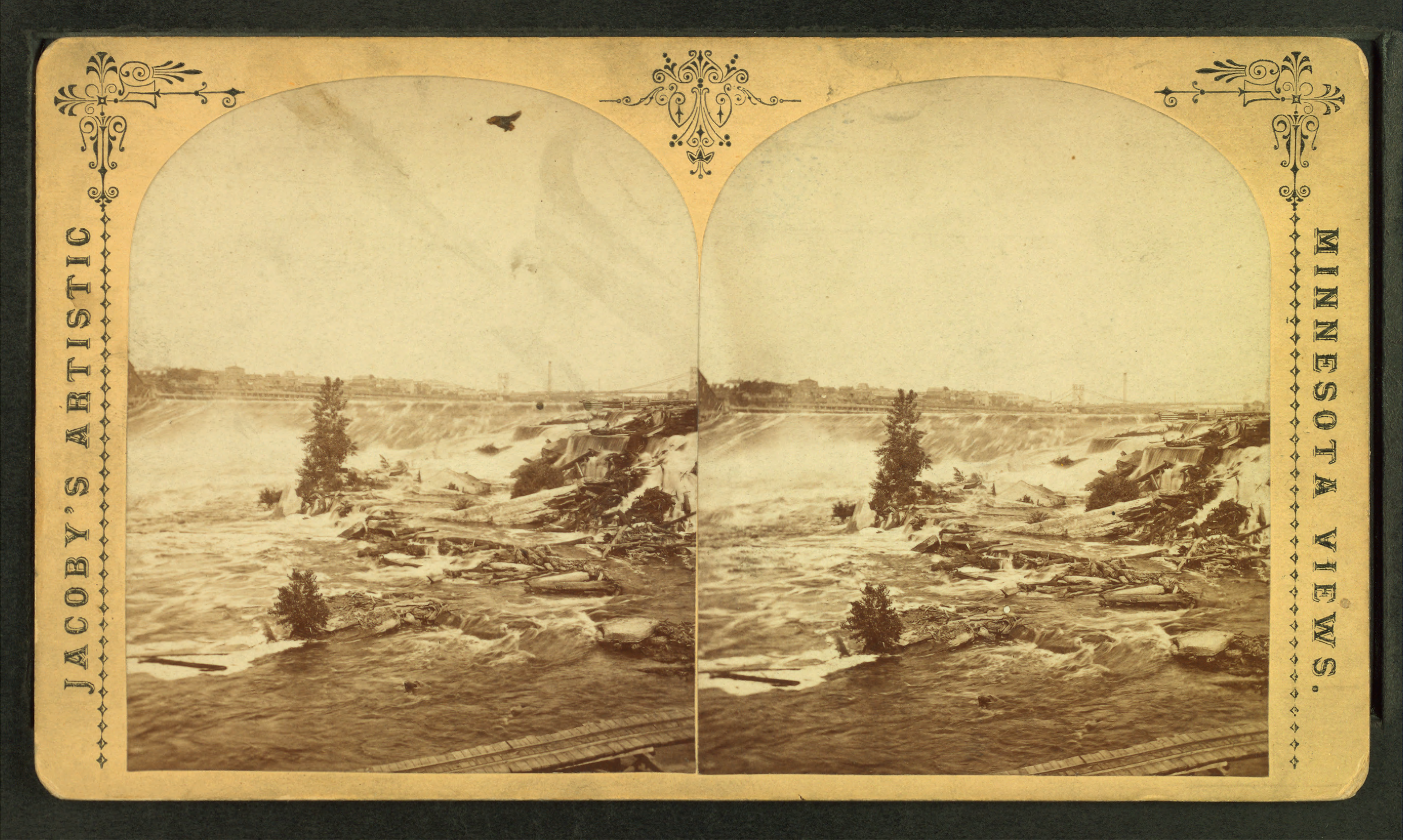
Stereoscopic photo of the falls by William H. Jacoby

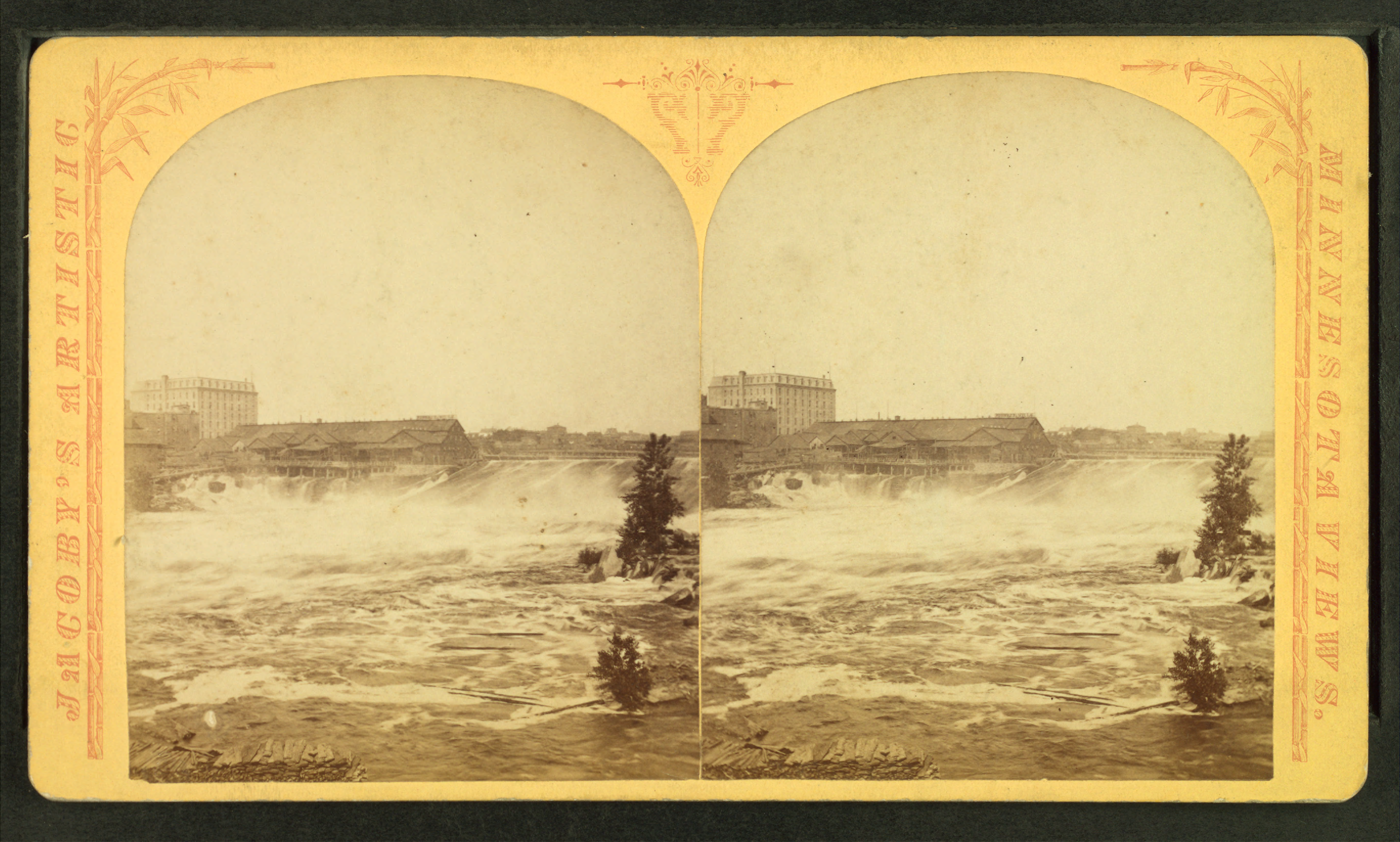
Another view by Jacoby

A Heritage Trail plaque nearby says,

For untold generations of Indian people the Mississippi River was an important canoe route. To pass around the falls, the Dakota (Sioux) and Ojibwe (Chippewa) used a well-established portage trail. Starting at a landing below the site now occupied by the steam plant, the trail climbed the bluff to this spot. From here it followed the east bank along what is now Main Street to a point well above the falls.

Water Works park overlooking the falls opened in 2021.

== In popular culture ==
Along with Yosemite Valley, Saint Anthony Falls held a particular attraction for painters of 19th-century landscapes. The falls were a popular tourist attraction at the time, and were depicted in many paintings, including works by Albert Bierstadt, Henry Lewis, and George Catlin.

Mark Twain visited the falls as part of his journeys recounted in the 1883 memoir Life on the Mississippi; the original printing of the book included a drawing by John Harley of the falls. Twain noted that the waterfall's industrial capacity was "of inestimable value, business-wise, though somewhat to the damage of the Falls as a spectacle, or as a background against which to get your photograph taken".

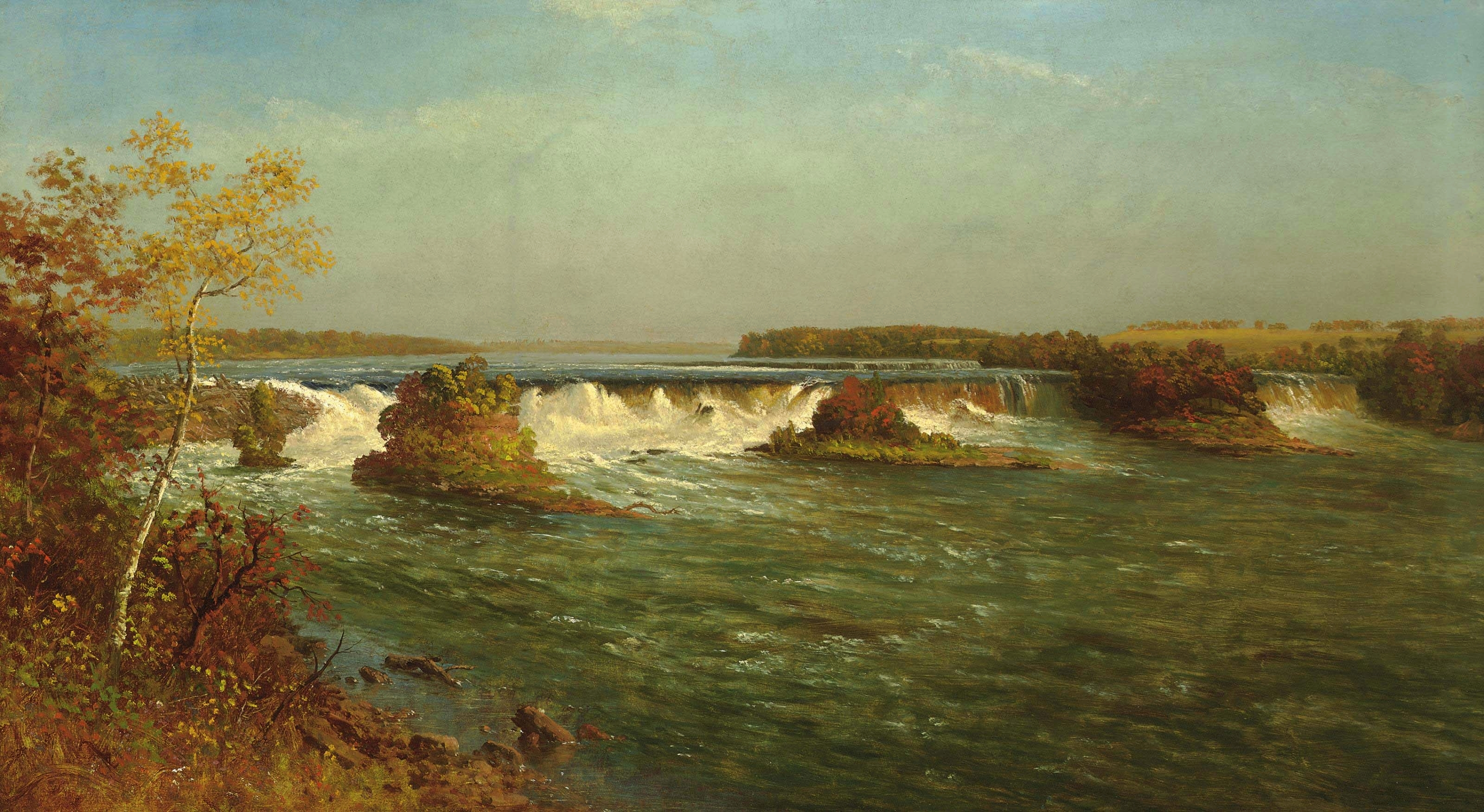
The Falls of Saint Anthony, a second painting of Saint Anthony Falls by Albert Bierstadt, 1887

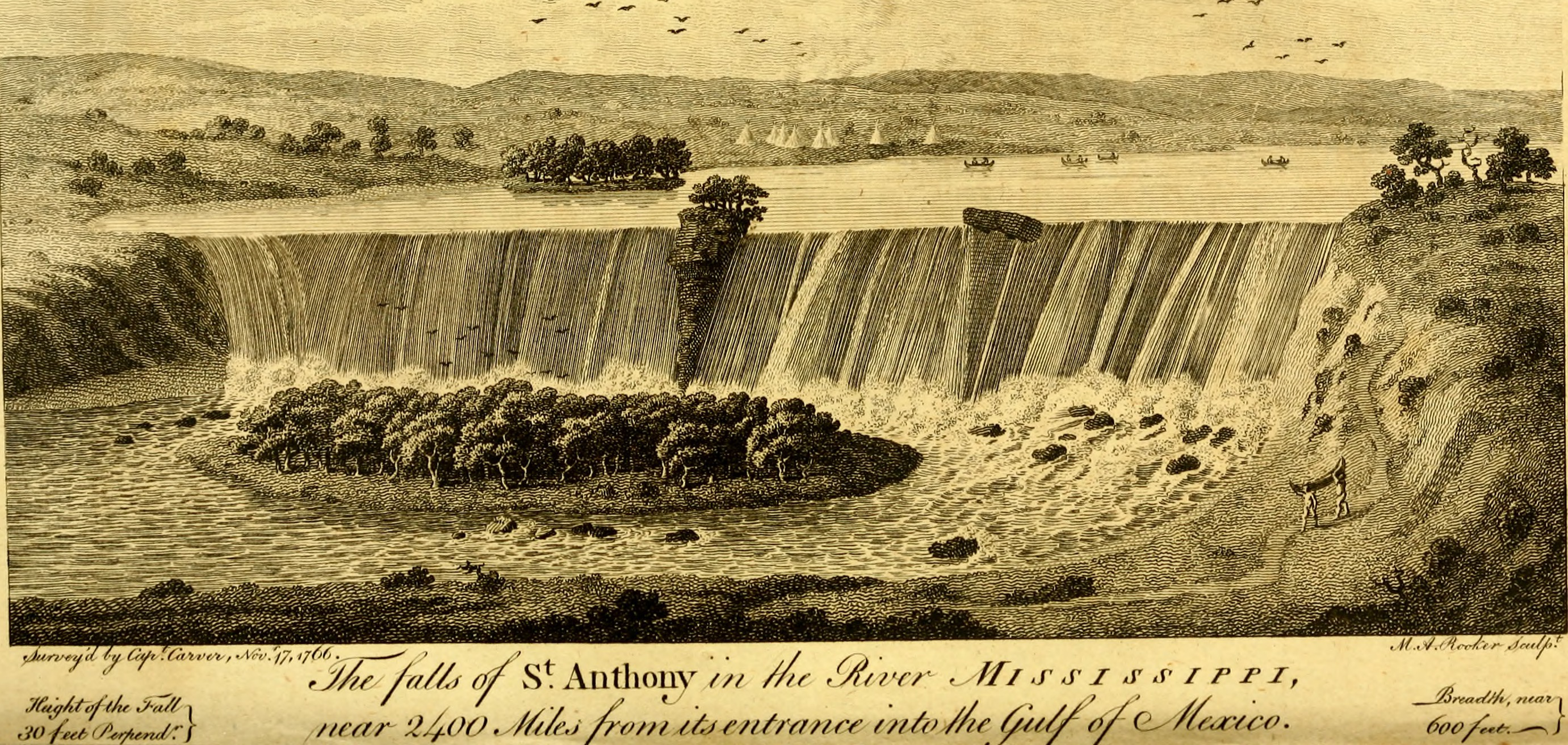
An image of Saint Anthony Falls from Jonathan Carver's 1781 book Travels Through the Interior Parts of North America, In the Years 1766, 1767, and 1768.

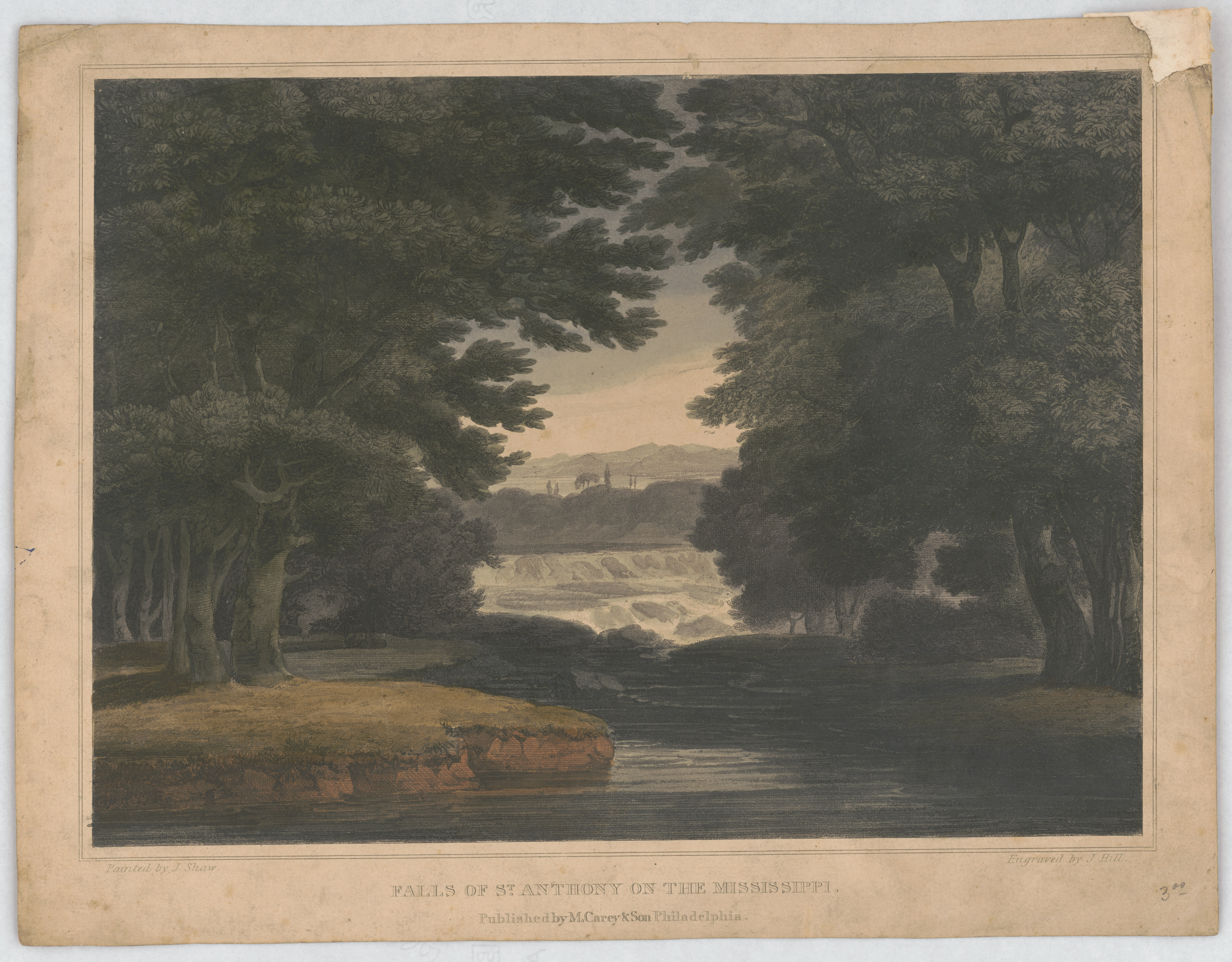
Falls of St. Anthony on the Mississippi, painted by Joshua Shaw; engraved by John Hill, 1819. Library of Congress.

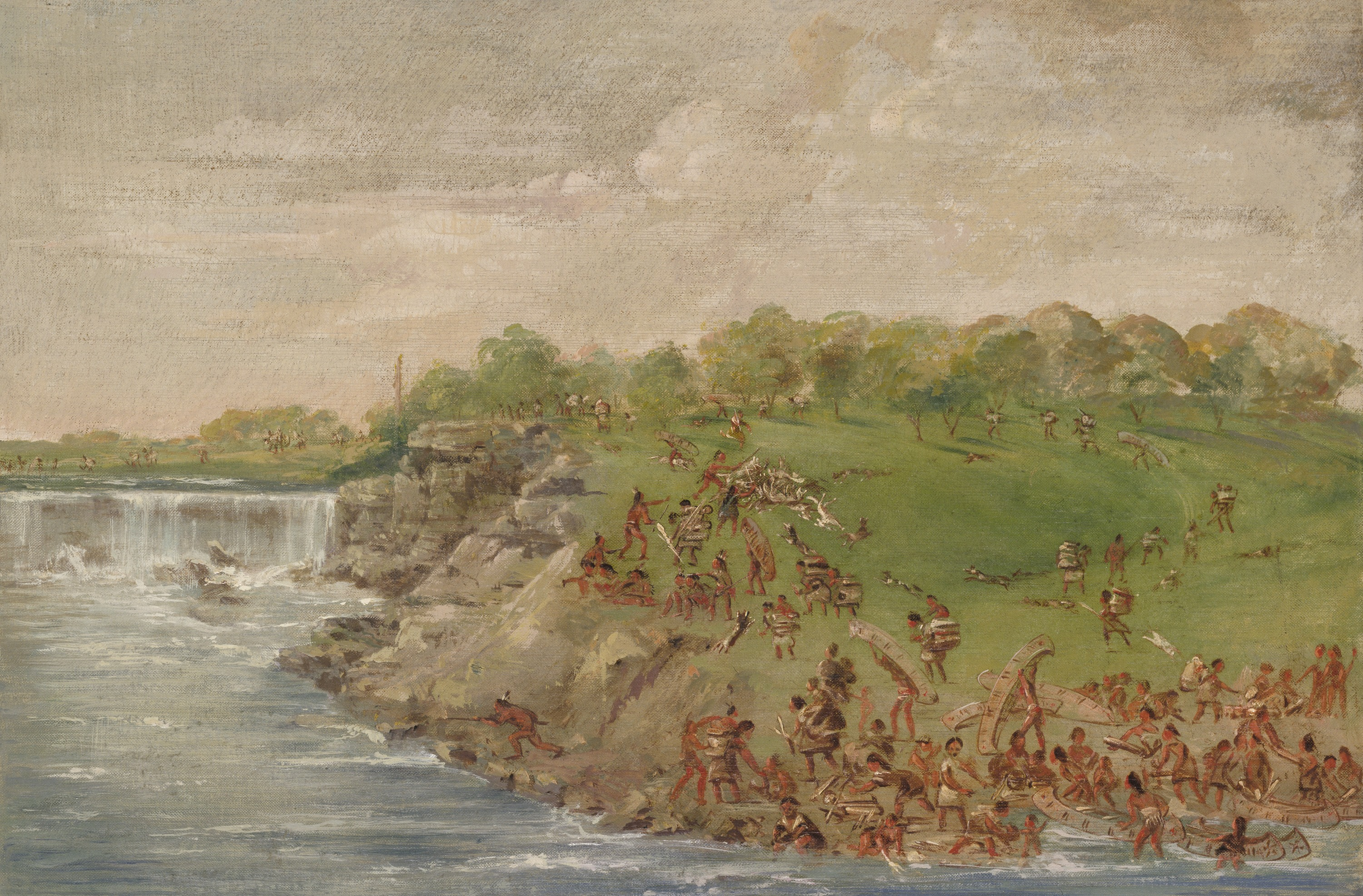
George Catlin, Ojibwa Portaging Around the Falls of St. Anthony, 1835-1836 (Smithsonian American Art Museum)

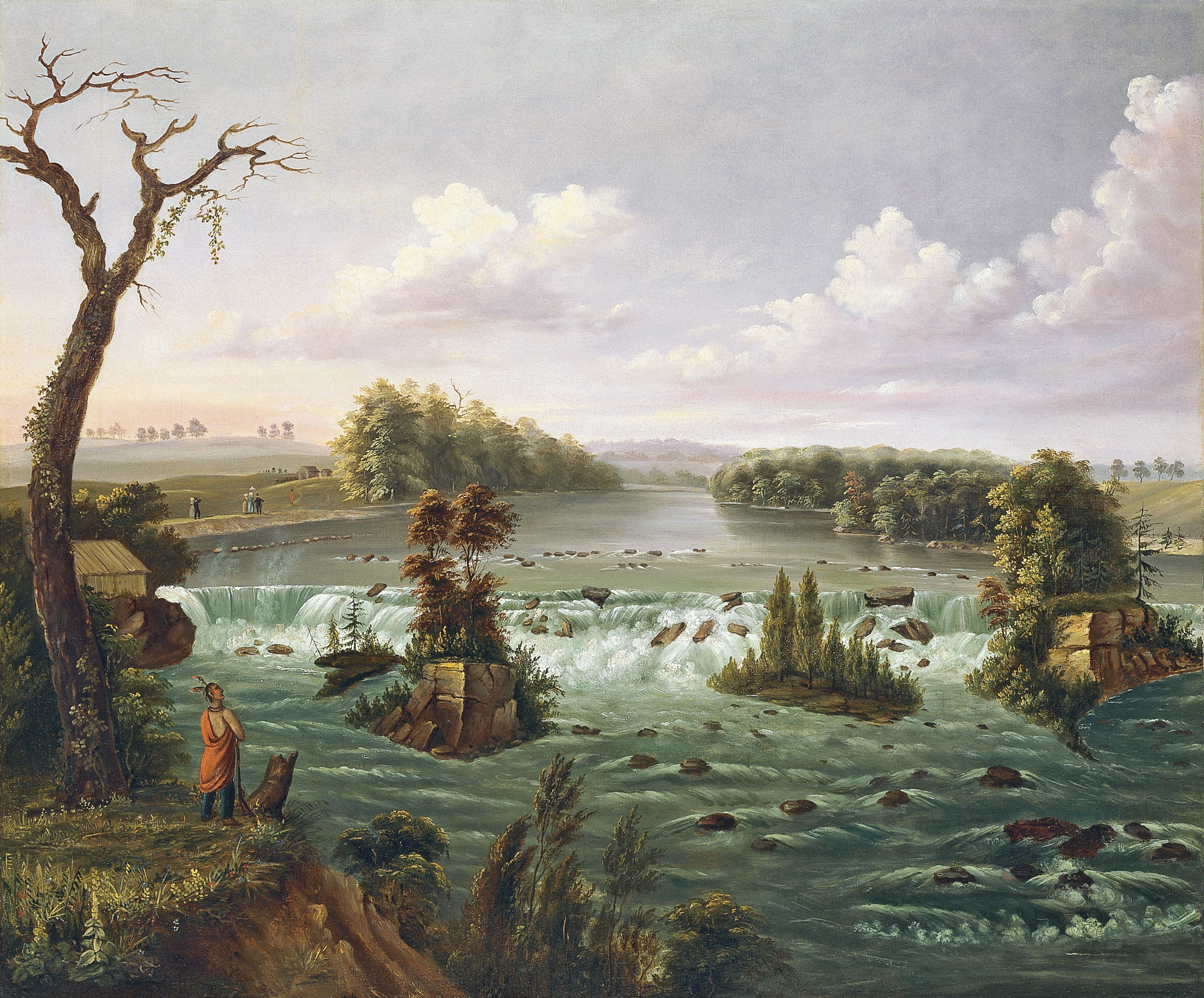
The Falls of Saint Anthony, Alto Mississippi, Henry Lewis, 1847. Thyssen-Bornemisza Museum.

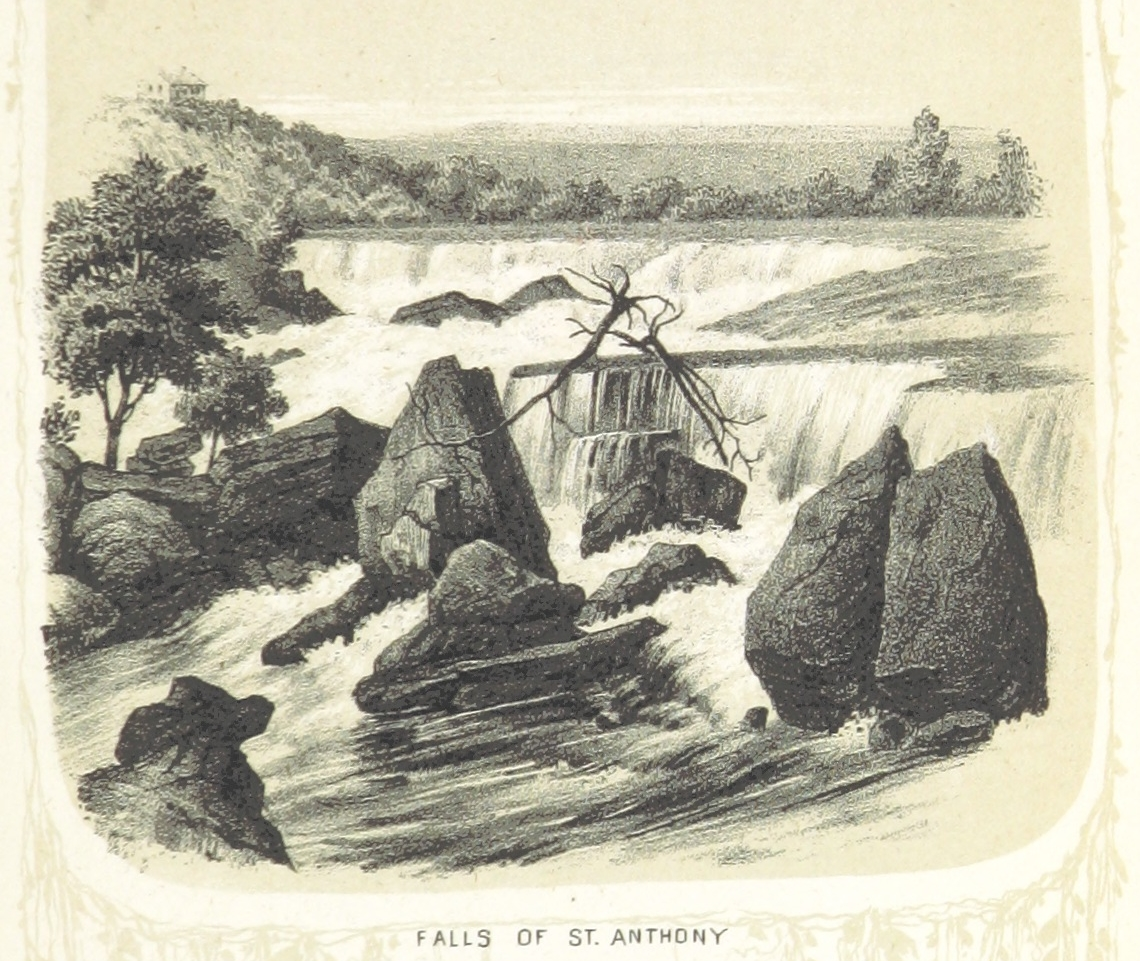
An illustration of the falls from the 1856 book Minnesota and Its Resources by John Wesley Bond. British Library.

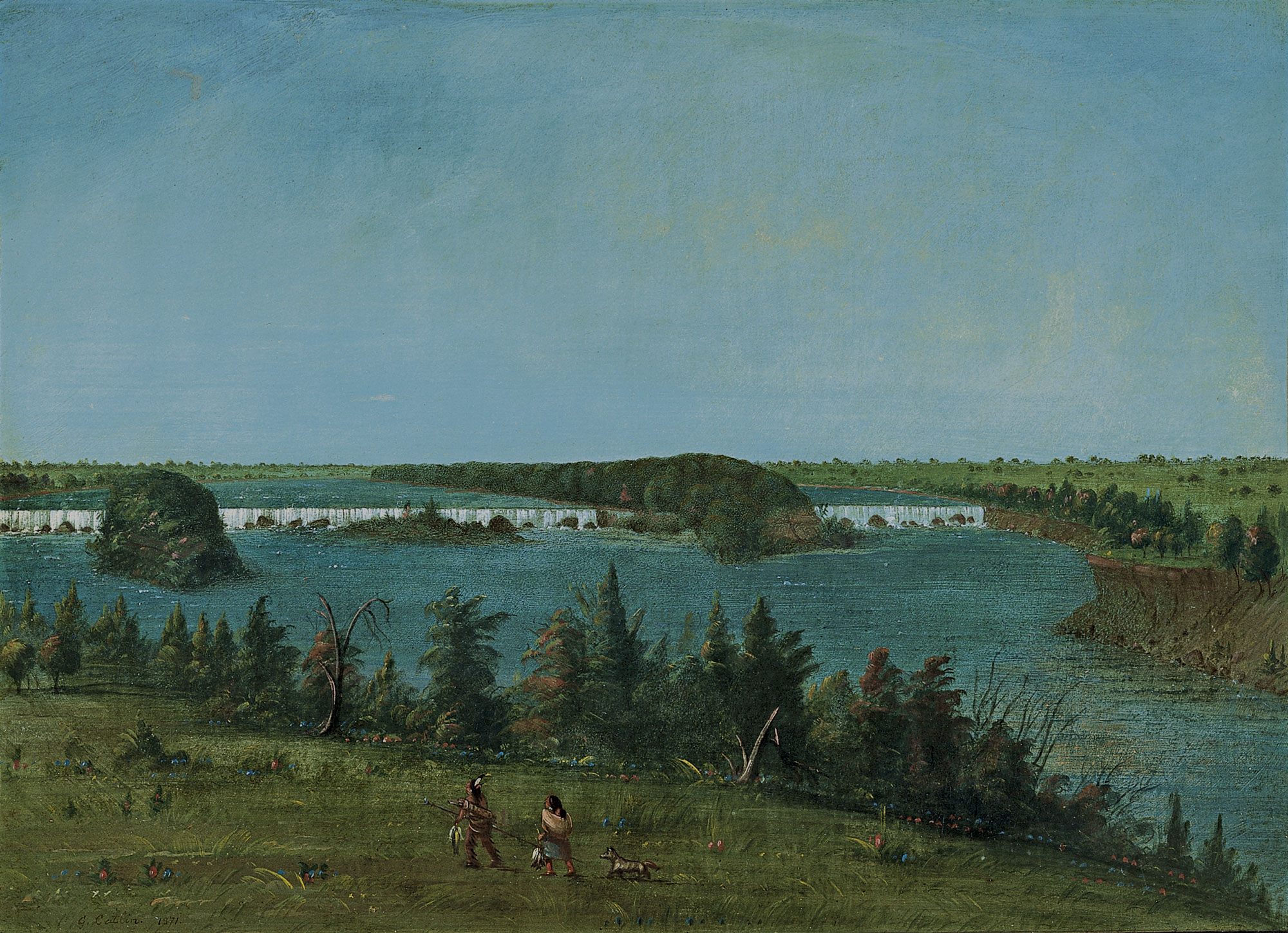
The Falls of Saint Anthony, George Catlin, 1871. Thyssen-Bornemisza Museum.

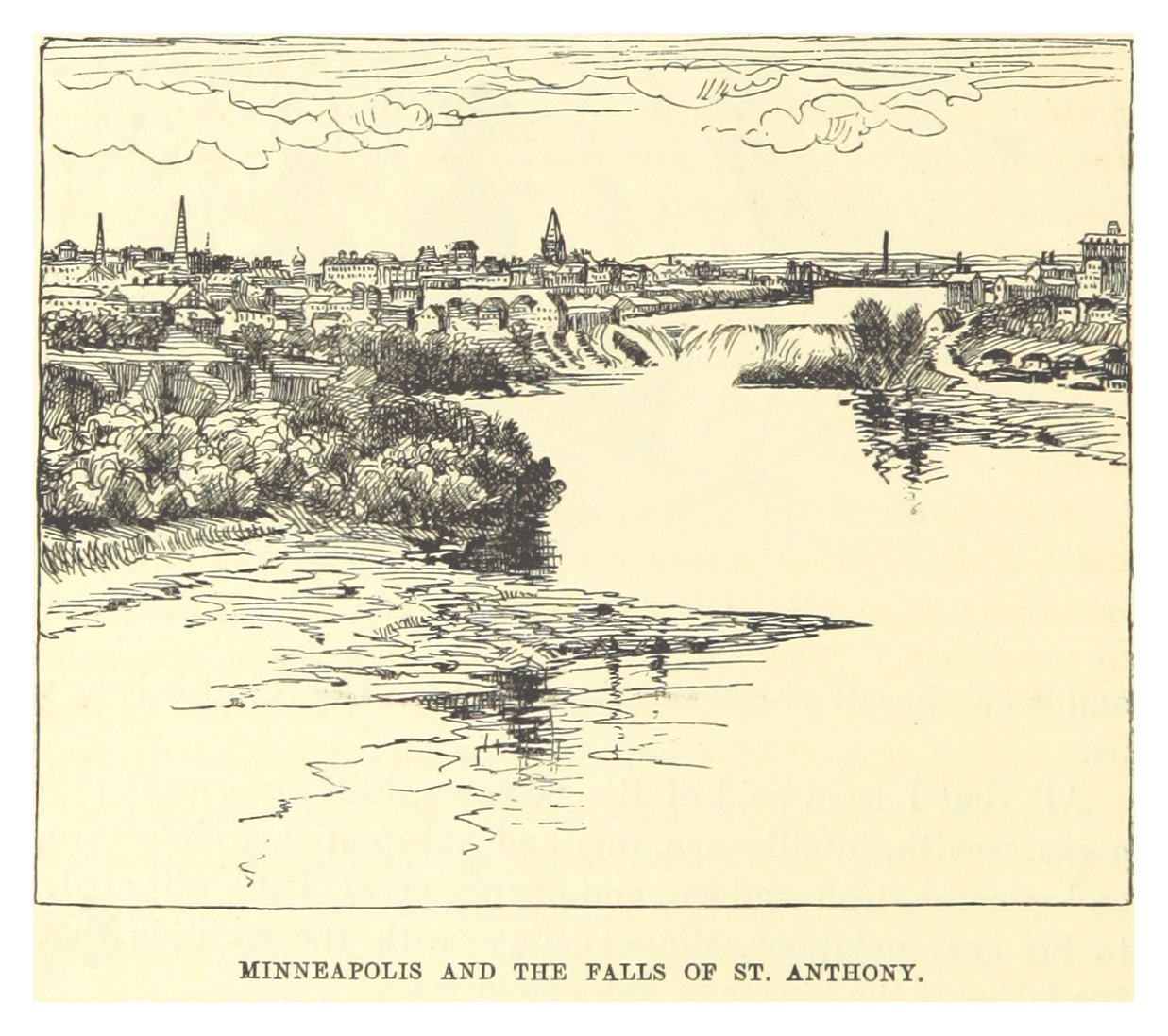
Minneapolis and the Falls of Saint Anthony, an illustration from Mark Twain's 1883 memoir Life on the Mississippi.

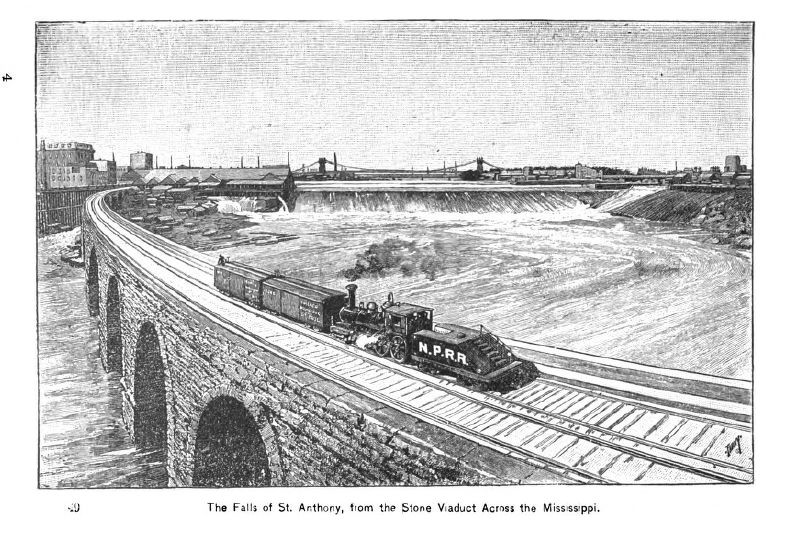
An illustration of the falls and Stone Arch Bridge from the 1893 book The Official Northern Pacific Railroad Guide

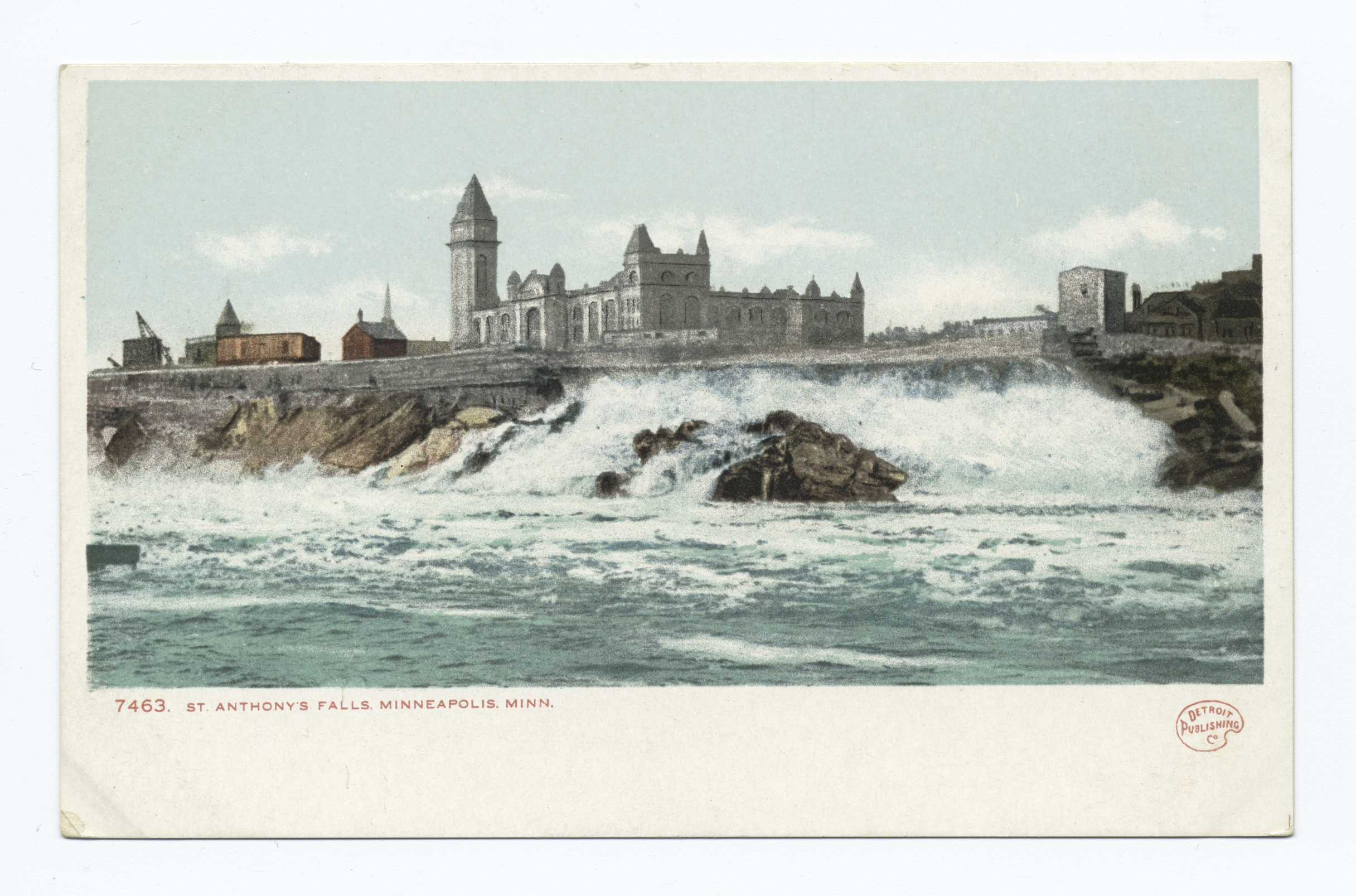
A postcard printed by the Detroit Publishing Company, c. 1903–04

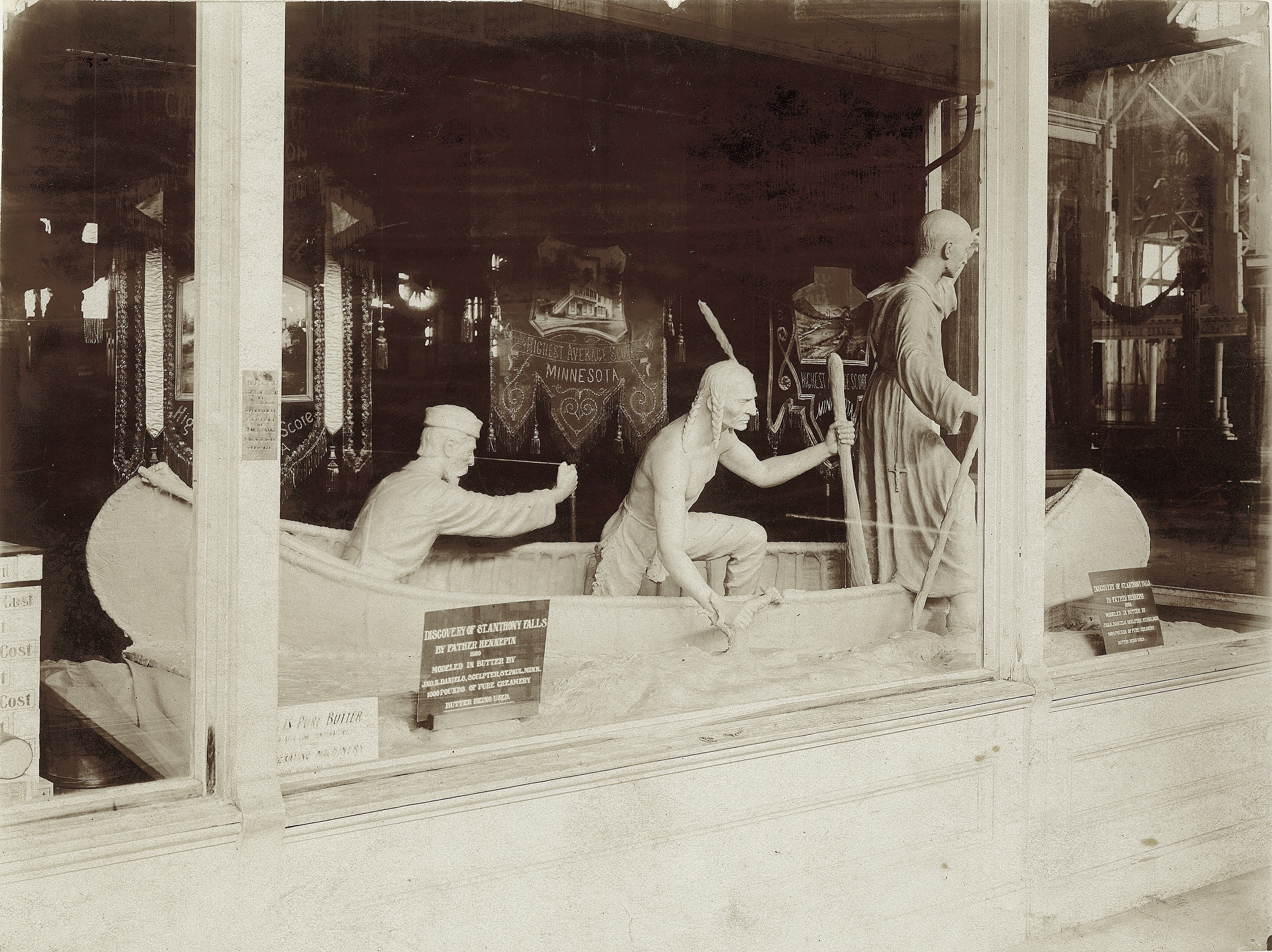
Discovery of St. Anthony Falls, a butter sculpture on display at the 1904 World's Fair in St. Louis, Missouri.

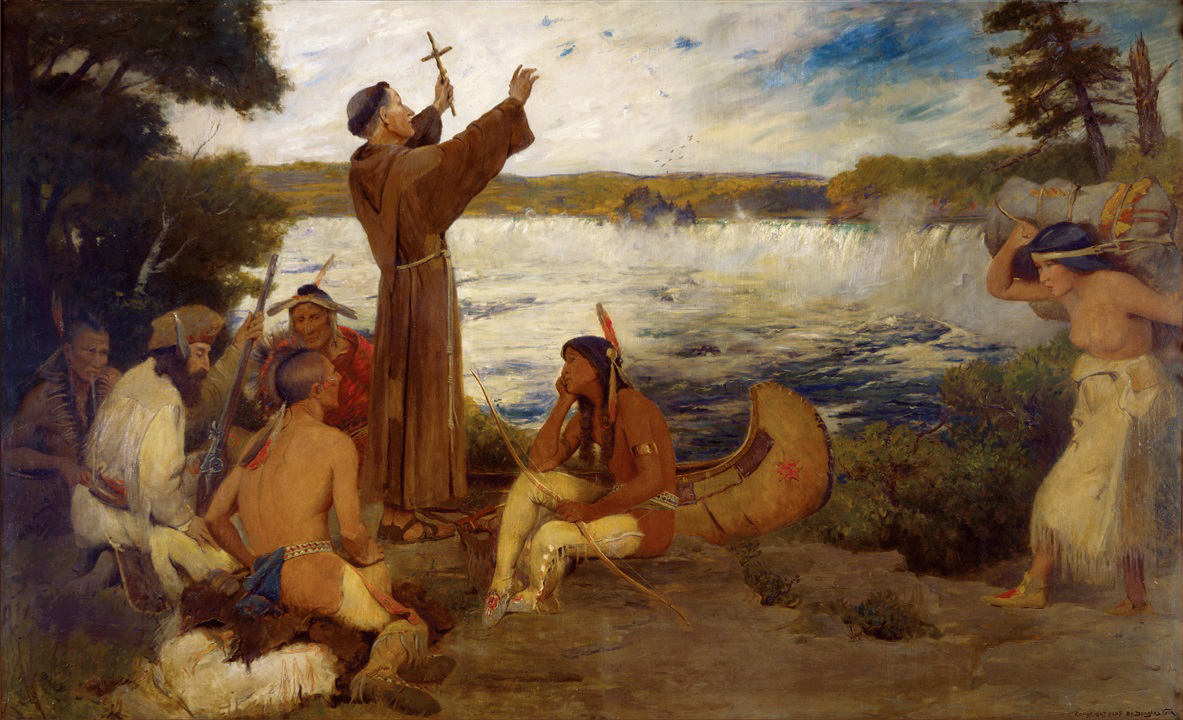
Douglas Volk, Father Hennepin Discovering the Falls of St. Anthony, c. 1905. Minnesota State Capitol.

== See also ==
- List of waterfalls
- I-35W Mississippi River bridge, collapsed in 2007
- Saint Anthony Main shopping area

== References cited ==
- Coddington, Donn; Hess, Jeffrey. "Nomination of the St. Anthony Falls Historic District to be on the National Register of Historic Places". (1971, 1991). US-DOI-NPS.

The application from the City of Minneapolis to the National Park Service to place the St. Anthony Falls Historic District on the National Register of Historic Places (it was placed there). Consists of the original 1971 section and a much longer 1991 addition. Has extensive information on the significance of the district and descriptions of "contributing resources".

- Kane, Lucile (1987). The Falls of St. Anthony: The Waterfall That Built Minneapolis. Minnesota Historical Society.

A heavily footnoted standard history of the development at the Falls.

- Anfinson, John; et al. (2003). "River of History: A Historic Resources Study of the Mississippi" (PDF). NPS. COE & NPS - National River and Recreation Area. Archived from the original (PDF) on February 22, 2017.
- Danbom, David. "Flour Power – the significance of flour milling at the falls" (PDF). Minnesota History (Spring/Summer 2003). Archived from the original (PDF) on November 1, 2013.
- * "Feasibility Report for Hydropower St. Anthony Falls". Corps of Engineers. 1984. pp. 37, 138–140. Archived from the original on April 19, 2019.
