= St. Anthony Falls Historic District =

Area of Minneapolis, Minnesota, US

- U.S. National Register of Historic Places
- U.S. Historic district
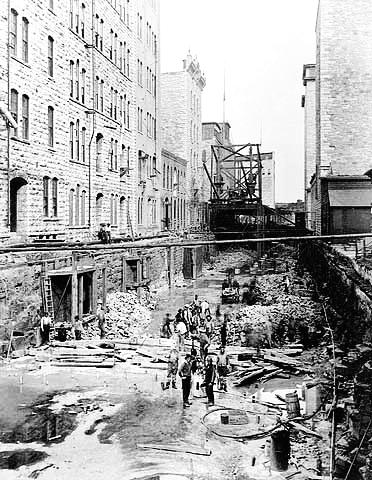
- Power Canal being made deeper with concentrated mills on both sides 1885 (Minnesota Historical Society)

- Location within Minnesota
- Location: Minneapolis, Minnesota
- Coordinates: 44°58′54″N 93°15′31″W
- Engineer: Significant; William de la Barre
- NRHP reference No.: 71000438
- Added to NRHP: March 11, 1971; Addition 1991

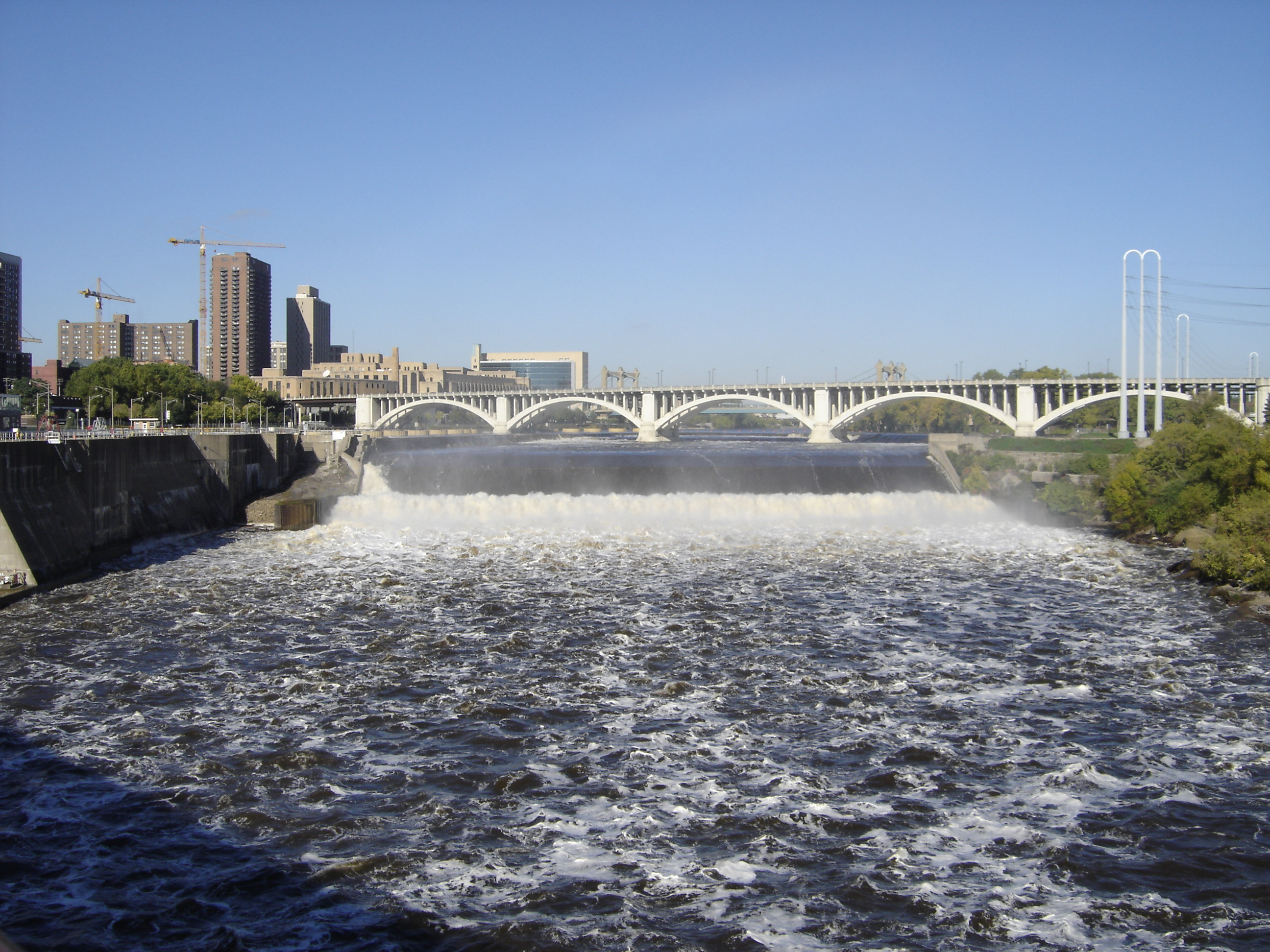
Saint Anthony Falls looking upstream

The following are all the contributing resources to the Saint Anthony Falls Historic District in Minneapolis, Minnesota, United States. The District is listed on the National Register of Historic Places, thus these properties are on the NRHP. The "period of significance" of the District was 1858–1941. The district's archaeological record is considered to be one of the most-endangered historic sites in Minnesota.

== The Historic District ==
The City Beautiful idea of progress was to replace old buildings with grander new buildings (like the Minneapolis Post Office, the Great Northern Railroad Depot (1912-1978) and the Pillsbury Library). The Gateway clearance in downtown Minneapolis tore down the now revered Metropolitan Building in 1961. That raised thoughts of historic preservation (thoughts that didn't include the industrial falls area).

By then on the west bank most of the flour mills had been torn down, with gravel storage on many of the sites. Waterpower use ended 1960. A few mills operated into the 1960s, with the end of milling, at the Washburn A mill about 1965. In 1969 four of the former flour mills remained standing. For all the historic buildings, use became abandonment, warehousing, light industry, or in one case animal rendering. Second St. had railroad tracks.

On the east bank the mighty Pillsbury A mill ended waterpower use 1955, had limited specialty flour milling after 1975, and ended milling in 2003. Three of the four Main Street historic buildings went from commercial to industrial to empty or storage.

The National Historic Preservation Act of 1966 promoted historic preservation and created the National Register of Historic Places. Minneapolis created the St. Anthony Falls Historic District, and it was added to the NRHP in 1971. The original filing included 21 existing structures. Minneapolis had decided the riverfront and its history was an amenity that could attract people.

In 1980, the Minneapolis Park Board proposed extending the West River Parkway from Plymouth Ave. through the mill district. That triggered a section 106 review. The review found numerous archaeological remains in the mill area, particularly under gravel piles on the river side of the power canal. Remains were also found between the falls and Plymouth Ave.

A great deal of public money has been spent in the Historic District, both on public entities, like the Mill City Museum and Mill Ruins Park, but also (including tax credits) on private redevelopment of historic structures.

A lot was learned about the Historic District, and the NRHP nomination was amended in 1991 with much more narrative on the significance plus over four times the entities. A lot of the additions were the archeological remains and the individual houses on Nicollet Island.

Note that from the falls downstream the river flows substantially to the south east. In this article "south" will mean downstream and "east" is toward the east bank. (In some other sources "east" is downstream.)

== Extant ==
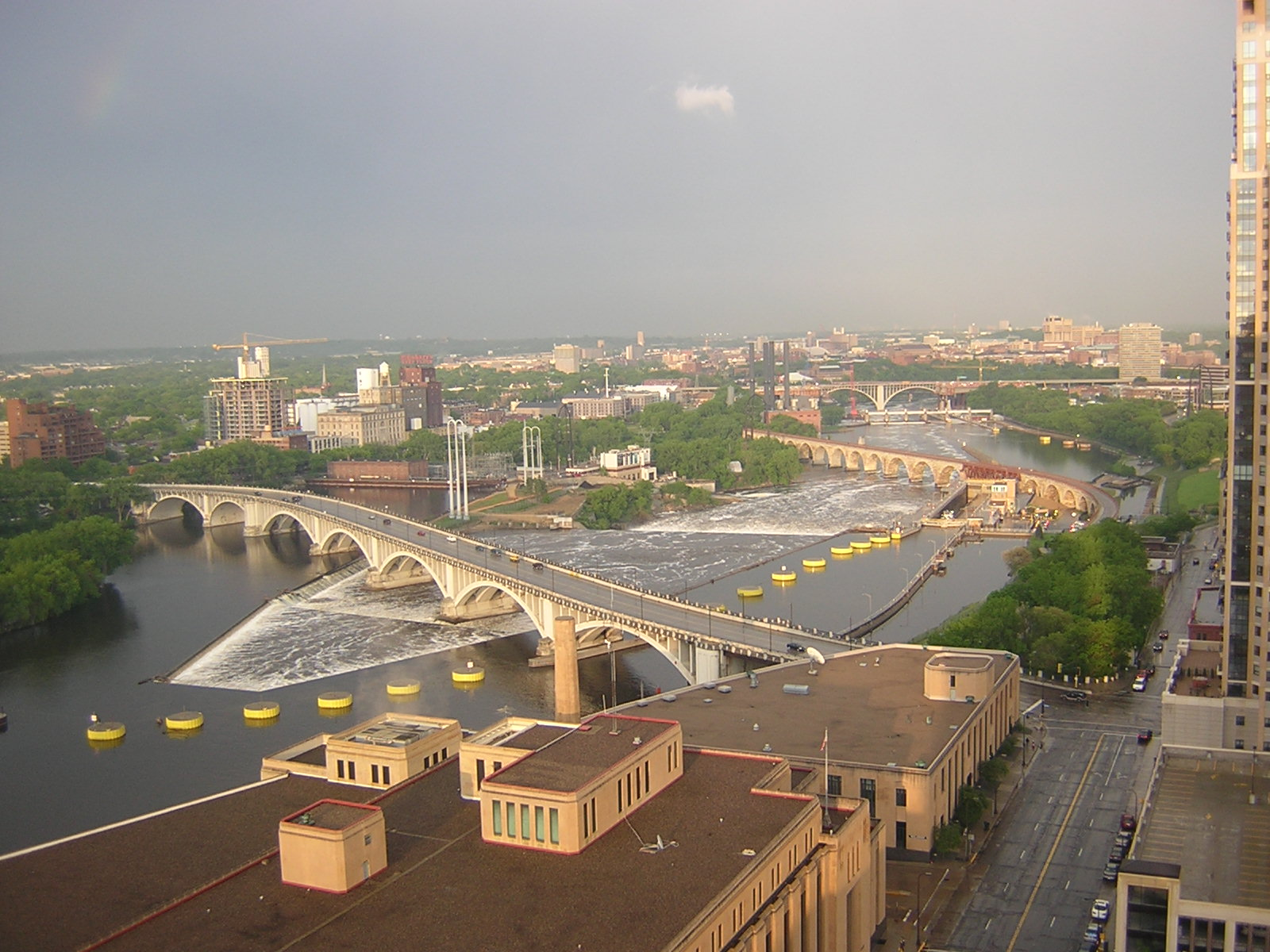
Saint Anthony Falls looking downstream, upper dam at left

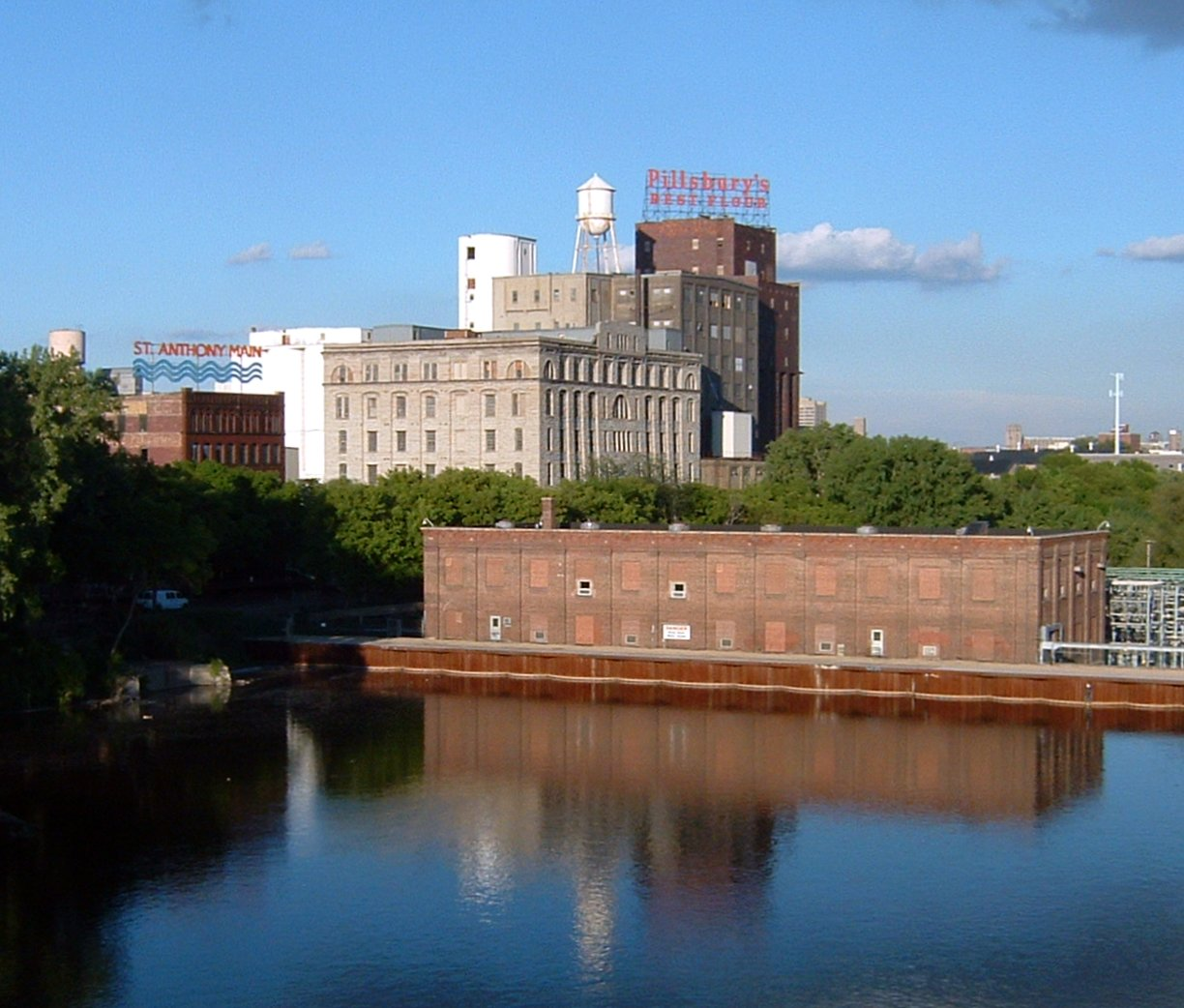
Pillsbury "A" Mill and 1911 Main Street Station

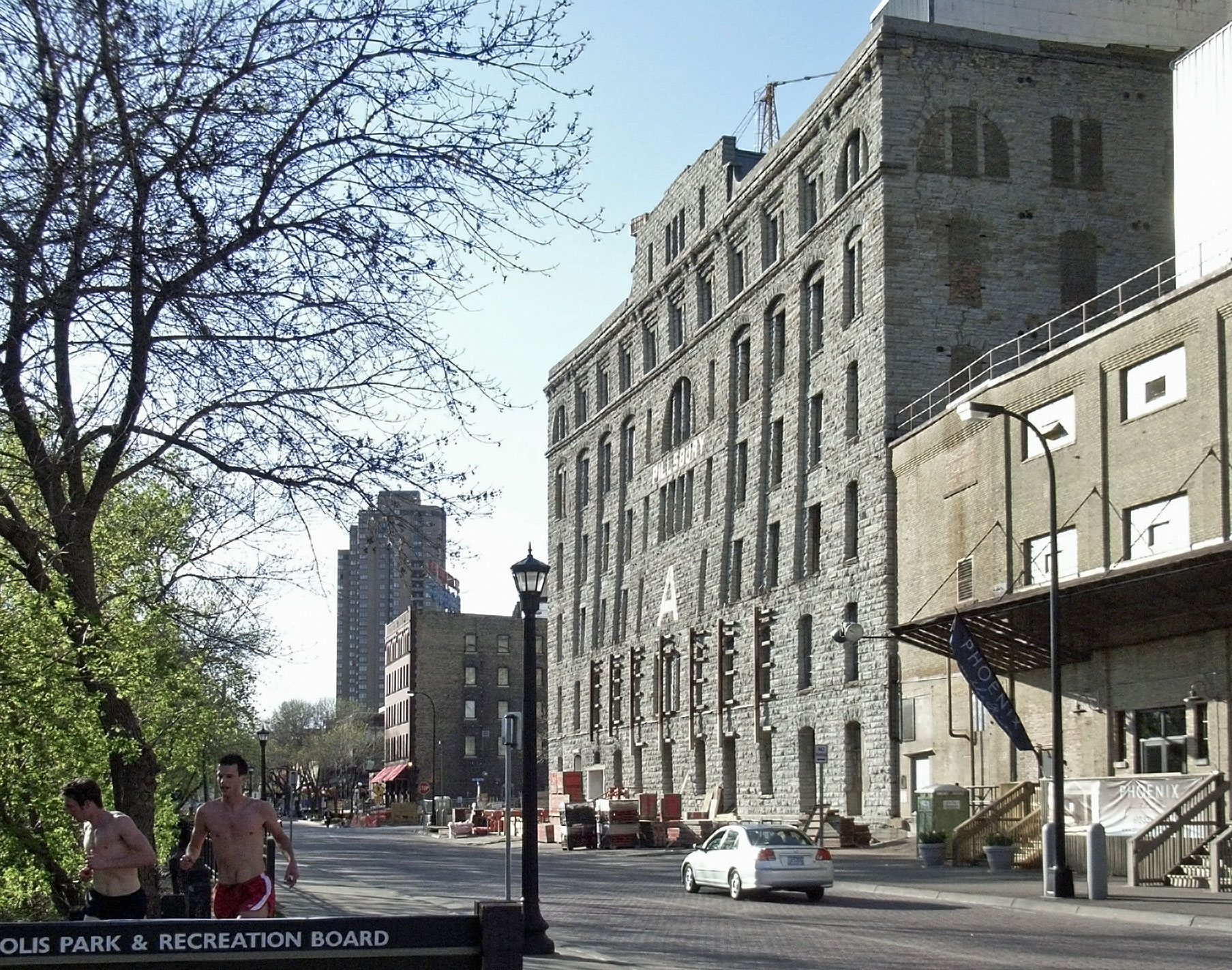
Pillsbury "A" Mill

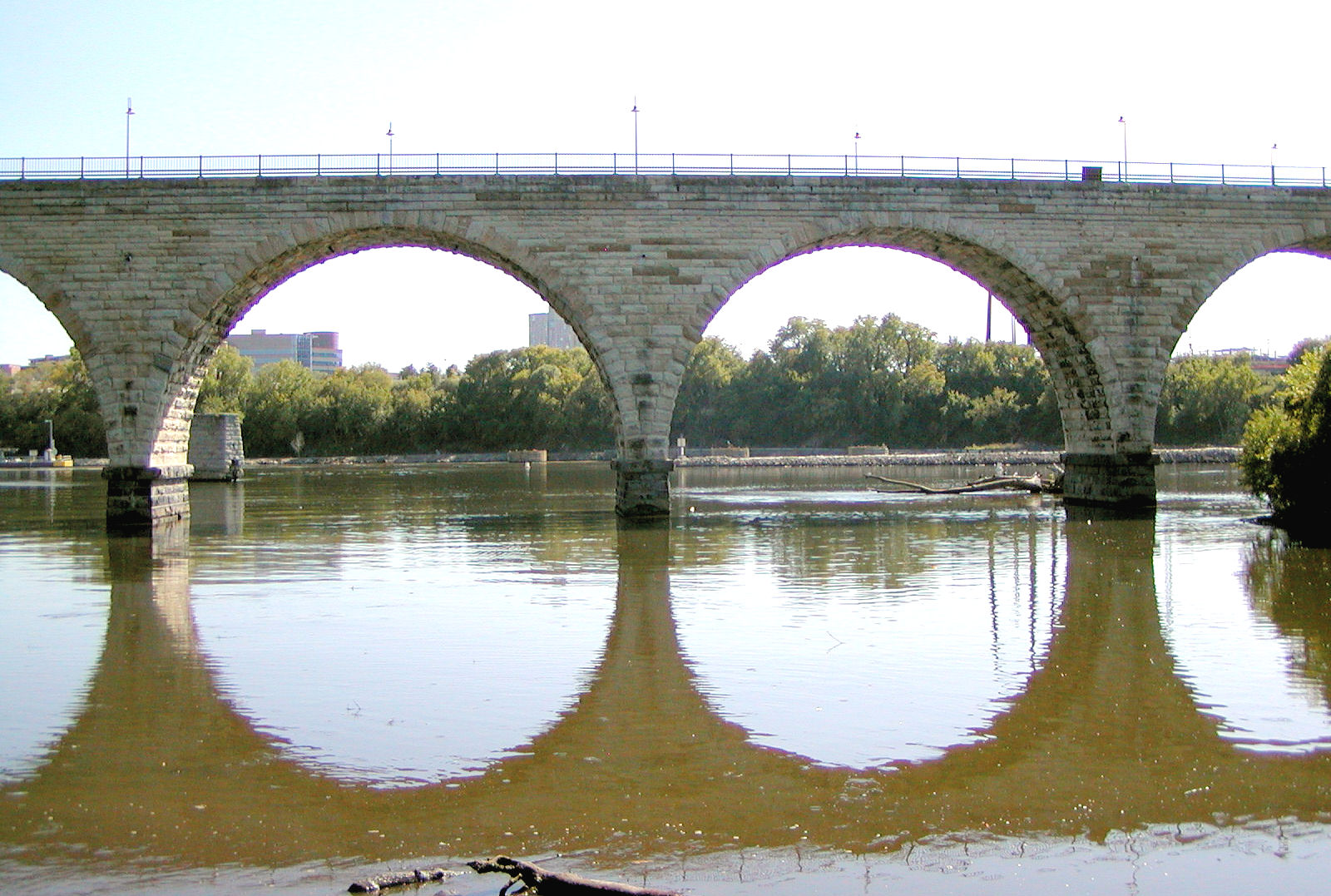
Stone Arch Bridge

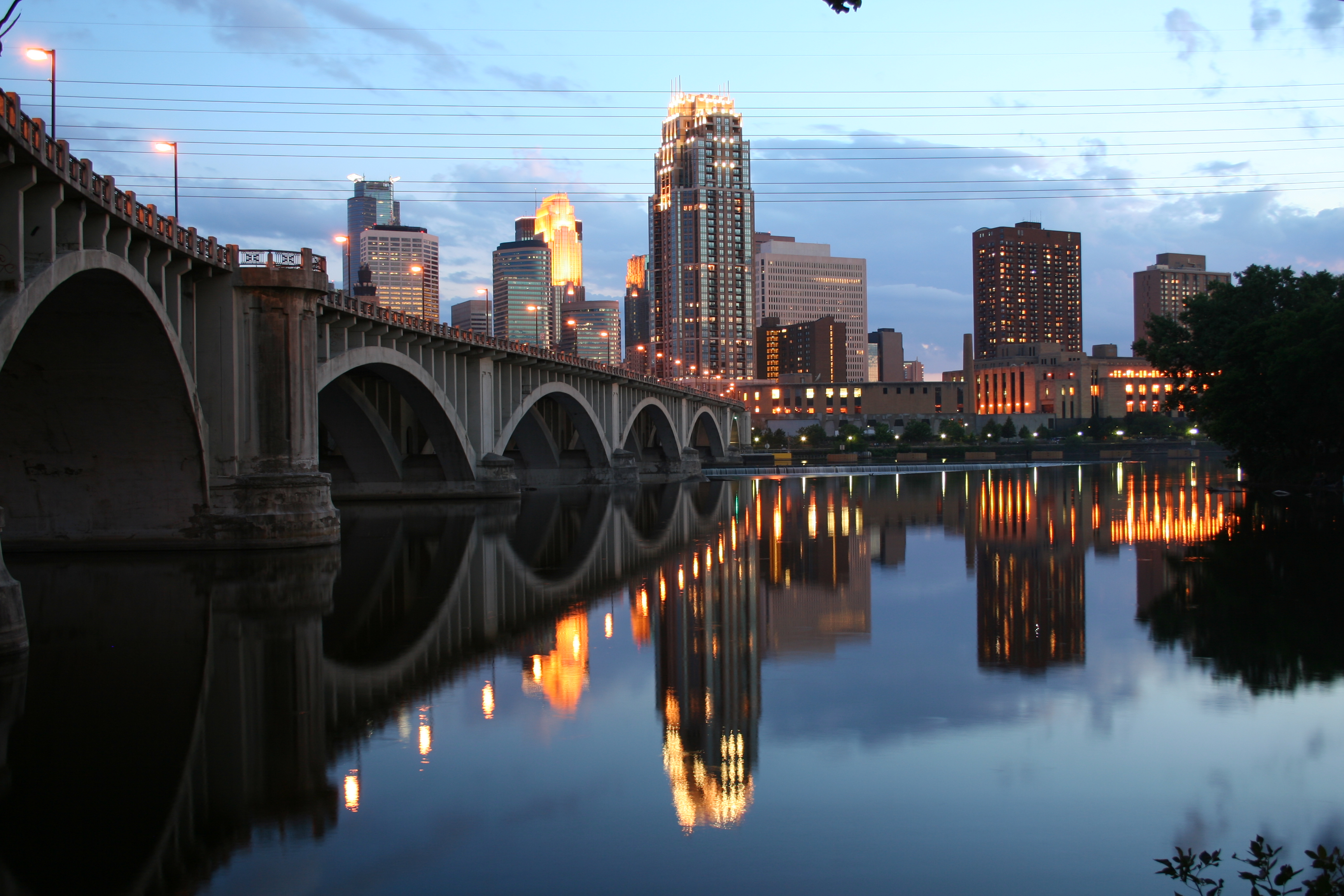
Third Avenue Bridge

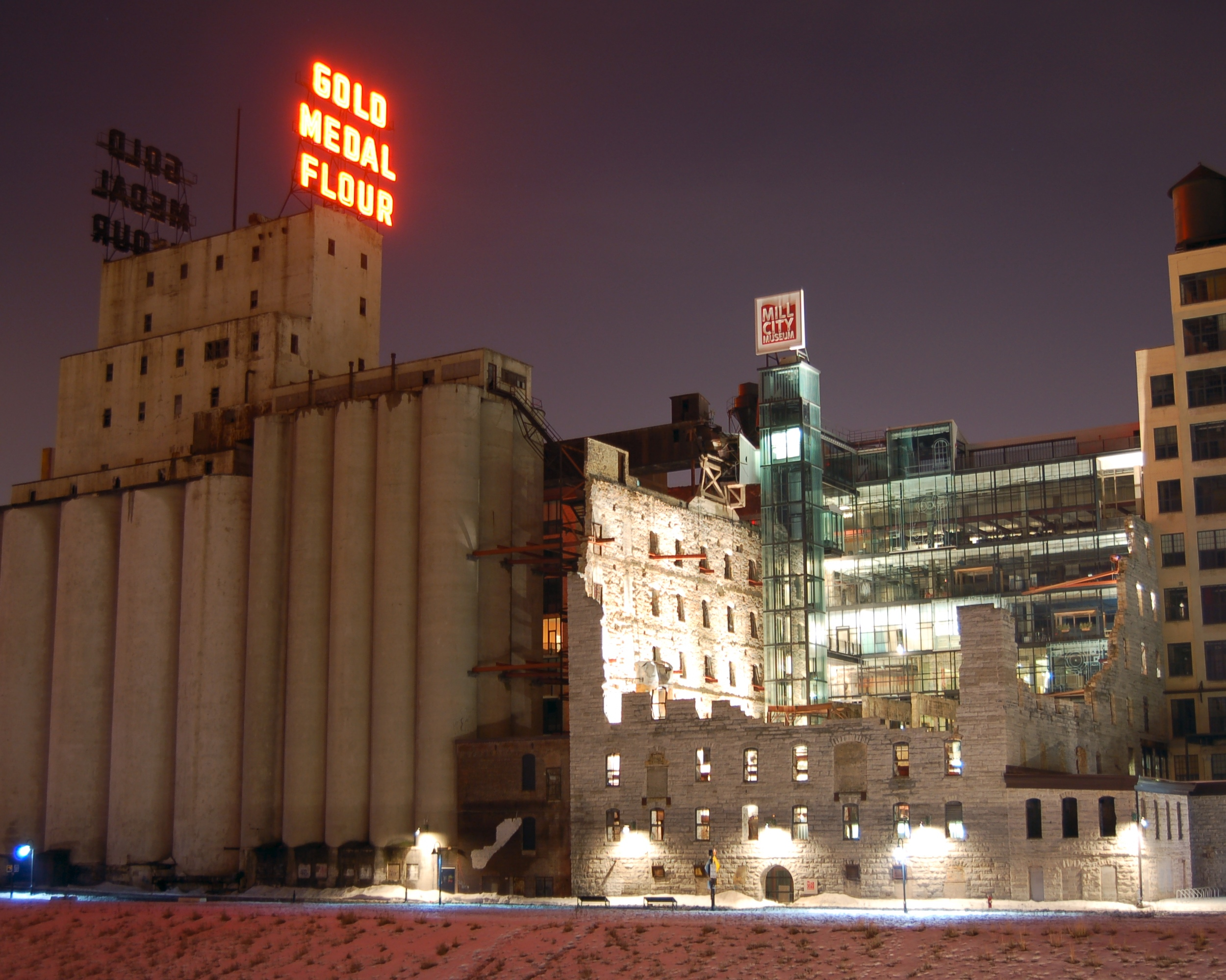
Washburn "A" Mill (right)

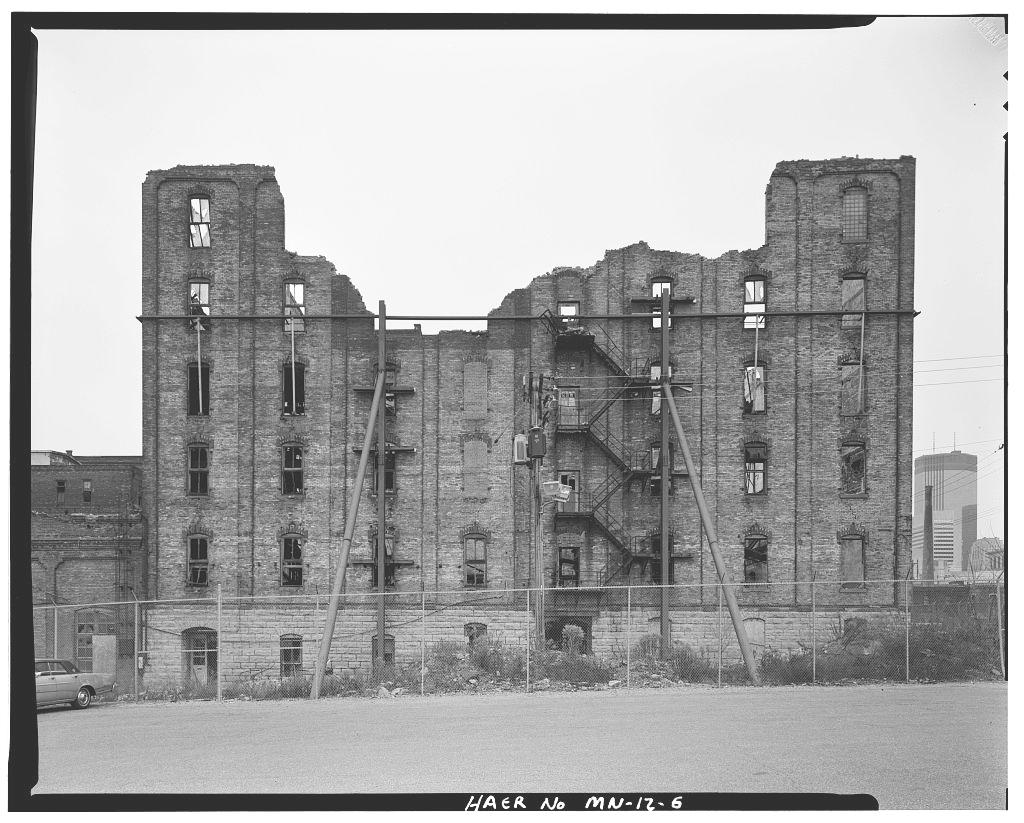
Crown Roller Mill after 1983 fire (HAER 1985)

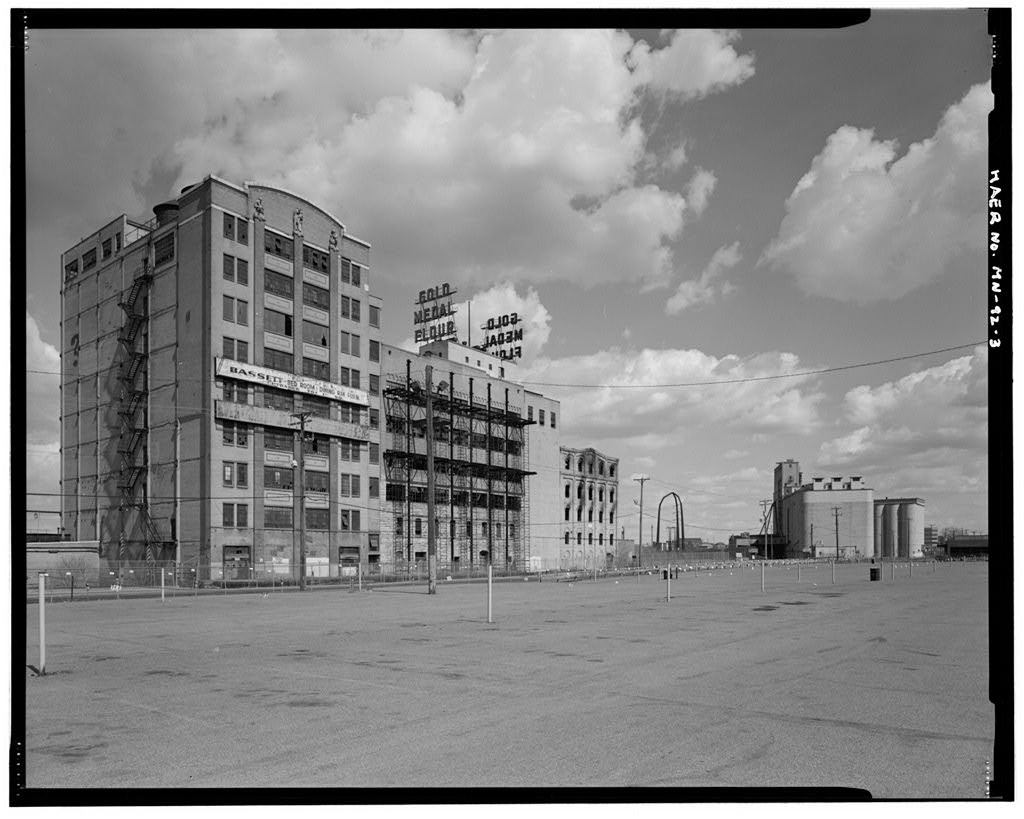
Washburn A mill complex looking compass east (1997). From left Utility Building, Washburn A Mill (with scaffolding), Wheat House, Humboldt Mill, at top - head house over Elevator 1 with Gold Medal Flour signs, far right Elevator 2 & 3 (now razed) (HAER)

=== St. Anthony Falls Waterpower Area ===
Use of waterpower at the falls goes back to an 1821 sawmill and an 1823 grist mill, both built by Ft. Snelling. As soon as the area was opened up to white settlement. the land was claimed to get the waterpower rights. The falls was a major saw mill center, then from 1880 to 1930 had the largest flour production in the US. In 1881 the third central station hydroelectric plant in the US was built (for arc lights). Two major hydroelectric plants were built (1894/1911 and 1908) with a third plant (1895) just downstream. One of these plants is still operating. Other industries have also been powered by the falls. Minneapolis developed around these industries. A major part of the District is the remains of these industries (some literally archeological remains).

- Bridge No. L-8900, crosses S 1st. St., E of 3rd Ave. S. [1891- ]
- Crown Roller Mill/Consolidated "A" mill, 105 5th Ave. S. [1880,1908- ]

The Crown Roller Mill had the third highest flour production at the Falls. It was the first large mill that used gradual-reduction roller milling and middlings purifiers. Production ended 1953 and the building was used for warehouse and light industry. A disastrous 1983 fire destroyed the interior, the roof, and part of one wall. A new interior was built in the shell and a mansard roof restored. The renovation substantially restored the appearance and the building is still a contributing resource. The mill and attached boiler house are now an office building.

- Falls of St. Anthony
- Falls of St. Anthony Apron [1866, 1880. 1952- ]

Originally a wood timber sloping spillway for the river, the apron protected the falls and stopped the upstream progression and, when originally built, prevented damage from logs that escaped from the then prevalent sawmills. The wood apron was replaced with a concrete one in 1952 and is the very visible spillway.

- Falls of St. Anthony Dike [1876- ]

A concrete wall across the river under he limestone cap to fix the Eastman tunnel disaster.

- Falls of St. Anthony Dam (Horseshoe/upper dam) [1858- ]
- Falls of St. Anthony, East Channel Escarpment Hennepin Island E of access road extension of 3rd Ave SE

Location of the waterfall in the east channel (now blocked) of the river around Hennepin Island. It is the only exposed instance of the original falls.

- Hall and Dann Barrel Company Factory, 111 3rd Ave. S. [1880,1888- ]
- Hennepin Island Hydroelectric Plant, central Hennepin Island [1908- ]
- Humboldt Flour Mill/Washburn "E" Mill, 710-714 S. 2nd S. [1878- ] (now historic part of Humboldt Lofts Condos)
- Log Sluice, E side of Main Street Station to escarpment [1898- ]
- Main Street Hydroelectric Station, 206 Main St. SE [1911- ]
- Martin and Morrison Block, 127-129 Main St. SE [1858- ]
- Minneapolis Eastern Railway Company Engine House, 333 S. 1st St. [1914- ]
- North Star Woolen Mill, 109 Portland Ave. [1885, 1922, 1925- ] (now North Star Lofts)
- Northwestern Consolidated Milling Company Elevator A (Ceresota Elevator), 155 5th Ave S. [1908- ] (now Millers Landing Senior Living)
- Pillsbury "A" Mill Complex, 301 Main St. SE. [1881- ]

The A-mill and four adjacent buildings in the complex were redeveloped into the income limited A-mill Artist Lofts (2015). The Concrete Elevator on 2nd St. SE is also part of the complex.

- Pillsbury "A" Mill Transformer Building, Hennepin Island W of the substation [1918- ]

There does not appear to be a building as described at the location described.

- Pillsbury Industrial Equipment/Pillsbury Machine Shop, 300 Second St. SE [1916- ] (now an event venue, cocktail lounge 2016)
- Pillsbury Warehouse #2, 129 Fifth Ave. SE [1919- ]

Part of the 2015 redevelopment to the income limited A-mill Artist Lofts

- Pracna Building, 117 Main St. SE [1890- ]

Built in 1890 as a saloon and closed 1919 (prohibition). It was a machine shop when architect Peter Nelson Hall bought it in 1968 when the area was run down, and redlined for mortgages. Nelson lived on the upper floors and in 1973 opened a restaurant and bar, Pracna on Main - the initial revival of the east bank.

- Salisbury & Satterlee Company Complex, 201–205; 219 Main St. SE [1885, 1892, 1906, 1909- ]
- St. Anthony Falls Hydraulic Laboratory, on Hennepin Island [1938- ]
- St. Anthony Falls Water Power Co. Canal/Pillsbury Canal, from a gate house at 2nd Ave SE and the river then under Main St. to the mid west wall of the Pillsbury A mill. [1881- ]

The tunnel (it was never a canal) was the headrace for the Pillsbury "A" mill turbines (also the Phoenix mill). As part of the redevelopment of the A-mill complex into income limited A-Mill Artist Lofts a penstock pipe was added to the tunnel to supply a new hydroelectric generator in the downstream turbine pit.

- St. Anthony Falls Water Power Co. Tailrace/Chute Tunnel, under Main St. SE, from about 3rd Ave to 5th Ave SE [1864, 1874- ]

The St. Anthony Water Power Company planned to build a headrace canal similar to the west bank Power Canal (1858), and a lower tailrace tunnel - both under Main St. SE. The tailrace construction started 1864 near the foot of 5th Ave. SE and went back to Main St. then upstream under Main St. The tunnel hit a previously unknown cave, now called Chute's Cave, and the project was abandoned. Pettigill's Amusement Resort operated on top of the bluff from 1875 until 1880 and offered tourist boat trips into Chute's Cave (tunnel).
Work restarted 1874 on a tailrace for the Phoenix Mill at 3rd St SE and Main, then downstream under Main St. to just before the walled-off cave and out to the bluff. The tailrace was used by the Phoenix until it closed in 1956.
Chute's Cave ( not a contributing resource) is an oval about 100 ft. by 200 ft. under Main St. It is just downstream from the Pillsbury A Mill tailraces. The cave is in sandstone with a limestone roof. The center of the cave has break-down from when the limestone failed 1880, leaving a large hole in Main St.
The cave and tunnels still exist. The cave is accessible, but not easily. The entrance to the original tunnel at the bluff is closed but the tunnel can be accessed from the cave. The tunnel has increasingly deep mud away from the cave. The cave and Phoenix tunnel are bat hibernaculum

- Standard Flour Mill/Northwestern Consolidated "F" mill, 150 Portland Ave. [1879- ] (Whitney Hotel 1987-2003, now Whitney Lofts 2007)
- Stone Arch Bridge [1883- ]
- Upton Block/Union Iron Works, Main St. & 2nd Ave SE [1855- ] (now Aster Cafe)
- Washburn, Crosby & Company "A" Flour Mill (Washburn "A" Mill Complex), 701 1st St S [1880+- ]

The A-mill complex had many buildings, most of which became the Mill City Museum. The complex also includes:
- Washburn-Crosby No. 1 Elevator [1908- ] 15 (3x5) large diameter circular elevators on the south east corner of the complex with " Gold Medal Flour" signs on top; the elevators were among the first to use the circular reinforced-concrete form pioneered by Peavey–Haglin (1900)
- Utility Building, 700 2nd St S, [1914- ] a completely separate building that housed flour packaging operations plus, at times, Betty Crocker's kitchen and studios for the Washburn- Crosby CO radio station (now Washburn Lofts)
- Washburn-Crosby Feed Elevator [1928- ] 15 (3x5) smaller diameter circular elevators north of Elevator No. 1

- Washburn-Crosby Company Train Shed, 700 Block of 1st St. S. [1918- ] (now part of the Mill City Museum)

=== Nicollet Island Residential Area ===
The upstream end of Nicollet Island had historic houses of varying architectural styles, and developed as a predominantly middle and working class neighborhood. Plans for redeveloping Nicollet Island were to demolish the houses for a park. The Minneapolis Housing and Redevelopment agency started buying properties in 1968. Residents wanted the houses to remain. In an epic struggle the residents won in 1983.

- Adams-Barquist House, 177 Nicollet St.
- Andrew and Ole Loberg House, 171 E. Island Ave.
- Andrew and Ole Loberg House, 175 E. Island Ave.
- Backe-Barquist House, 91 Nicollet St.
- Baker-Leber House, 95 W. Island Ave.
- Barquist-Holmberg House, 167-169 Nicollet St.
- Brookins, George, W., House, 163 Nicollet St.
- Griswold, Franklin G., House, 15-17 Maple Pl.
- Griswold, Franklin, G., House, 107-109 W. Island Ave.
- Grove St. Flats (Eastman Flats), 2-16 Grove St. [1877- ]
- house, 27 Maple Pl.
- house, 18-20 Maple Pl.
- John Mayell House (also listed as "Mayall, John, House"), 93 Nicollet St.
- Meader-Farnham House, 103-105 W. Island Ave.
- Murphy, Edward, House, 167-169 E. Island Ave.
- O'Brien-Meyer House, 185-186 E. Island Ave.
- Pease, R.M.S, House, 101 W. Island Ave.
- Pye, James, House, 163 E. Island Ave.
- William D. Burnett Tenement, 111-113 W. Island Ave.
- Woodward Flat Duplex, 183-184 E. Island Ave.
- Woodward Flat Fourplex, 187-190 E. Island Ave.

=== Extant - Other ===
- Ard Godfrey House, Ortman St (Chute Square) [1849- ]

The Ard Godfrey house, built for Godfrey in 1848, is the oldest remaining frame house in the Twin Cities. Godfrey came to St. Anthony as the first millwright to build the first commercial sawmill at the falls for Franklin Steele. Godfrey and family lived in the house from 1849 to 1853. The house, originally built approximately behind what is now Pracna, has been moved 4 times to preserve it and at its present location on Chute Square has been extensively restored. It has been a museum open for tours. From St. Anthony Falls, in 1853 Godfrey established a dam and saw mill, then gristmill in the lower glen between Minnehaha falls and the river.

- Island Sash and Door Factory, 95 Merriam Street [1893- ] (now Nicollet Island Inn)
- Lucy Wilder Morris Park, 6th St SE and river bank
- Minneapolis Post Office - Main Station, 201 1st St. S [1932- ]
- Old Main Street (Main St. SE)
- Our Lady of Lourdes Catholic Church, 21 SE Prince Street [1858- ]
- Pillsbury Public Library, 100 University Ave. SE [1904- ]
- Third Avenue Bridge [1917- ]

== Razed (but with archeological remains) ==
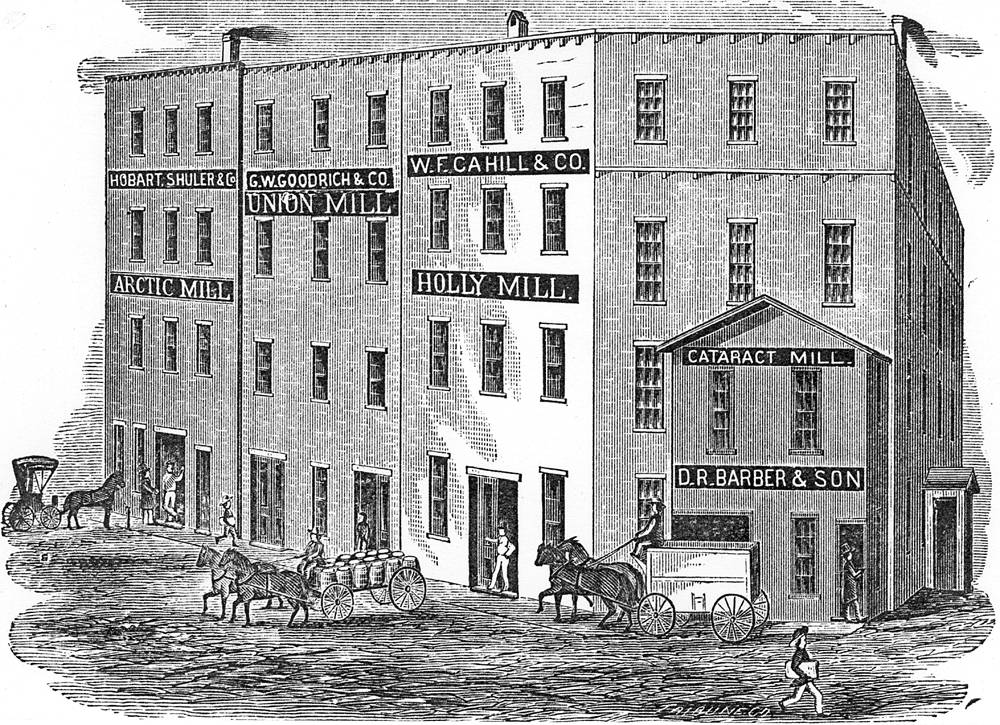
Arctic, Union, Holly and Cataract flour mills

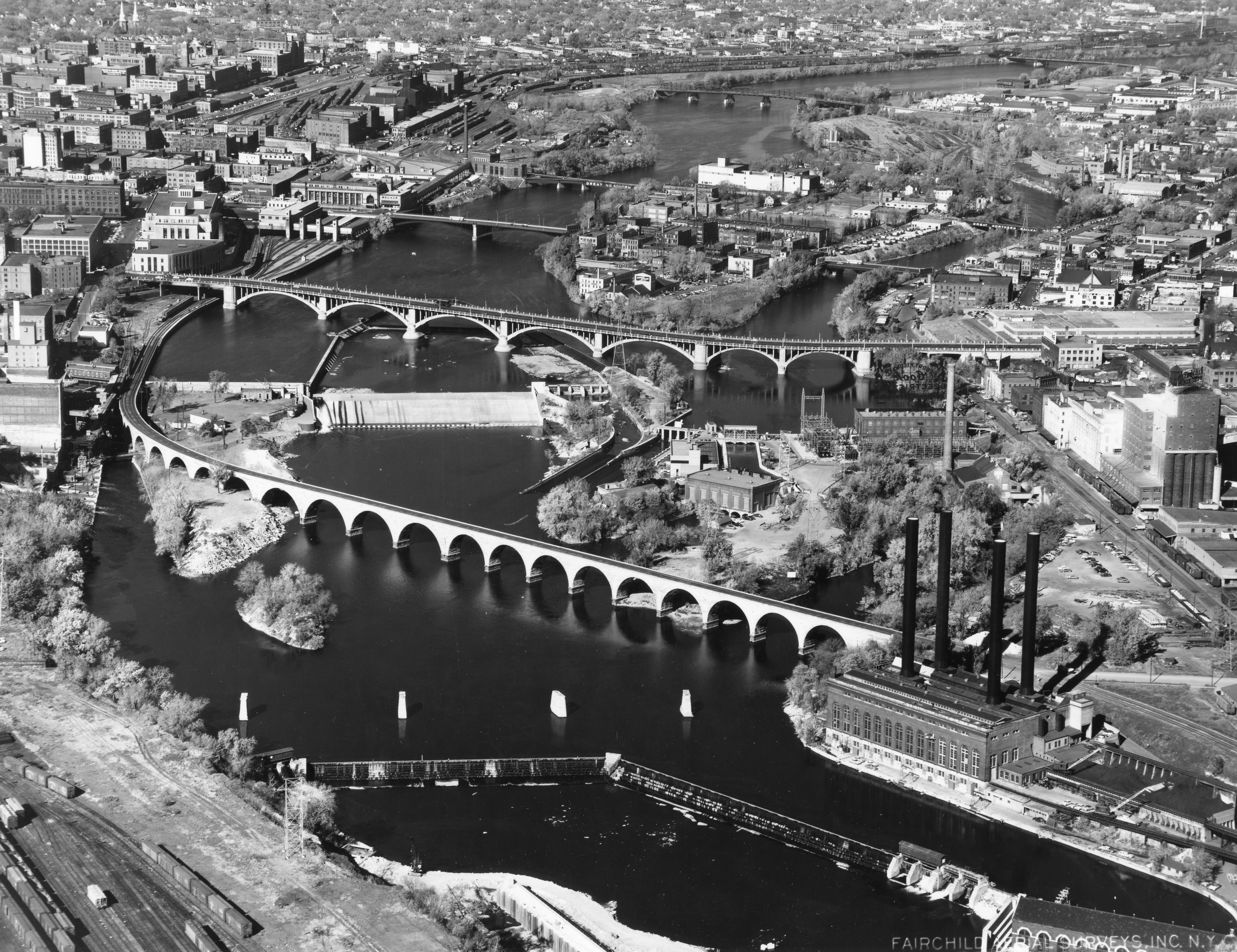
Center - St.Anthony Falls; to left - dam where lock will be built (1963); to left - small building is Power Canal Gatehouse (1858-1960); right - single tall stack is Pillsbury "A" Steam Power Plant (1903-1964); Stone Arch Bridge (1883) feeds Great Northern Depot (1913-1978) above Hennepin Ave. Bridge; bottom Lower Dam Hydroelectric Plant (1895-1988) & Lower Dam (1895-1956), above it - 4 piers from 10th Ave. S bridge (one remains), right -Southeast Steam Plant (1903); center - Hennepin Island Hydroelectric Plant (1908) ca 1955 (City of Minneapolis Archives)

=== Associated with the West Bank Power Canal ===
The falls was the leading US flour milling center from 1880 to 1930. In the following decline many of the west bank mills were demolished in the 1930s. Into the 1960s most of the rest of the west bank mills were demolished or abandoned. Mills were demolished to the ground surface, leaving foundations, drop shafts, tailraces, headraces and sometimes turbines intact. Abandonment of the riverfront meant those remains were not destroyed by new development. Many of these sites are part of the Mill Ruins Park.

- Alaska Flour Mill/Pillsbury "B" Flour Mill [1866, 1882-1931]
- Anchor Flour Mill [1874-1937]
- Arctic Flour Mill/St. Anthony Flour Mill/Northwestern Consolidated "H" Mill [1866- ~1920]
- Cataract Flour Mill [1859-1928]
- Clapp Woolen Mill/Empire Mill/Pillsbury "B" Elevator [1865, 1888-1969]
- Columbia Flour Mill/Northwestern Consolidated "B" Mill [1882-1940s]
- First Bassett Sawmill/Second City Waterworks/Northwestern Consolidated - storage [1866. 1871-1930s]
- First City Waterworks/Holly Flour Mill [1867- ~1920]
- Galaxy Flour Mill/Northwestern Consolidated "C" Mill [1874, 1875, 1879-1931]
- Minneapolis and St. Louis Railroad Wheelhouse [1878- ~1960]
- Minneapolis Cotton Mill/Excelsior Flour Mill [1870-1900s]
- Minneapolis Eastern Railroad Trestle Piers [1890-1962]
- Minneapolis Flour Mill/Washburn Crosby "D" Mill [1865, 1881-1931]
- Minneapolis Mill Co. Gatehouse & Power Canal [1858, 1867, 1885-1960]
- Minneapolis Paper Mill/Pillsbury Warehouse "C" [1867-1931]
- Northwestern Flour Mill/Northwestern Consolidated"D" Mill [1879-1931]
- Occidental Feed Mill [1883-1919]
- Palisade Flour Mill [1872-1932]
- People's Flour Mill [1857-1870s]
- Pettit Mill/Northwestern Consolidated Elevator "B" [1875, 1879-1931]
- Russell Mill/Dakota Mill/King Midas Flour Mill [1868-1967]
- Russell's Planing Mill/Model Mill/King Midas Flour Mill [1863-1967]
- Second Bassett Sawmill [1870-1940s]
- Union Flour Mill/_Northwestern Consolidated storage [1863- ~1930]
- Washburn "B" Flour Mill Complex [1866-1931]
- Washburn "C" Flour Mill Complex [1878-1960]
- Washburn-Crosby Company Elevator No. 2 [1916-1998]

Elevators No. 2 & 3 were large grain elevators south of the Washburn A mill complex. They were separated from the complex by railroad tracks and connected by a conveyor tunnel. Elevator 2 (1916) was just north of 10th Ave S, and elevator 3 (1929) was just south (outside the Historic District). They accepted grain from rail box cars or trucks (1958) and fed the mills. When milling ended in 1965 the elevators were used for storage, with grain coming in by truck (or rail) and shipped out by rail or river barge (1969). Minneapolis bought the elevators in 1987 and General Mills (Washburn-Crosby) continued to use the elevators until 1993, when use ended and the elevators stood vacant. The end of the once heavy rail use at the falls facilitated redevelopment. The elevators were demolished 1998, and likely nothing remains. Gold Medal Park now occupies the site.

- Zenith Flour Mill/_Northwestern Consolidated "E" Mill [1871, 1878, 1879-1931]

=== Razed - Other ===
- Bridge No. L-9331, across Tenth Ave S, farthest east of 2nd St S. [1916-?] (now the Gold Medal Park)
- Bridge No. L-9332, across Tenth Ave S, further east of 2nd St S. [1916-?] (now the Gold Medal Park)
- Bridge No. L-9333, across Tenth Ave S, immediately east of 2nd St S. [1892-?] (now the Gold Medal Park)
- Chicago, St. Paul, Minneapolis and Omaha RR Roundhouse, 6th Ave N & W River Parkway [~1891-?]
- Eastman tunnel [1868-1869]
- Gateway Residential Area, along West River Parkway between Hennepin Ave and 3rd Ave S. (ca. 1862-1883)

A mostly residential area developed on the lower terrace next to the river (West River Parkway) from Hennepin Ave. to 3rd Ave. Most of this area was part of John H. Stevens' homestead and included his house. Residents had to move in 1883 because of railroad incursion. The Stone Arch Bridge (1883) connected rail to a Union Depot (1885) built just south of Hennepin Ave. There are archeological remains of Gateway. A Post Office expansion (1989) toward the river without a section 109 review destroyed and made inaccessible a significant part of the archeological remains.

- Hennepin Avenue Bridge Archaeological Site

The site has archeological remains of the 1854 suspension bridge, the first permanent bridge across the Mississippi, and the 1876 second Hennepin Ave. suspension bridge. Remains are on both the west bank and Nicollet Island. Anchors are shown in the west bank First Bridge Park.

- Pacific Sawmill, W of West River Parkway between 1st and 2nd Ave. N.
- Phoenix Flour Mill/Pillsbury Rye Mill, 101-103 Third Ave SE [1875-1956]
- Pillsbury "A" Steam Power Plant, Hennepin Island, E of access road extension of 3rd Ave SE [1903-1964]

River flow is variable, and particularly in the winter, mills may have to shut down from inadequate water flow. Many mills supplemented water power with steam. The first was the Pillsbury A mill with a 1,400 HP steam engine in 1884. When electricity was available from away from St. Anthony Falls (St. Croix Falls, about 1910 ) electricity was also used.

- Second East Side Platform Sawmills, East river channel between foot of Second Ave. SE and foot of Third Ave. [1871-1895]
- West Side Power Plant, 3rd Ave. N and West River Road

== Other historic properties ==
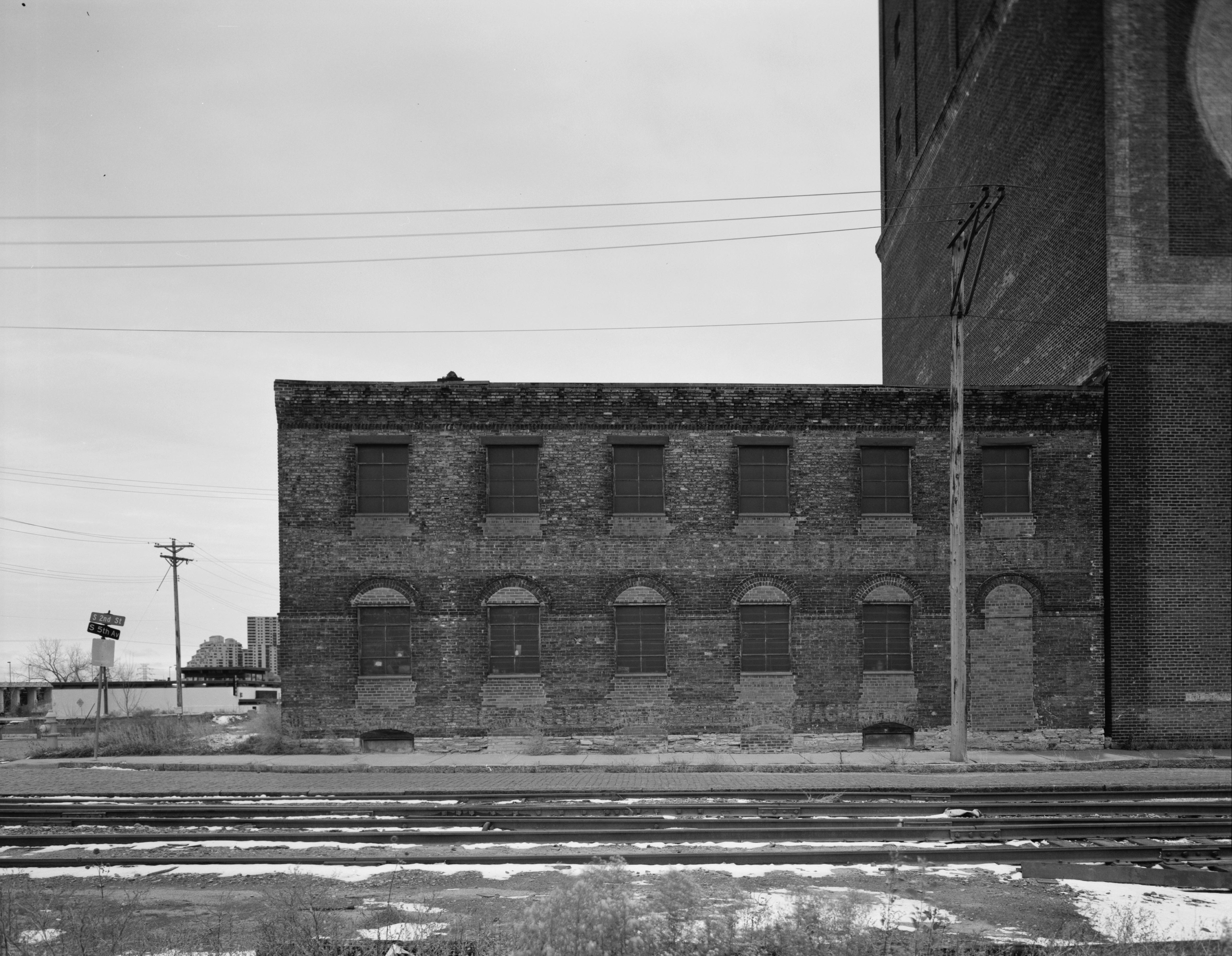
Minneapolis Boiler Works. The large building to the right is the Ceresota Elevator.(HAER 1985)

These historic properties are, or were, in what is now the St. Anthony Falls Historic District but are not contributing resources to the District.

- Brown Ryan Livery Stable [ca. 1880- ]

Built about 1880 at 20 2nd St NE, the building was in the way of a high-rise residential project. In 1981 Minneapolis moved the building to 25 Main St SE. It is now the Brown & Ryan Building (office space) and is part of the Riverplace complex.

- Fuji Ya Restaurant 420 S 1st St [1968-ca. 2018]

Reiko Weston opened the Fuji Ya restaurant in 1968. It was built on the partially exposed foundations of the Bassett Sawmill engine house and the Columbia Flour Mill. The restaurant closed in 1990 after part of the parking had been taken to build the West River Parkway. The restaurant (then owned by the Park Board) long stood abandoned. The building was demolished and a new Water Works Pavilion and Restaurant, built by the Park Board on the same historic foundations, opened in 2021. Fuji Ya is significant as the early commercial rediscovery in the west bank industrial wasteland

- Merriam Street Bridge - crosses the Mississippi from the lower end of Nicollet Island to the east river bank.

Originally part of the ornate Broadway Avenue Bridge, built in 1887. When that bridge was replaced in 1985 one span was moved (floated) down river to become the Merriam Street Bridge.

- Minneapolis Boiler Works - 121-129 Fifth Ave (NE corner of 2nd St S and 5th Ave S) (1881, 1884, 1885-1985)

The building housed multiple iron working firms and other manufacturers, including the Minneapolis Boiler Works and Phoenix Iron Works. In 1908 the south end of the building was demolished to make way for the Northwestern Consolidated (Ceresota) Elevator A. In 1985 the remaining building was demolished for Whitney Mill Quarter Redevelopment. It appears the building was considered as a contributing property to the historic district, but it wasn't added. It is likely nothing remains of the building. Millers Landing Senior Living and a plaza now occupy the site.

- John H Stevens House [1850- ]

The house was built in 1850 downstream from the Hennepin Ave. bridge near present West River Parkway. It is the first permanent house in Minneapolis and is the second oldest remaining house in what is now Minneapolis. The Ard Godfrey house is slightly older but was built in what was then St. Anthony. The Stevens house has been moved four times and is now in Minnehaha Park.

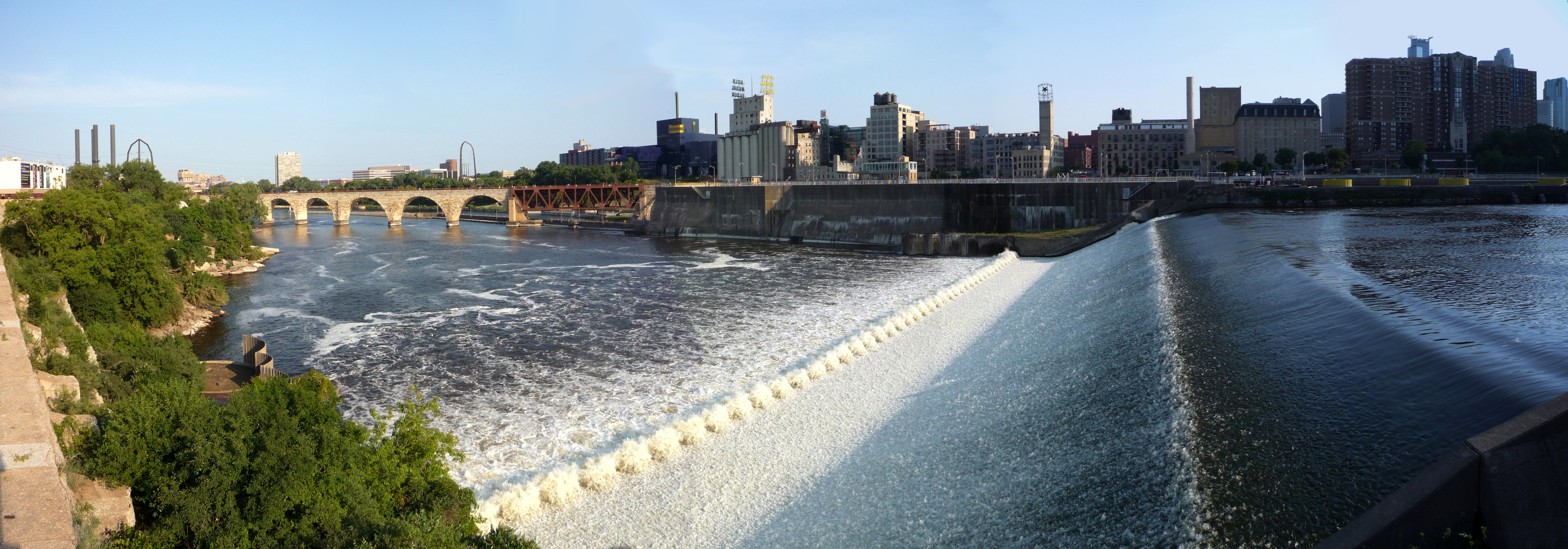
Panoramic photo from the new Water Power Park, visible from this vantage: the lower portion of Saint Anthony Falls; the concrete wall on the far side of the falls is part of the locks to allow ships to pass the waterfall; to the left is the Stone Arch Bridge, above it is the Guthrie Theater; to the right of the Guthrie are the white silos and reconstructed shell of the former Washburn "A" Mill, now the Mill City Museum; to the right of the museum are a series of redeveloped flour and grain mills making up a significant portion of the city's Mills District.

== See also ==
- Mill Ruins Park
- Northwestern Consolidated Milling Company owned many of the west side mills and elevators
- St. Anthony Falls Hydroelectric Development
- Saint Anthony Falls - Industry
- Whitney Mill Quarter Redevelopment a 1980s redevelopment of the Crown Roller Mill, Standard Mill, Ceresota Elevator and Minneapolis Boiler Works
