= Ceresota Building =

- Northwestern Consolidated Milling Company Elevator A
- U.S. Historic district – Contributing property
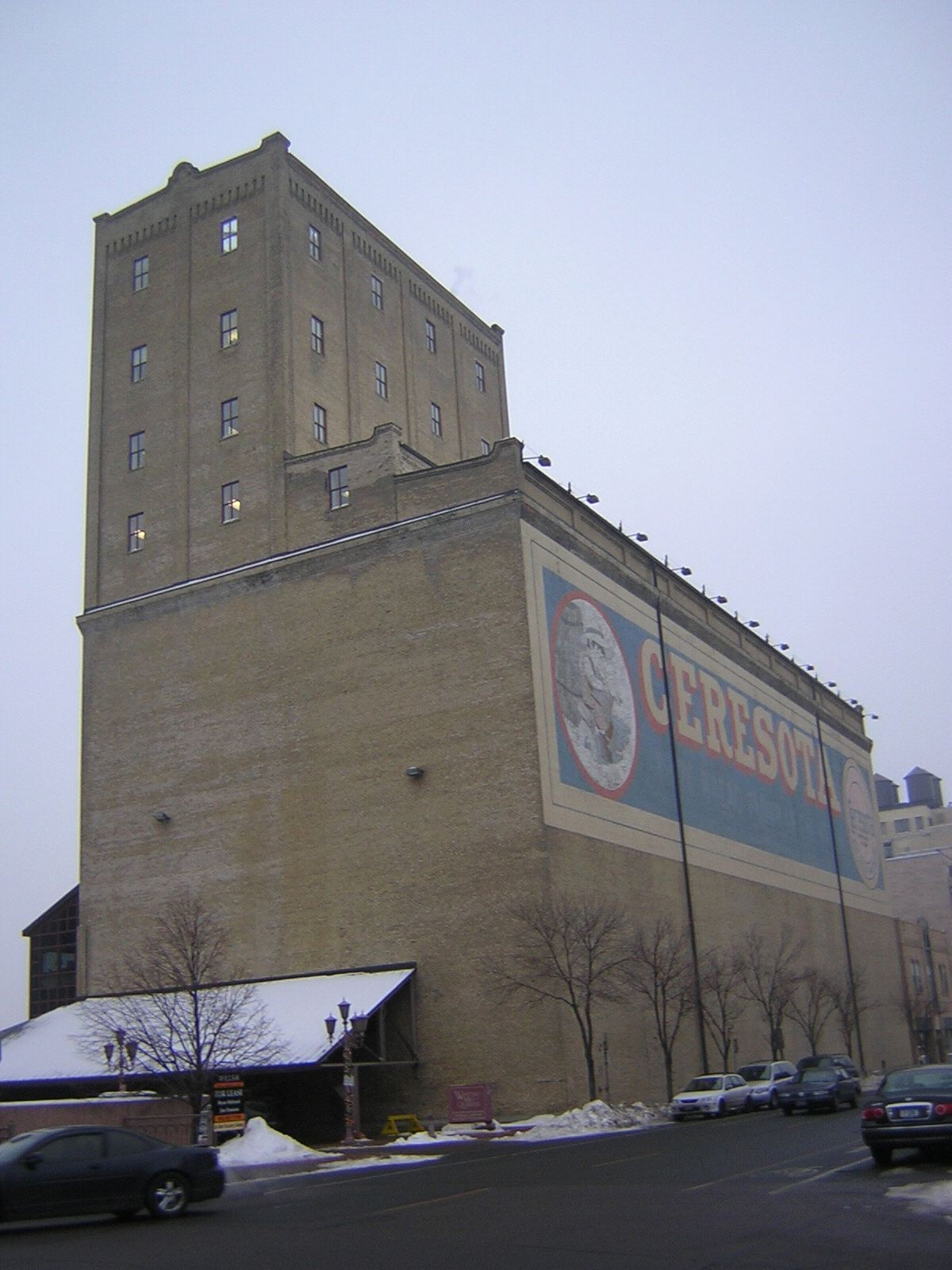

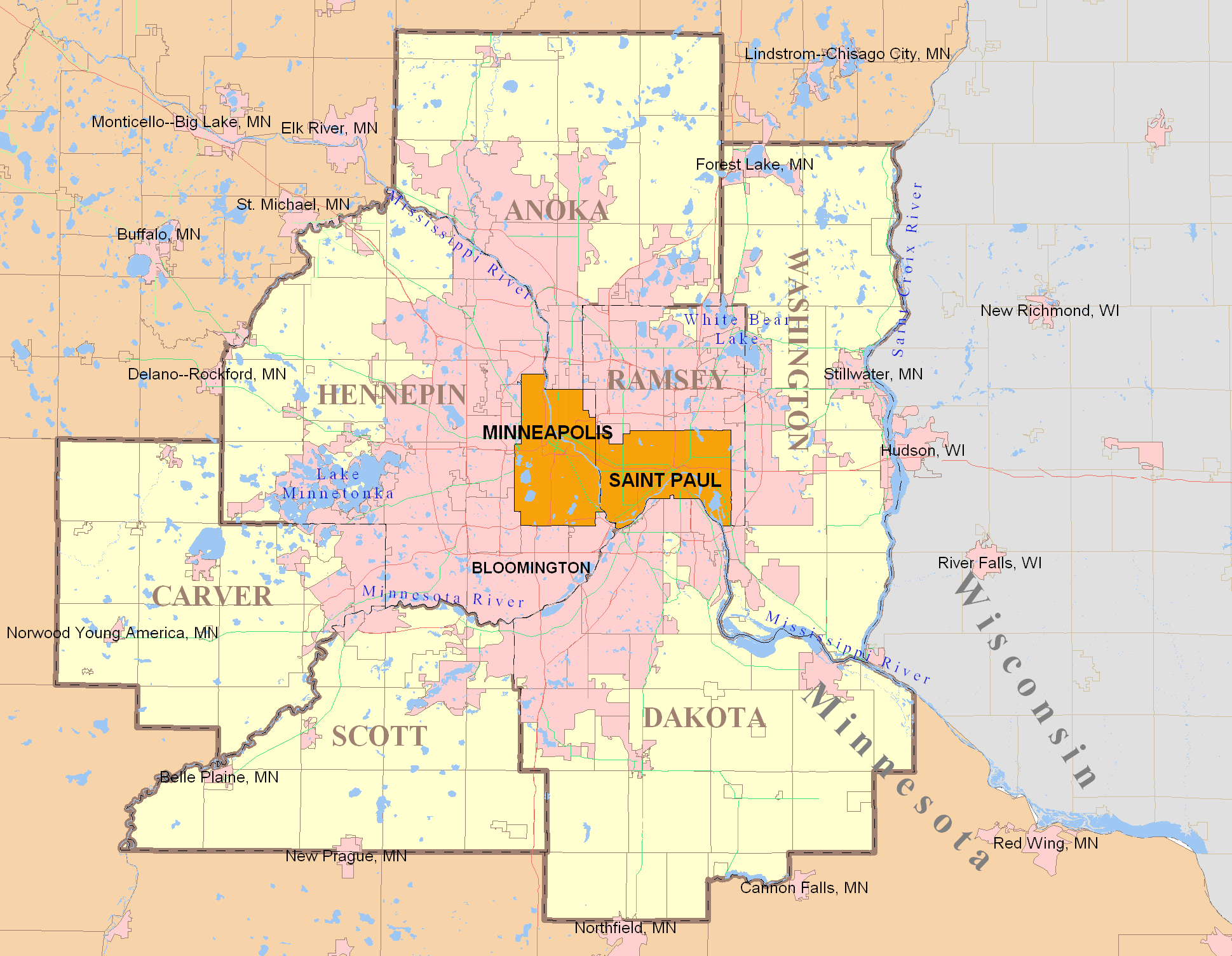
- Location within Minneapolis–Saint Paul Location within Minnesota Location within the United States
- Location: 155 5th Ave. S., Minneapolis, Minnesota, USA
- Coordinates: 44°58′47″N 93°15′35″W
- Built: 1908
- Architect: George T. Honstain, Fred W. Cooley
- Part of: St. Anthony Falls Historic District (ID71000438)
- Designated CP: March 11, 1971

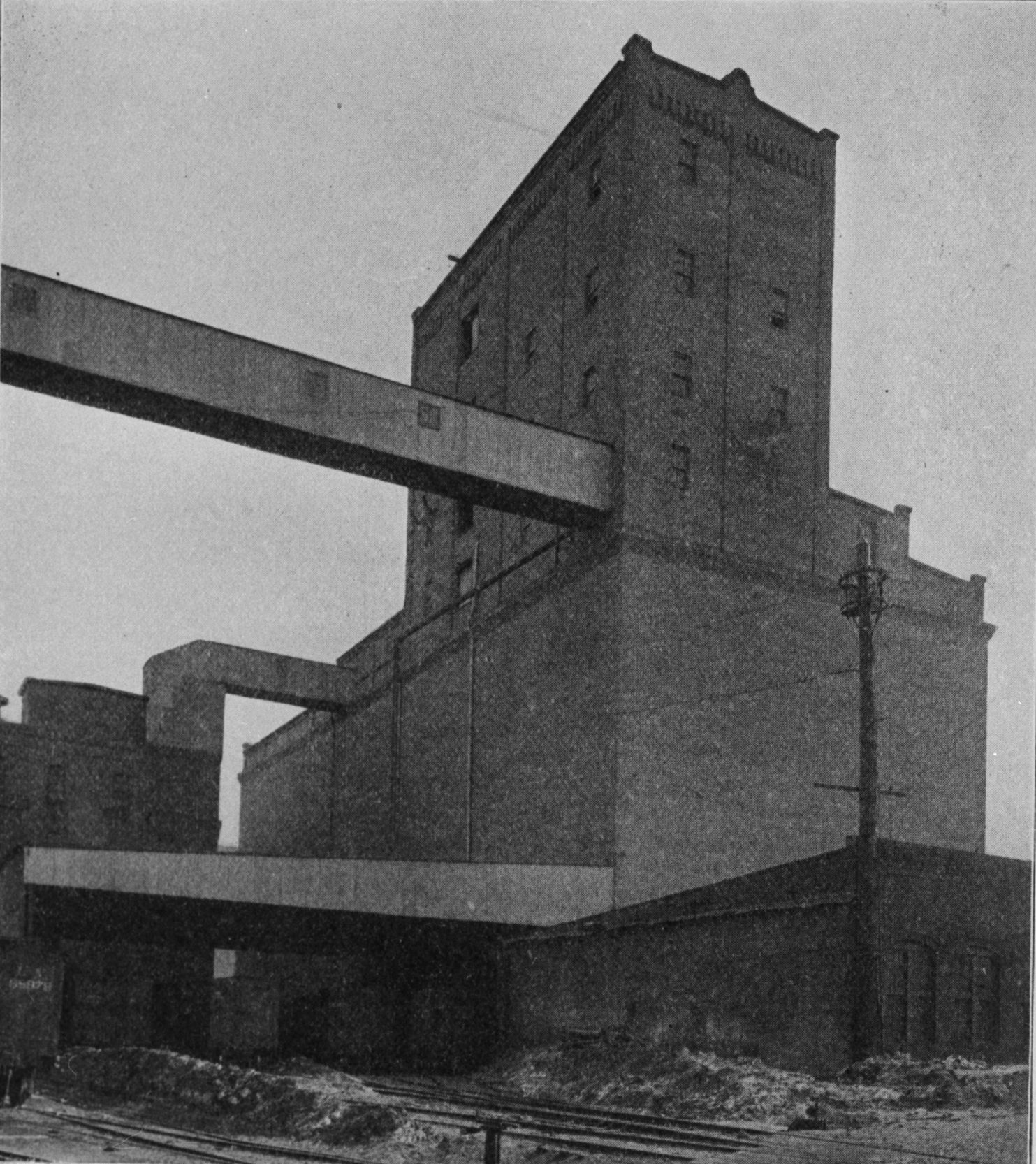
Possibly the largest grain elevator ever built of brick, Elevator A could hold one million bushels of grain.

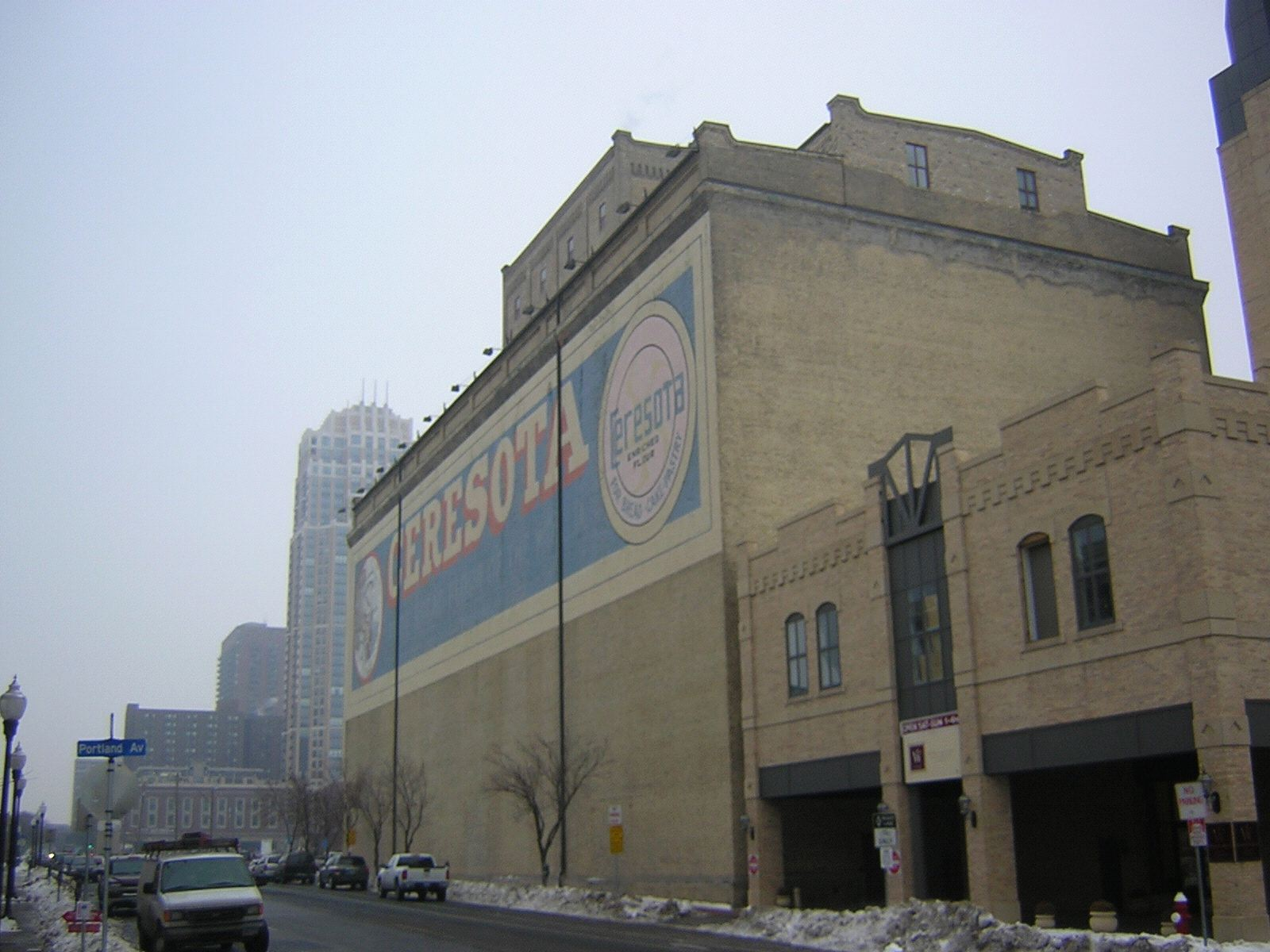
Front of the building

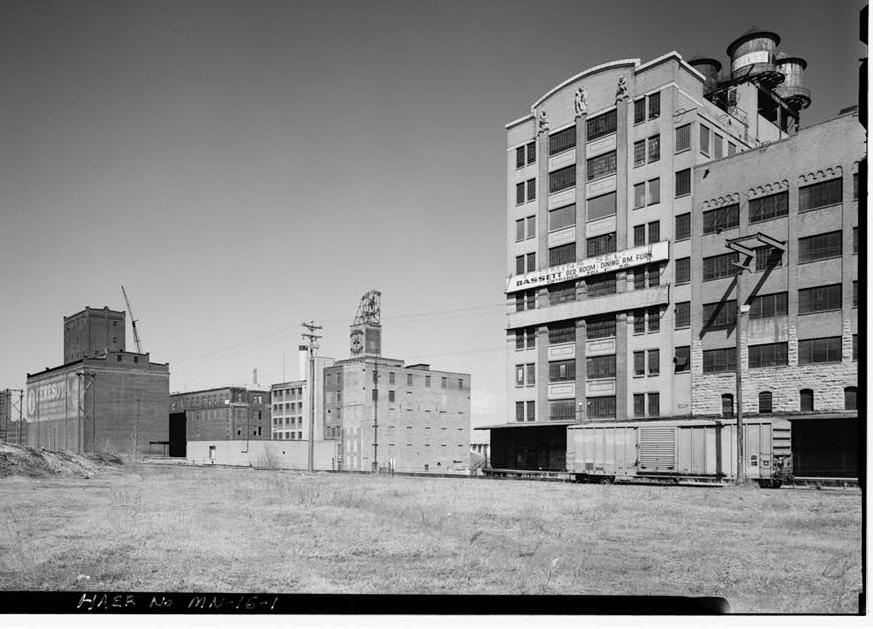
Industrial wasteland with Ceresota elevator at left, North Star Woolen Mill center, Washburn A Mill at right, Utility building to its left (HAER 1986)

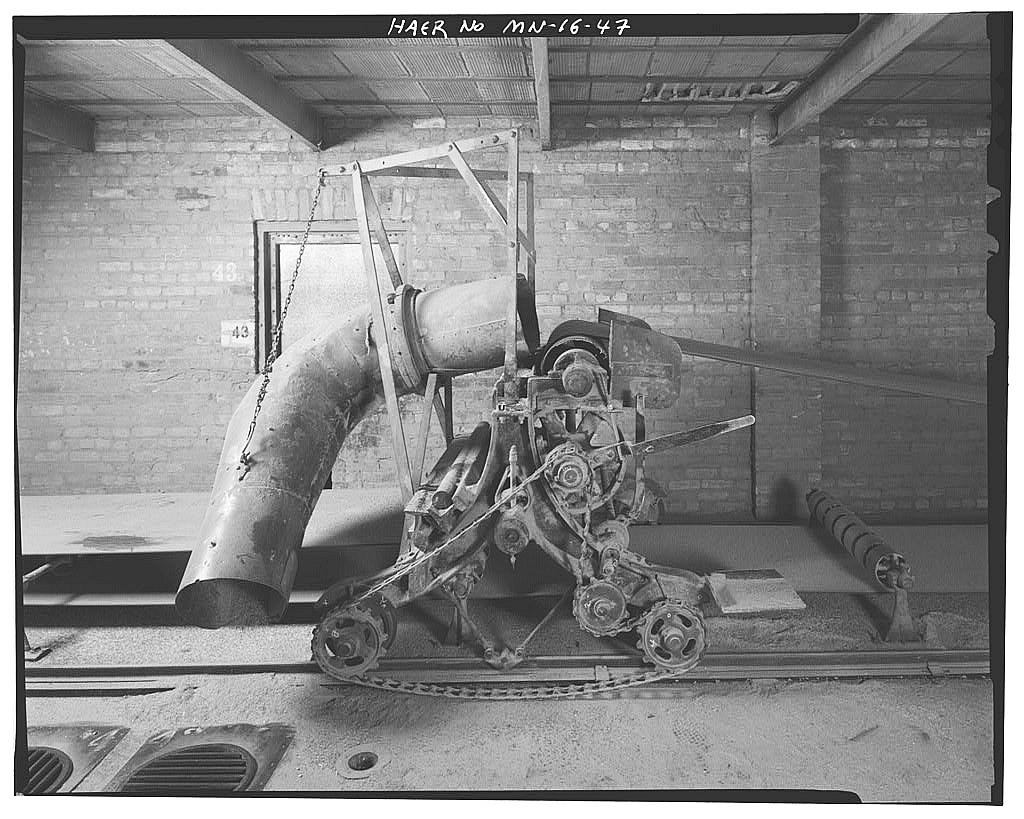
On the head house floor above the bins a conveyor runs through a "tripper" which removes the grain and drops it through a hole in the floor to the appropriate bin. (HAER 1986)

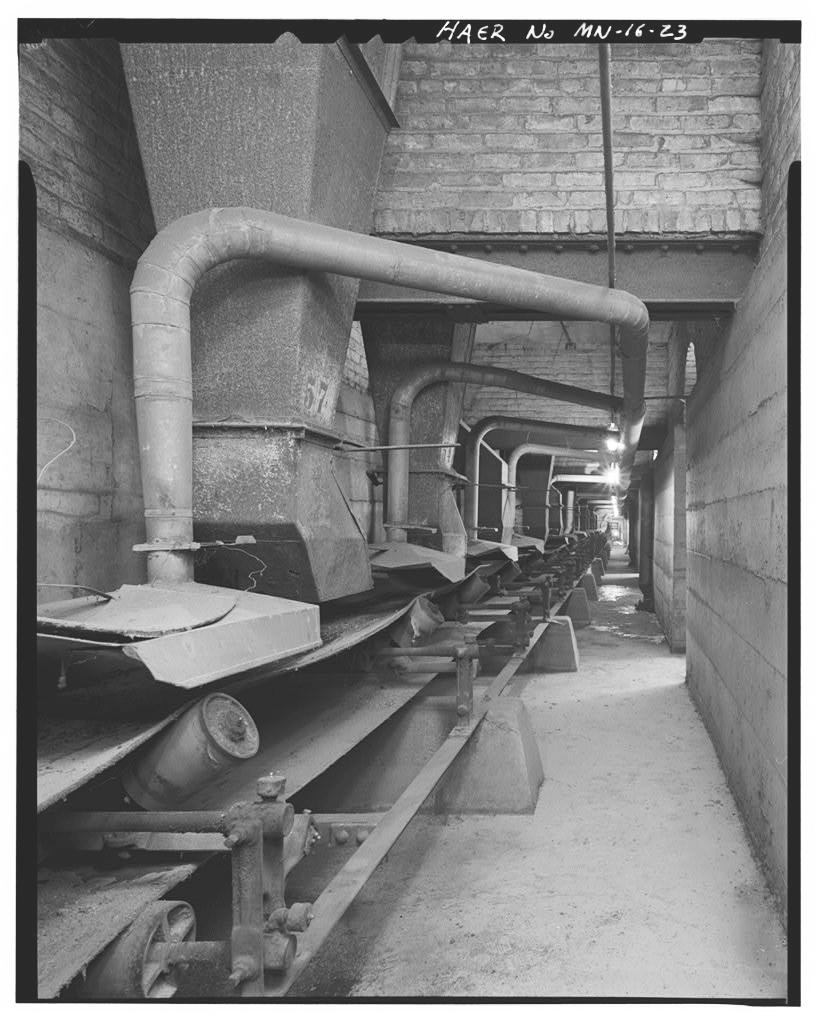
Basement below the bins, grain empties from a bin through a rectangular spout onto a conveyor on the way to the mills; round ducts and pans are dust collectors. (HAER 1986)

Northwestern Consolidated Milling Company Elevator A also known as the Ceresota Elevator and "The Million Bushel Elevator" was a receiving and public grain elevator built by the Northwestern Consolidated Milling Company in 1908 in Minneapolis, Minnesota in the United States. The elevator may have been the largest brick elevator ever constructed (brick construction being relatively uncommon) and ran on electricity. The elevator was the source for the Crown Roller Mill and Standard Mill. Those mills closed in the 1950s but the elevator continued in use for grain storage until the mid 1980s. The building is a contributing property of the St. Anthony Falls Historic District listed in the National Register of Historic Places in 1971. For this article north is toward the river.

== Elevator operation ==
The Ceresota Elevator stored grain for use in the Crown and Standard flour mills. It had 57 bins, 93 feet (28 m) high and almost all were square. The bin structure, like the building, was brick. There were also vertical spaces for a passenger elevator, stairs and three bucket elevators. Grain came in to the elevator in railroad box cars to a train shed on the north side of the elevator. Grain was dropped into a pit and conveyed to one of two bucket elevators ("legs") that lifted the grain to the head house above the bins. Grain was weighed and cleaned and the grain placed on conveyors on the head house floor above the bins. A moveable "tripper" removed the grain from the conveyor and dropped it through a hole in the floor to the appropriate bin.

For grain that is milled, the grain was emptied out the bottom of a bin to a conveyor to another bucket elevator to the head house. The grain was weighed and sent to an outside overhead conveyor bridge from the head house to the Crown or Standard Mill. Flour milling ended at the Standard Mill in 1948 and at the Crown Mill in 1953. The elevator ran on electricity, probably from the Crown Mill boiler plant addition. The Washburn-Crosby No. 1 Elevator (large diameter concrete elevators adjacent to the Washburn A mill) which was built at about the same time operates substantially the same.

== Whitney Mill Quarter Redevelopment ==
The west bank waterpower area was an industrial wasteland in the mid 1980s. Minneapolis bought the Washburn Elevator #2 and 3 in 1987, the last railroad user, with tracks running past the Ceresota elevator..The elevator was closed. Substantial infrastructure needed to be added to redevelop the area.

The whole block, including Ceresota, was redeveloped by the Hayber Development Group with the last of the property being acquired in 1985. Financing included tax increment financing and a federal grant. Elements of the project were:

- The Standard Mill was converted (1987) to the luxury Whitney Hotel which closed 2003. It is now (2007) Whitney Lofts.
- The Crown Roller Mill was nearly demolished after a disastrous 1983 fire that nearly destroyed the building. The walls were repaired and a new mansard roof built. A new interior was built in the shell of the building. The mill and attached boiler house were converted to office space.
- The Minneapolis Boiler Works Building (west of the Ceresota elevator) was demolished in 1985 and is now a plaza. The east end of the building had been demolished in 1908 to make way for the Ceresota Elevator.
- On the far corner, north of the Standard mill, was the Washburn-Crosby Complex, Garage, built 1915. It was razed 1985 and replaced with a plaza over underground parking.
- In 1987 the Ceresota elevator was converted to 92,081 square feet (8,555 m^{2}) of office space. The car shed and bridge conveyors were removed. The vertical bin structure was removed and floors added without destroying the building walls. Windows were added to the north wall. The south wall was left intact, with the huge iconic Ceresota sign (no windows). That resulted in problems for daylight inside. The interior has a large atrium with skylights above. About 2015 the building was converted to Millers Landing Senior Living.

Before the work above, the buildings were documented to Historic American Engineering Record standards. Conversion was sensitive to the building history and the remaining buildings are still contributing properties to the historic district.

== See also ==
Northwestern Consolidated Milling Company
St. Anthony Falls Historic District
