= Southeast Steam Plant =

Heat and power plant in Minnesota

- Twin City Rapid Transit Company Steam Power Plant
- U.S. National Register of Historic Places
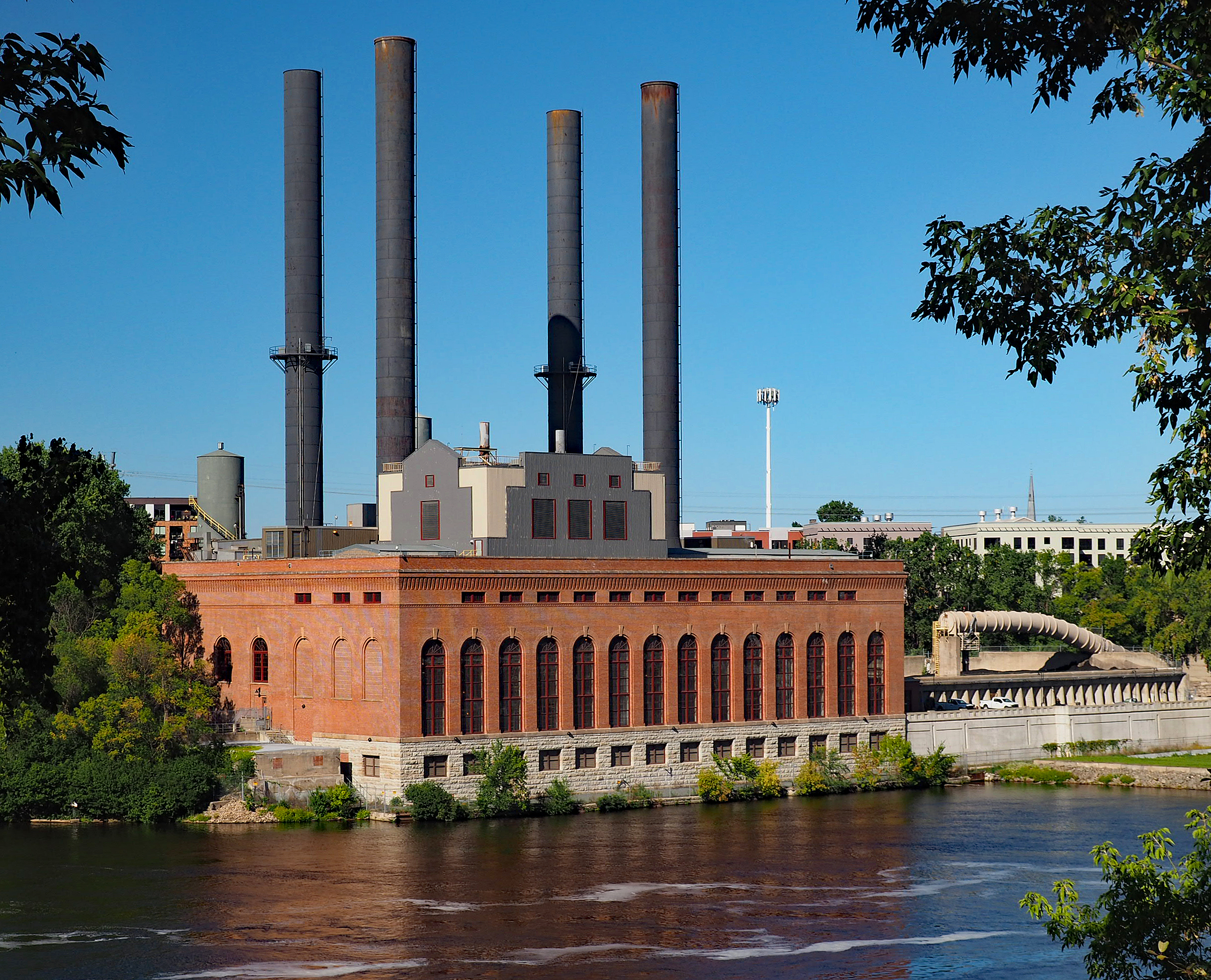
- View from the southwest
- Location: 600 Main Street SE, Minneapolis, Minnesota
- Coordinates: 44°58′51″N 93°14′57″W
- Architect: Sargent and Lundy
- Architectural style: Renaissance
- NRHP reference No.: 94001385
- Added to NRHP: November 25, 1994

The Southeast Steam Plant, formerly known as the Twin City Rapid Transit Company Steam Power Plant, is a combined heat and power plant on the Mississippi River in the city of Minneapolis, Minnesota in the United States owned by the University of Minnesota.

== History ==
The plant originally powered the Twin City Rapid Transit electrical lines.

The plant was constructed in 1903 to provide electricity for the Twin City Rapid Transit street railway system. It supported the area's major form of public transportation for 50 years.

Minneapolis converted to buses in 1949–1954, and in the early 1950s, Northern States Power Company (now Xcel Energy) acquired the building. The University of Minnesota purchased the plant in 1976 for $1.

== Operation ==
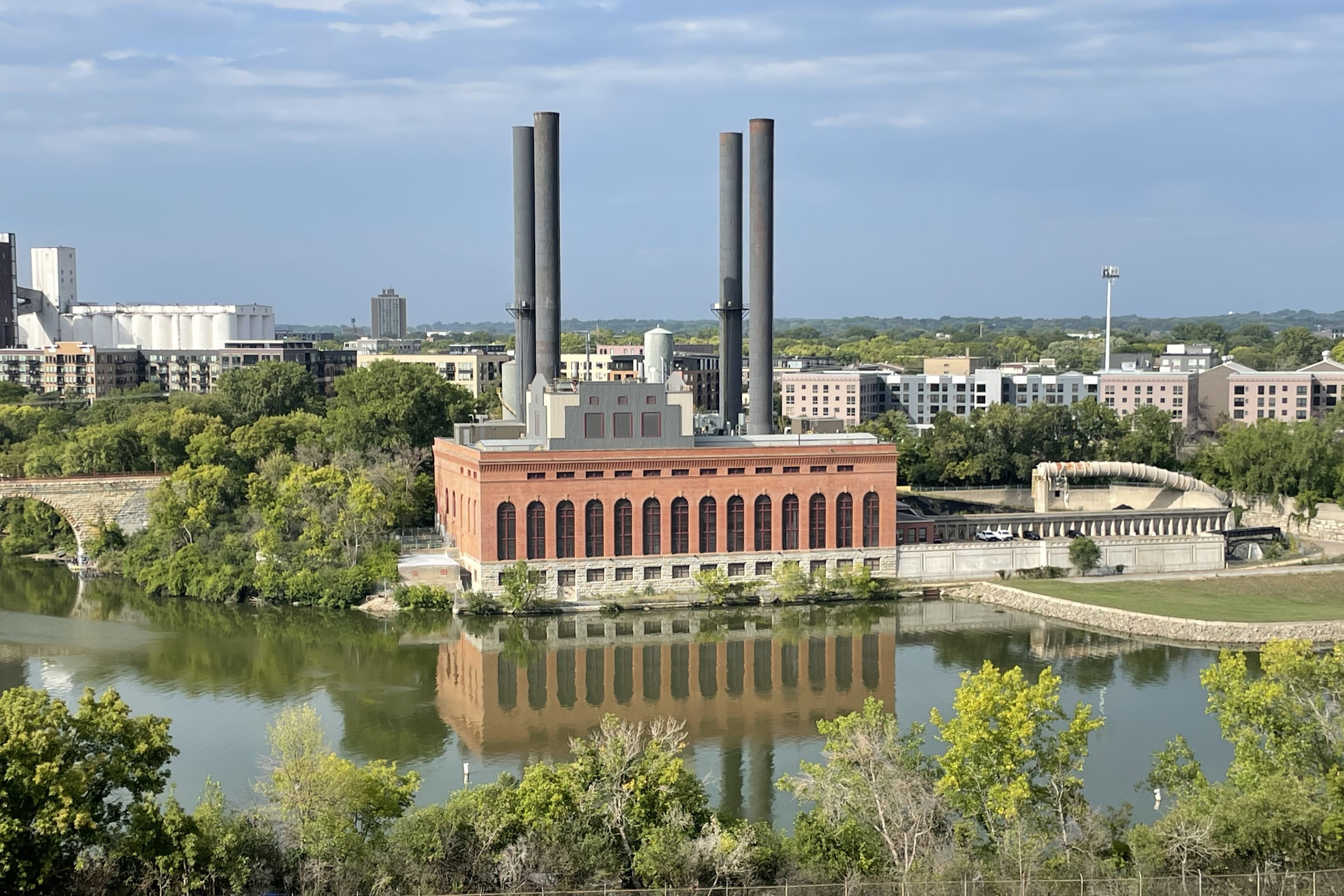
The plant in its context along the Mississippi River.

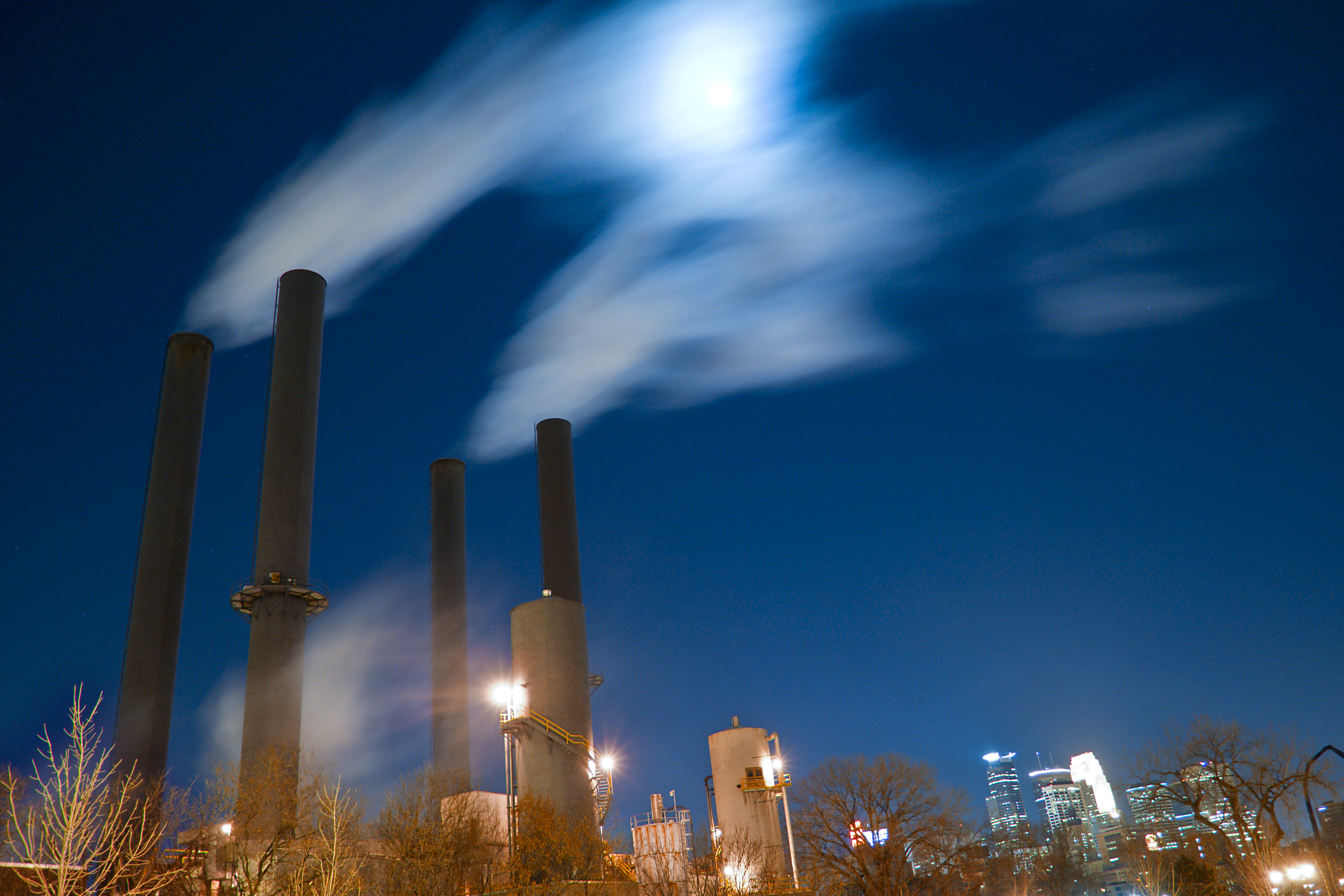
The plant at dusk

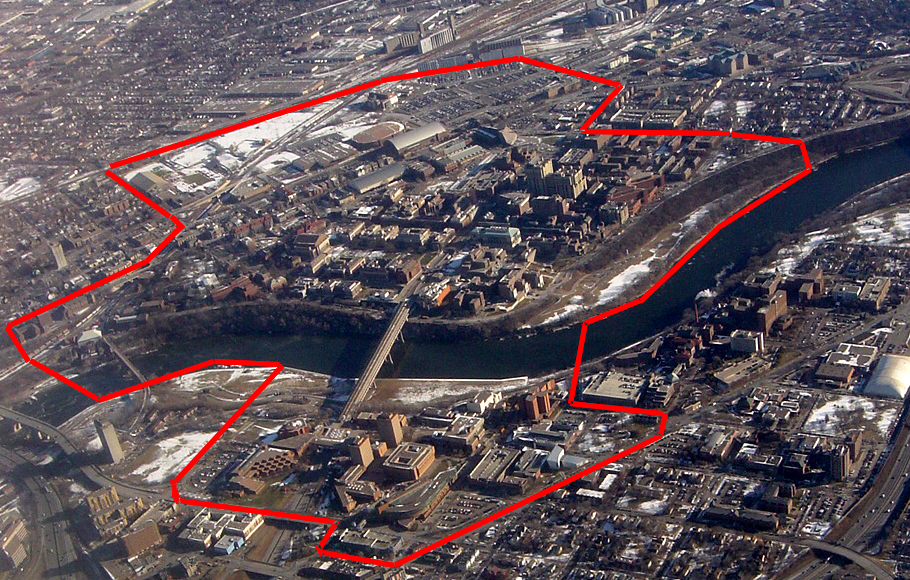
The buildings of the U of M's Minneapolis campus

The facility heats 94 buildings (nearly all of the university's Minneapolis campus), provides electricity to cool 19 of those buildings, and provides steam to the University of Minnesota Medical Center, Minnesota State Board of Health and Cedar Riverside People's Center. Captured as the steam leaves the plant, pressure powers the plant and provides 20% of the university's electricity. The plant's steam is transported through an 18-mile (29 km) network of tunnels to the campus buildings and would be enough to heat 55,000 homes. Each student pays about $200 for energy and those in residence halls pay $375 a year for heat and air conditioning, water heating and dining services.

The plant is university building #059. The university's Energy Management department, part of Facilities Management, oversees the plant. Foster Wheeler Twin Cities was contracted with the U of M to operate it from 1992 to 2016, when Veolia North America took over.

Just upstream is the Hennepin Island Hydroelectric Plant operated by Xcel Energy. The university's Saint Paul, Minnesota campus three miles (5 km) away has its own plant. In addition the university has generators, pumps and boilers powered by diesel and natural gas, most used only in emergencies, with 11 used as peak shaving units.

== Rehabilitation ==
Before pipes were reinsulated, employees needed breaks once an hour to work in the tunnels which reached 115 °F (46 °C). Insulation reduced the ambient temperature to 80 °F (27 °C), and the loss of energy from 10% to 4%, and over time resulted in a 25% campus-wide decrease in energy consumption.

The university closed the Southeast plant to gut and rebuild the interior, and in 2000, reopened it and closed down its old coal-burning power plant.

Completed in 2005, exterior rehabilitation won a local historic preservation award, presented to the university and Miller Dunwiddie Architects, McGough Construction, Hess Roise Historical Consultants, Meyer Borgman Johnson, Michaud Cooley Erickson, INSPEC, Akiba Architects, and Kimley Horn.

== Boilers, fuel and emissions ==
Among the "cleanest burning power plants in the country," the high temperature fires almost completely consume its fuels—natural gas, fuel oil, coal, and wood waste. The plant has tested and been approved for oat hull biofuel, a renewable resource that would reduce each student's fees by about $21.

Four boilers are operational. A fluidized bed boiler (CFB) is seven stories high and capable of burning fuel oil, coal, wood, oat hulls or natural gas. There are two natural gas boilers, and one pulverized coal boiler, that can also fire fuel oil. There is a spreader stoker coal boiler, also capable of burning fuel oil and possibly oat hulls that is decommissioned. During May and October, the periods of lowest demand, the CFB boiler is not in use.

The CFB controls emissions of the acid gases sulfur dioxide, hydrogen chloride and hydrogen fluoride and particulate matter (PM) with limestone injection and a fabric filter. The pulverized coal and spreader stoker boilers are equipped with dry gas scrubbers (spray dryers). Two boilers have no control equipment but have flue gas recirculation to limit nitrogen oxide emission. The plant emits almost zero sulfur and mercury.

The unloading terminal for rail cars and its conveyors are enclosed and equipped with baghouse filters. The outdoor coal bunker is shielded from the wind by concrete retaining walls. Storage silos for ash have fabric filters.

== Criticism ==
Environmental groups including the Save Our Riverfront Coalition and Friends of the Mississippi Inc. attempted and failed to move the plant off the river in 1996. Elected officials Phyllis Kahn and Larry Pogemiller, Arne Carlson who was governor of Minnesota, and Sharon Sayles Belton who was mayor of Minneapolis supported the move. Concerned about potential emissions and noise from deliveries, some neighborhood associations and a condominium developer at the nearby Pillsbury "A" Mill criticized the plant's 2005 application to amend its permit to allow tests of alternative fuels.

== Biofuel ==
The Minnesota Pollution Control Agency approved use of biomass fuels, specifically oat hulls in 2006 but the three years necessary for testing and the approval process lost the source of the hulls. General Mills, makers of the oat cereal Cheerios, had signed a contract by then with U.S. Steel for use in their facility on the Iron Range in northern Minnesota.
