= Our Lady of Lourdes Catholic Church (Minneapolis, Minnesota) =

Historic church in Minnesota, United States

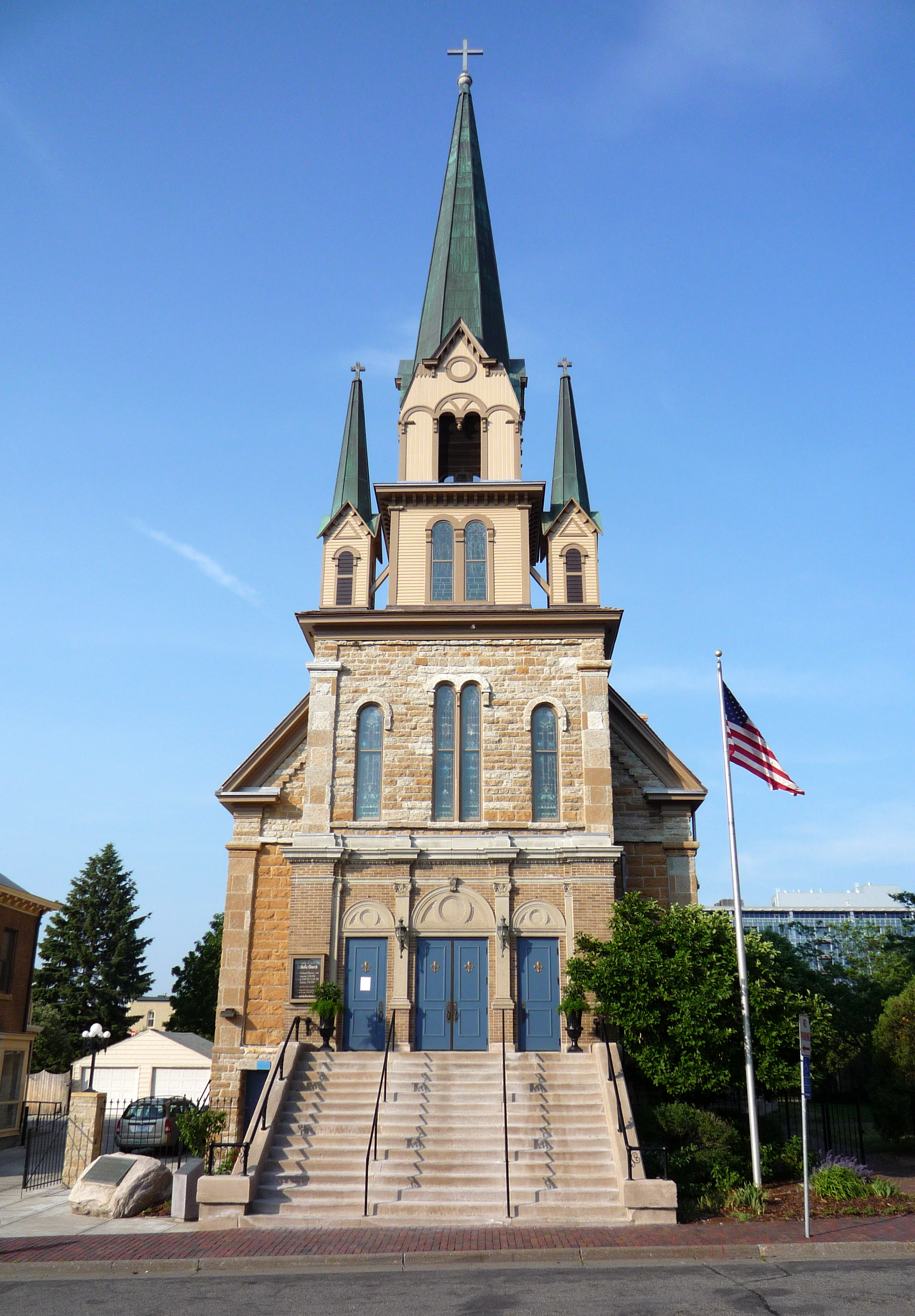

- Location within Minnesota
- 44°59′12.3″N 93°15′27.1″W
- Location: One Lourdes Place; Minneapolis, Minnesota
- Country: United States
- Denomination: Roman Catholic
- Previous denomination: Universalist
- Website: www.ourladyoflourdesmn.com

History
- Former name: First Universalist Church
- Status: Parish church

Architecture
- Functional status: Active
- Heritage designation: NRHP
- Architect: Carl F. Struck (parsonage)
- Architectural type: Greek Revival; French Provincial; Gothic Revival
- Years built: 1854–1857

Clergy
- Pastor: Fr John M. Bauer
- Our Lady of Lourdes Catholic Church
- U.S. Historic district – Contributing property
- Part of: St. Anthony Falls Historic District (ID71000438)
- Added to NRHP: March 11, 1971

Our Lady of Lourdes Catholic Church is a Roman Catholic parish church of the Archdiocese of Saint Paul and Minneapolis located in Minneapolis, Minnesota in the United States. It was built on the east bank of the Mississippi River in today's Nicollet Island/East Bank neighborhood; it is the oldest continuously used church building in the city and is part of the St. Anthony Falls Historic District.

== History ==
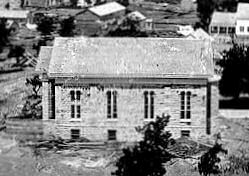
The First Universalist Church in 1857

The oldest church building in Minneapolis, Our Lady of Lourdes has been in continuous use since the mid-19th century. The First Universalist Society of St. Anthony erected the building in Greek Revival style as a meeting hall between 1854 and 1857 as the First Universalist Church where they worshipped until 1877. A congregation of Catholic French Canadians acquired the church in 1877 and named it in honor of the Blessed Virgin Mary who had recently appeared to Bernadette Soubirous in France as Our Lady of Lourdes. One of many churches throughout the world named for the appearances in Lourdes, Our Lady of Lourdes in Minneapolis was the first in the U.S. with this name. The Catholic parish made significant additions to the building between 1880 and 1883, adding a transept, apse and front bell tower with three steeples; a front vestibule was added in 1914.

Near the birthplace of Minneapolis, the church stands near the Pillsbury "A" Mill and the only natural waterfall on the Mississippi River. The building is not listed as a National Historic Landmark but it is the subject of Historic American Buildings Survey (HABS) drawings and photographs created in 1934.

The parish school spoke French until about 1917 when the congregation dwindled and by 1945 the priests gave sermons only in English. The church survived extinction when the Minneapolis City Council persuaded bishops of the diocese to stop plans to close and board it up in 1968. Our Lady of Lourdes is now one of 85 contributing properties of the St. Anthony Falls Historic District which is on the National Register of Historic Places.

== Architecture ==
The architecture is an unusual combination of architectural styles. The Universalists constructed the original building of limestone quarried at nearby Nicollet Island in Greek Revival style based on a Greek temple (shown below at left). Their design was 3,000 square feet (280 m^{2}) and built at a cost of $15,000. In the 1880s, the Catholic congregation added a V-frame beam truss, the steeple, the transept, bell tower, sacristy and vestibule in French Provincial and Gothic Revival style. The design for the circular nave comes from the Chapel Royale at Versailles.

== Today ==
The church teaches Catholic beliefs, the morality and model for conduct taught by Jesus, the sacraments and prayer. Members believe in caring for the ill and those who are physically unable to attend services. The parish offers classes called faith formation for all ages.

To support the continuing restoration of their church, the congregation produces and sells French Canadian tourtières, a savory meat pie. Parishioners have protected the stained glass, building exterior, and the Blessed Virgin's grotto above the front entrance, and have restored the interior, renovated the rectory and added carillon bells. Guided tours are offered by appointment. The address was at one time Prince Street and is now called Lourdes Place.

== Gallery ==
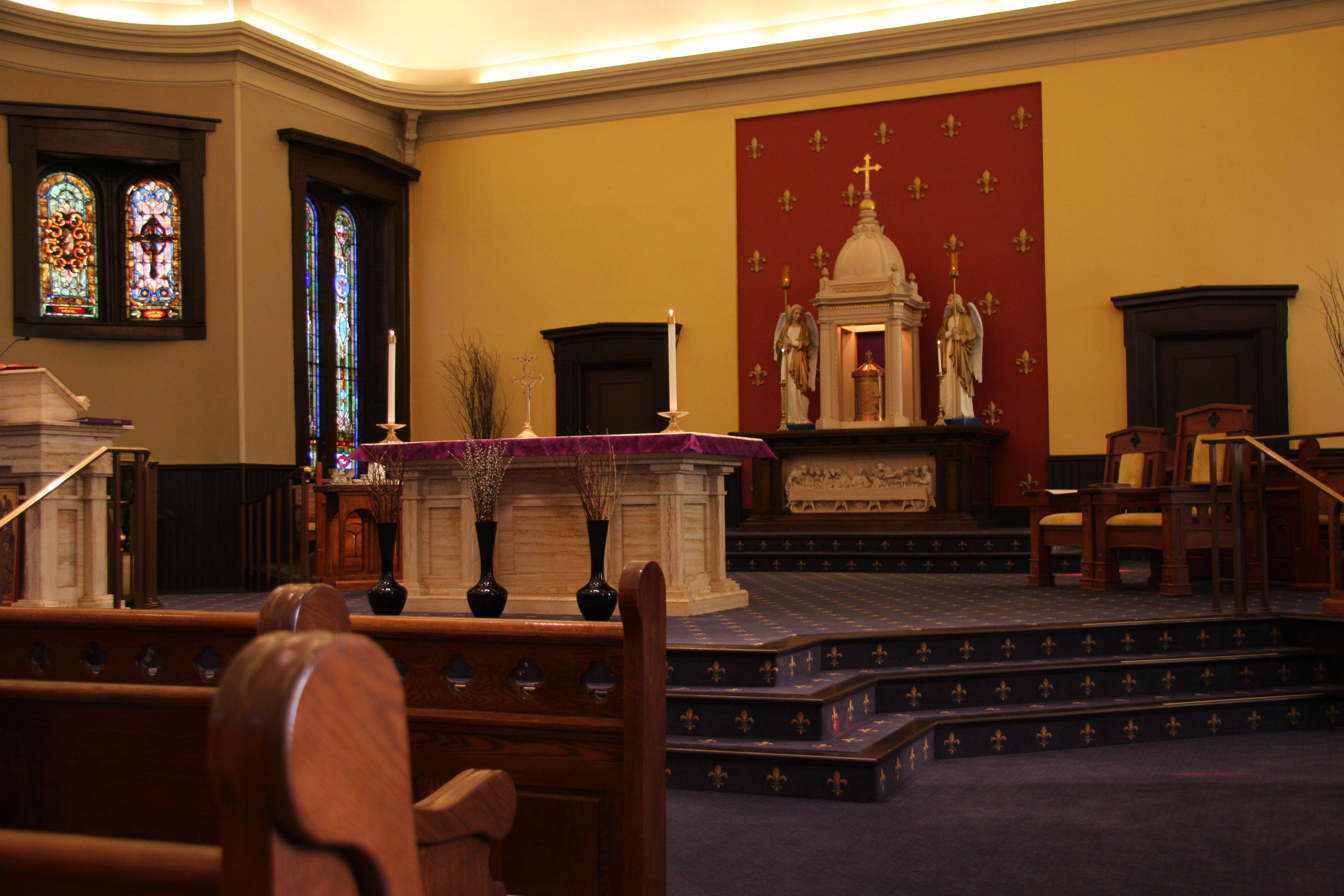
The inside of the church in 2015

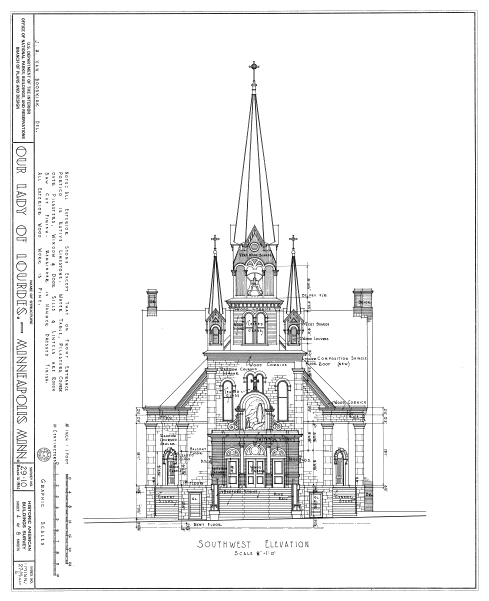
Drawing made for the 1934 HABS
