= Mill Ruins Park =

- U.S. Historic district – Contributing property
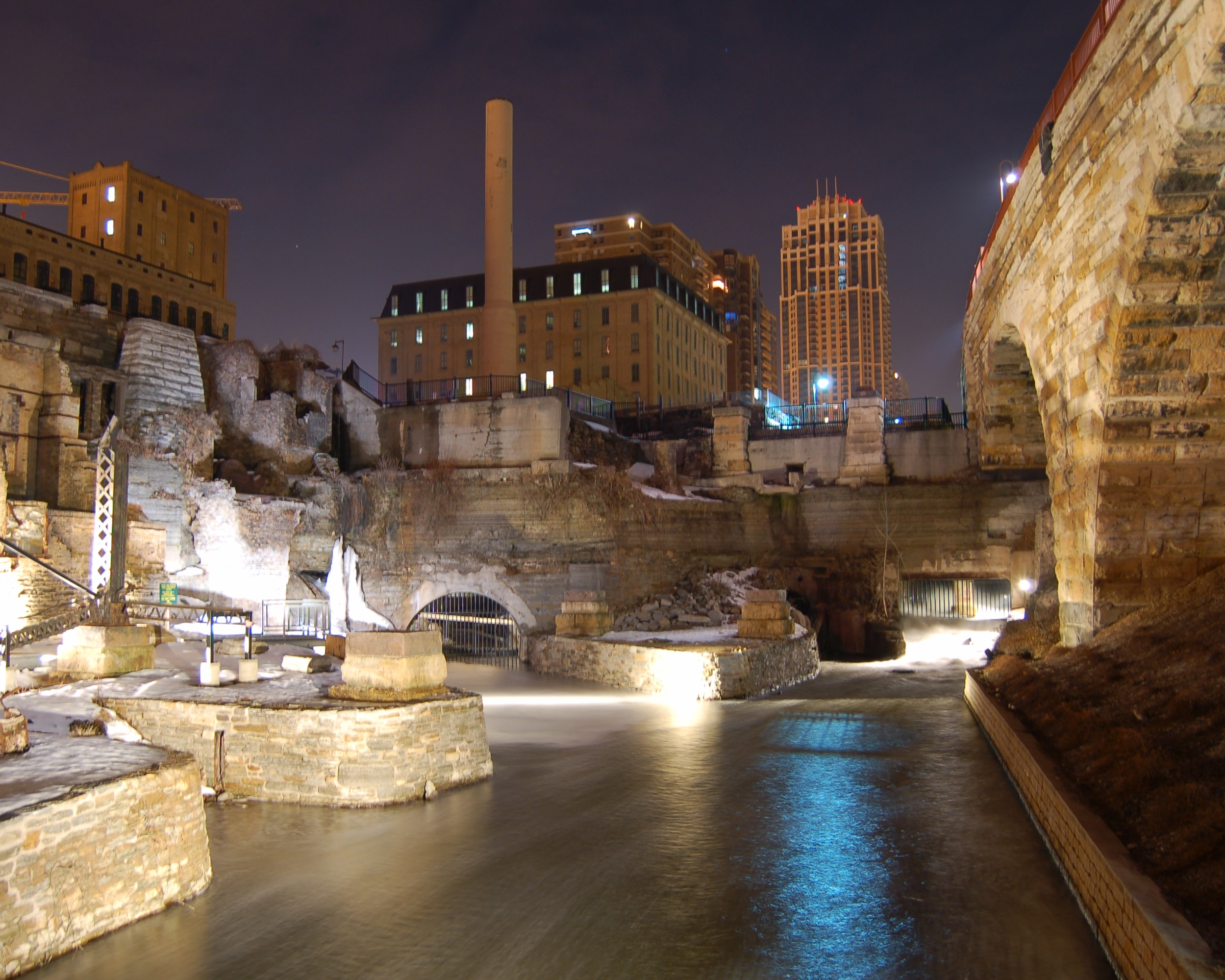
- This picture shows the output of one of the water power canals that powered mills at Saint Anthony Falls. The west end of the Stone Arch Bridge is directly overhead.
- Location: Minneapolis, Minnesota
- Coordinates: 44°58′49.29″N 93°15′28.16″W
- Built: Power canal built 1857, mills built between 1859 and the mid-1890s
- Architect: Minneapolis Mill Company et al.
- Part of: Saint Anthony Falls Historic District (ID71000438)

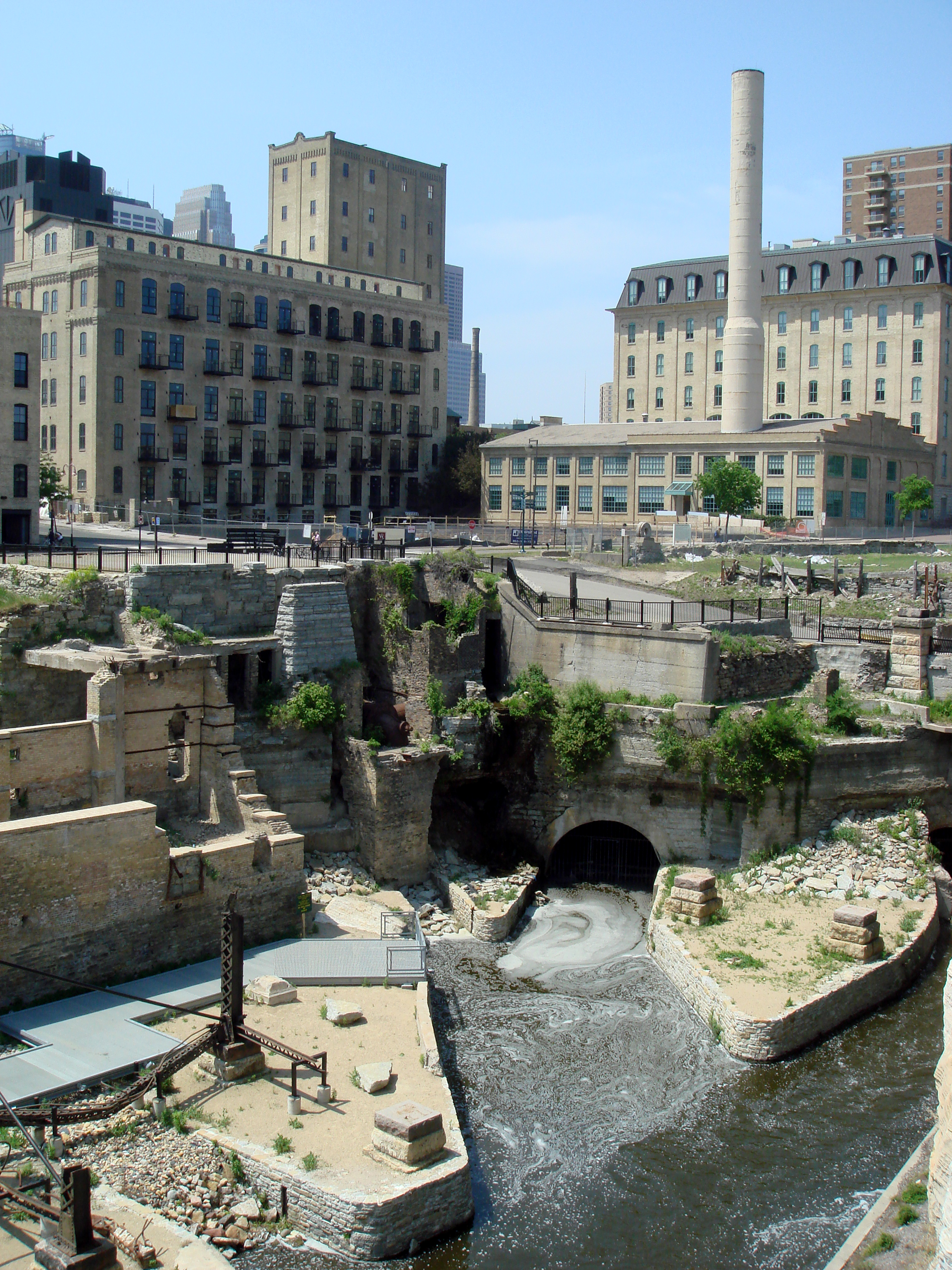
Some of the original mills above the park have been converted into other uses such as condominiums and modern offices

Mill Ruins Park is a park in downtown Minneapolis, Minnesota, United States, standing on the west side of Saint Anthony Falls on the Mississippi River and running from 3rd Ave. S. to about 9th Ave. S. The park interprets the history of flour milling in Minneapolis and shows the ruins of several flour mills that were abandoned.

The park is the result of an archaeological study of the Saint Anthony Falls Historic District. The district was listed on the National Register of Historic Places in 1971. In 1983, a project was being considered to extend West River Parkway along the west side of the Mississippi River in downtown Minneapolis. Scott Anfinson, then the municipal county highway archaeologist for the Minnesota Historical Society, developed a plan to assess archaeological sites along the riverfront. A number of test excavations along the route revealed a wide variety of sites containing items of interest. In the Bassett's Creek area, for example, the foundations of two sawmills and the remains of a railroad roundhouse were found, while near Hennepin Avenue, the investigation found the footings of the Great Northern Railway Union Depot and the tower bases of the first and second Hennepin Avenue Bridges. In the milling district, archaeologists found clues suggesting that there were still extensive remains of the foundations of the mills and waterpower system.

The first round of archaeological surveys in the 1980s was intended to save the ruins from destruction as a result of road construction projects. Later, in the 1990s, the focus shifted from environmental impact assessment to exposing ruins for their interpretive value. As the ruins were made visible to the public, the goal was to create assets for education, tourism, and commercial development. The excavations for Mill Ruins Park began in 1998 and continued through 2001. The process also involved stabilizing the remains of the Washburn "A" Mill, which had burned in 1991. The Washburn "A" Mill became part of the Mill City Museum.

Along with the remains of about 20 flour mills and other industrial buildings, the park also contains two stone piers and several iron girder piers that held a trestle for the Minneapolis Eastern Railroad. The tailraces from the waterpower canal are also clearly visible, and the water flow has been restored through the canal. Signs posted along the walkways interpret the ruins and the history of the area.
