= North Star Woolen Mill =

- U.S. Historic district – Contributing property
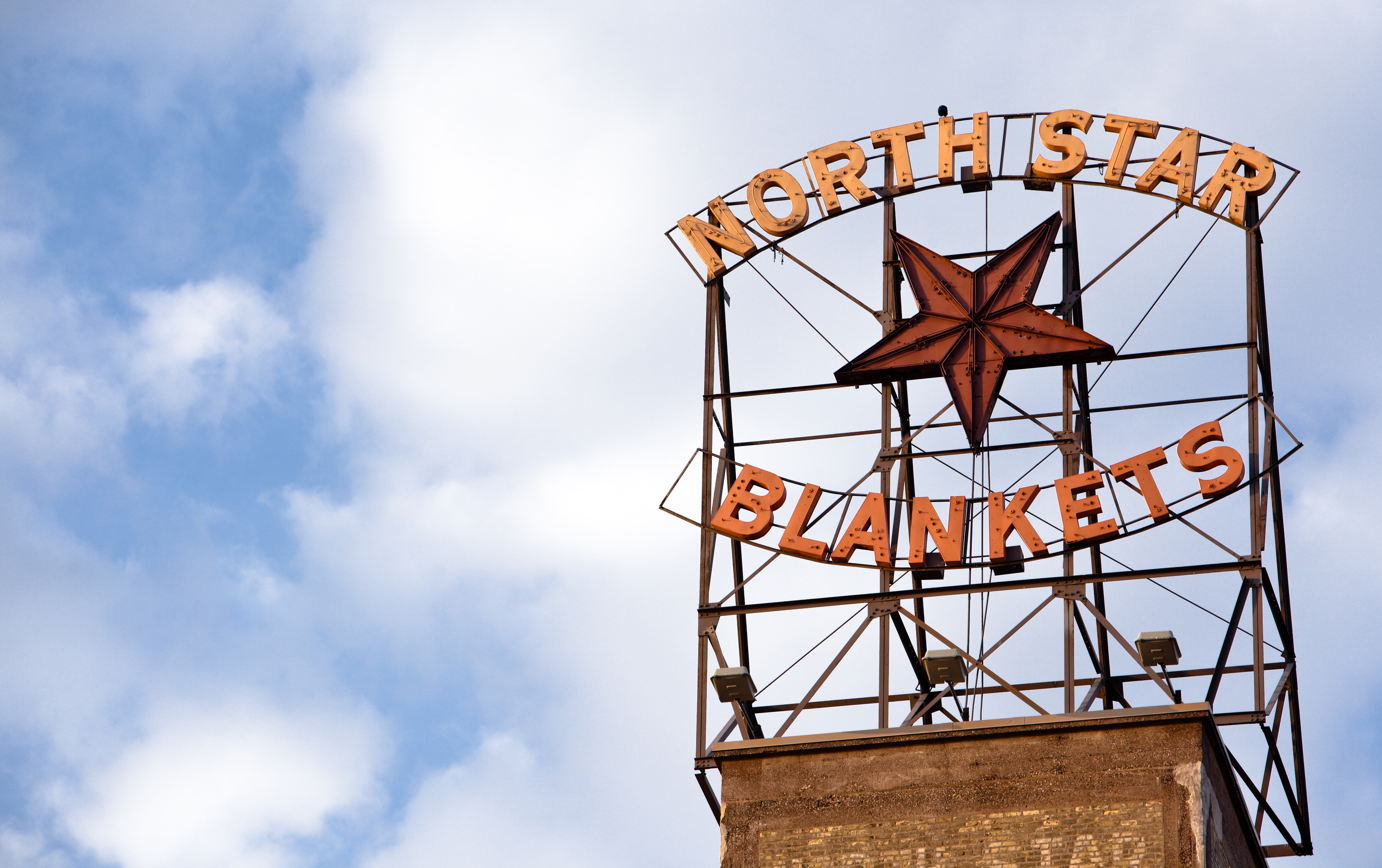
- The North Star Blankets sign
- Location: Minneapolis, Minnesota
- Built: 1864
- Architect: Pike & Cook/ C. F. Haglin & Sons
- Part of: St. Anthony Falls Historic District (ID71000438)

The North Star Woolen Mill, now the North Star Lofts, is a building in downtown Minneapolis, Minnesota, United States. The building, located in the St. Anthony Falls Historic District, was originally a textile mill for the North Star Woolen Company. The mill was built in 1864 by W.W. Eastman and Paris Gibson on the west side of the west side canal. High quality wool blankets, scarves, flannels, and yarns were manufactured at the facility and it became the nation's largest manufacturer of wool blankets by 1925.

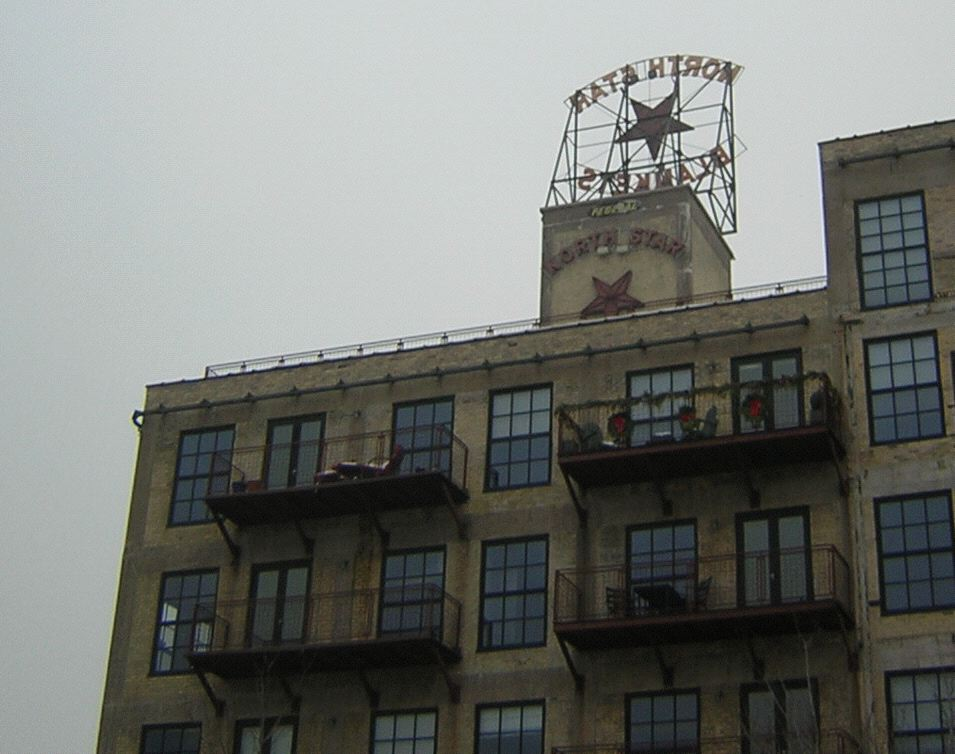
Back of the sign

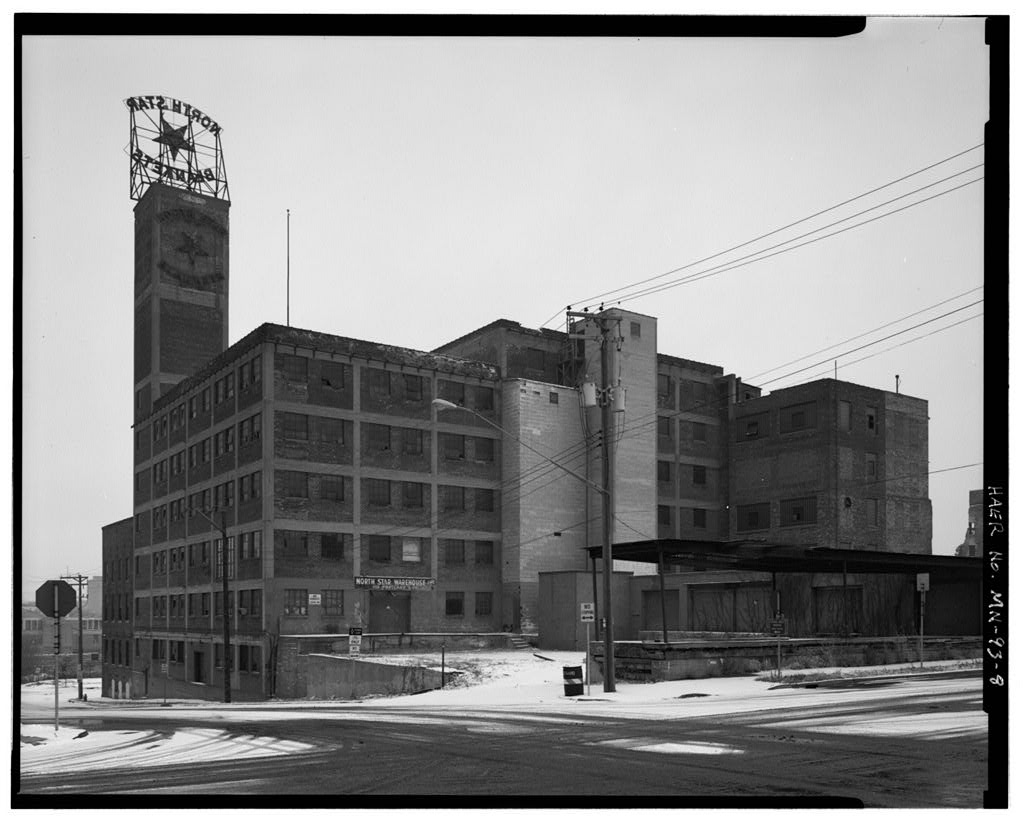
North Star Woolen Mill

Entrepreneurs in the early days of Minneapolis had high hopes for developing a textile industry at the falls, similar to that of Lowell, Massachusetts. However, the industry never had as much success as hoped for, mainly because Minneapolis was a long distance from eastern markets and shipping centers. The North Star Woolen Mill was an exception, and it remained a significant industry in Minneapolis until the 1940s.

In 1949 the North Star Woolen Company moved its operations to Lima, Ohio. In the 1950s North Star Woolen mills was used as a public warehouse, North Star Warehouse. North Star Warehouse existed from the 1950s to the late 1970s and had multiple locations, the Portland Ave location being the primary location. The building later sat empty until it was re-developed in 1998-99 into lofts. The building maintains its existing exterior including a sign reading "North Star Blankets".
