= Hennepin Island Hydroelectric Plant =

Coordinates: 44.982400°N 93.254155°W

- U.S. Historic district – Contributing property
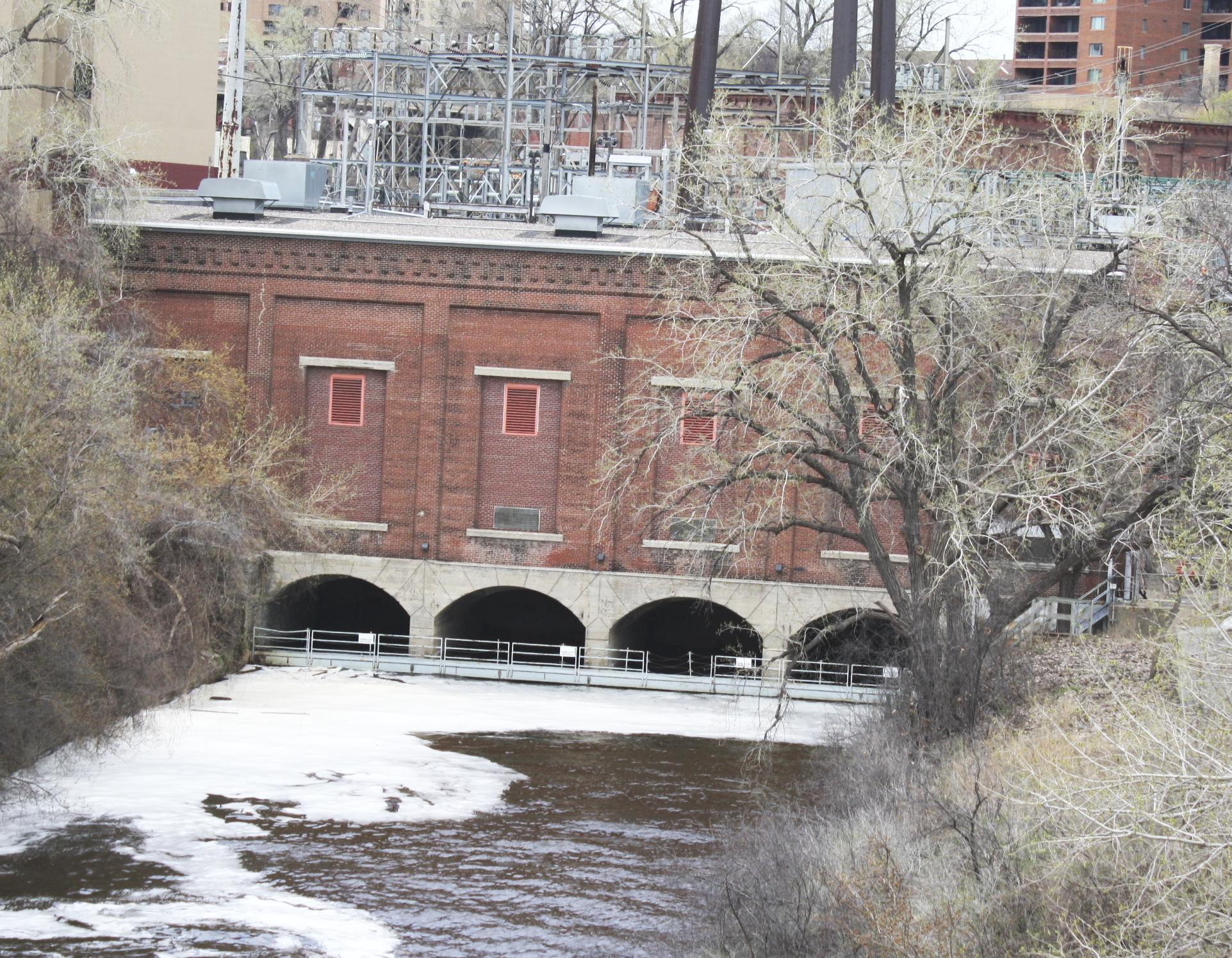
- Plant and its tailrace in 2019
- Location: W. side of Hennepin Island, Minneapolis, Minnesota, USA
- Built: 1908
- Architect: William de la Barre
- Architectural style: Commercial
- Part of: St. Anthony Falls Historic District (ID71000438)
- Designated CP: March 11, 1971

The Hennepin Island Hydroelectric Plant is on Hennepin Island adjacent to St. Anthony Falls in Minneapolis, Minnesota. It has historically been an important part of St. Anthony Falls Hydroelectric Development. The plant is currently operated by Northern States Power/Xcel Energy. The facility stands on Hennepin Island near the Pillsbury "A" Mill at Saint Anthony Falls, the river's only major waterfall, which powered the city's early sawmills, grist mills and other industry. There are five generating units.

NSP/Xcel renewed its license which was authorized by the Federal Energy Regulatory Commission in March 2004. One condition of the license is the creation of a recreation area to show the evolution of St. Anthony Falls. A portion of the island overlooking the falls has been made into Water Power Park, allowing the closest possible approaches to the falls. In 2008, NSP/Xcel collaborated with the University of Minnesota's St. Anthony Falls Laboratory on 'StreamLab', an 'experimental stream channel and floodplain system' which improves two existing flood bypass channels to study the site's ecology and hydrology.

The plant is one of 99 contributing properties of the St. Anthony Falls Historic District which is listed on the National Register of Historic Places.

Crown Hydro, LLC, has proposed another hydro plant for the falls, to be built on the opposite bank of the Mississippi next to the Stone Arch Bridge.
