= MacPhail Center for Music =

Music school in Minneapolis, Minnesota, US

Coordinates: 44.9794356°N 93.260322°W

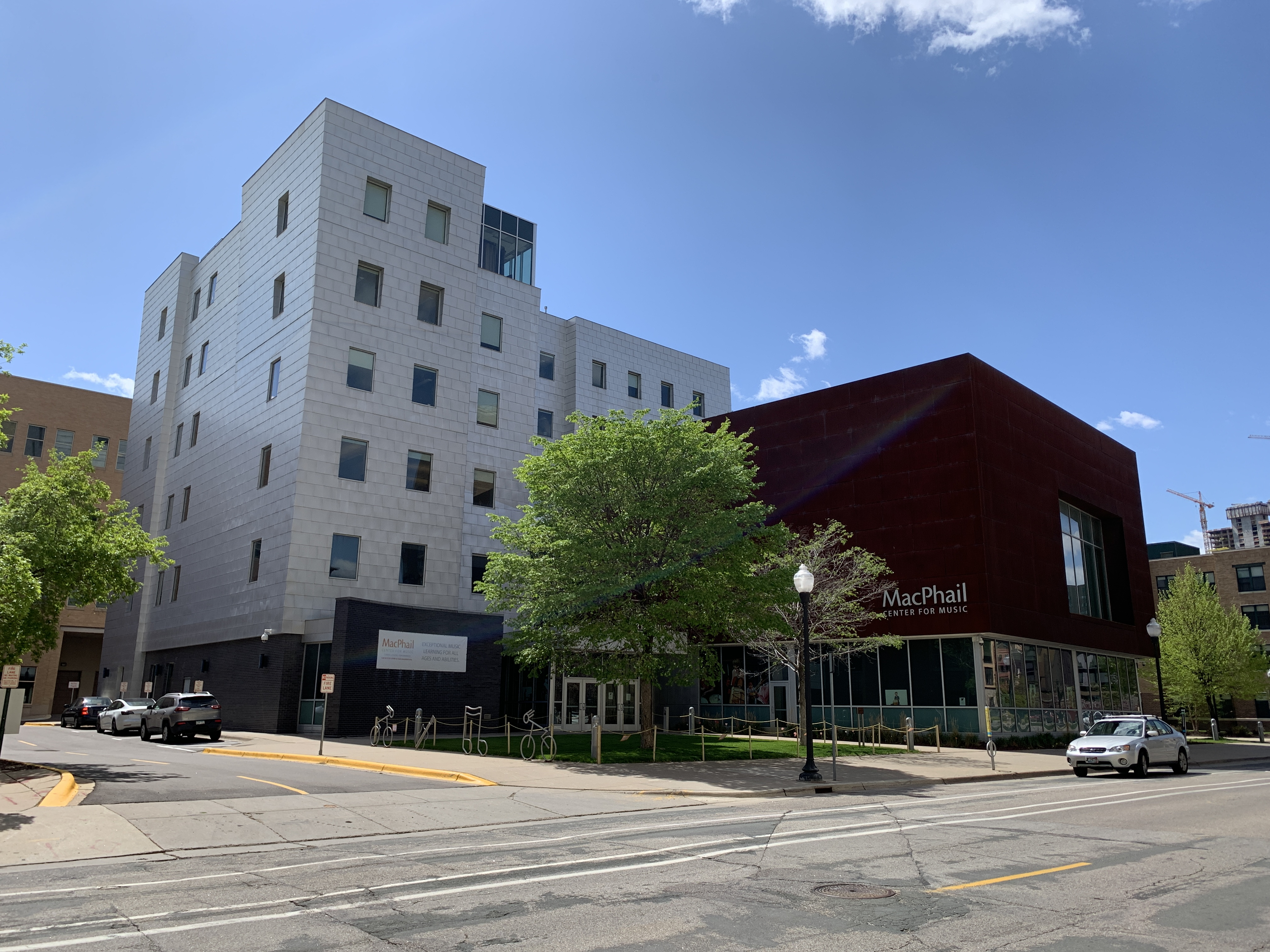
- 501 South 2nd Street; Minneapolis, Minnesota 55401; U.S.

Information
- Established: 1907
- Chief Executive Officer: Paul Babcock
- Enrollment: 16,000
- Campus: Urban
- Website: www.macphail.org

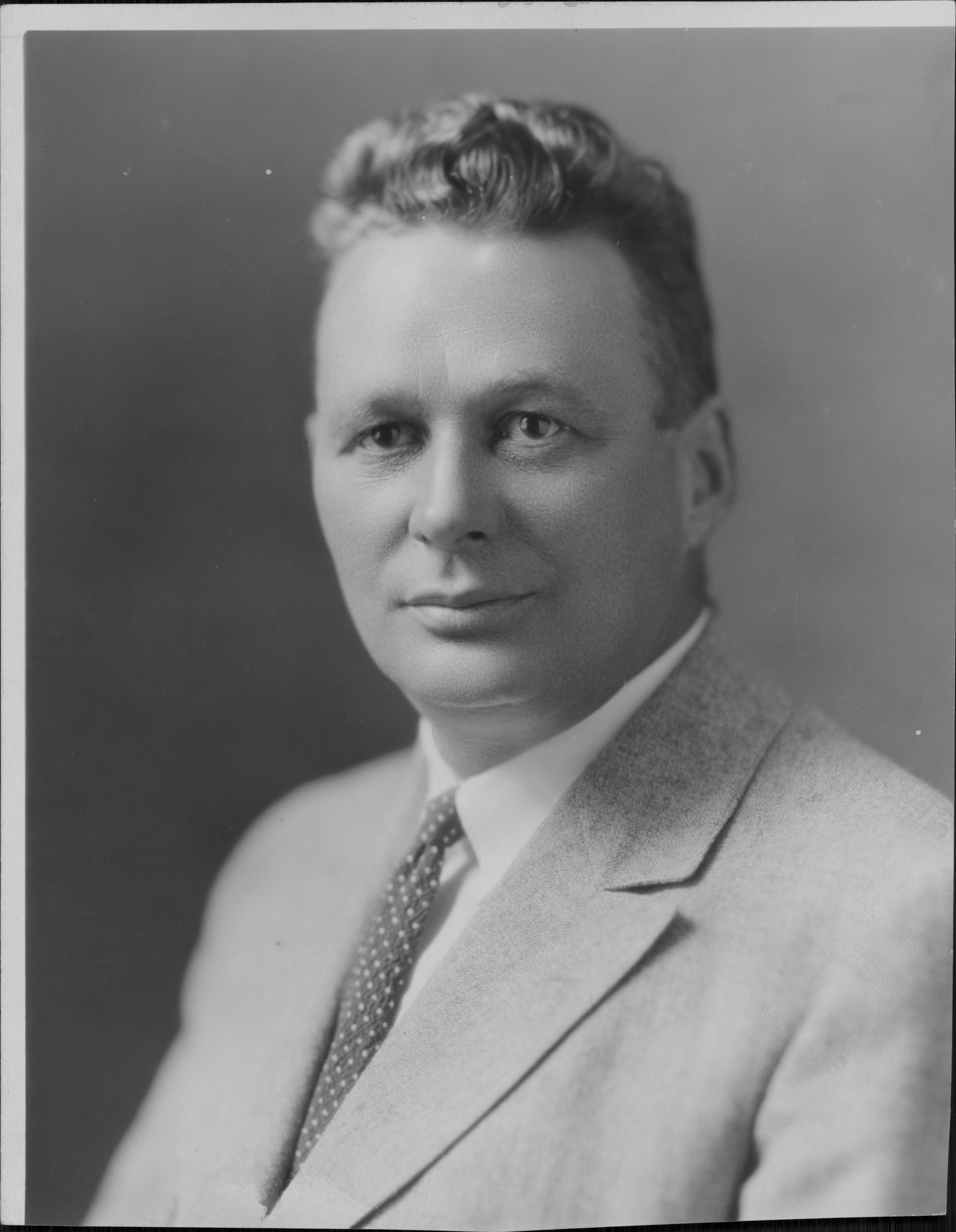
William S. MacPhail

The MacPhail Center for Music is a community music school located in the Mill District of the Downtown East neighborhood of Minneapolis, Minnesota. One of the oldest and largest community-based music education centers in the nation, MacPhail serves over 16,000 students and offers instruction at more than 130 locations beyond its downtown Minneapolis building, covering over 35 instruments and a variety of musical styles.

== History ==
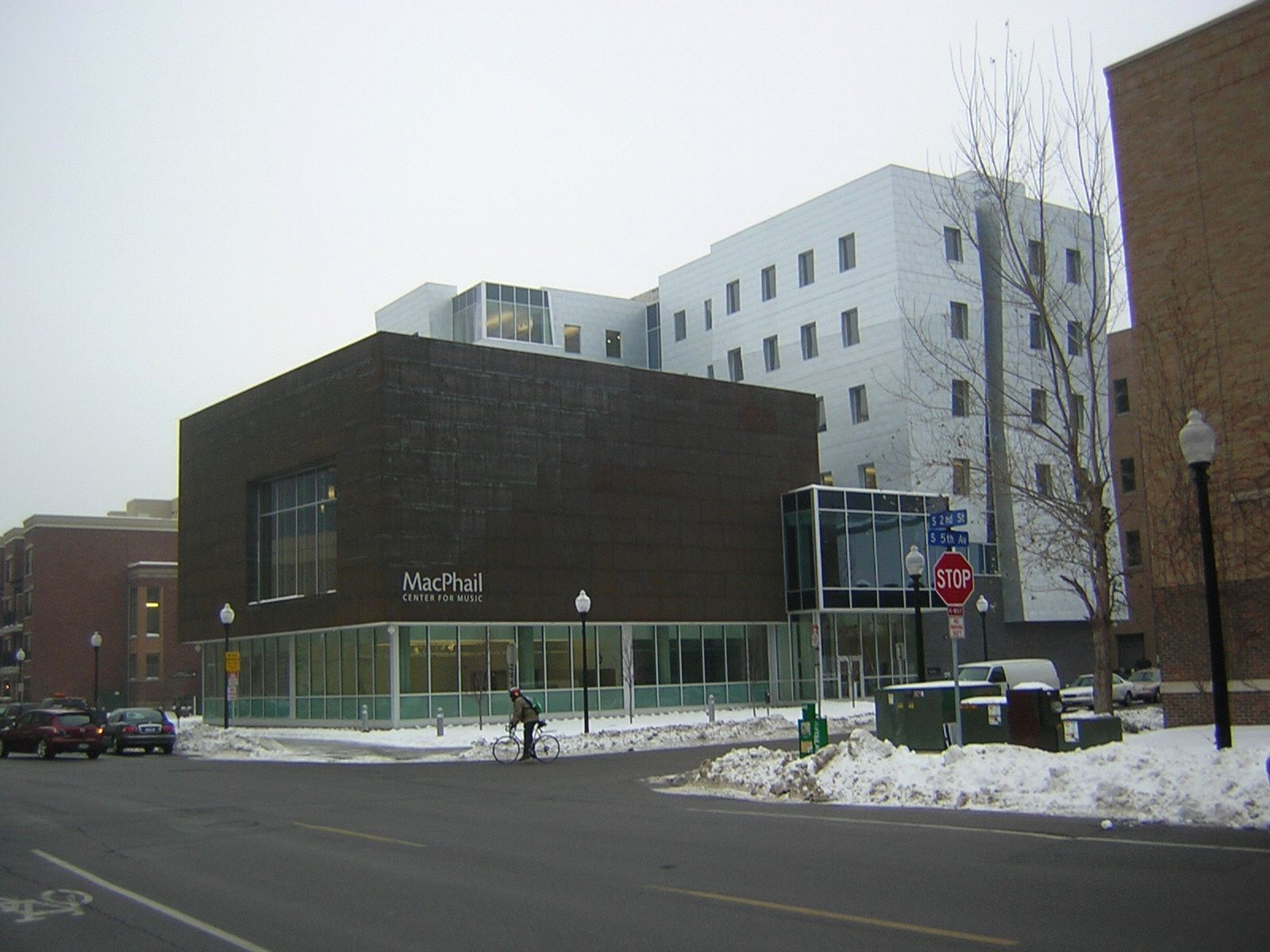
New home

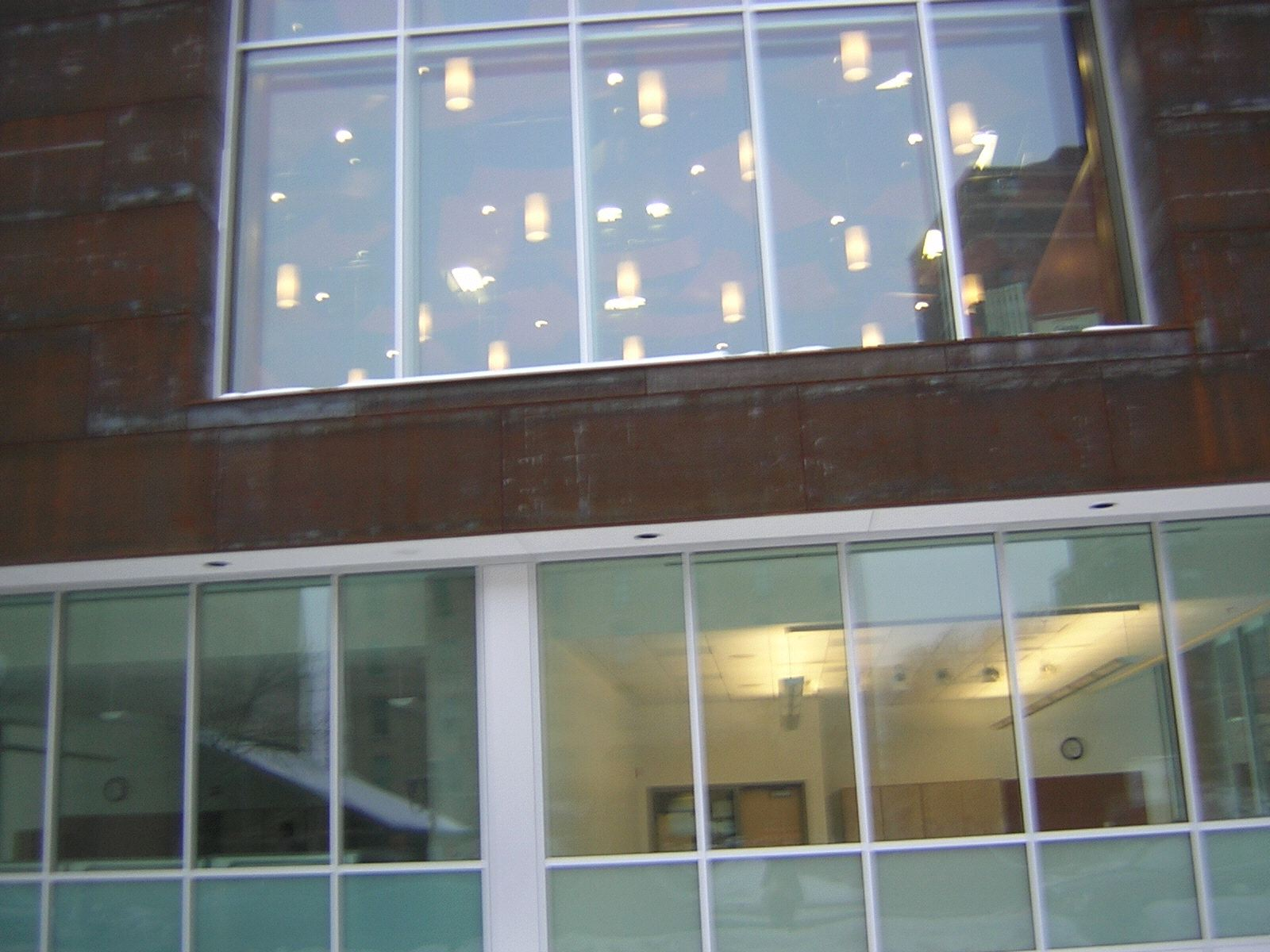
Close up of new home

In 1907, William S. MacPhail, an original member of the Minneapolis Symphony (now the Minnesota Orchestra), established the MacPhail School of Violin in Minneapolis. The school expanded its offerings and became the MacPhail School of Music and Dramatic Art. In need of more space, the school moved into 1128 LaSalle, a four-story building in downtown Minneapolis that, in order to meet the needs of a skeptical investor, could be easily converted into a retail/office space should the school fail. The building allowed the school to expand and offer conservatory education with college degrees, and after World War II, the GI Bill helped the school increase enrollment and offerings even further. By the time of its founder's death in 1962, the school had a faculty of more than 100 and a student body of more than 3,000.

In 1966, the MacPhail family gave the MacPhail College of Music to the University of Minnesota, which changed the name to the MacPhail Center for the Performing Arts. The school became part of the university's extension program and the emphasis shifted from conservatory instruction to community education. During its time with the university, the school began trying new methods of teaching young children, and in the late 1960s introduced one of the first Suzuki method programs in the nation. In 1987, the University of Minnesota announced it would dissolve relationships with institutions that did not primarily serve college students, and in 1994 the MacPhail Center for the Performing Arts again became a private, nonprofit school. In 2003, the organization changed its name to the MacPhail Center for Music.

The new facility on the Minneapolis riverfront was designed by James Dayton, who studied and worked with Gehry Partners.

== MacPhail today ==
MacPhail currently serves over 16,000 music students and music therapy clients ranging in age from 6 weeks to over 100 years old.

Beginning in the fall of 2006, MacPhail began offering its registration-based programming in Apple Valley at Paideia Academy and continued its expansion by opening a site at Birch Lake School in White Bear Lake in the fall of 2007. In January 2008, a new flagship facility opened in downtown Minneapolis. In January 2014, MacPhail opened its next access site in Chanhassen and began offering individual lessons at the Perpich Center for Arts Education in Golden Valley in January 2015. MacPhail offers the following programs:

- Individual Lessons (ages 5 – adult)
- Sing Play Learn with MacPhail (students ages 6 weeks – 8 years)
- Suzuki Talent Education (aka:Suzuki method) (ages 3 – 18)
- Classes (students ages 5 – adult)
- Ensembles (students ages 5 – adult)
- Music Therapy (all ages)
- Community Partnerships (all ages)
- Online Lessons (ages 5 – adult)
- Summer camps (ages 3 – adult)

== Notable people ==
=== Notable alumni ===
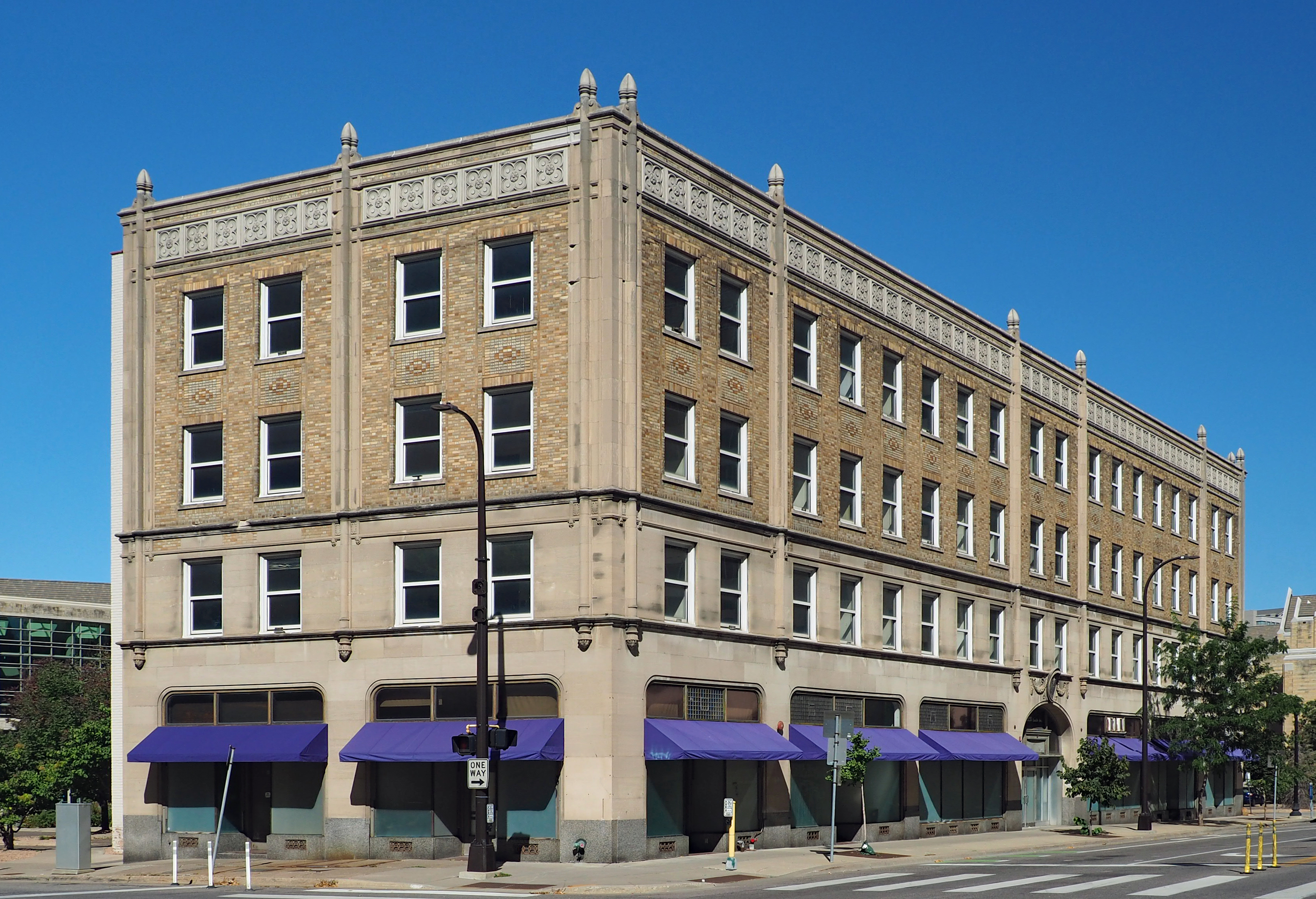
1128 LaSalle Avenue, the previous home of MacPhail, was designed to be easily converted into an office building should the school have failed.

- Gretchen Carlson
- Lon Clark
- Pete Docter
- Vincent Kartheiser
- David King
- Joan Kroc
- Norman J. Larson
- Lynn Freeman Olson
- Chan Poling
- Marion Ross
- James Sample
- Al Sheehan
- Palbasha Siddique
- Ann Sothern
- Lawrence Welk

=== Notable faculty ===
- Wilma Anderson Gilman
