= Downtown East, Minneapolis =

Coordinates: 44.9759°N 93.2545°W

Downtown East
- Neighborhood
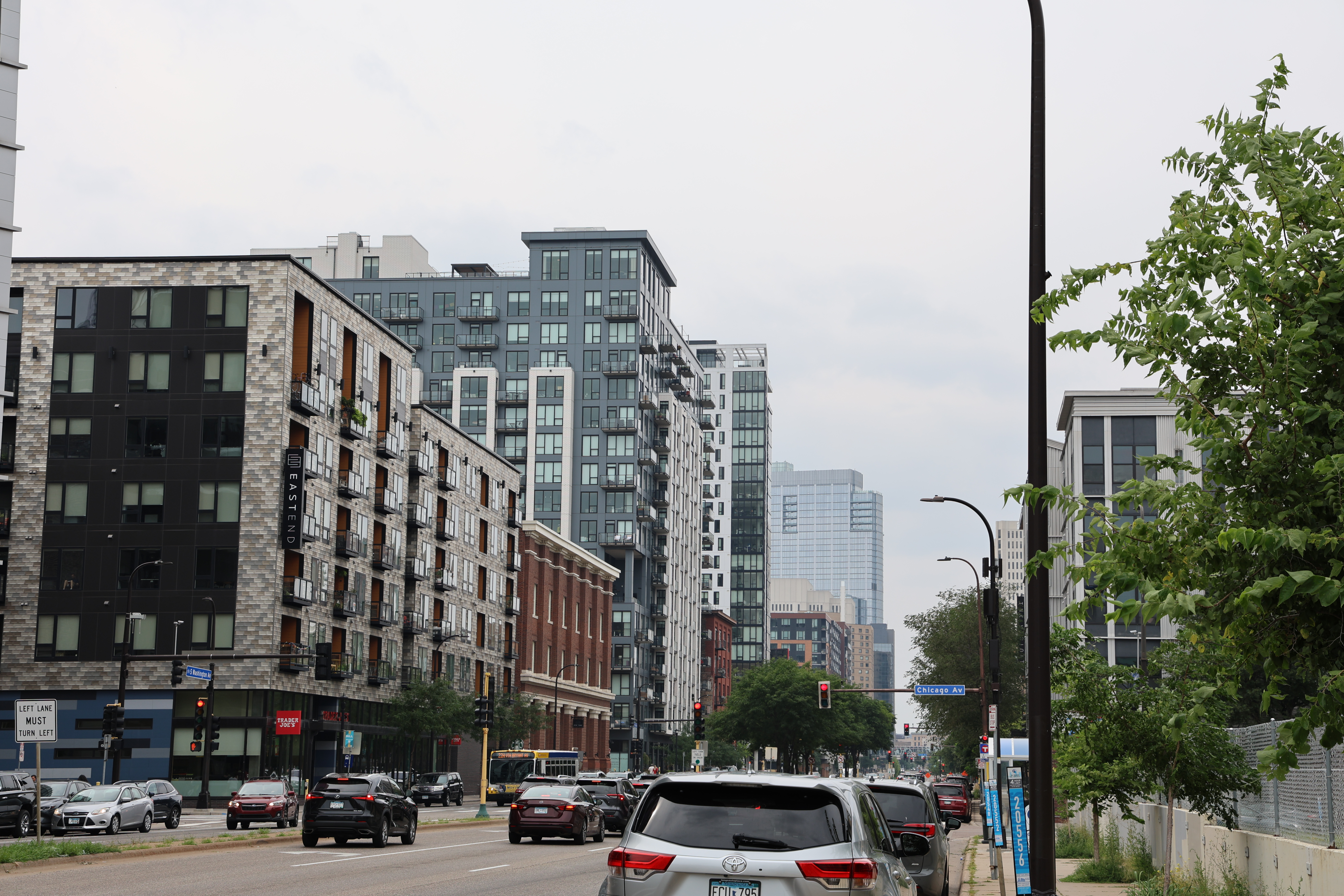
- Looking down Washington Avenue in 2025. Washington Avenue is a major corridor in the neighborhood.

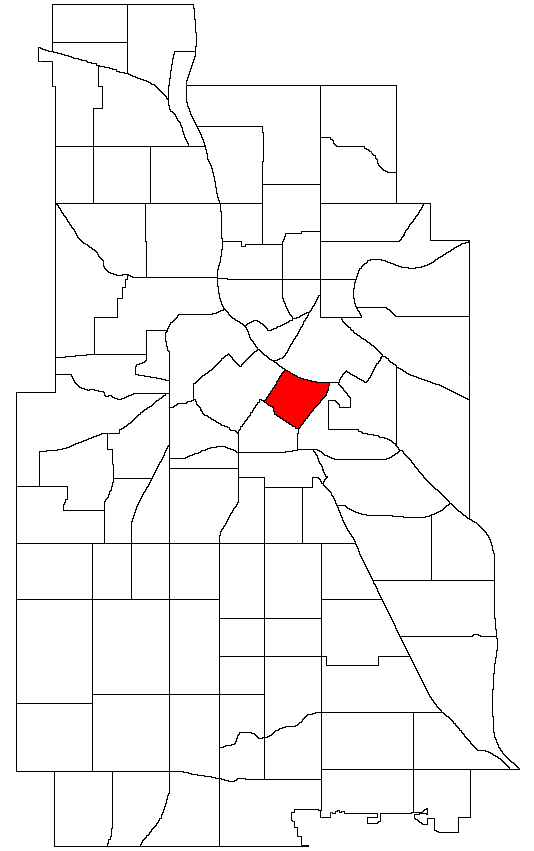
- Location of Downtown East within the U.S. city of Minneapolis
- Interactive map of Downtown East
- Country: United States
- State: Minnesota
- County: Hennepin
- City: Minneapolis
- Community: Central
- Founded: 1849
- City Council Ward: 3

Government
  - Council Member: Michael Rainville

Area
  - Total: 0.384 sq mi (0.99 km^{2})

Population (2020)
  - Total: 3,231
  - Density: 8,410/sq mi (3,250/km^{2})
- Time zone: UTC-6 (CST)
  - Summer (DST): UTC-5 (CDT)
- ZIP code: 55401, 55415, 55454
- Area code: 612

Downtown East is an official neighborhood in Minneapolis, Minnesota, United States. It is in Ward 3, currently represented by council member Michael Rainville.

Its boundaries are the Mississippi River to the north, Interstate 35W to the east, 5th Street South to the south, and Portland Avenue to the west. It is bounded by the Downtown West, Elliot Park, and Cedar-Riverside neighborhoods. The Marcy-Holmes neighborhood is on the other side of the river, but there is no direct automobile connection between the two neighborhoods. There is a pedestrian and bicycle connection via the Stone Arch Bridge.

Within Downtown East is the Mill District, which contains former industrial buildings left over from the days when Minneapolis was the flour milling capital of the world. Many of these old mills and factories are being converted to housing, bringing a residential population to a neighborhood that beforehand didn't have many residents. Because of this, the Mill District in Downtown East is one of the fastest growing areas of the city.

Historical population
Census	Pop.	Note	%±
1980	70		—
1990	25		−64.3%
2000	128		412.0%
2010	1,254		879.7%
2020	3,231		157.7%

== Demographics ==
Race/ethnicity
Race/ethnicity	2000		2010		2020	
Race/ethnicity	Number	%	Number	%	Number	%
White alone	77	60.16	827	65.95	2,396	73.38
Black alone	32	25.00	238	18.98	336	10.29
Hispanic or Latino (any race)	12	9.38	52	4.15	132	4.04
Native American alone	1	0.78	28	2.23	55	1.68
Asian alone	3	2.34	61	4.86	208	6.37
Other race alone	0	0.00	8	0.64	32	0.98
Pacific Islander alone	0	0.00	0	0.00	2	0.06
Two or more races	3	2.34	40	3.19	104	3.19
Total	128	100.0	1,254	100.0	3,265	100.0

== Attractions ==
- U.S. Bank Stadium, home to the Minnesota Vikings
- The Mill City Museum
- Mill Ruins Park
- Gold Medal Park
- Day Block Building
- The Guthrie Theater complex, which abandoned its old location near Loring Park during the summer of 2006.
- The west end of the Stone Arch Bridge
- The 35W Bridge Remembrance Garden
- Hubert H. Humphrey Metrodome (former), once home to Minnesota Golden Gophers football, the Minnesota Twins, and the Minnesota Vikings. In 2009, the Golden Gophers moved into the new TCF Bank Stadium on the University of Minnesota Campus. The Minnesota Twins moved into new Target Field at the start of the 2010 season. In 2016, U.S. Bank Stadium opened on the Metrodome's former site.

=== Transit ===
The neighborhood is served by U.S. Bank Stadium Station of the METRO light rail system.

== Gallery ==
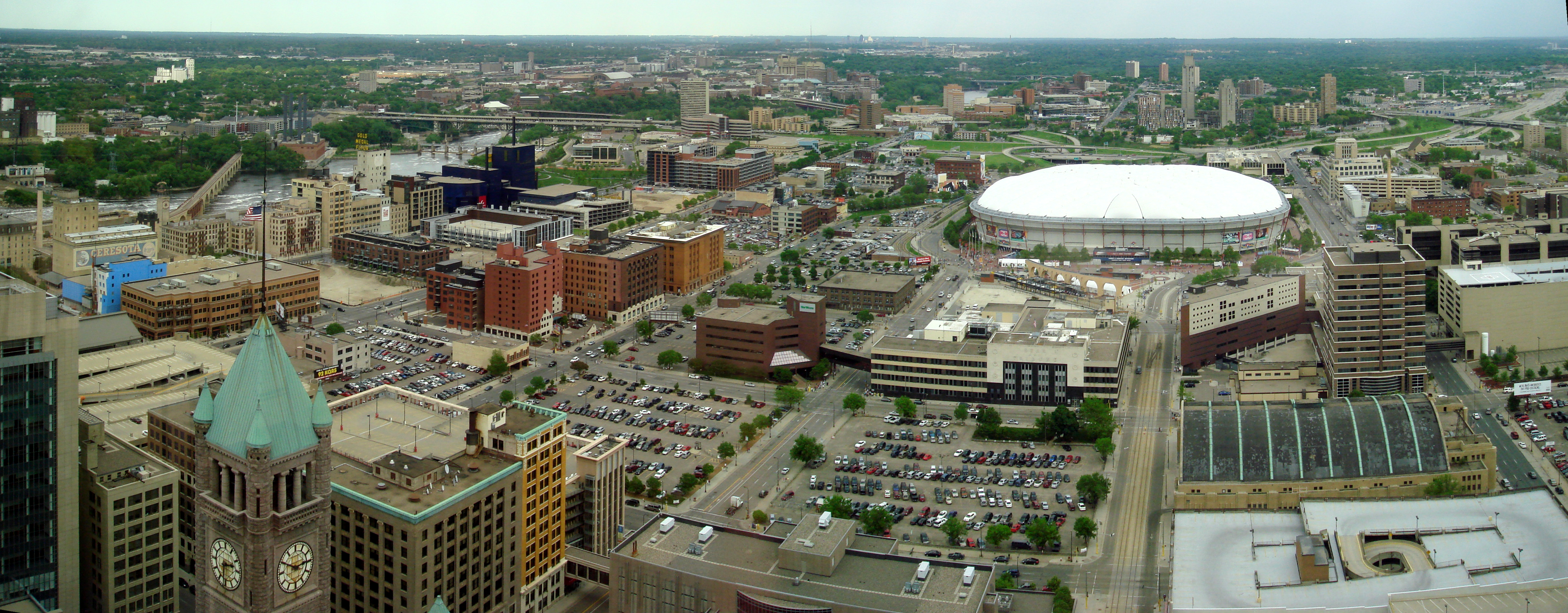
Downtown East: the arched bridge on the left is the Stone Arch Bridge crossing the Mississippi River; the dark blue building is the Guthrie Theater; the long straight span crossing the river behind it is the I-35W Mississippi River bridge which collapsed in August 2007. The domed stadium was the Metrodome; also in the photo is the headquarters of the Star Tribune, parts of Hennepin County Medical Center as well as several former mills (The clock tower in the foreground is a part of Minneapolis City Hall). The Downtown East/Metrodome Station sits by the arches in front of the Metrodome.
