= Mill District, Minneapolis =

Area in Minneapolis, Minnesota, United States

Coordinates: 44.978333°N 93.256389°W

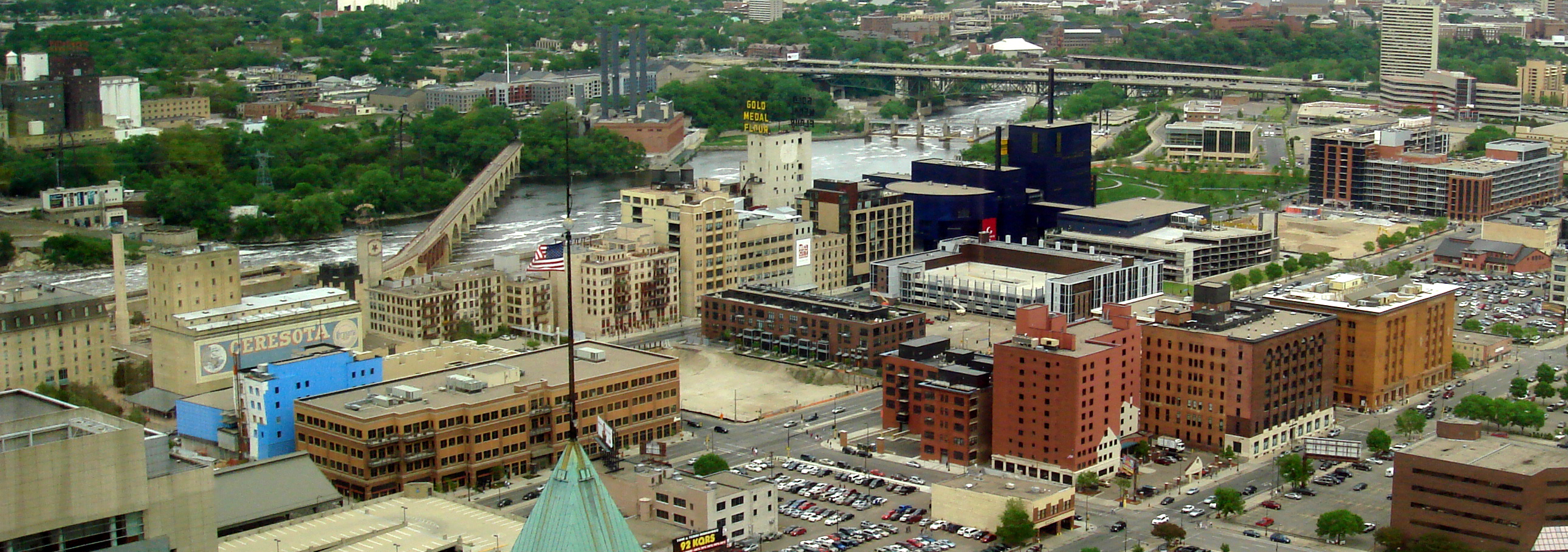
The Mill District, bounded on the northeast by the Mississippi River. Bridges seen are the I-35W Mississippi River bridge and Stone Arch Bridge

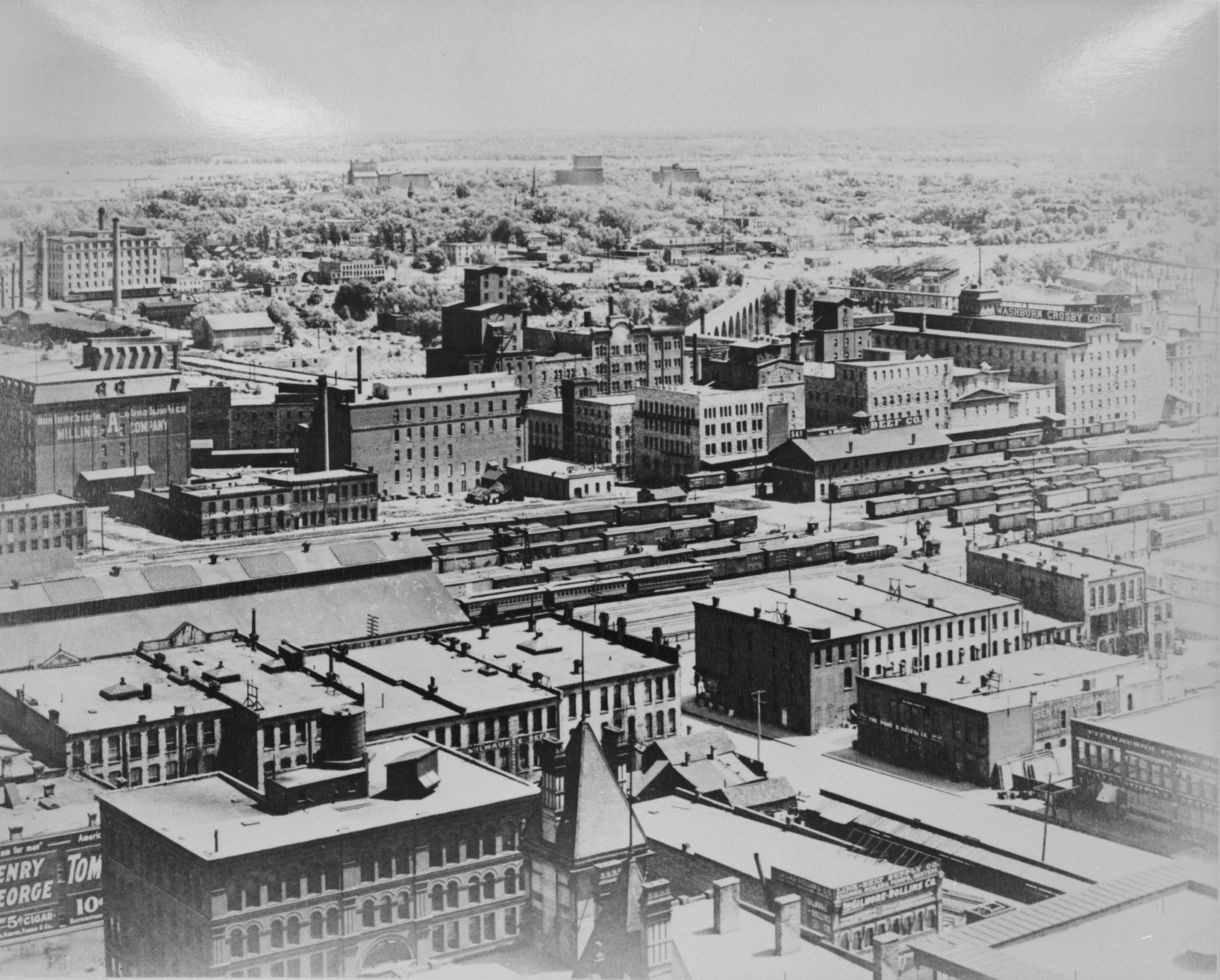
West Side Milling District c. 1905

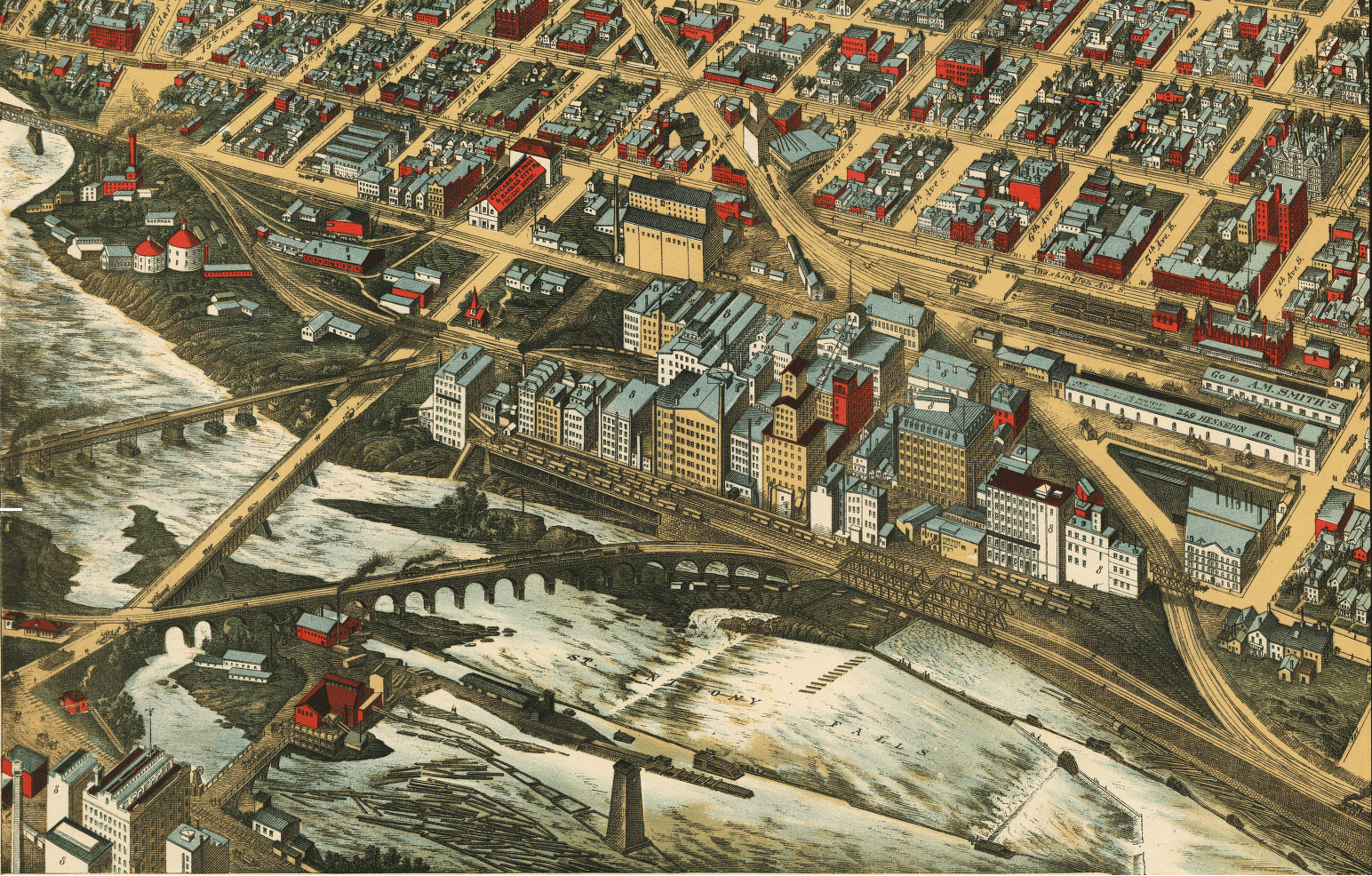
Lithograph of the Mills District, 1895

The Mill District is a redeveloped former industrial area within Minneapolis, Minnesota, United States, and a part of the larger Downtown East neighborhood. The area contains several former flour mills left over from the days when Minneapolis was the flour milling capital of the world. With almost none of the mills still active, a number of these have been converted into condominiums leading to a revitalization of the neighborhood.

Its approximate boundaries are the Mississippi River to the north, the I-35W Mississippi River bridge to the east, Washington Avenue to the south, and 5th Avenue to the west. It is bounded by Downtown West as well as the rest of the Downtown East neighborhoods. The Marcy-Holmes neighborhood is on the other side of the river, but there is no direct automobile connection between the two neighborhoods. There is a pedestrian and bicycle connection via the Stone Arch Bridge.

The area also includes several cultural institutions, including the Guthrie Theater, the Mill City Museum as well as the MacPhail Center for Music. The area includes Mill Ruins Park, the new Gold Medal Park as well as the headquarters for the McKnight Foundation.

== History ==
Industrial mills began to appear along the Mississippi River near Saint Anthony Falls in the early 19th century. Utilizing the natural water power provided by the falls as well as cutting edge technological advances – the area quickly made Minneapolis the milling center of the upper Midwest. Within decades, the riverfront was literally lined with flour mills – including future corporate giants General Mills and Pillsbury. At its zenith, Minneapolis' Mill District was the largest producer of flour in the world. The Mill District was part of the greater flour milling industry tied around Saint Anthony Falls. With mills stretching from the current Mill District to the other side of the Mississippi to Nicollet Island these mills prospered from the late-19th century to the 1930s.

In the late 1930s, as fossil fuels began to replace water power throughout the industry, Minneapolis' milling business declined and by the 1960s, most of the once-mighty flour mills on the West Bank had ceased production and were demolished or left vacant. The rail lines that had fed the mills were removed and turned into parking lots for the nearby Hubert H. Humphrey Metrodome.

In 1998, the City of Minneapolis enacted a Historic Mills District Master Plan, revised in 2000, to encourage development along the long-neglected stretch of riverfront. As a result, historic buildings were converted for adaptive reuse, bringing a residential population and offices to a neighborhood that beforehand had few residents.

Today, the Mill District has re-emerged as the historical and cultural center of Minneapolis. Many of the original flour mills have been saved and renovated into elegant loft homes and office spaces. The fortified ruins of the Washburn "A" Mill, once the largest mill in the world, has been transformed into the cornerstone of the Mill City Museum. Opened in 2003 this National Historic Landmark and museum features exhibits, artifacts, an observation deck, and boutique cafe. The renovated Milwaukee Road Depot is "a place for people again" with a popular ice rink in the old train shed. In 2006, the internationally acclaimed Guthrie Theater moved from its previous location near Loring Park. The MacPhail Center for Music moved its new campus to the neighborhood in 2007. The Mill City Farmers Market, an organic farmers market, was begun in 2006. In the same year the Day Block Building was renovated.

== See also ==
- Gold Medal Park
