= Day Block Building =

Coordinates: 44°58′30.2″N 93°15′11.2″W

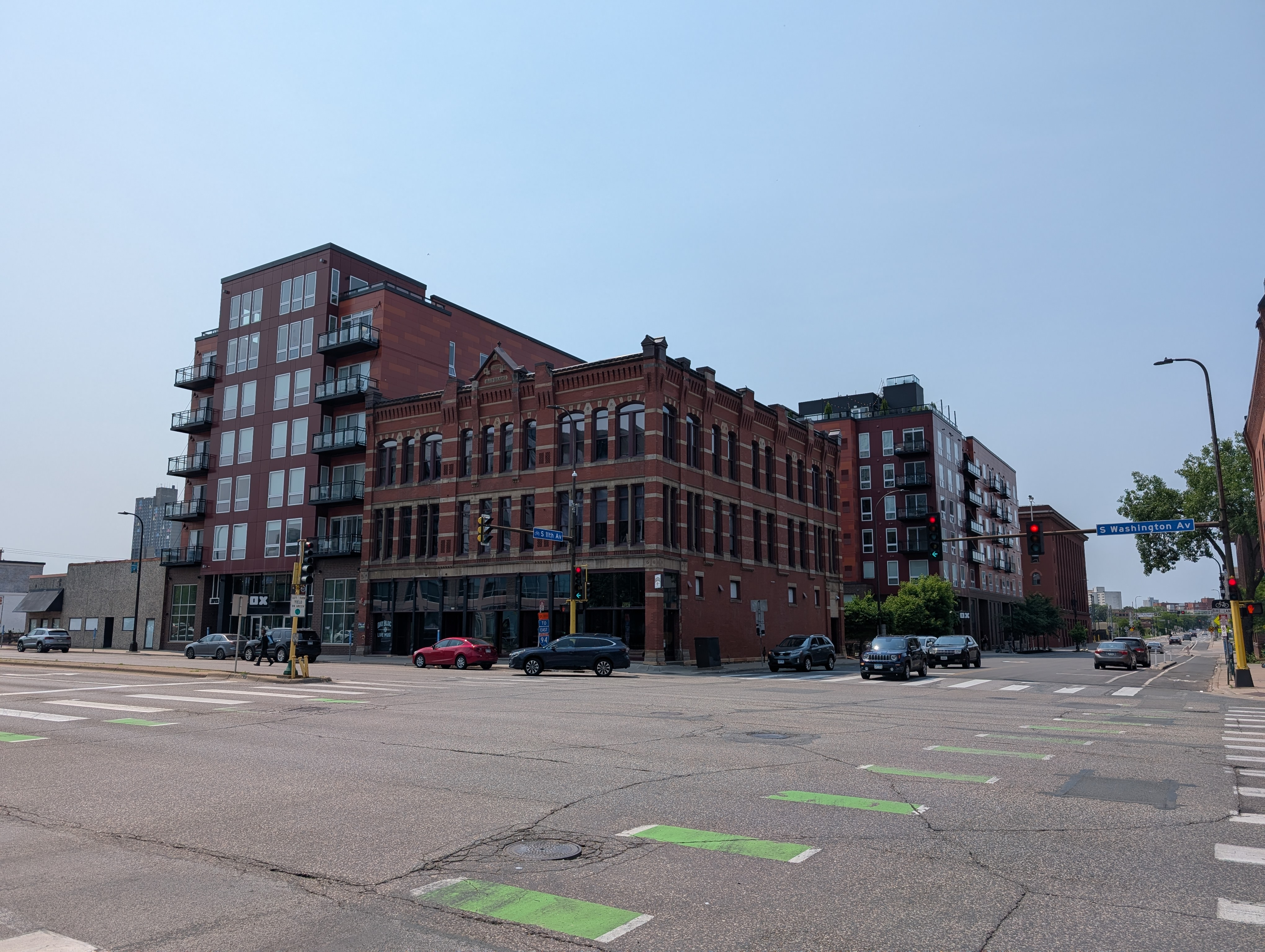
Picture of the Day Block Building

The Day Block Building is a historic building located in the Mill City District of Downtown Minneapolis, Minnesota at 1103 Washington Ave S. The property was built in 1883 by Leonard Day, a local businessman of the lumber and flour milling trade, who settled in Minneapolis in 1851.

Between 1880 and 1930, Minneapolis led the world's flour production, which resulted in the milling district being nicknamed "Mill City", a name still used today.

It is unknown what the purpose the building served before it became occupied by Peter O Melby, also known as P.O. Melby, who used the basement and ground floor for his furniture-making business, as well as his undertaking services. During this time, the second and third floors were used as a hospital which specialized in treating injuries and illnesses of mill and lumber workers who resided in the local area. This was an attractive proposition for these workers, who they were said to have been offered a $10-per-year health plan.

Throughout the mid-1900s, the building was occupied by a variety of different tenants. Frank's Plumbing occupied the building beginning in the early 1940s. The second and third floor were purposed as a local boarding house, where people could rent a room by the week. The building was also home to Oken Brothers, a local grocery supply store serving nearby residents and mill workers.

In April 2005, Jeff Hahn purchased the building and spent the next few years restoring it, making sure to retain its original Queen Anne character. In 2006, the third floor of the Day Block Building became home to Hahn's local web application development and internet marketing firm, Internet Exposure.

In 2009, the Day Block Event Center, a Minneapolis wedding venue, opened on the second floor. It quickly became a popular spot for weddings, private parties, and corporate meetings and events in the Downtown Minneapolis area. The venue is still in operation today.

In January 2014, Day Block Brewing, located on the building's ground floor, opened to the public as a local brewpub, brewing beer, seltzers, and non-alcoholic beverages like Kombucha and Kanna Tea as well as a full-service restaurant serving pizza, burgers, and wings. The restaurant has a focus on sourcing local and organic ingredients, and started growing hydroponic microgreens in 2026.

Today, the Day Block Building is located in the epicenter of the Downtown Minneapolis East neighborhood, near the former site of the Hubert H. Humphrey Metrodome, and now the US Bank Stadium (home of the Minnesota Vikings) and the Mill City Museum.
