= Lynn Freeman Olson =

American composer

Lynn Freeman Olson (June 5, 1938 – November 18, 1987) was an American composer. His music is used primarily for teaching the piano to youngsters. He was a popular presenter at workshops for piano teachers. He composed some music for radio and television programs for children. He authored college textbooks on piano pedagogy and edited collections of classical piano solos. He was himself a piano teacher and had many students over the years. He died of cancer at the age of 49. Decades after his death, his piano compositions are still regularly played at recitals and contests.

Born and raised in Minneapolis, Minnesota, Olson attended MacPhail School of Music before entering the University of Minnesota. His teacher at MacPhail was Cleo Munden Hiner who stressed an understanding of music theory. While Olson was at MacPhail, Hiner and her students came under the influence of the teachings of the famous piano pedagogue Frances Clark from Princeton, New Jersey. Olson left MacPhail at the age of 18 when he started the University of Minnesota in 1956. After graduating from the U. of M., he continued his studies there as a graduate student. While a graduate student, he worked for the school's radio station where he created the children's program "It's Time for Music". It was a weekly program that aired for three years. Olson composed over 200 original children's songs for the program. The program was re-aired widely over a 20-year period through tape recordings distributed by the Minnesota School of the Air. He then studied piano pedagogy with Frances Clark in Princeton, after which he opened his own piano studio at MacPhail in Minneapolis. His "Menagerie" was published in 1963. It was a piano book of easy tunes for children and became a best seller and brought fame to Olson. He moved to New York City, where he remained for the rest of his life. He taught piano for Frances Clark in Princeton for a time until he experienced a number of financial successes with his compositions. He wrote the music for the television program Captain Kangaroo. He became a consultant to the Carl Fischer Music publishing company. He later moved from Carl Fisher to the Alfred Music publishing company as their consultant. He composed over 1,200 piano solos many of which are still in print.
