= Gold Medal Park =

Park in Minneapolis, Minnesota, United States

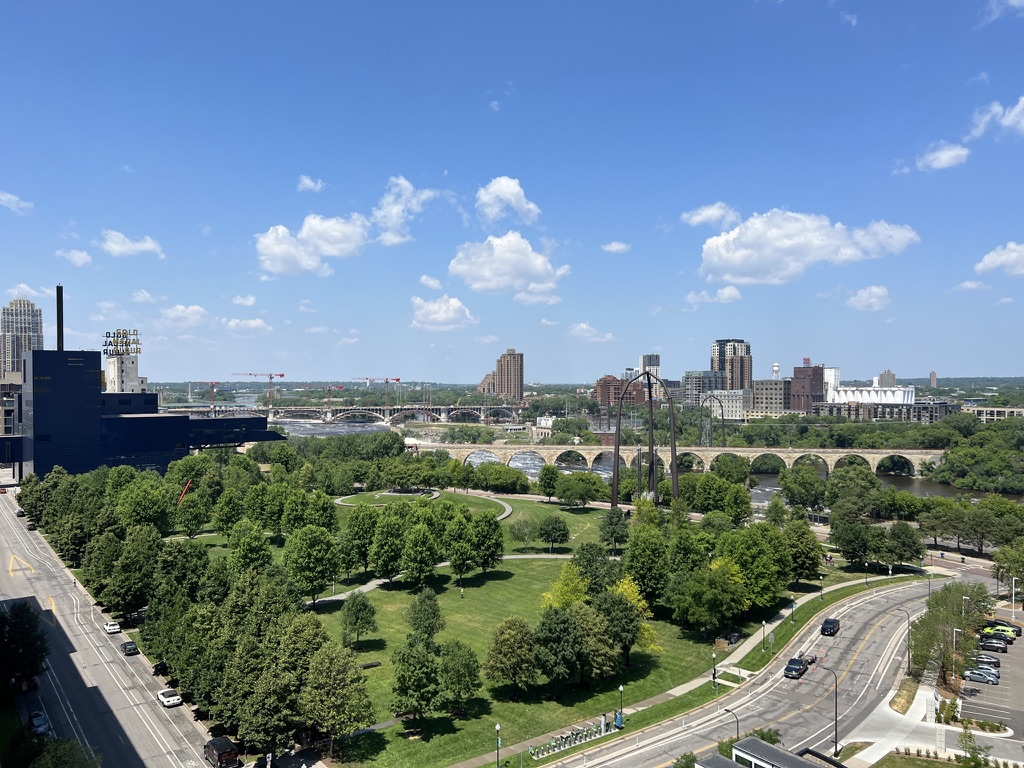
- Gold Medal Park in June 2022.
- Interactive map of Gold Medal Park
- Type: Urban park
- Location: Minneapolis, Minnesota
- Coordinates: 44°58′39″N 93°15′11″W
- Area: 7.5 acres (3.0 ha)
- Created: 2007
- Status: Open all year

Gold Medal Park is a 7.5-acre (3.0 ha) park in the Downtown East neighborhood of Minneapolis, Minnesota, United States. Opened in May 2007, the park was designed by landscape architect Tom Oslund and is owned by the city of Minneapolis. It takes its inspiration from the Native American mounds found throughout Minnesota, and its name from Gold Medal flour, a product of General Mills. It consists of a 32-foot-high (9.8 m) mound, reached by a spiral walkway rising out of a green lawn with 300 trees. The park, just east of the Guthrie Theater, gives the Mill District neighborhood some rare green space.

Built on a strip of land next to the Guthrie Theater and the Mississippi River, the park features specially designed luminescent benches, a prominent 32-foot (9.8 m) mound, and mature trees brought in from as far away as New Jersey.

Starting in 2007, the William W. and Nadine M. McGuire Family Foundation leased the land for 10 years from the city of Minneapolis and the Guthrie, each of which owns about half the property. In 2014, the Gold Medal Park Conservancy purchased the majority of the parkland owned by the Guthrie, then secured a 50-year lease for the rest of the land, owned by the City of Minneapolis.

Across the street from the park and adjacent to the river is Remembrance Garden, a tribute to the victims of the I-35W Mississippi River bridge collapse. It was dedicated on August 1, 2011, the fourth anniversary of the collapse.

== Art ==
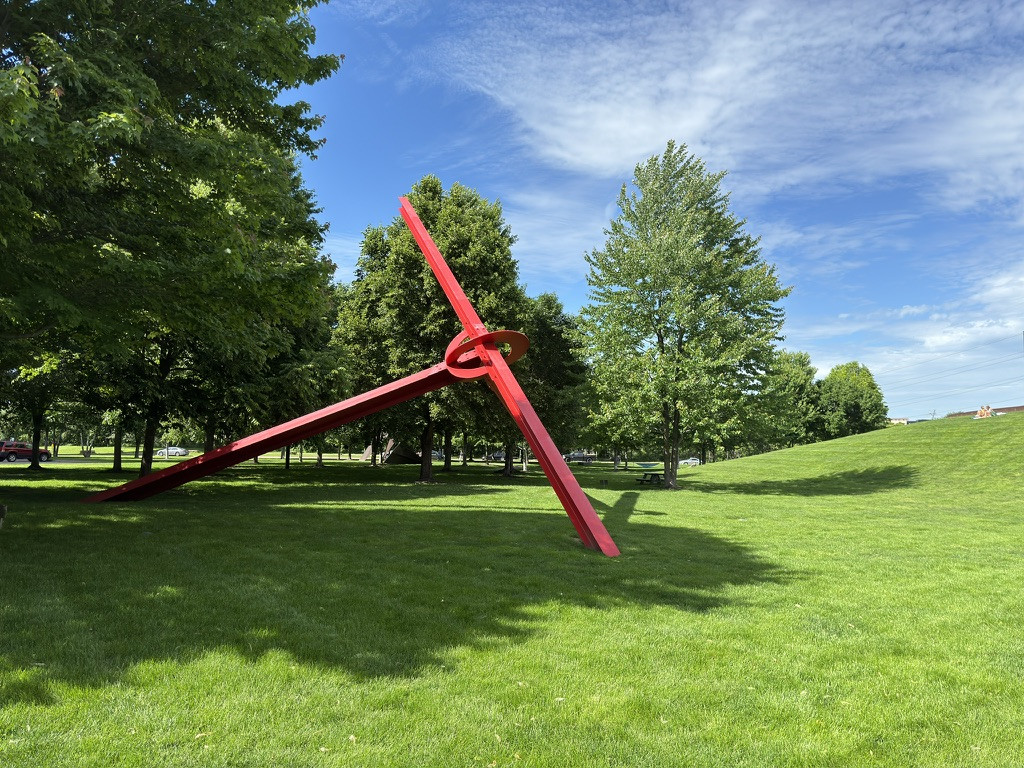
Molecule by Mark di Suvero in 2024.

In February 2015, the Walker Art Center loaned a number of sculptures from the institution’s collection on view in the Minneapolis Sculpture Garden to the Weisman Art Museum, the Minneapolis Institute of Art, and Gold Medal Park. This was announced as temporary, but has become permanent, with sculptures still on view in Gold Medal Park as of 2025.

=== Public art on view in Gold Medal Park ===
- Prophecy of the Ancients by Brower Hatcher
- Molecule by Mark di Suvero
- Ordovician Pore by Tony Cragg

== Gallery ==
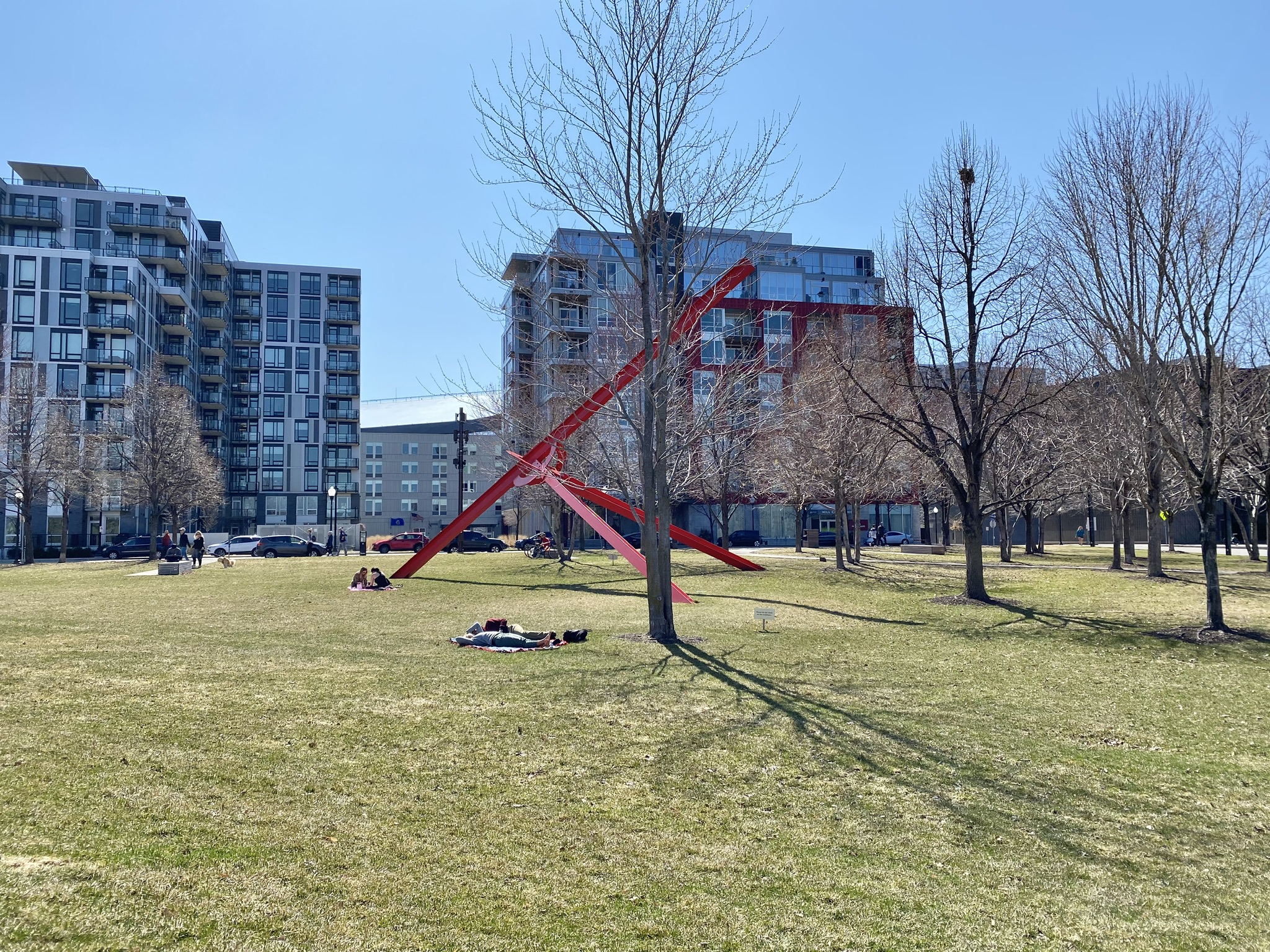
The park in spring.

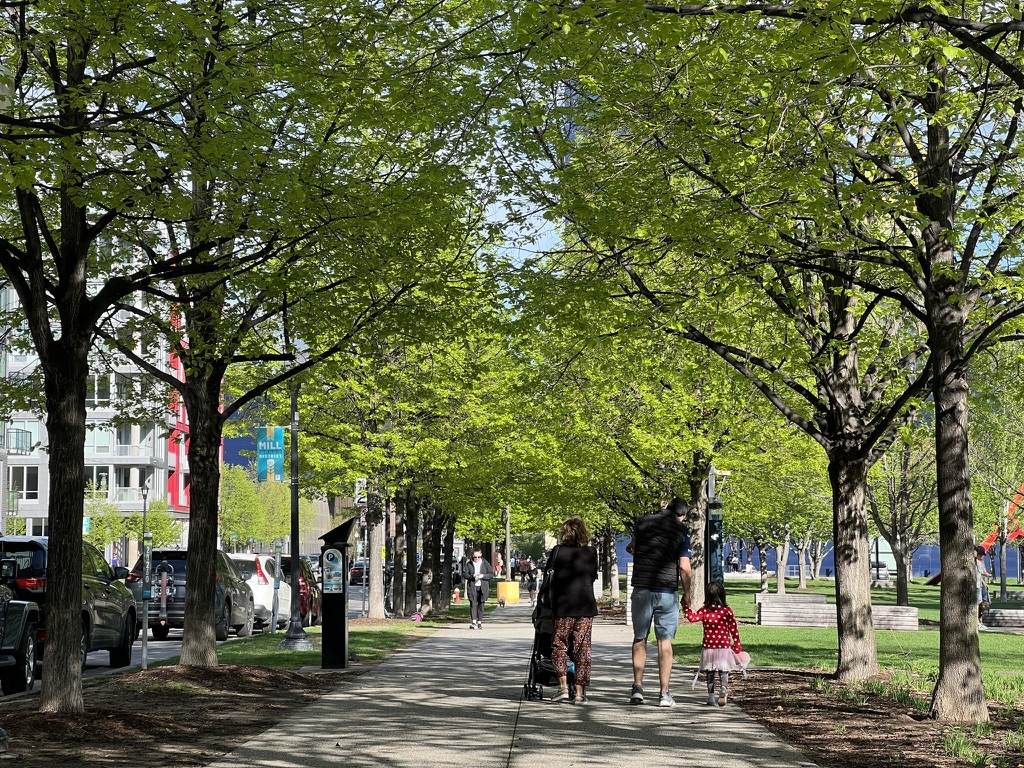
Tree canopy in summer.

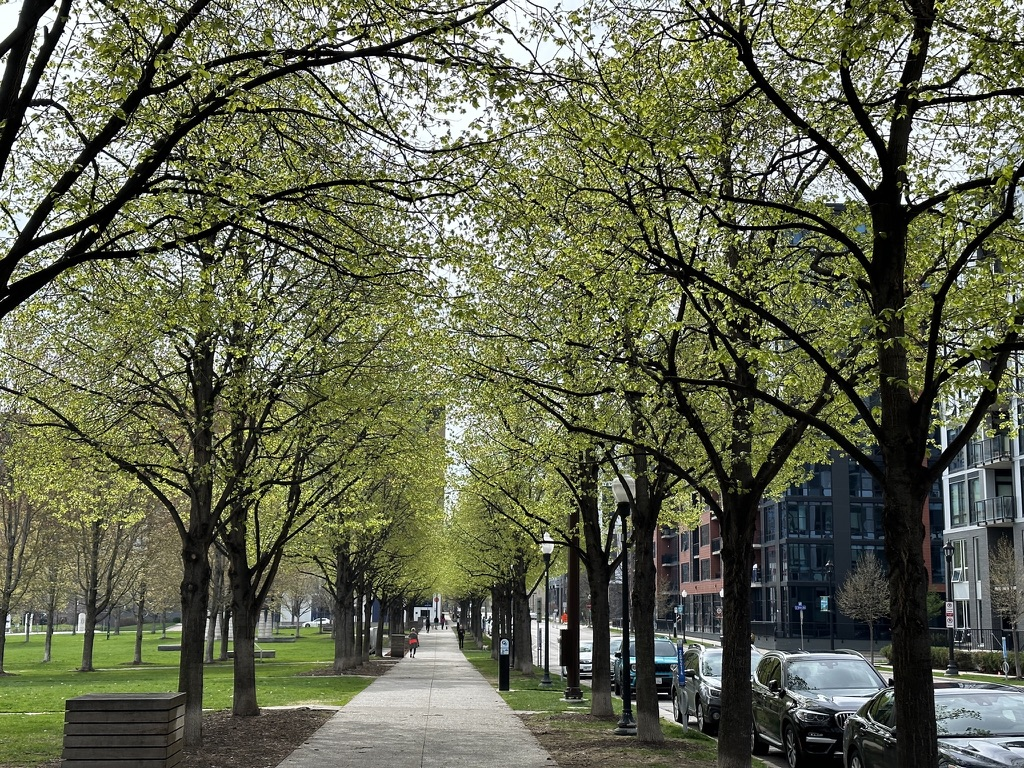
Tree canopy in spring.

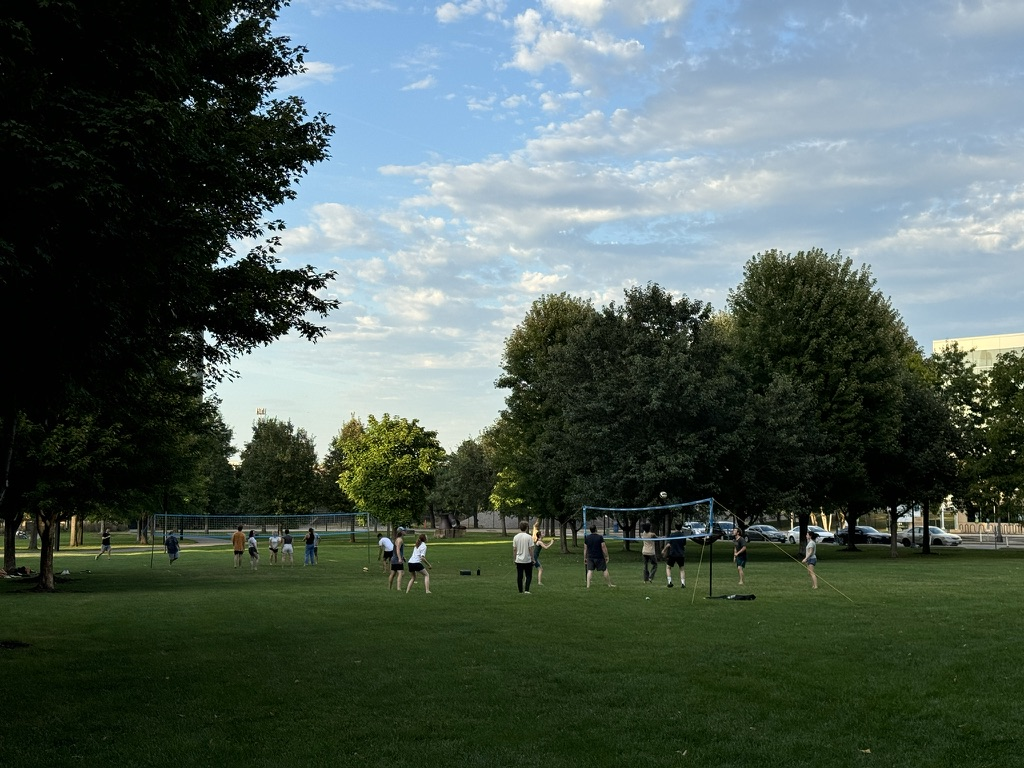
Park in late summer.

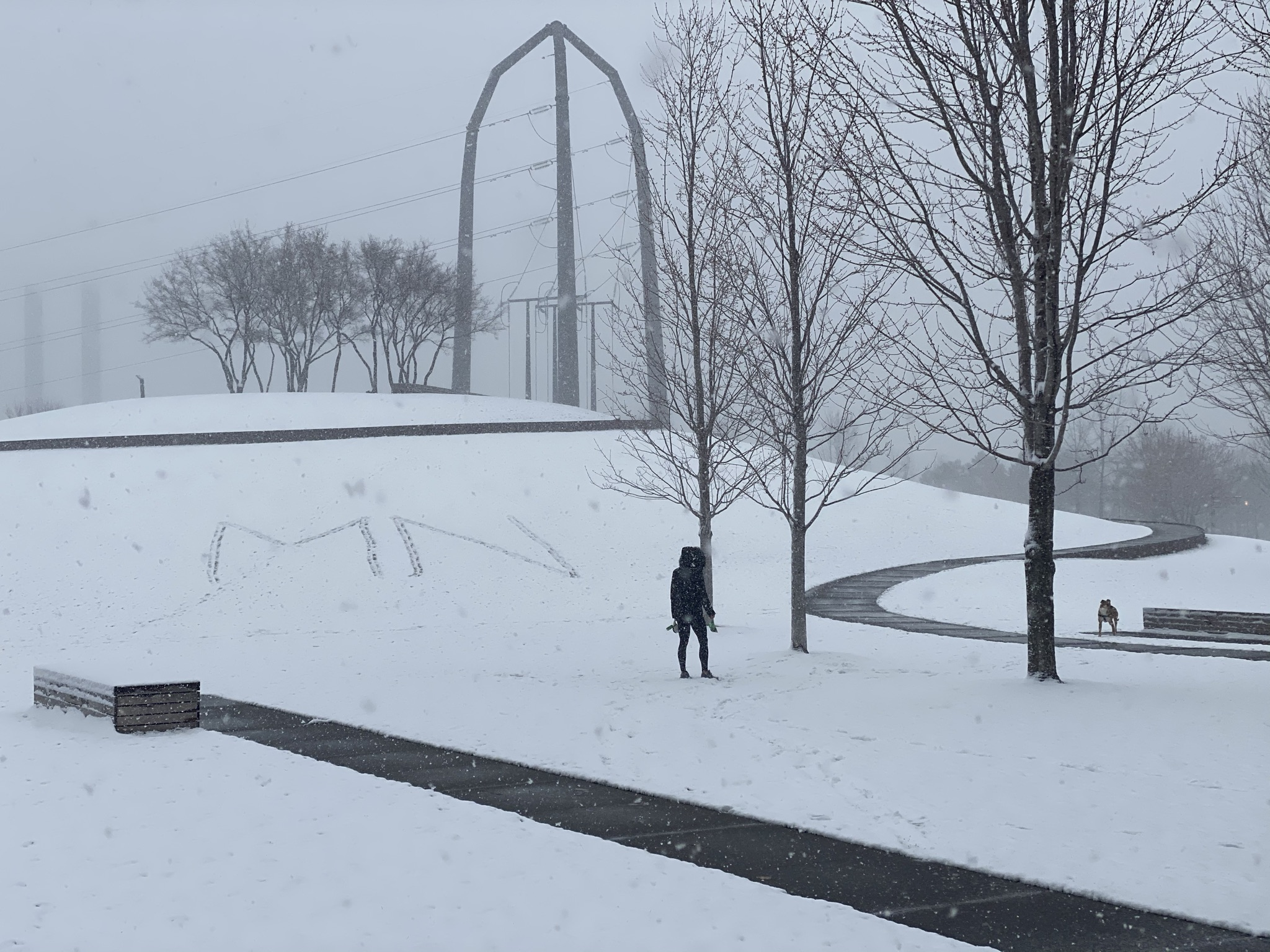
Park during a winter snowstorm.

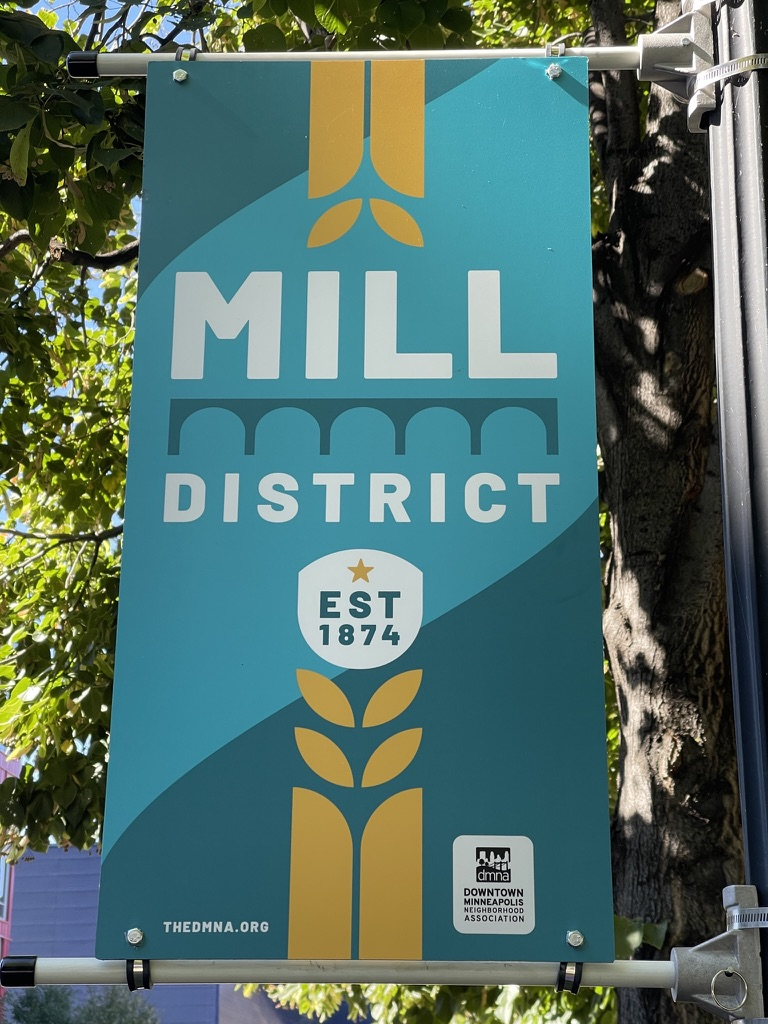
Mill District placemaking sign.

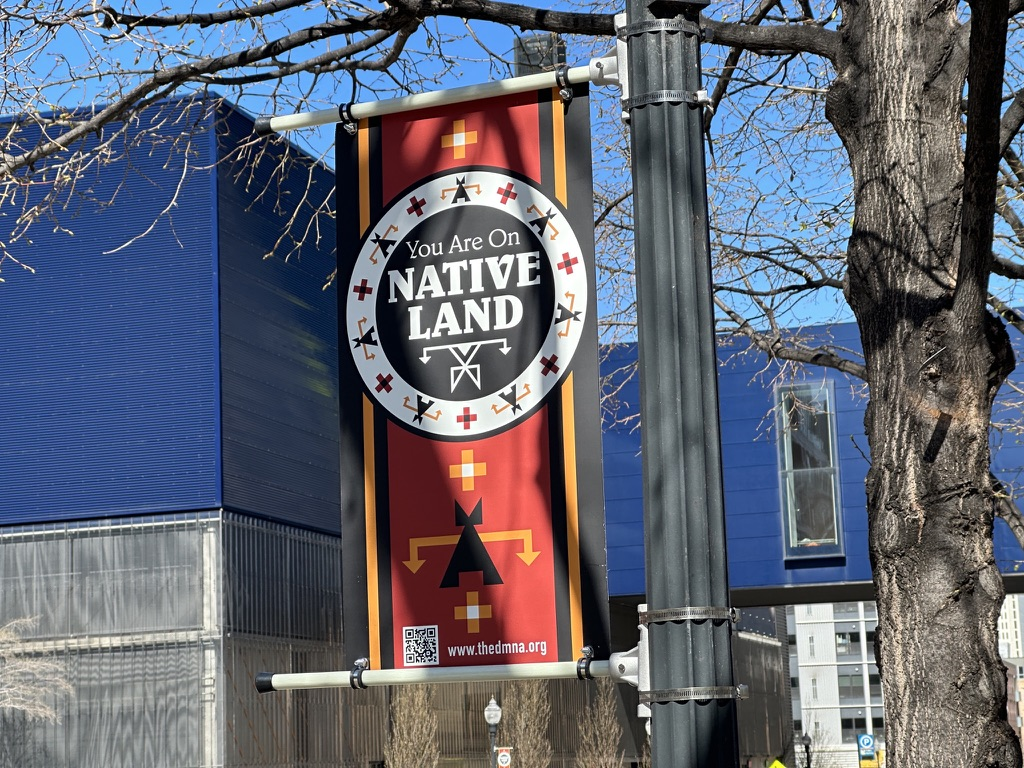
Native Land placemaking sign.

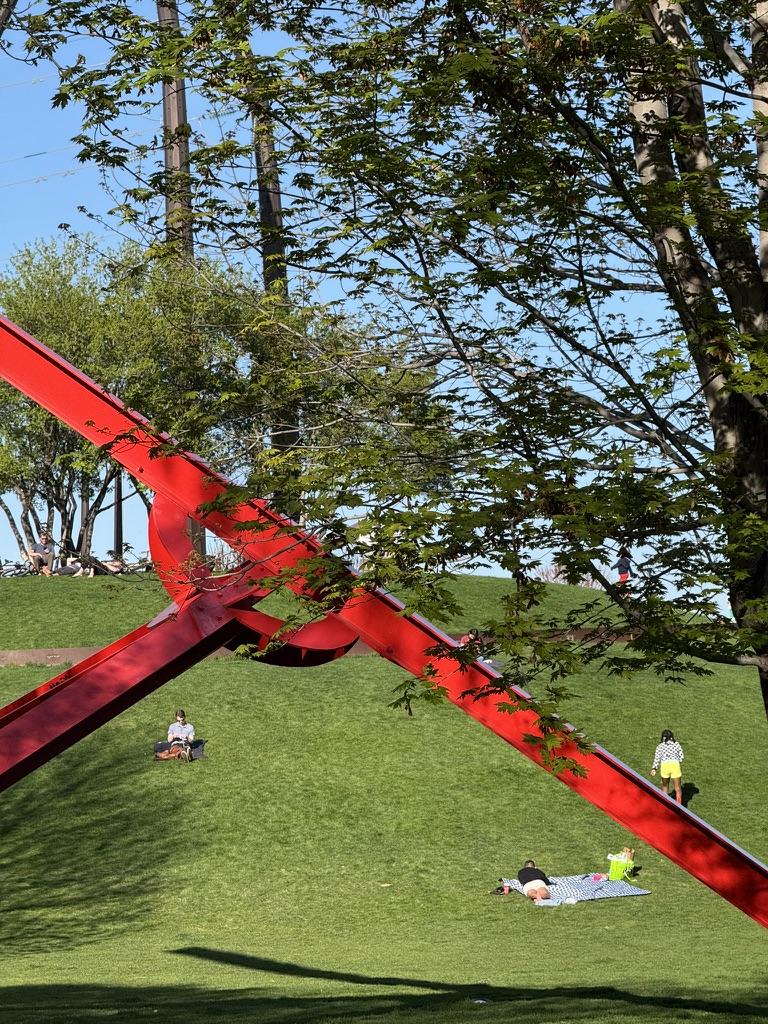
Molecule by Mark di Suvero.
