= Stone Arch Bridge (Minneapolis) =

Bridge crossing the Mississippi river in Minnesota, United States

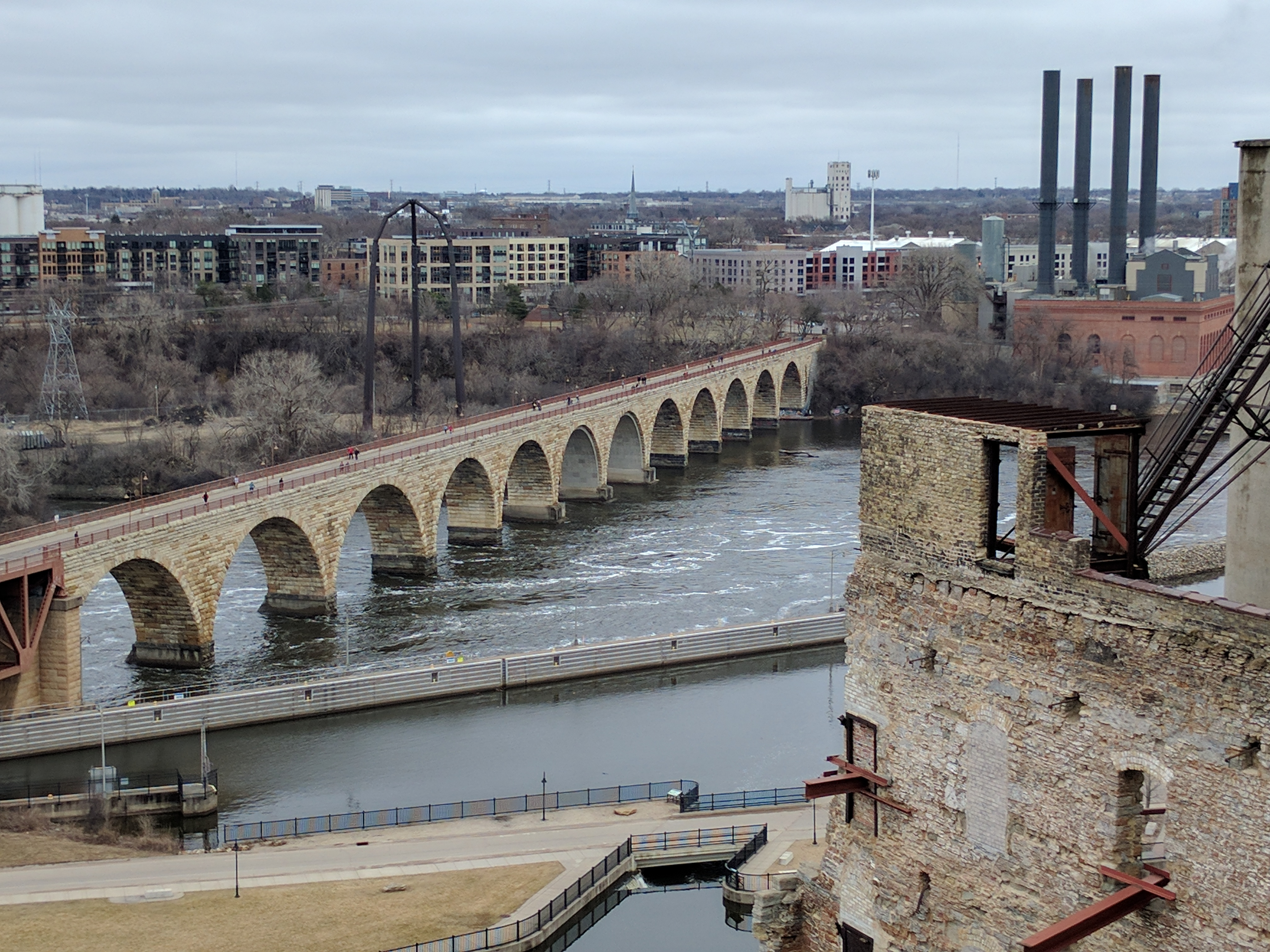
- A view of the bridge from downtown Minneapolis
- Coordinates: 44°58′51″N 93°15′13″W
- Carries: Pedestrian and bicycle lanes; formerly two tracks of the Great Northern Railway
- Crosses: Mississippi River
- Locale: Minneapolis, Minnesota
- Maintained by: Minneapolis Park Board
- ID number: 27004

Characteristics
- Design: 21 stone arch spans, plus one steel-deck truss span
- Total length: 2,100 feet (640 meters)
- Width: 28 feet (8.5 meters)
- Longest span: 197.5 feet (60.2 meters) (channel span)
- Clearance below: 24.4 feet (7.4 meters)

History
- Opened: 1883
- Stone Arch Bridge
- U.S. Historic district – Contributing property
- Location within Minnesota Location within the United States
- Location: Minneapolis, MN
- Part of: St. Anthony Falls Historic District (ID71000438)
- Designated CP: March 11, 1971

Location
- Interactive map of Stone Arch Bridge

The Stone Arch Bridge is a former railroad bridge crossing the Mississippi River at Saint Anthony Falls in downtown Minneapolis, Minnesota. It is the only arched bridge made of stone on the entire Mississippi River. It is the second oldest bridge on the river next to Eads Bridge. The bridge was built to connect the railway system to the new Union Depot, which at that time was planned to be built between Hennepin Avenue and Nicollet Avenue. The bridge was completed in 1883, costing $650,000 at the time ($22.5 million today). 117 Portland Avenue is the general address of the historic complex.

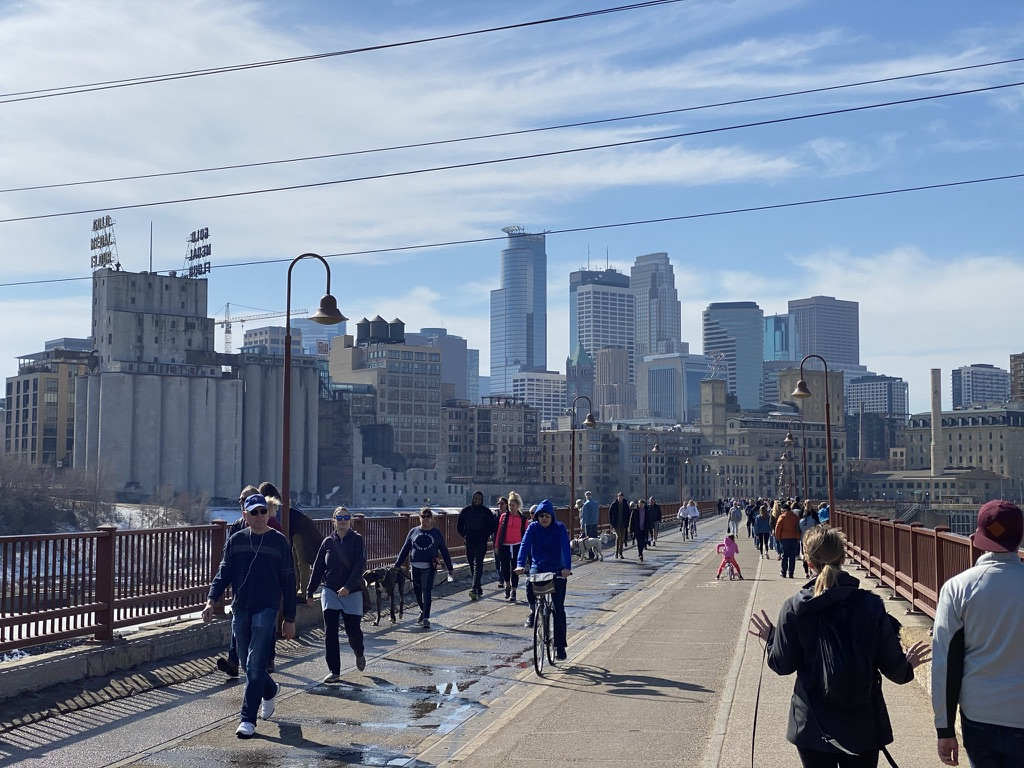
Stone Arch Bridge in 2020.

Located between the 3rd Avenue Bridge and the I-35W Saint Anthony Falls Bridge, the Stone Arch Bridge was built in 1883 by railroad tycoon James J. Hill for his Great Northern Railway, and accessed the former passenger station located about a mile to the west, on the west bank of the river. For a time, the bridge was dubbed "Hill's Folly" until the value of Hill's new bridge as a passenger rail link became evident.

The structure is now used as a pedestrian and bicycle bridge. It was added to the National Register of Historic Places in 1971 as a part of the Saint Anthony Falls Historic District, (District #71000438). The bridge was designated as a National Historic Civil Engineering Landmark in 1974.

== History ==
In 1880, Minneapolis was a bustling city with major commerce mostly located on the west bank of the Mississippi River, while smaller, up-and-coming businesses were on the east. With the merging of the Village of St. Anthony on the east side, Minneapolis continuously grew in population, and the Hennepin Avenue suspension bridge served as the sole thoroughfare for commuters and pedestrians. At that time, the Hennepin Avenue bridge was overused and in desperate need of upkeep. The city's network of railroads, which was crucial for urbanization, was also located on the east side of the river. With the rapid increase in commercialization, Minneapolis businessmen sought a plan to accommodate the heavy flow of traffic, and immediately considered the railroad mogul James J. Hill for the task. The idea was to build a railroad depot, similar to the St. Paul Union Depot, along the intersections of Hennepin Avenue and Nicollet Avenue in downtown Minneapolis, which would also connect to the Manitoba Road tracks, eventually developing into the Great Northern Railway.

Stone Arch Bridge under construction

The initial planning was conducted during a meeting held near the end of 1881. The project would include building a terminal in downtown Minneapolis and connecting the rails to the Manitoba Railway, the execution for which was accomplished by the Minneapolis Union Railway company, a team that was built for the sole purpose of overseeing the project. The stockholders met for the first time immediately the following year and Col. Charles C. Smith was selected as the head engineer.

The bridge has been altered somewhat from its original appearance. When the Upper Lock and Dam were built at Saint Anthony Falls, two of the arches were replaced with a moveable truss so barges could pass through the lock. Later, in 1965, flood waters undermined three of the piers and caused the bridge to sag fourteen inches. The bridge was repaired by strengthening the piers and reinforcing underneath two of the arches.

When it was in rail service, the bridge carried trains of many railroads to and from the Minneapolis Great Northern Depot, including the Great Northern Railway's Empire Builder. The bridge ceased to be used as a railroad bridge in 1978, and after a period of disuse, was repaired and adapted in the early 1990s to its present use. The bike and walking trails across the bridge are integrated into the city's park and trail system, and form part of the St Anthony Falls Heritage Trail, which includes interpretive plaques describing the history of the area. The most recent renovations—including indirect lighting—were completed in late 2005. The lighting was paid for by private donations.

During the summer months, the Stone Arch Bridge is a focus of numerous festivals in the area of St. Anthony Main and Historic Main Street. The Stone Arch Festival of the Arts occurs Father's Day weekend and features many local artists. Fireworks displays on the Fourth of July and during the Minneapolis Aquatennial in late July also bring crowds; fireworks are launched from nearby Hennepin Island. The bridge offers views of the Minneapolis skyline, Pillsbury "A" Mill, the Mill City Museum, and many other places in the district, and is near both the restaurants of Main St SE and the Guthrie Theater.

=== Timeline ===
The Minnesota Historical Society and the Great Northern Railway provided the following important historical timeline:

1881 - James J. Hill commissioned the Stone Arch Bridge project

1882 - The initial stockholders meeting was held and Col. Charles C. Smith was assigned as the construction's head engineer

1883 - After 22 months of intensive work, the Stone Arch Bridge was completed

1885 - The Union Depot at the heart of Minneapolis was completed and substantially increased the passenger volume

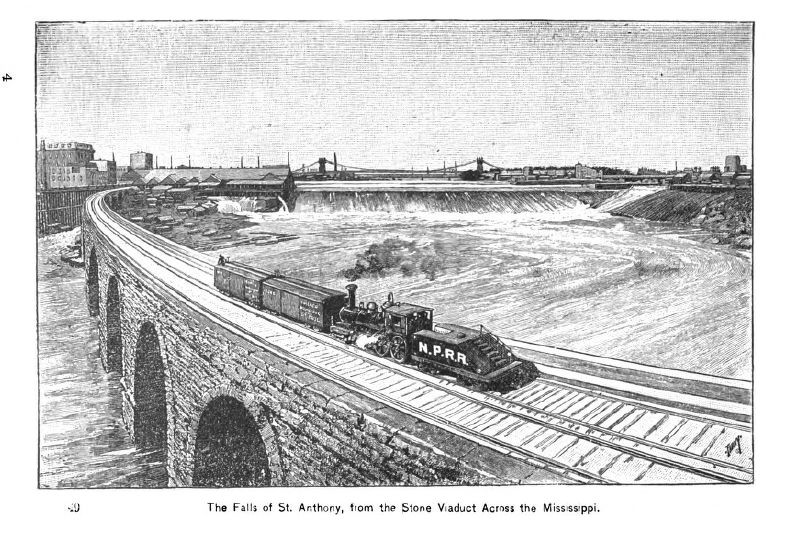
An illustration of Saint Anthony Falls and the Stone Arch Bridge from the 1893 book The Official Northern Pacific Railroad Guide

1907-1911 - Renovations were done to improve the bridge's drainage system and strengthen its structural support in order to transport heavier loads

1913 - The new Great Northern Depot, north of Hennepin Avenue, replaced the Union Depot

1925 - Another renovation conducted to increase the width to allow bigger trains that would house more passengers

1961- 1963 - The lock and dam was built at St. Anthony falls which required arch number 13 and 14 to be replaced with a 200-foot Warren truss and allow barges to pass

1965 - The bridge underwent renovation when the Mississippi River flooded, causing the seventh pier to sink about 14 inches

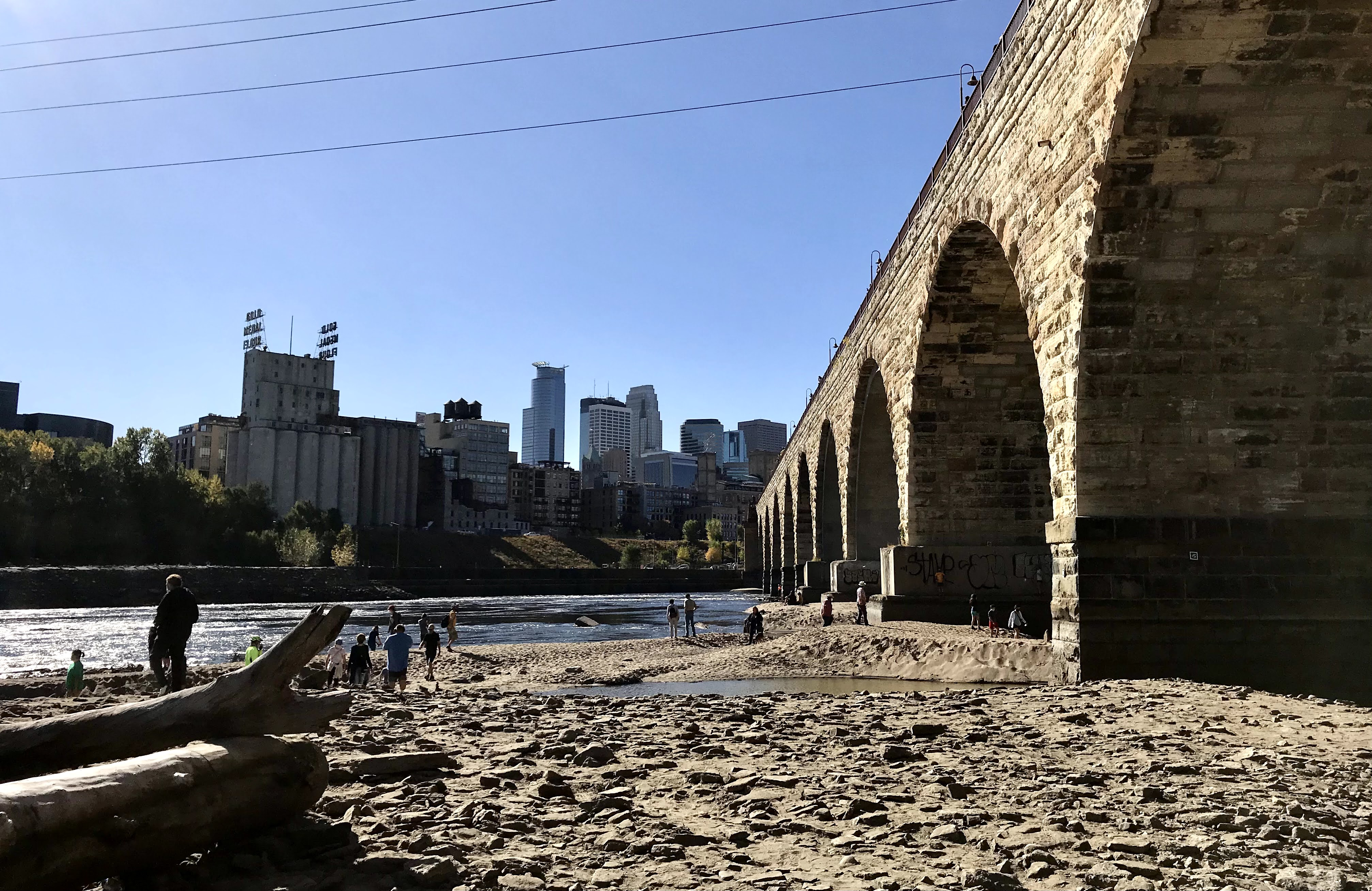
The bridge in 2020 when the Army Corps of Engineers manipulated an upstream dam to lower the river level.

1971 - The bridge became part of the National Register of Historic Places

1978 - The last passenger train crossed the Stone Arch Bridge

1978 - The Great Northern Depot was razed

1989 - The bridge was bought by the Hennepin County Regional Railroad Authority

1992 - The ownership was transferred to Minnesota Department of Transportation

1994 - The bridge was converted into a biking/walking path by the Minneapolis Park Board

== Design and construction ==
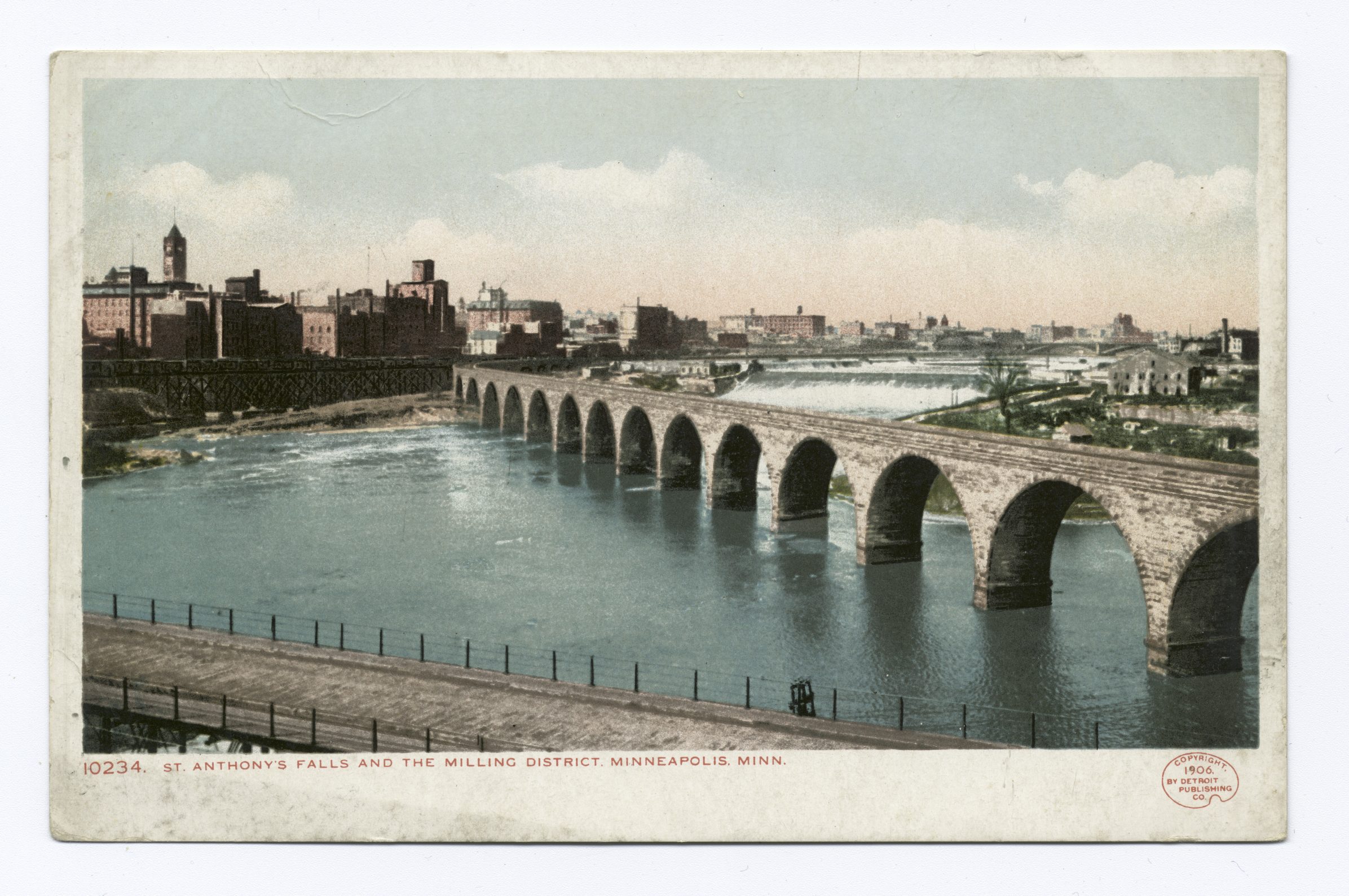
Early 20th century

The Stone Arch Bridge, commissioned by James J Hill and designed by Charles C Smith, was built between 1882 and 1883. Hill originally intended to build an iron bridge spanning the Mississippi at Nicollet Island, but Smith discovered that pursuing that design would be detrimental to St Anthony Falls' eroding sandstone. Smith's design was pioneering and the signature arches were designed to account for the falls and the surrounding topography. The stone used to make the bridge was locally sourced, including granite from Sauk Rapids for the piers and magnesium limestone from Mankato and Iowa for the upper portion.

In the 130 years of its existence the bridge has undergone a number of upgrades and repairs. In 1925 the width of the bridge was increased to allow for larger railcars. Then in 1994 the bridge was converted to a pedestrian walkway.

The Minnesota Department of Transportation planned to close the bridge from December 2024 until Fall 2025. The bridge underwent mortar repair, and replacement of several rocks and stones as needed. It reopened in July 2025.

== Heritage trail plaque ==
A plaque near the bridge explains that the bridge was built for the Manitoba Line (St. Paul, Minneapolis and Manitoba Railway), which would be used to bring wheat from the Red River valley and Canada to the Minneapolis mills. It remains as a monument to James J. Hill, his vision, and is a National Historic Civil Engineering Landmark.

== See also ==
- List of crossings of the Upper Mississippi River
- List of shared-use paths in Minneapolis

== Image gallery: the Stone Arch Bridge ==
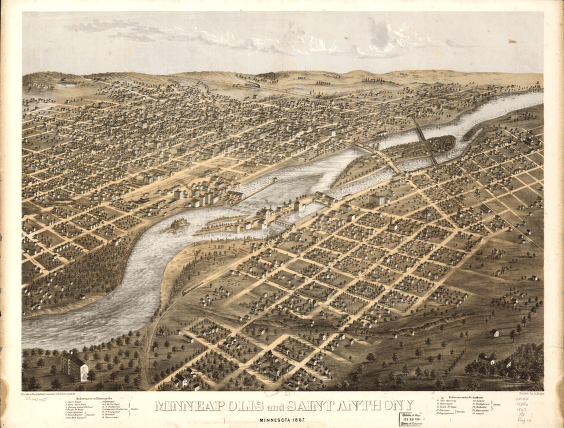
Minneapolis and St. Anthony Village before Stone Arch Bridge

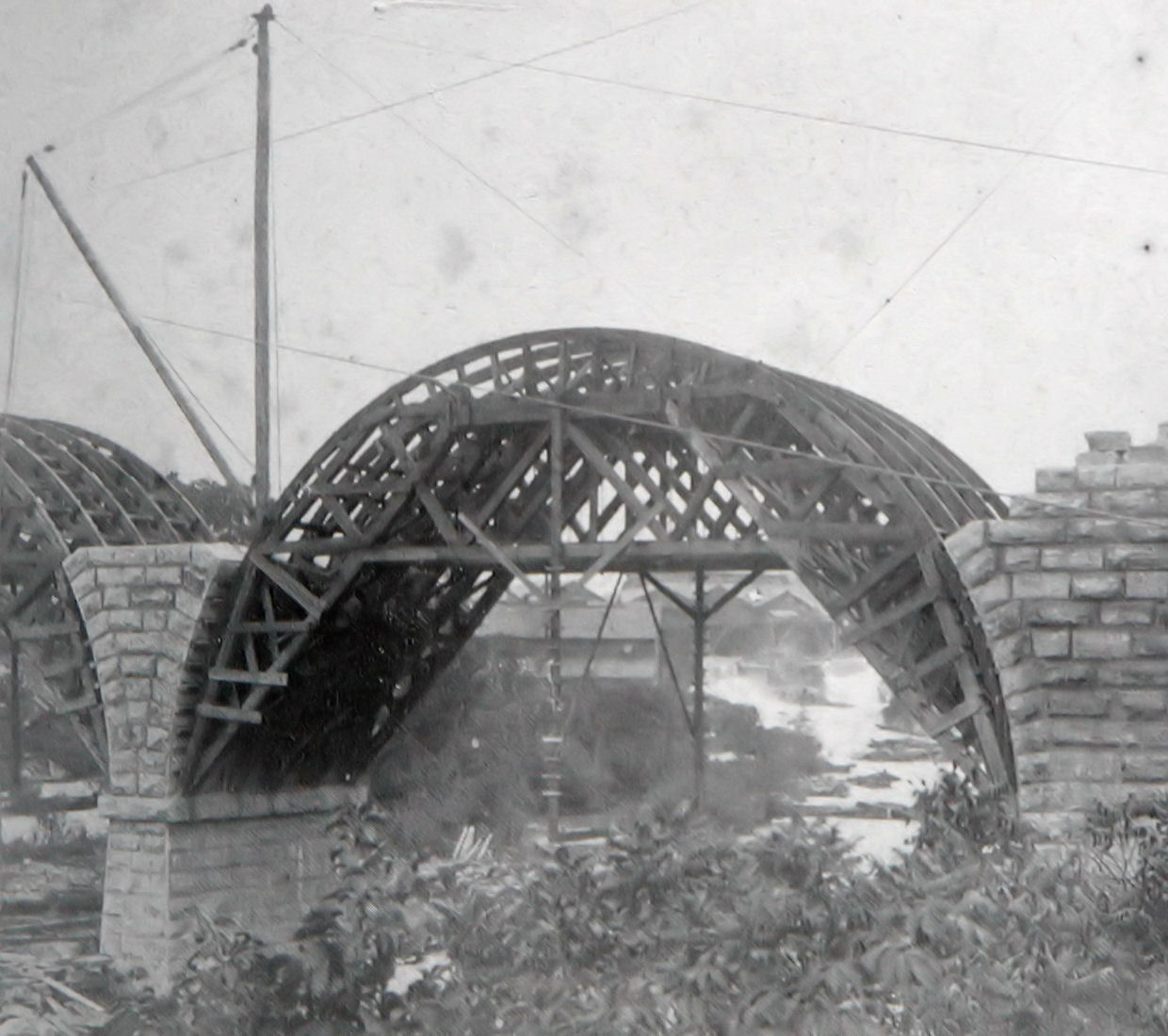
Under construction in 1883

Stone Arch Bridge During Construction

Stone arch bridge c1905

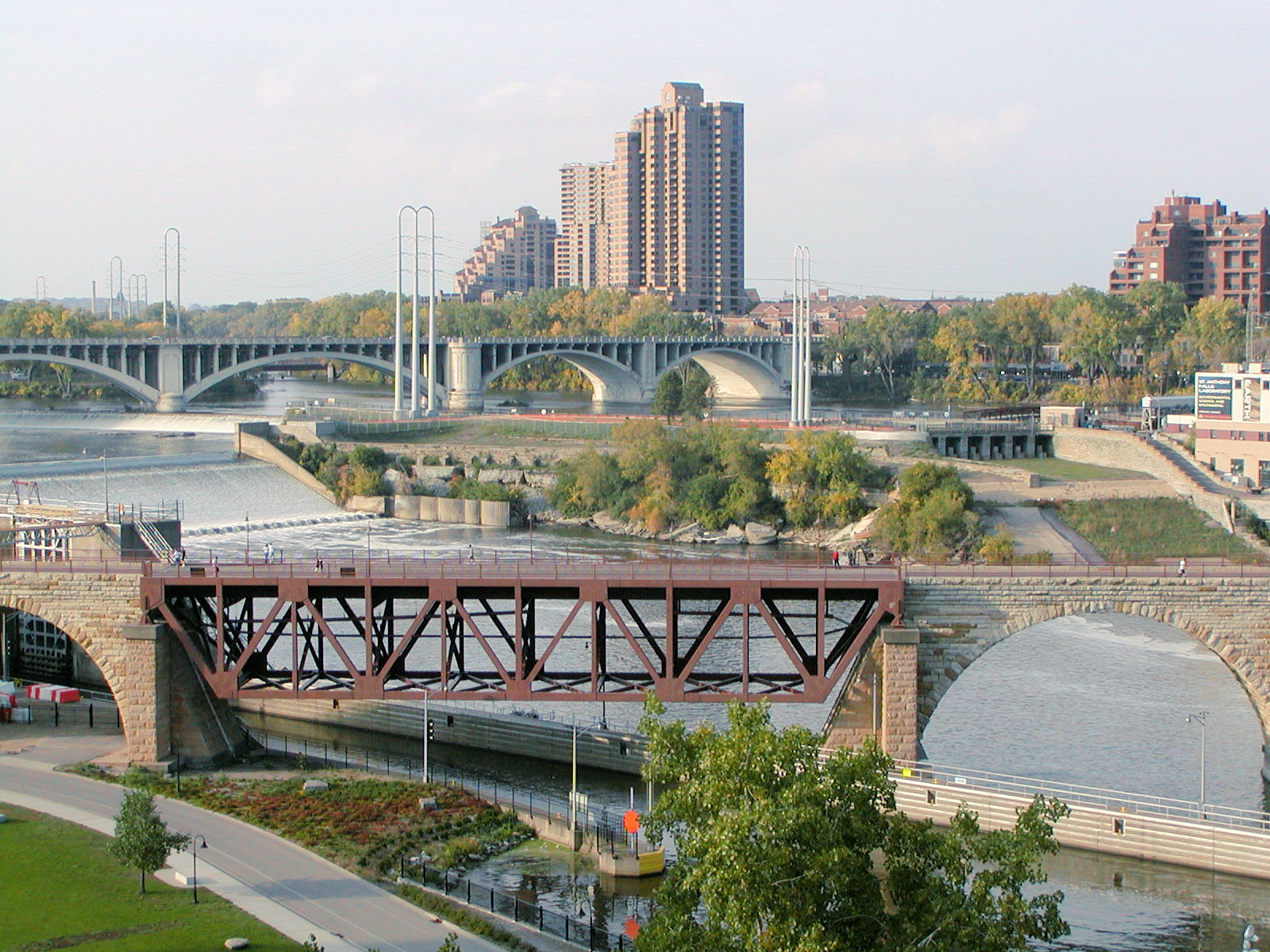
In 1963 two of the arches were replaced with a moveable truss so barges could pass through the new lock.

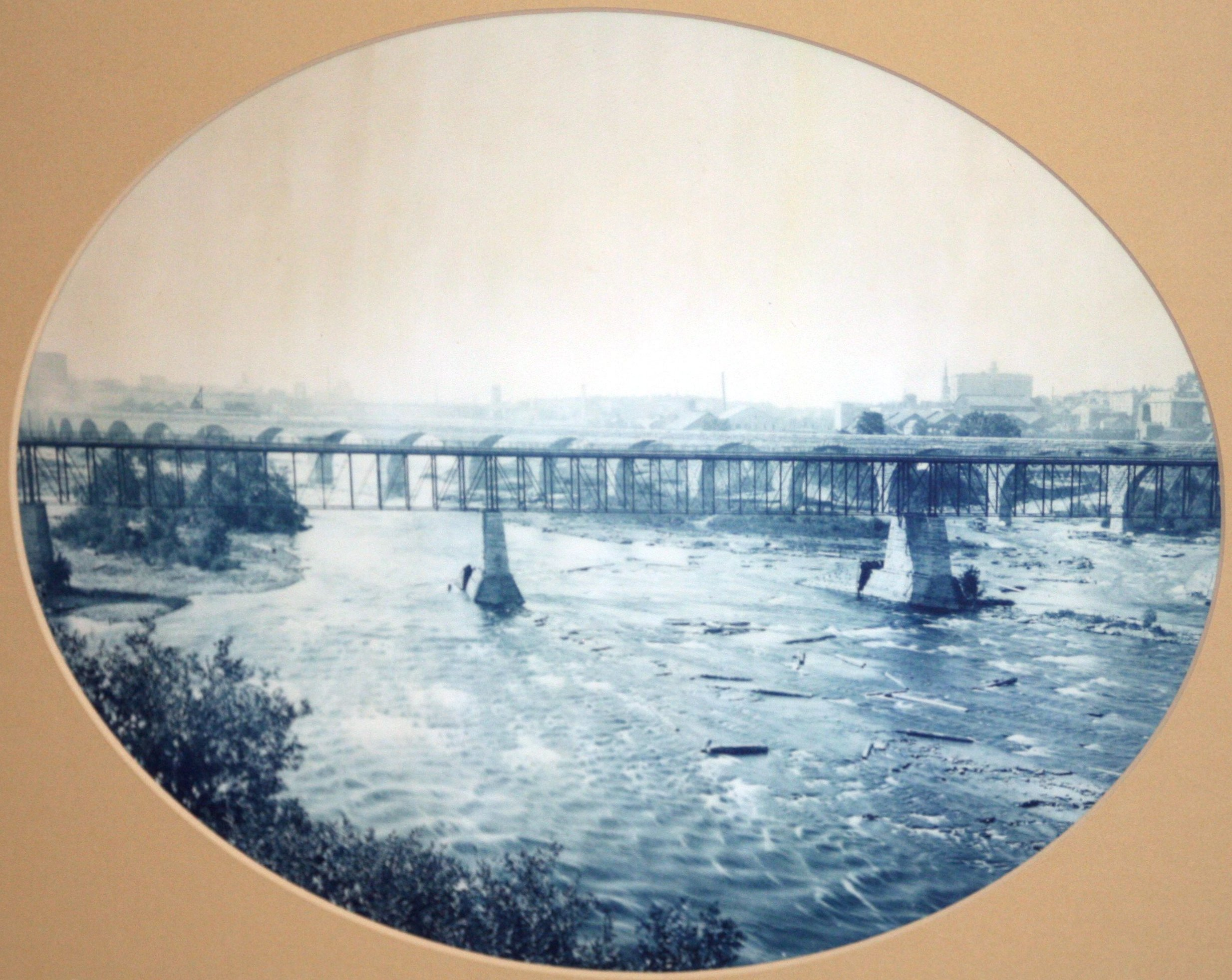
Below St. Anthony Falls (before 1892)

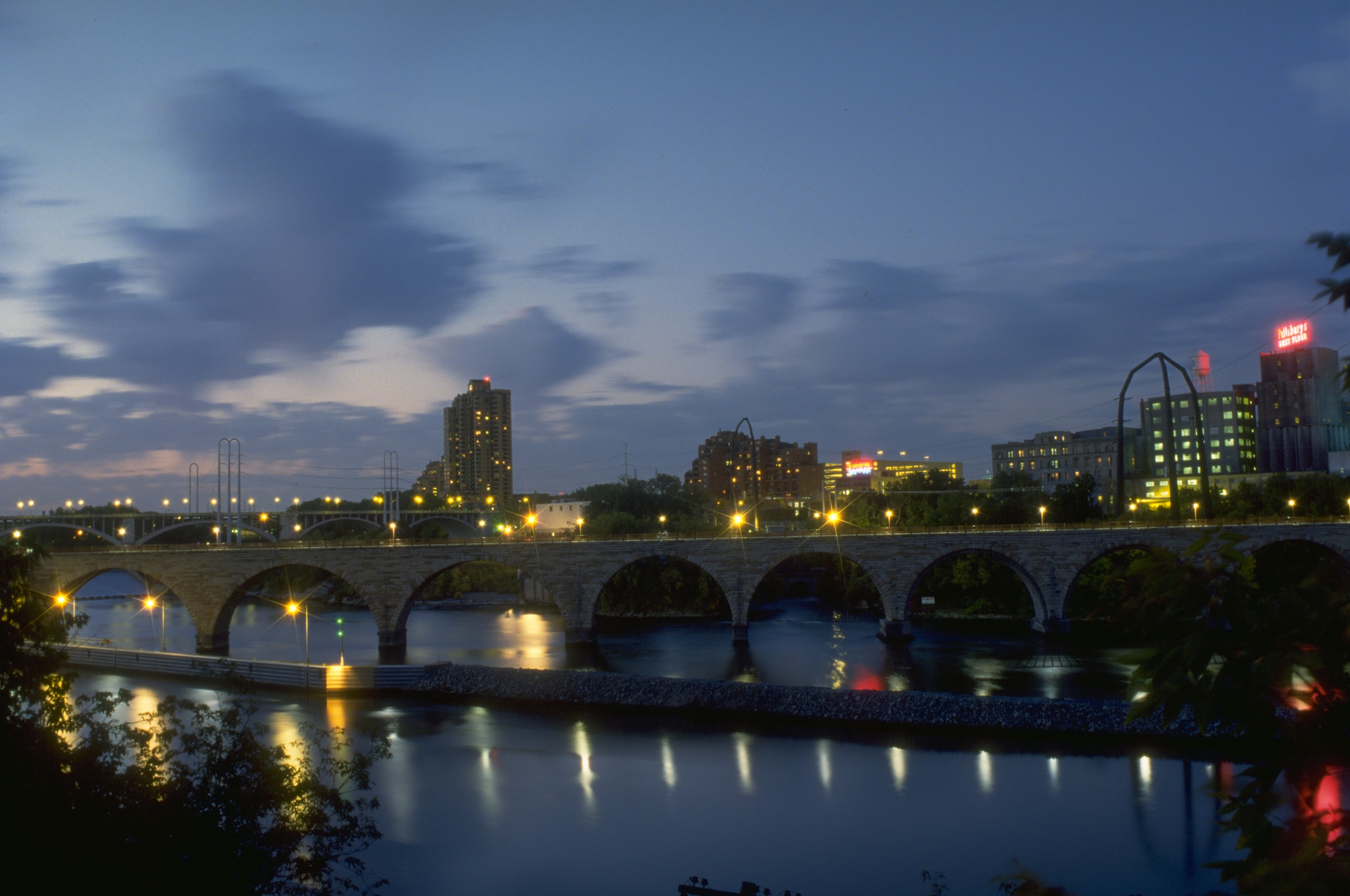
The Stone Arch Bridge at dusk

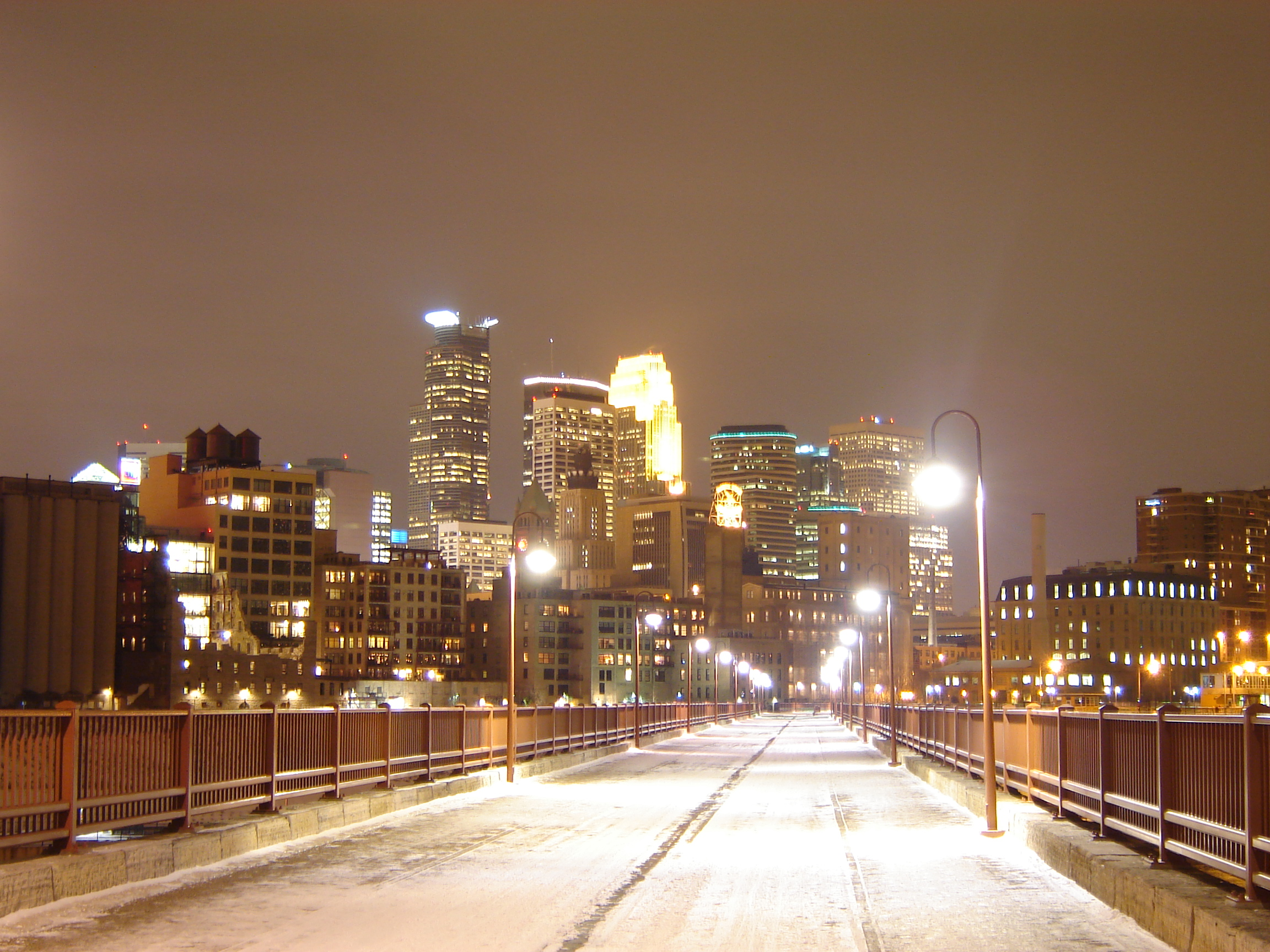
View of downtown Minneapolis from Stone Arch Bridge

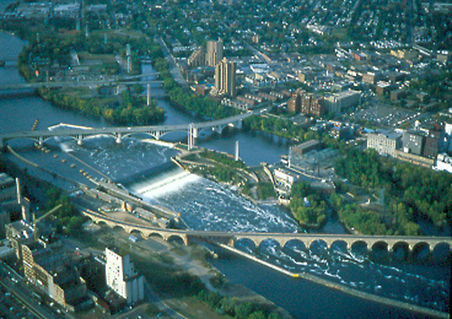
Aerial view of the Stone Arch Bridge below one of the dams that replaced the Saint Anthony Falls

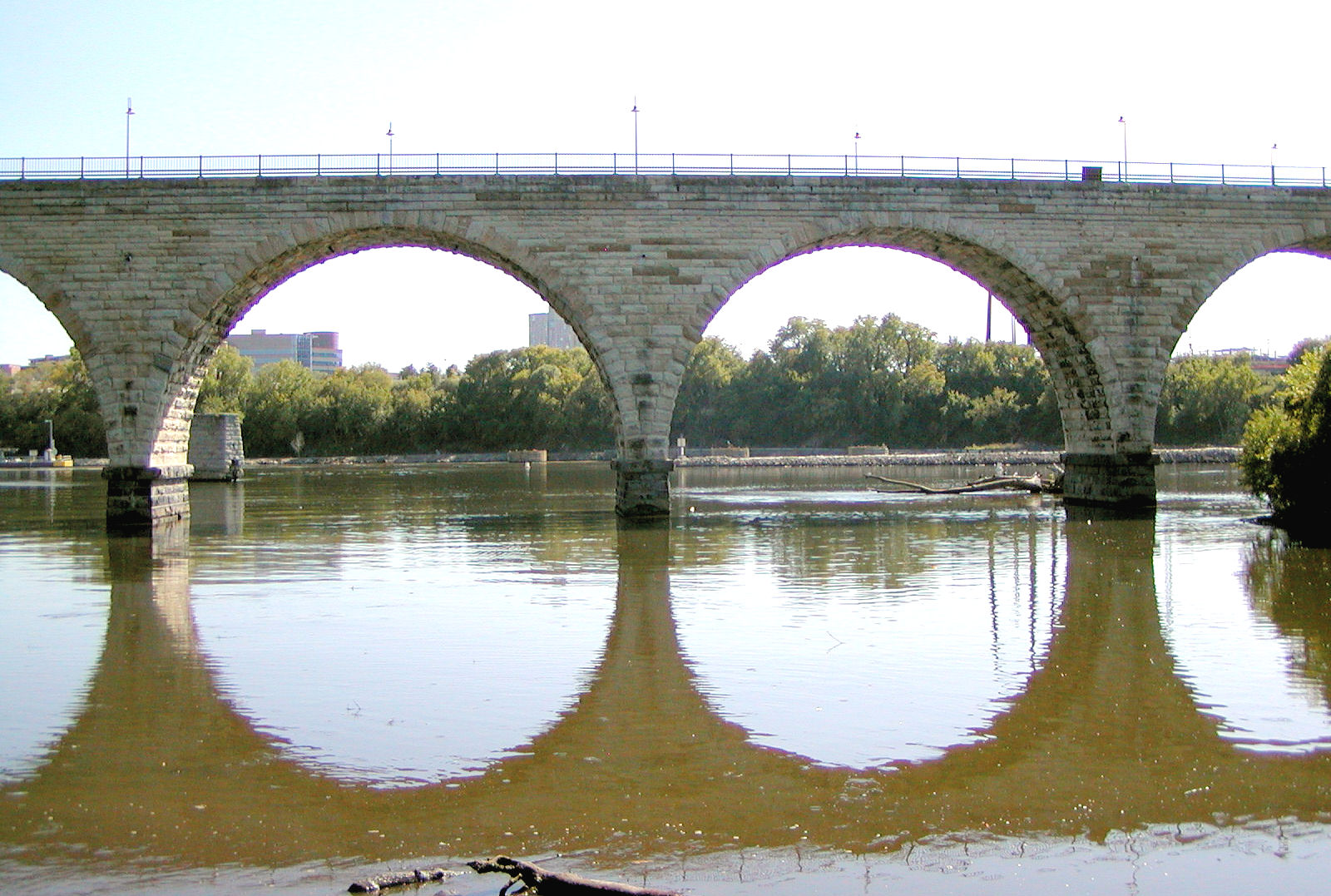
The Stone Arch Bridge from below

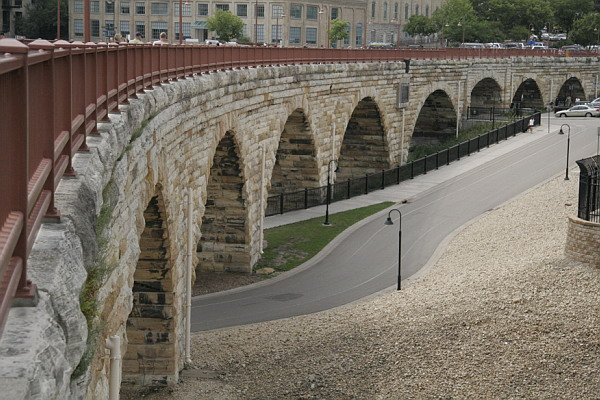
Perhaps the most striking feature of the bridge is its curvature

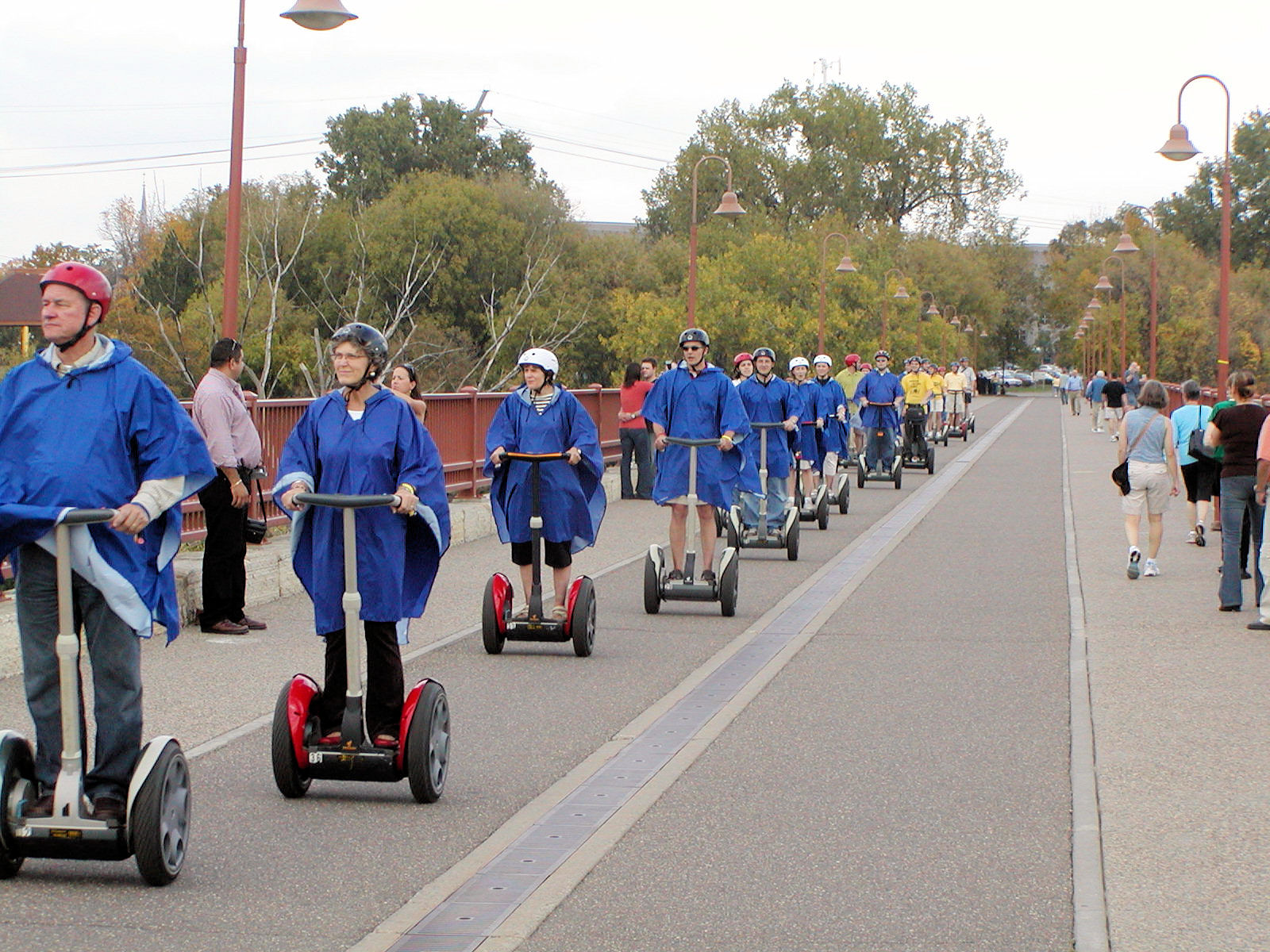
Segway tours across the bridge provide easy access

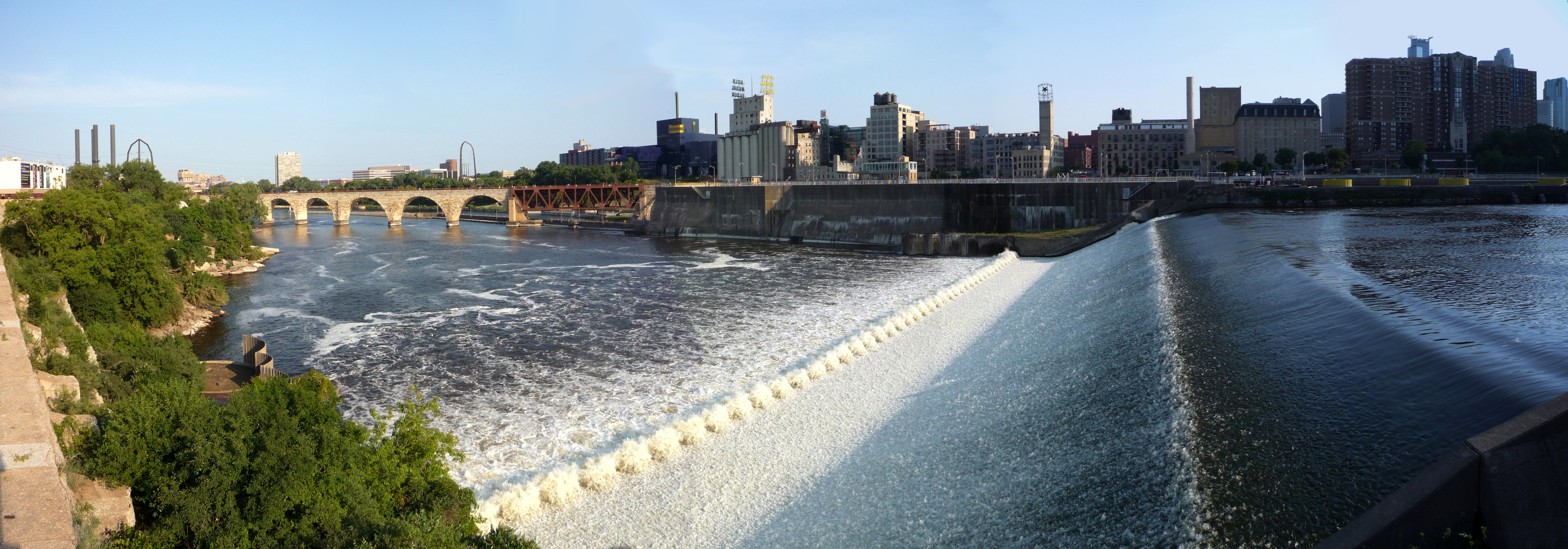
High-res panoramic photo from the new Water Power Park and the lower portion of Saint Anthony Falls

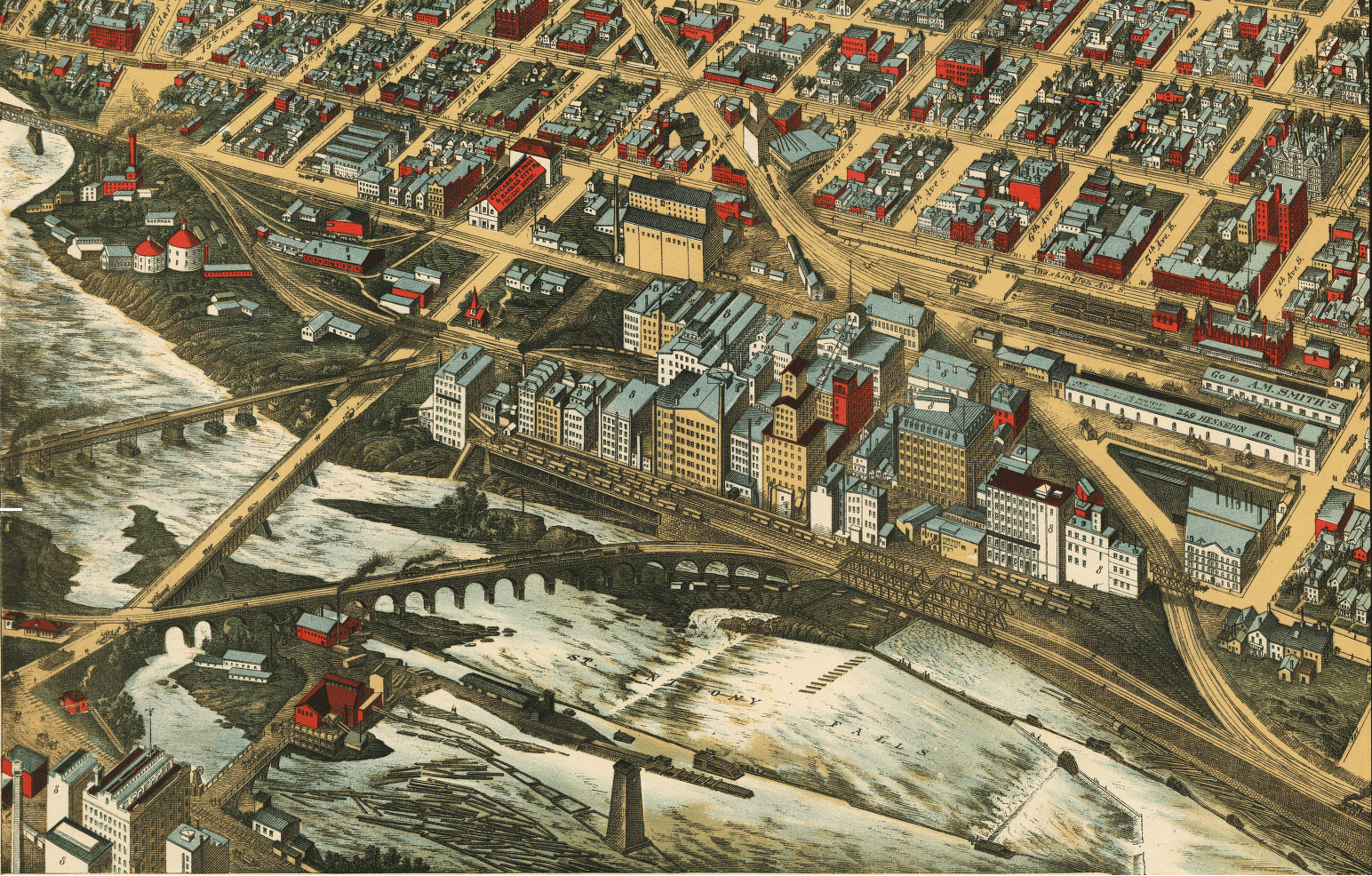
Mills District lithograph showing the bridge

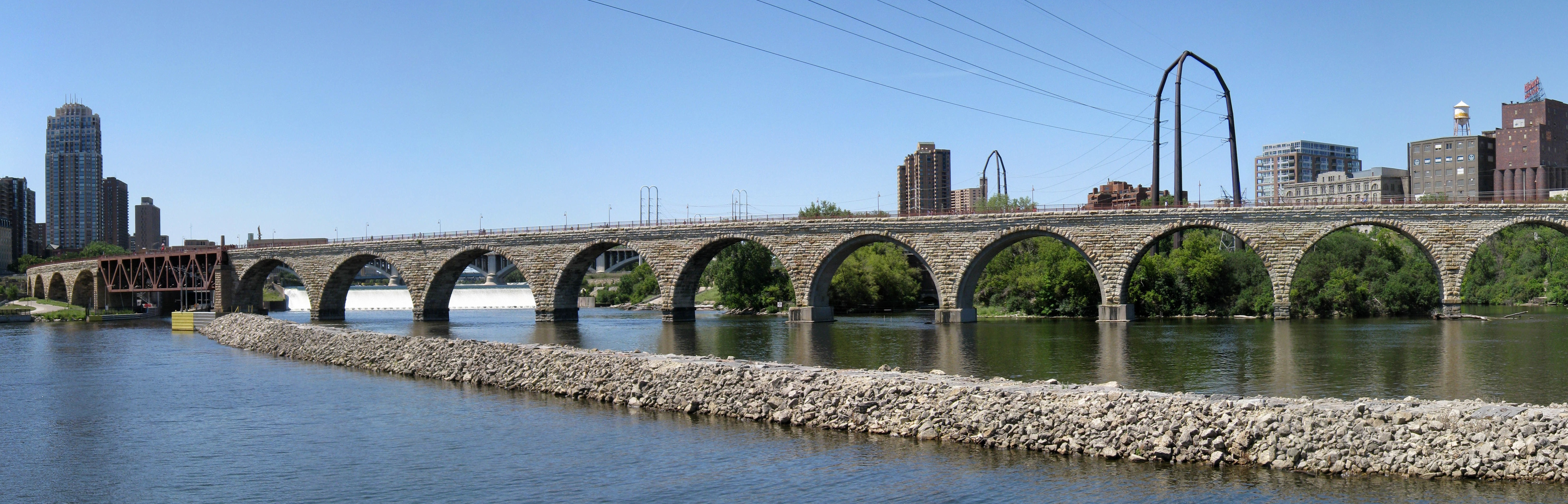
Panoramic photo from the ferry
