= Eastman tunnel =

Collapsed tunnel in Minneapolis, Minnesota

Coordinates: 44°59′03″N 93°15′27″W

- U.S. Historic district – Contributing property
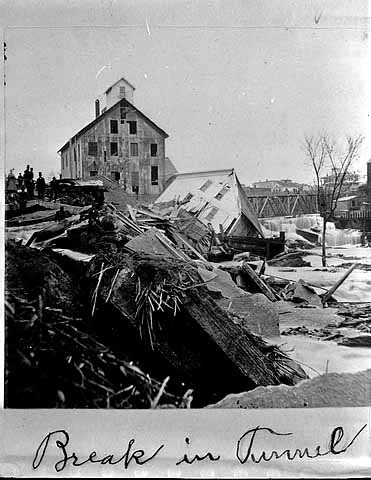
- 1869 Eastman tunnel collapse near Saint Anthony Falls
- Location: Minneapolis, Minnesota
- Built: 1868 started
- Built by: W. W. Eastman
- Part of: St. Anthony Falls Historic District (ID71000438)

The Eastman tunnel, also called the Hennepin Island tunnel, was a 2,000-foot-long (600 m) underground passage in Saint Anthony, Minnesota (now Minneapolis), dug beneath the Mississippi River riverbed between 1868 and 1869 to create a tailrace so water-powered business could be located upstream of Saint Anthony Falls on Nicollet Island. The tunnel ran downstream from Nicollet Island, beneath Hennepin Island, and exited below Saint Anthony Falls.

During construction of the tunnel on October 5, 1869, the river broke through the thin layer of limestone separating the river's bed from the tunnel. The rushing river scoured the tunnel, caving in parts of Hennepin Island and causing the earth supporting Saint Anthony Falls to collapse upstream. There was serious concern that the riverbed would crumble and reduce Saint Anthony Falls to a long set of rapids. Within a few weeks, dams were built to divert the river and stop Saint Anthony Falls from being washed away. The fix was temporary as the 1870 spring floods damaged some of the new dams and swept away more of Hennepin Island. The final fix for the tunnel disaster was a concrete dike constructed by the United States Army Corps of Engineers. The Corps also built a protective sloping wood timber apron to create an artificial waterfall, which remains the only major waterfall on the Mississippi River.

The Eastman tunnel is a contributing resource to the St. Anthony Falls Historic District. The District is on the National Register of Historic Places.

The site of the tunnel is about a mile upstream from the present-day I-35W Mississippi River bridge.

== Background ==
Hennepin Island was named after explorer, Catholic priest, and Franciscan missionary Father Louis Hennepin. In 1865, entrepreneurs William W. Eastman and John L. Merriam had bought its sister island, Nicollet Island, which is 700 feet (210 m) or more above the falls. Eastman and Merriam (and two partners) planned to build a tailrace tunnel from Nicollet Island under Saint Anthony Falls to provide for-profit waterpower for milling and lumber businesses located on Nicollet Island. The tunnel was to be part of a system of waterworks that supported the industries driving Minneapolis' growth. The project was designed to create more industry on Nicollet Island through waterpower.

Saint Anthony Falls are made up of a hard limestone cap over soft sandstone. Ten thousand years ago the falls were located near present-day Fort Snelling, at the confluence of the Mississippi River and glacial River Warren (now the Minnesota River). In the succeeding millennia, the river had been washing away the sandstone and undermining the limestone lip of Saint Anthony Falls, causing the falls to slowly retreat upriver to their present location. The limestone cap is increasingly thinning through the falls area and above, and ends about 1,200 feet (370 m) above the falls. In a short time, geologically speaking, the falls would migrate to the end of the cap and become a rapids.

== History ==
In 1868, workers began to dig a 2,500-foot-long (760 m) tunnel from below the falls, under Hennepin Island, under the riverbed to Nicollet Island. For the next year, workers dug in the soft sandstone beneath the thin layer of limestone that forms the river's bed. By October 1869, with about 2,000 feet (610 m) of tunnel dug and the tunnel near Nicollet Island, water had begun seeping into the tunnel from above.

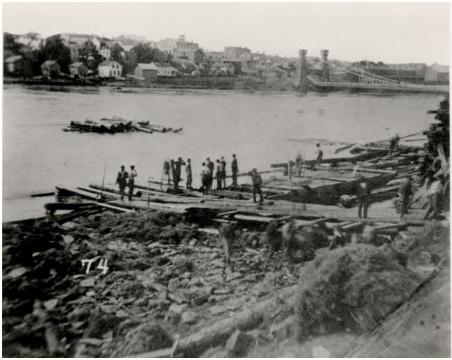
Photo taken shortly after the Eastman tunnel collapse. The scene is of a group of men sorting logs on Nicollet Island looking toward Saint Anthony Falls. A barge is visible in foreground and Minneapolis buildings are in the background.

On October 5, 1869, the river broke through the thin layer of limestone separating the river's bed from the tunnel. The rushing river scoured the tunnel, caving in parts of Hennepin Island and causing the earth supporting Saint Anthony Falls to collapse upstream. There was immediate, serious concern that the riverbed would crumble and reduce Saint Anthony Falls to a long set of rapids. One witness remembered, "Proprietors of stores hastened to the falls, taking their clerks with them; bakers deserted their ovens, lumbermen were ordered from the mills, barbers left their customers unshorn; mechanics dropped their tools; lawyers shut up their books or stopped pleading in the courts; physicians abandoned their offices. Through the streets, hurrying hundreds were seen on their way to the falls."

Work started immediately to plug the tunnel and hundreds of volunteers used timbers and stones. The river easily washed these out of the tunnel. Within a few weeks, the plug held and dams were built to divert the river and stop Saint Anthony Falls from being washed away. The fix was temporary and the 1870 spring floods tore up some of the new dams and swept away more of Hennepin Island. In addition, the earth support below the Summit flour mill, Moulton's planing mill, and a wheat storehouse were undermined and each of these was tipped into the river.

Attempts to plug the collapses had been defeated by subsequent breaks in the cap. Building dams to keep the river away from the breaks had not worked either. The river washed away dams, and tunneling bypassed them. Tunneling was discovered that originated above where the limestone cap ended about 600 feet (180 m) above the original break. If not fixed, this tunneling from above the limestone cap would reduce the falls to a set of rapids.

The final fix was a concrete dike constructed by the Corps of Engineers. The dike, completed by 1876, was just above the falls and Hennepin Island, from right under the limestone cap down as much as 40 feet (12 m), and 1,850 feet (560 m) long across the entire river channel. The dike cut off the tunnel and any possible future bypass channels. By 1880, the Corps of Engineers had covered the face of the falls with a sloping wood timber apron, creating the artificial falls. The apron stopped the upstream progression of the falls (which was a separate problem from the tunnel) and prevented damage from logs that escaped from the then prevalent sawmills. In 1952 the wood apron was destroyed by a flood and replaced by the current very visible concrete apron. The corps also constructed two low dams on top of the limestone cap above the falls. The dams kept the limestone wet, which helps prevent its deterioration. The corps filled the tunnels and cavities under the limestone with gravel. Regarding the remains of the tunnels: "Portions of the tunnel survive, but their condition is undetermined."

== Aftermath ==
The tremendous damage caused by the Hennepin Island tunnel brought lawsuits and demands for political change. A central issue at that time was whether local taxpayers should pay for repairs that would enrich riverfront industrialists. To the relief of the local population, the United States Army Corps of Engineers made the repairs using federal money on the pretext that it was protecting navigation. The federal government spent $615,000 (equivalent to $15,658,000 in 2025) on this effort, while the cities of Saint Anthony and Minneapolis spent $334,500 (equivalent to $8,517,000 in 2025).

== See also ==
- Hennepin Avenue Bridge
- Hennepin Avenue
- Hennepin Island Hydroelectric Plant
- History of Minneapolis
- St. Anthony Falls Historic District
- Mill City Museum
- Mill Ruins Park
- Mill District, Minneapolis
- North Star Woolen Mill
- Northwestern Consolidated Milling Company
- Pillsbury A-Mill
- St. Anthony Falls Hydroelectric Development
