= Hennepin Avenue Bridge (1855) =

Former bridge in Minneapolis, Minnesota

Suspension Bridge
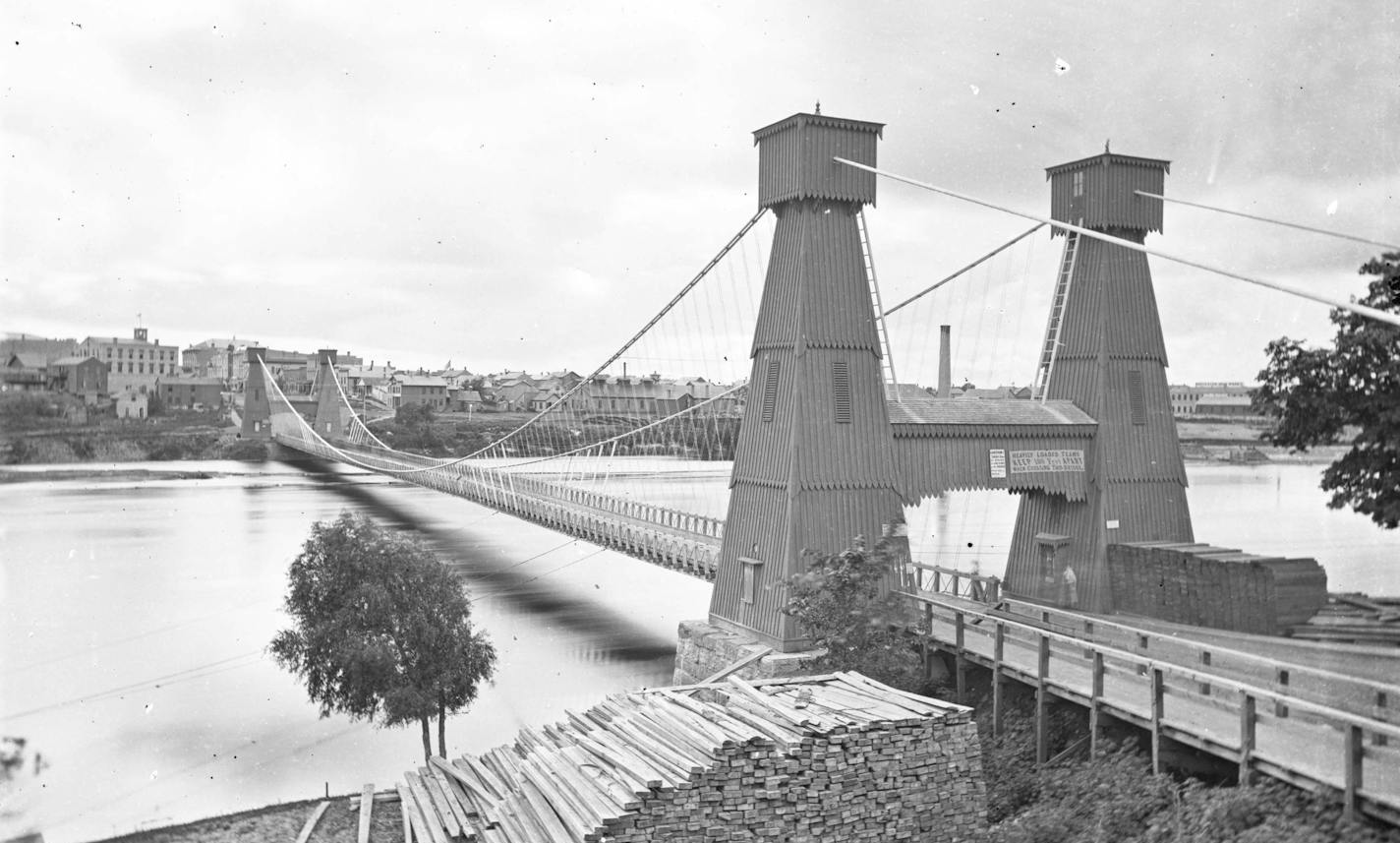
- The bridge in 1868
- Coordinates: 44°59′07″N 93°15′50″W
- Crosses: Mississippi River
- Locale: Minneapolis, Minnesota, US

Characteristics
- Design: Suspension bridge
- Total length: 620 feet (190 m)

History
- Construction start: May 5, 1854; 171 years ago
- Construction end: December 5, 1854; 170 years ago
- Opened: January 23, 1855; 170 years ago
- Replaced by: Hennepin Avenue Bridge

Statistics
- Toll: 25¢ (horses); 5¢ (pedestrians

The Hennepin Avenue Bridge (Note: It is unclear if the bridge was called anything other than "the Suspension Bridge" during its existence; all news sources from the time refer to it as such. This article is calling it Hennepin Avenue Bridge as a matter of description rather than formal name, and for continuity with its current successor, the Hennepin Avenue Bridge.) was a bridge in Minneapolis, Minnesota, United States, spanning the Mississippi River at Hennepin Avenue from the Minneapolis Bank to Nicollet Island. Built in 1854 and opened in 1855, it was the first bridge to span the Mississippi.

== Background ==
Prior to the building of the bridge, a rock ledge above Saint Anthony Falls could be used to cross the Mississippi River and during low water periods fording the river was possible. Dakota would also occasionally take travelers across in canoes. A rope ferry crossing from Nicollet Island to the western bank of the river was built in 1847 by Franklin Steele and John Stevens. The ferry could not keep up with increasing traffic, however, and in 1851 a short bridge from St. Anthony to Nicollet Island was built to facilitate easier travel. Shortly thereafter, on March 4, 1852, Steele and his partners were granted a charter to build a bridge from Nicollet Island to Minneapolis to complete the crossing.

== Construction ==
As a result of the charter, the Mississippi Bridge Company was formed and selected engineer Thomas W. Griffith to lead the construction of a bridge in place of the rope ferry system. Work began on a suspension bridge on May 5, 1854. The bridge cost $36,000 ($1.21 million in 2024) to build. The span of the bridge was 620 feet, and the cables dropped 47 feet from their towers. The design was "of a modern character" and compared to the Niagara Falls Suspension Bridge.

=== Opening ===
The bridge was finished on December 5, 1854, and opened for traffic on January 23, 1855. A large celebration, including a parade that starting at the St. Charles Hotel in Saint Anthony, marked the occasion. After processing to Nicollet Island and crossing the smaller bridge, the parade, complete with marching band, was greeted by a cannon as they stepped on the new crossing. Afterwards a dinner took place back at the St. Charles Hotel, with toasts to the President of the United States, the Judiciary, Congress, the military, the governor, the press, and the women of the territory.

It was the first bridge to be built across the Mississippi River. The first railroad bridge would be completed the following year in Davenport, Iowa.

== Use ==
The bridge began its life as a toll bridge, costing 25¢ ($8.44 in 2024) per team of horses and 5¢ ($1.69 in 2024) per pedestrian. Even from the beginning of its service, the bridge was inadequate to serve the needs of the area; Saint Anthony and Minneapolis both experienced rapid growth, with populations of about 1,000 and 450, respectively, in 1854 increasing to 2,500 and 3,200 by 1860.

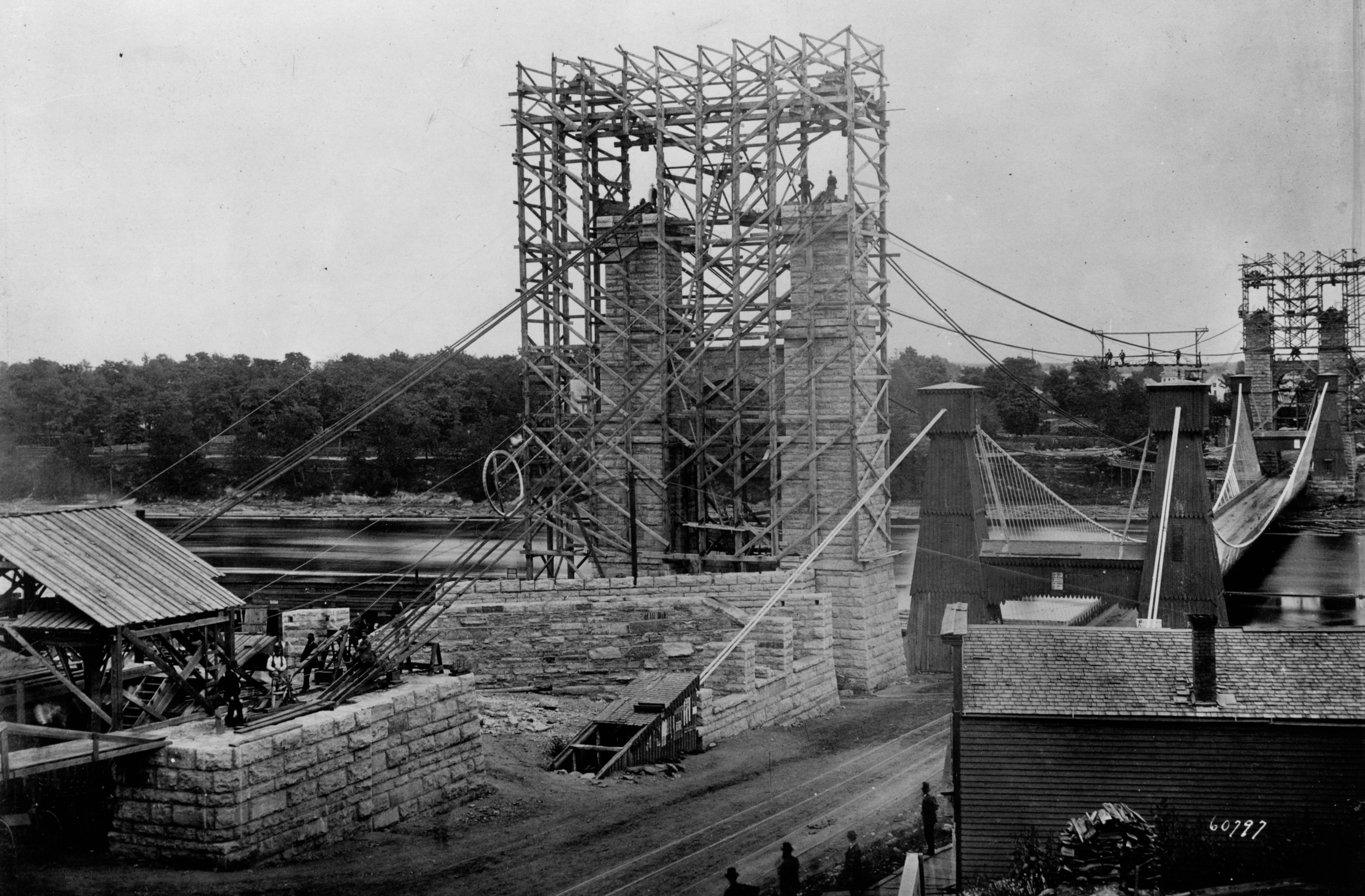
Construction of the second bridge, with the first bridge on the right

In 1866, the Mississippi Bridge Company's charter expired and Hennepin County assumed control of the bridge, purchasing it for $37,500 ($805,313 in 2024). By 1872, the bonds used to build the bridge had been paid off and the bridge became a free crossing.

== Later years ==
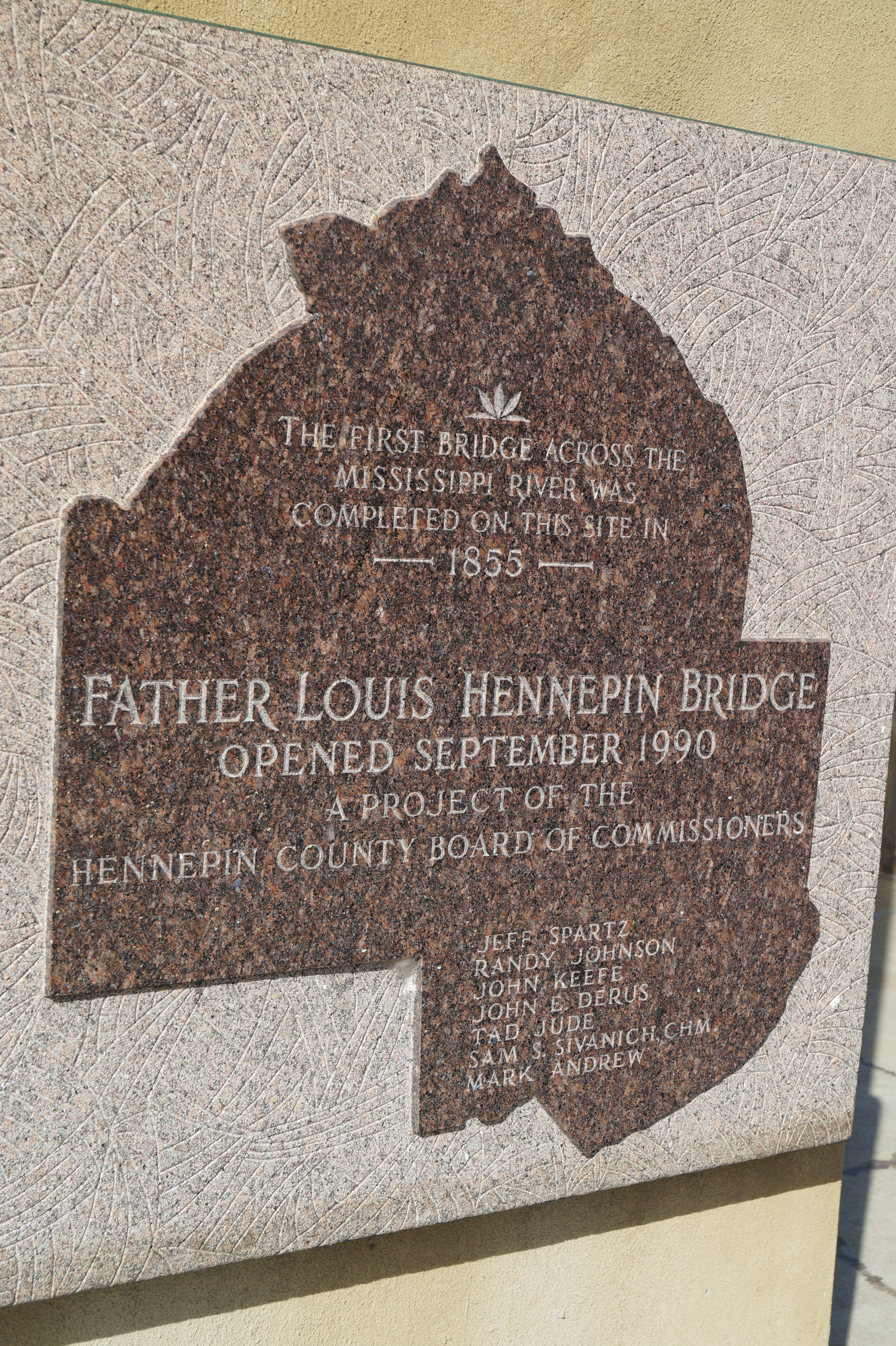
A commemorative plaque at the site of the bridge

When the city of Saint Anthony merged with the city of Minneapolis, the bridge, up until that point owned by the county, was handed over to the city. With the bridge now connecting a city to itself rather than two cities to each other its traffic began to multiply and people began clamoring for a new bridge. On February 22, 1877, a new bridge, directly north of the 1855 crossing, was opened. The bridge was demolished soon after the second bridge opened.
