= St. Anthony Falls Hydroelectric Development =

Used for waterpower in Minneapolis, Minnesota

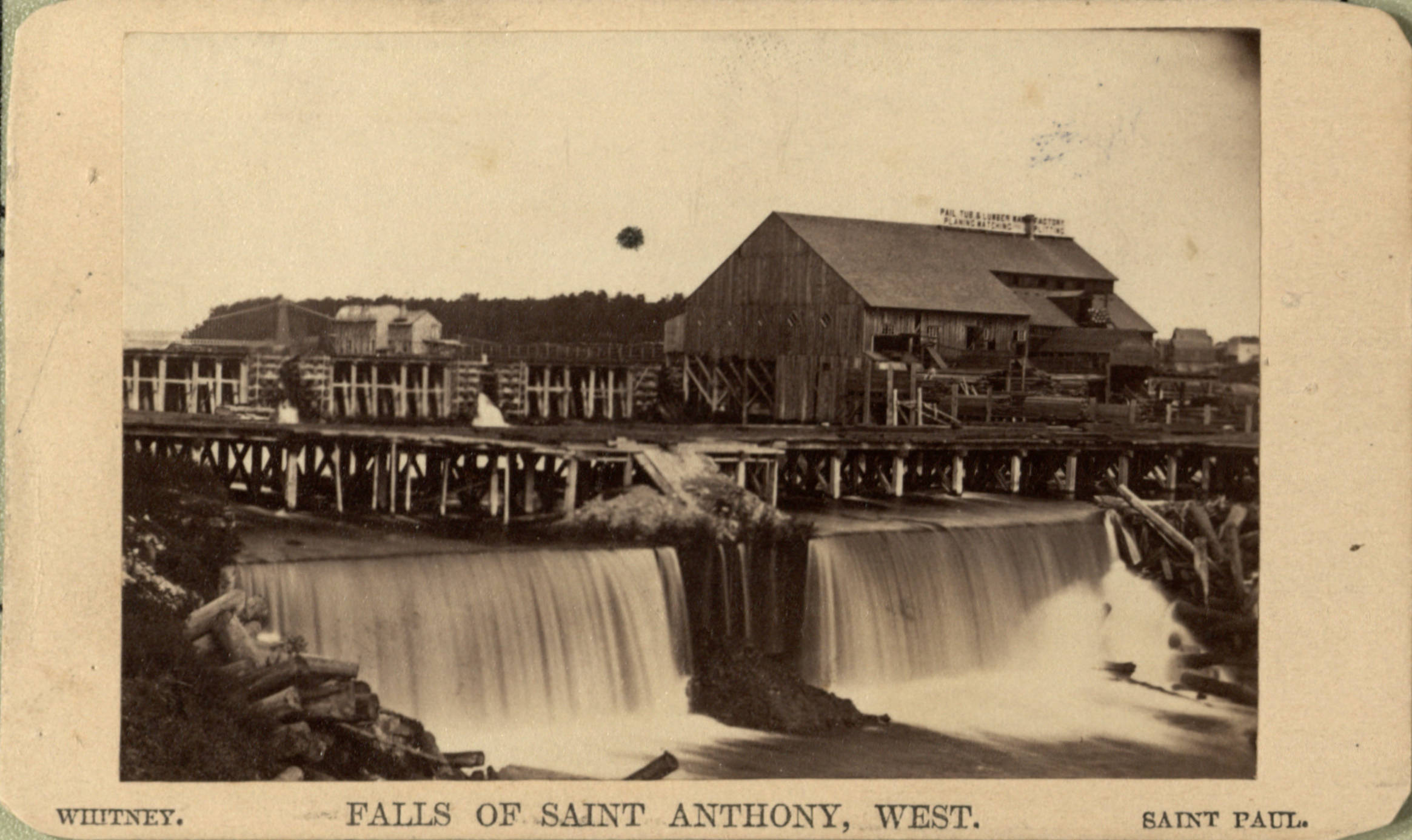
Sawmills on St. Anthony Falls ca. 1860's. Suspension bridge on Hennepin Avenue in the background.

Saint Anthony Falls in Minneapolis, Minnesota, was the only natural falls on the Mississippi River until 1880. Since almost the beginning of settlement in the area by Europeans, the falls have been used for hydropower.

== Early Hydropower ==
Soldiers from nearby Fort Snelling began construction of the first mills in 1820. A sawmill was in operation in by 1821 and a flour mill in 1823. As soon as the land east of the falls became commercially available in 1848, entrepreneurs like Franklin Steele purchased land with the intent of using the water power of the falls for lumber. Fort Snelling initially refused to sell the land west of the falls, considering it part of fort territory. However the War Department would relent when an Illinois representative Robert Smith requested some land on the west bank for local production of flour.

It would take until 1854 for the floodgates to open for mills development, when the Treaty of Mendota was signed after the defeat of the Dakota. This allowed Congress to finally cede territory from the fort and give it up to settlers. In 1856, interests from both sides of the falls formed consolidated companies to manage the water rights. On the east bank Steele and his partners would form St. Anthony Falls Power company, and on the west the Minneapolis Mill Company by Dorilus Morrison and associates like cousin William D. Washburn. They petitioned the state legislature for perpetual water rights, which they then leased to specific companies. From 1880 to 1930 the area became the number one flour producer in the US. In later years, some of the power came from steam, but in 1923 half of the waterpower used was for flour milling.

=== Eastman Tunnel Collapse ===
The waterpower companies would split the head of the river with a v-shaped Horseshoe dam above the falls to divide the water between the east and west side developments, weakening the fragile sandstone base of the falls. Thus when businessmen William W. Eastman and John L. Merriam conspired to build a mill on Nicollet Island, the 2,000 ft. tailrace they constructed to the downriver section of the falls collapsed and nearly destroyed the falls. It was only when Congress authorized $50,000 to the Army Engineering Corps with the ostensible reason of preserving save navigation beyond the falls, that the entire milling industry was not lost. Over the course of two years they would build the cutoff wall which prevented further erosion of the limestone cap of the falls from underneath.

== History ==
=== Upton Island Plant ===
The explosion of the Pillsbury A-Mill in 1878 led to William de la Barre, a representative of the Brehmer Brothers Company, to offer his services in 1880 reconstruction of the Washburn mill. The mill dominated Main St. when rebuilt in 1881 and was the largest flour mill in the world for forty years. It had a headrace tunnel, two drop pits for two turbines, and two tailrace tunnels. All but the top half of the headrace is constructed in bedrock. Soon, he was named as a director of the Minneapolis Mill Company and hired as an employee in 1883. De la Barre saw the potential for hydroelectric power on the falls, and made many improvements in the 1880s on the west bank, building additional power canals to power nearby mills, and preserving the fragile falls by reinforcing and building additional sluices.

In 1881 the Pillsbury "A" Mill added a small electric plant to power arc-lights for the mill. But it was not until 1882, two years after the Wolverine Chair factory in Grand Rapids, that the Minnesota Brush Electric Co., built a centralized generator plant on the west bank. It produced power using five water powered Brush generators, and became the third hydroelectric station that supplied multiple users in the US. Soon Minneapolis street lights were added, including a 257 ft. high tower at Bridge Square to demonstrate the effectiveness of electric lights. The Brush Electric station however was demolished in 1884 and relocated upriver to the Fourth Avenue North for more reliable water flow. This was the first steam powered electric plant in Minneapolis. In 1886 generators were added for incandescent lights. In 1893 the company would become part of Minnesota General Electric (MGE). In 1895 the generators were moved to the Main Street Station. The remains of Upton Island were removed when the locks were installed in the 1960s. The Mill ended waterpower use in 1955 and ended flour production in 2003.

=== Main Street Station ===
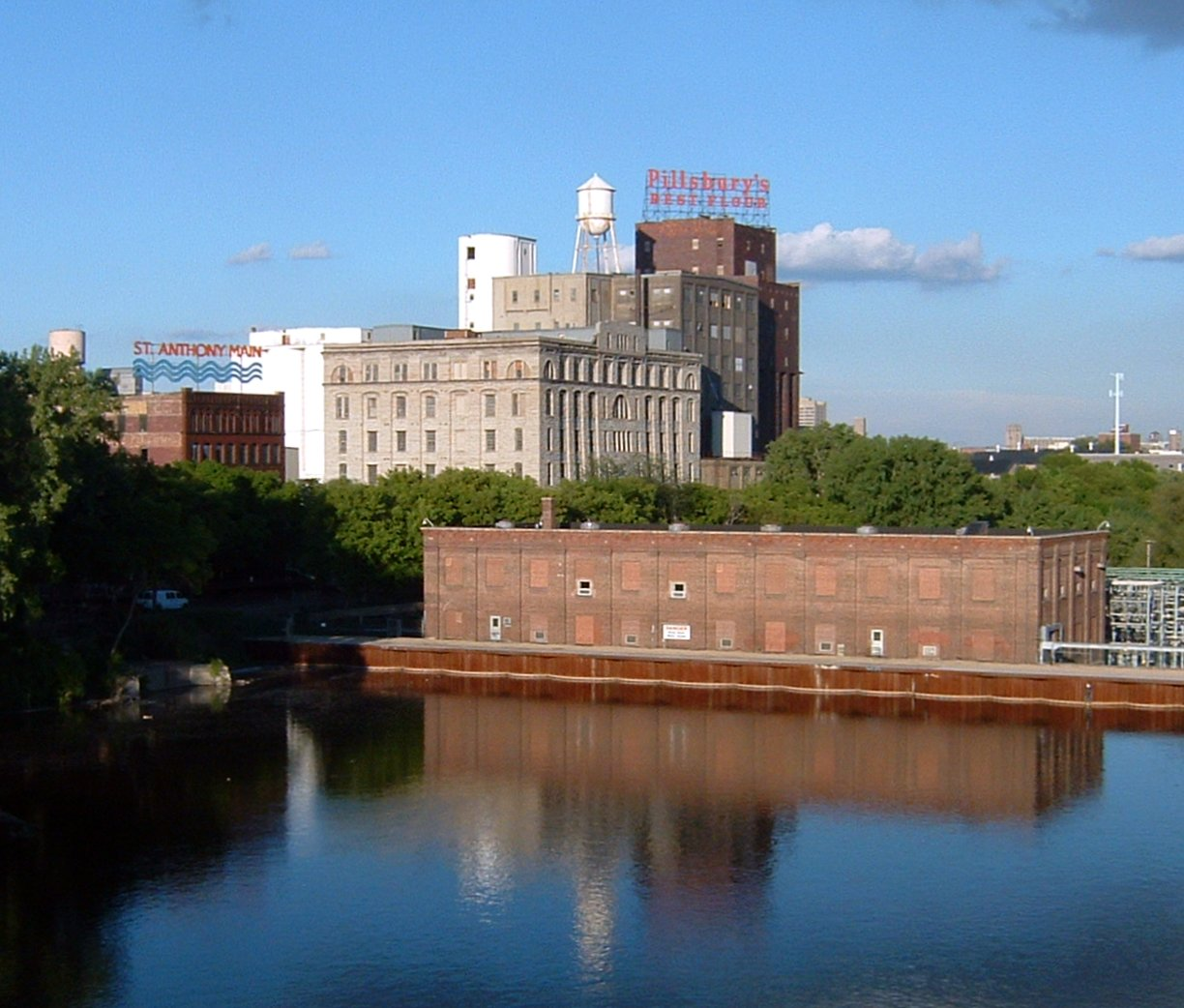
1911 Main Street Station with Pillsbury "A" Mill behind

In 1894 the Mill company offered a water lease in terms of 20 millpowers to the Minneapolis subsidiary of General Electric. GE combined that with other water rights, including from sawmills that had burned down, and built the Main Street Station at the falls, constructed 1894–1895. About 38% of the generation was from waterpower (the rest was steam).

The original station burned down and a new one was built in 1911 that used only waterpower for three 480 kW generators. The plant was the main generating facility for the city, so Minneapolis General Electric wanted the plant back in operation rapidly. That resulted in a plant that was significantly more primitive than the 1908 Hennepin Island Hydroelectric Plant built three years earlier. The turbines survived the fire and were reused. That required the new generators be powered by a "rope drive" (rope used as a drive belt), and the electrical production was far smaller than the Hennepin Island Plant. The Station continued to produce electricity until 1968 Shown in the picture, the plant is very visible at 206 Main St. One side, with intake gates, is against the upper pond. A dam was built in 2000 to protect that side (it is now the access to a Water Power Park). The visible part of the plant is above the limestone cap that forms the Falls. The east-side channel of the river (around Hennepin Island) used to flow through where the Plant is and over the east-channel Falls about 300 ft. downstream from the Plant. The Plant was built between Hennepin Island and the east bank.

=== Lower Locks and Dam ===
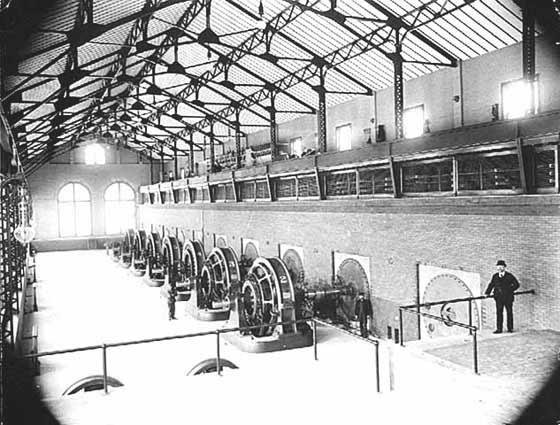
1895 Lower Dam - 7 of 8 - 35 Hz plus 2 - DC generators (Minnesota Historical Society)

Right after the Main Street Station, de la Barre built a "lower dam" and the lower dam hydroelectric powerhouse about a half mile below the falls. Construction was 1895–1897. This was the first dam built exclusively for hydroelectric generation in Minnesota. and had a much larger electrical capacity plant than any other plant in the state. The plant also used an innovative horizontal shaft direct mechanical connection between turbines and generators instead of a belt drive common previously. Power was sold to the streetcar company (TCRT), which was replacing old streetcars with electric streetcars starting 1889. Generation was 35 Hz (8 generators) and DC (2 generators), 8.5 megawatt using a 19 ft. head. In the same area, the Southeast Steam Plant was constructed 1903 at the east bank end of the Stone Arch Bridge, also to power streetcars.

About 1950 electric streetcars were replaced by buses and The TCRT no longer bought power. At the same time the Corps of Engineers rebuilt the dam adding a lock and auxiliary lock, and creating a higher 24 ft. head. By 1953 the plant had been modified to be 60 Hz, 8.25 megawatts, 10 generators using vertical shafts. The new dam, completed 1956, incorporated the section of old dam including the powerhouse. On November 9, 1987, a scour channel eroded under the 1897 foundations and drained the upper pond of the then Northern States owned power-plant. The powerhouse was damaged and was then removed in 1988. At the time reconstructing a power plant was determined to not be feasible.

More recently, a hydroelectric power generating system was installed in the auxiliary lock at the lower dam. The SAF Hydropower project, by Brookfield Renewables, is 8.98 megawatt plant and came online in December 2011.

=== Hennepin Island Hydroelectric Plant ===
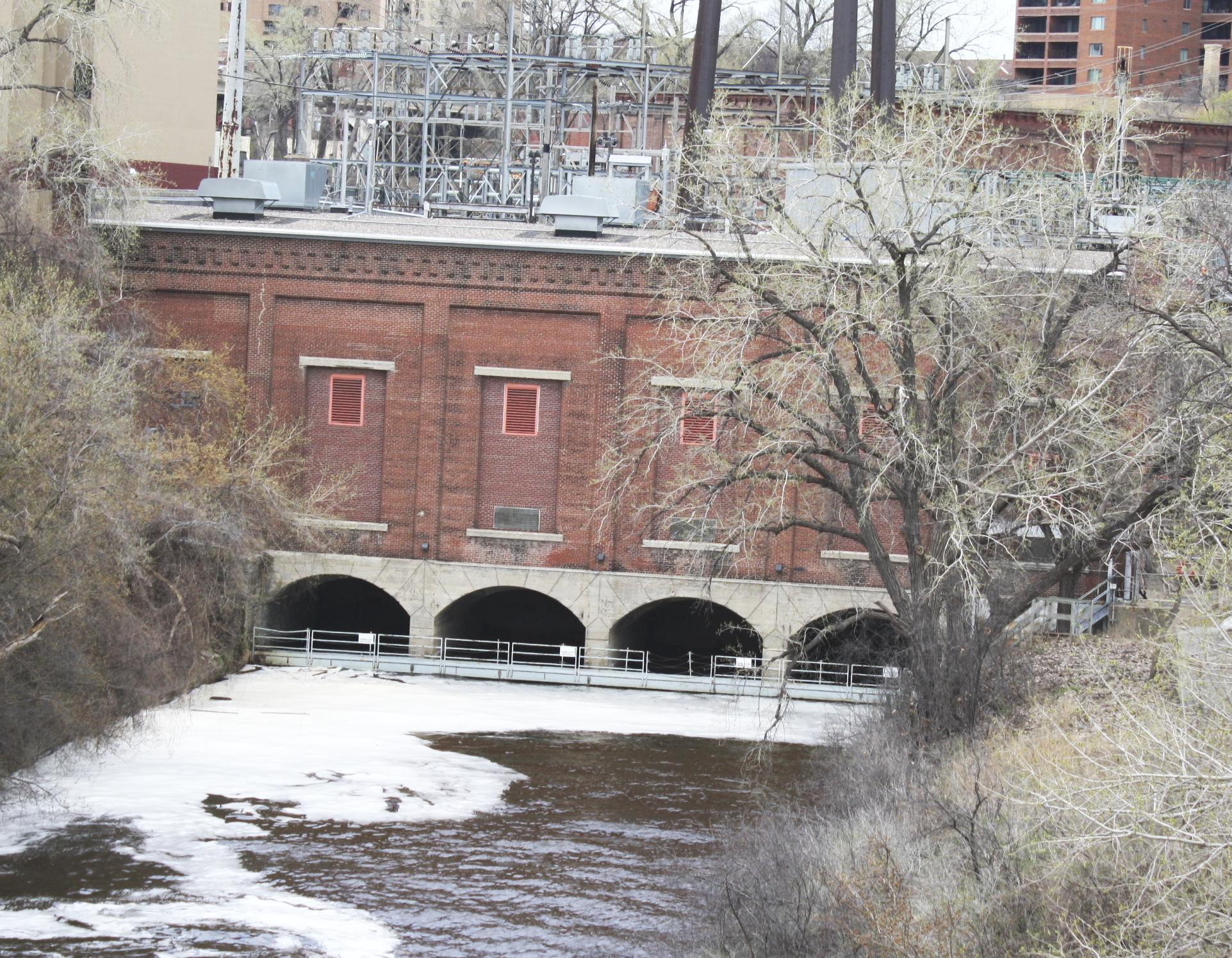
Hennepin Island Hydroelectric Plant and tailrace

In yet another De la Barre project, 1906-1908 he designed and built the Hennepin Island Hydroelectric Plant. This is the only historic plant still in operation. A 400 ft. headrace canal connects the plant to the upper pond. The plant was the first in the US to use surplus water power left over from the other lessees. The plant originally produced power at 35 Hz, 9.9 megawatts, using four horizontal shaft direct drive generators. The total output was leased to Minneapolis General Electric who provided the power to the streetcar system. In 1955 as streetcars were replaced by buses the plant was converted to 60 Hz and a fifth generator was added for a total capacity of 12.4 megawatts. The fifth generator was vertical shaft, with the turbine below the generator. This places the turbine at a lower level than horizontal shaft setups, which allows the available head to be better used. Vertical shaft installations were not practical until bearings were developed that could bear the weight of the generator rotor.

=== Consolidated Hydro Plant ===
As west bank flour mills left the Falls and the buildings were torn down, Northern States Power used the turbines at seven of the sites to generate 2.73 megawatts of electricity. This was called the Consolidated Hydro Plant. Construction of the lock at the falls blocked the "power canal" which was the headrace for the hydro sites, ending the Consolidated Hydroelectric Plant 1959.

== Modern ==
The Federal Energy Regulatory Commission now licenses hydropower projects. There are four current FERC licenses in the area: the Hennepin Island Hydroelectric Plant, the A-mill project, SAF at the lower locks and the proposed Crown Hydro project.

=== Northern States Power Company ===
Northern States Power Co currently operate the Hennepin Island Power Plant. NSP was founded in 1909 as the Consumers Power Company and would go on to acquire all of the mill assets from Pillsbury in 1923. The NSP inherited all of the historic water rights except those allotted to the St. Anthony Falls Laboratory. In 2000 NSP, through a merger with other metropolitan utilities providers PSCo and SPS, would form Xcel Energy. Under a 2004 reissued FERC license that was amended in 2011, NSP/Xcel is responsible for elements that maintain the falls including the apron/spillway, the horseshoe dam and several dams holding the upper pond, covering significant parts of the falls. The USACE's cutoff wall that fixed the Eastman tunnel disaster is not included. In 2013 it replaced the plant's turbine runners and rewound it's generators, raising it's generation capacity from 12.4 megawatts to 13.9 megawatts. The historic turbine outer shells were not changed. The changes and raised the maximum flow from 4,025 cfs to 4,366 cfs.

=== Pillsbury A-Mill Retrofit ===
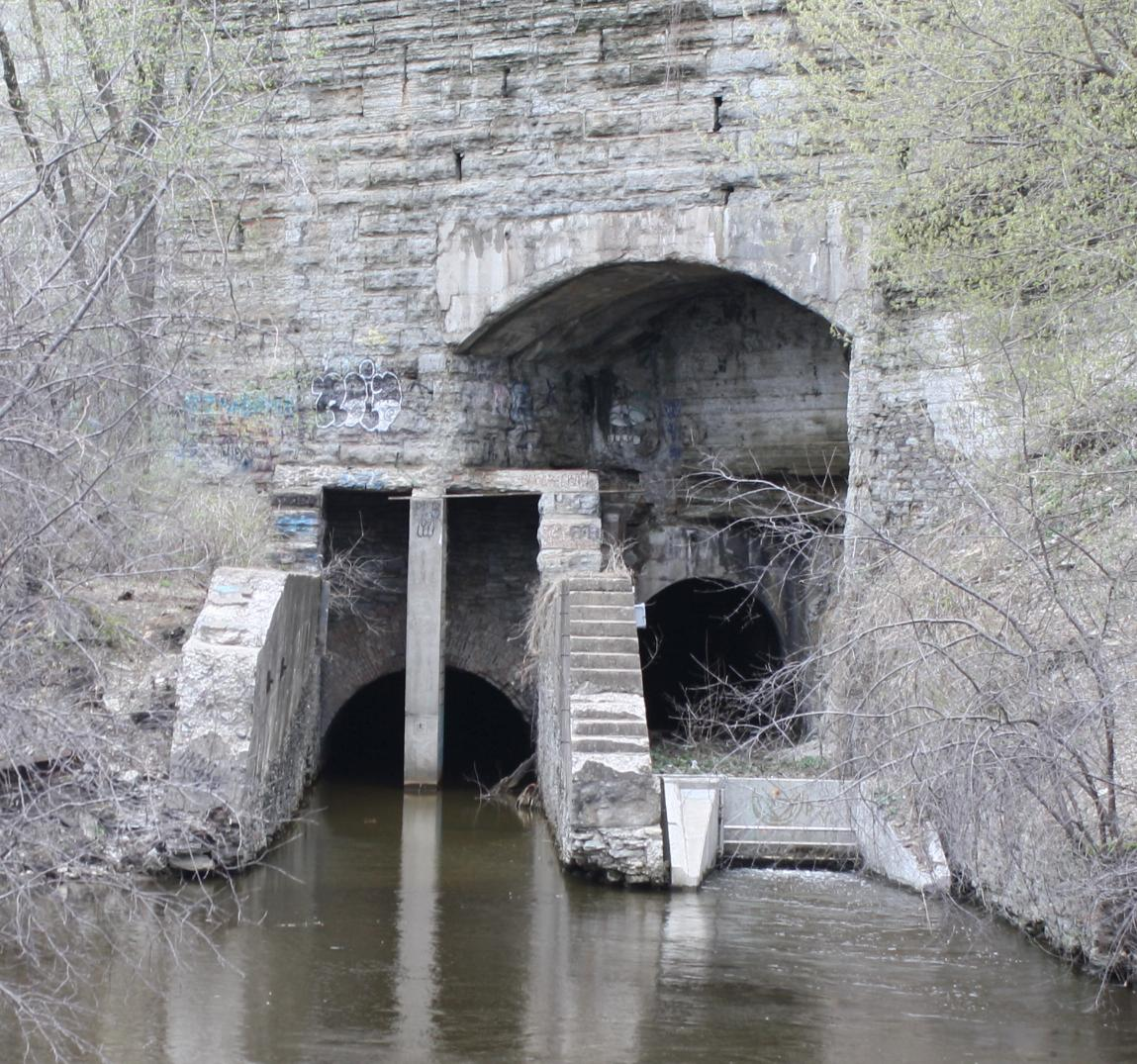
Tailrace used by the A-mill Hydroelectric project

The Mill was converted to the income limited A-Mill Artist Lofts by Dominium in 2015. As part of that conversion a hydroelectric plant was installed with a 5 ft. diameter penstock pipe in the much larger headrace tunnel, a turbine and generator in the east drop-shaft and a concrete conduit in the much larger east tailrace tunnel. All that can be seen of the project is the intake trashrack and gate driver on the riverbank at Second Ave. Southeast and water out of the east tailrace tunnel. It has production up to 0.6 megawatts, about 17% of the waterpower used by Pillsbury and came online in 2016. It's FERC license is similar to the Hennepin Island plant, allowing the A-mill to use water when there is flow more than what NSP requires. The Pillsbury A-mill has leased rights been kept up down to the present owner and have priority over flow.

=== Crown Proposal ===
The original Crown Hydro FERC license was for two generators, 3.4 megawatts total, with the generators located in the west bank Crown Roller Mill building, presumably using the original wheel pits and tailraces. Crown Hydro couldn't come to an agreement with the building owner, and proposed a license change locating the generators at the former Fuji-Ya restaurant site. The Minneapolis Park Board, owners of the site, opposed the change. FERC determined that the Park Board did own the site and Crown Hydro had no way to use it.

Crown Hydro then proposed another license change locating the generators about 250 ft. north of the Crown Roller Mill on property owned by the Corps of Engineers (associated with the locks). This location results in potential impact to numerous historic properties, particularly from a new tailrace tunnel. That requires a Section 106 review (which protects historically significant properties such as the Ida Dorsey Bordello). Review is ongoing. There is, however, strong opposition to this project, including by the Park Board.

=== Symphony Proposal ===
Symphony Hydro proposes putting generator panels inside one of the locks (which are inactive to control "flying carp"). Generation capacity would be 3.4 megawatts. This proposal would be dropped if the currently 20 year old Crown Hydro project progresses. Symphony has a preliminary FERC permit, and appears to still be alive.

== See also ==
- St. Anthony Falls Historic District
