= William Bros Boiler Works =

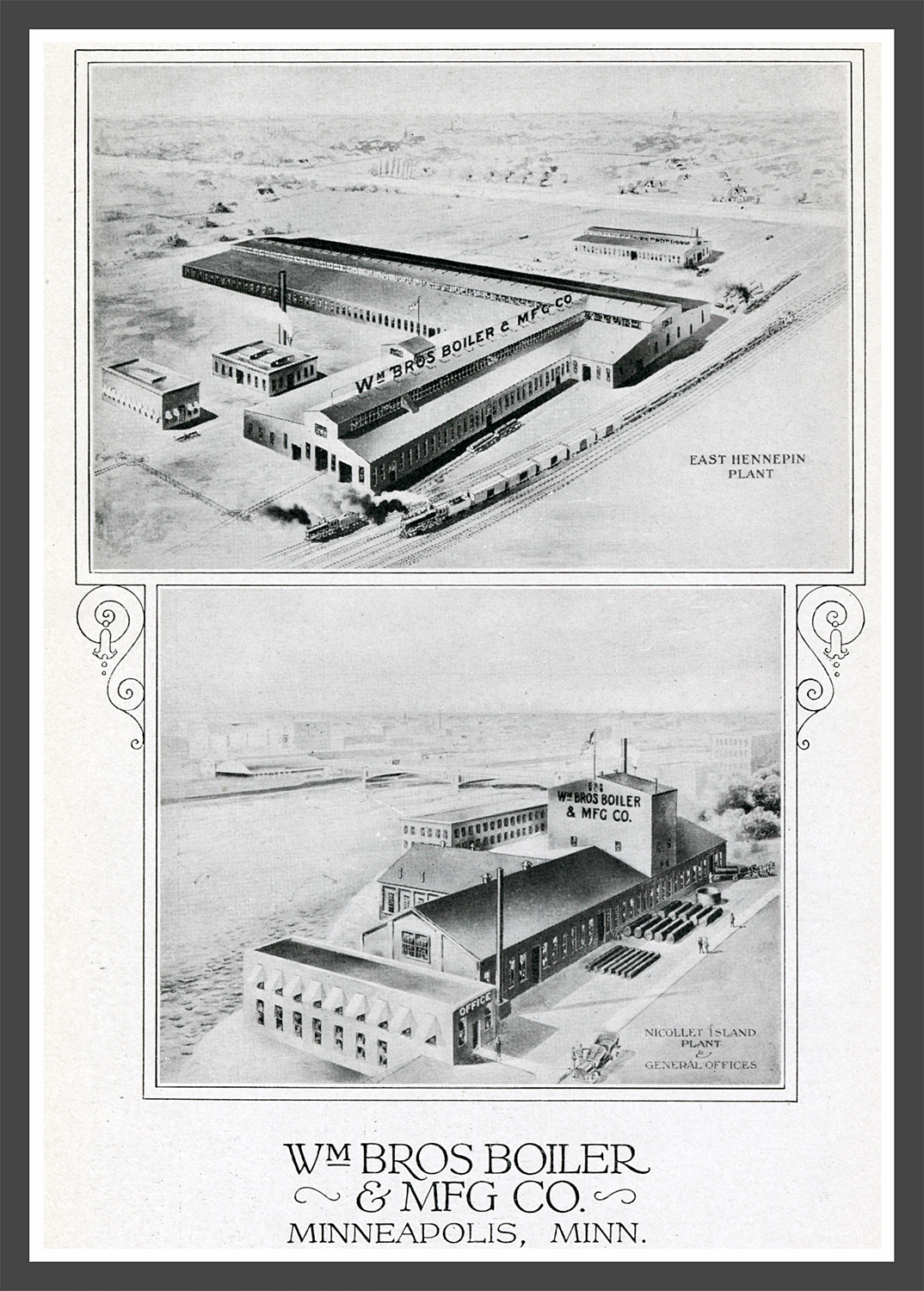

William Bros Boiler Works and Manufacturing Company was a manufacturer of boilers and other heating equipment in Minneapolis, Minnesota. It is one of the few surviving industrial buildings on Nicollet Island, and its former building is now the Nicollet Island Pavilion.

== History ==
=== Development of Nicollet Island ===
William Bros Boiler Works was founded in 1893 on Nicollet Island in Minneapolis, Minnesota.

Nicollet Island was first developed in the 1860s by William W. Eastman, a lumberman, and John Merriam, a St. Paul–based broker, who had initially proposed the area as a park (which was ultimately struck down). The pair designed the layout of the island with residential buildings on the north side of the island and industrial buildings to the south. In 1879, the Island Power Building was constructed on Merriam Street to power those industrial operations. In 1887, the Lintges, Conwell Company, another boiler manufacturer, set up shop on the island. They were based in a one-story wood-frame building.

=== Nicollet Island-Northeast Fire ===
In 1893, most of these structures were destroyed in the Nicollet Island-Northeast Fire. On the afternoon August 13, 1893, a blaze burned buildings on the island including Lenhart Wagon Works, Cedar Lake Ice House and stable, the Clark Box Factory, and the Minneapolis Brewing Company. The fire also eventually spread to Boom Island.

=== Construction of William Bros Boiler Works ===
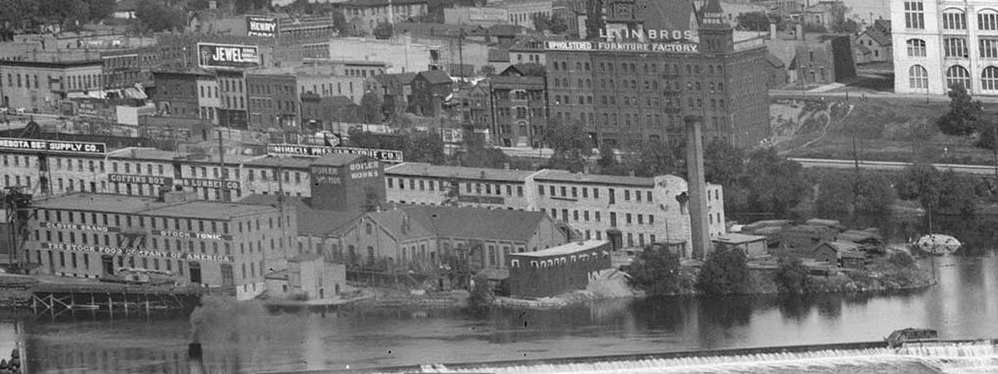
Nicollet Island in 1901. The Boiler Works can be seen in the center foreground.

The William Bros Boiler Works opened soon after the fire, building on the former Lintges, Conwell Company site. The initial building was a one-story brick building with a steel-truss gable roof. In the early 1900s, the company expanded to a new plant that was located on the corner of east Hennepin Avenue and Johnson Street. The Nicollet Island boiler factory eventually become part of the Durkee-Atwood complex, a rubber manufacturer, in 1923.

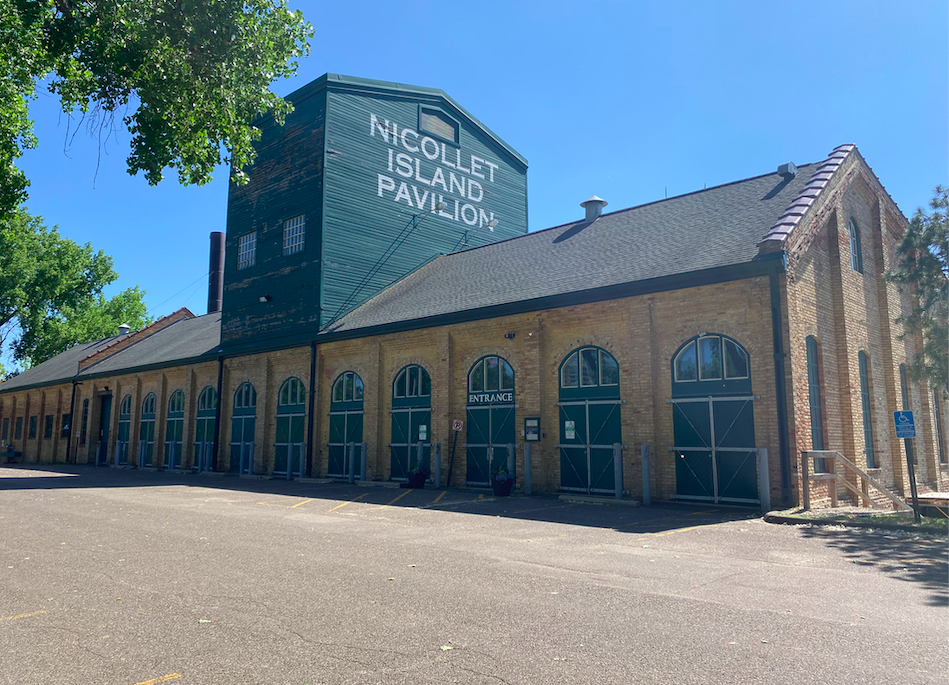
The Nicollet Island Pavilion building, 2023

=== Conversion to parks property ===
While conversations about the land on Nicollet Island becoming a park had begun when the land was developed in the 1860s, they did not come to fruition until nearly 100 years later. The first park on Nicollet Island was at its southernmost tip and had been designated in 1944 as Bicentennial Park.

In 1971, the National Park Service included the land around the nearby St. Anthony Falls on its list of National Historic Districts, and a 1972 report by city manager Tommy Thompson proposed redevelopment of the former industrial and railroad land on the island. In 1976, the Minneapolis Parks Board began plans to acquire the Nicollet Island property to create a new park, and purchased the former Boiler Works Building in 1981 (then being used by the Durkee-Atwood company). At $6.1 million for the sale, this was the parks board's most expensive land purchase to date.

At the point of becoming a park, only the Boiler Works building and the Island Sash and Door Company building remained of the former industrial locations. The latter has since become the Nicollet Island Inn, and the former Boiler Works building is now the Nicollet Island Pavilion. The pavilion was enclosed in 2003 for year-round use.

The William Bros Boiler Works' east Hennepin plant location is now an office park off of the I-35W highway.
