= Hennepin Avenue Bridge =

Bridge in Minnesota, USA

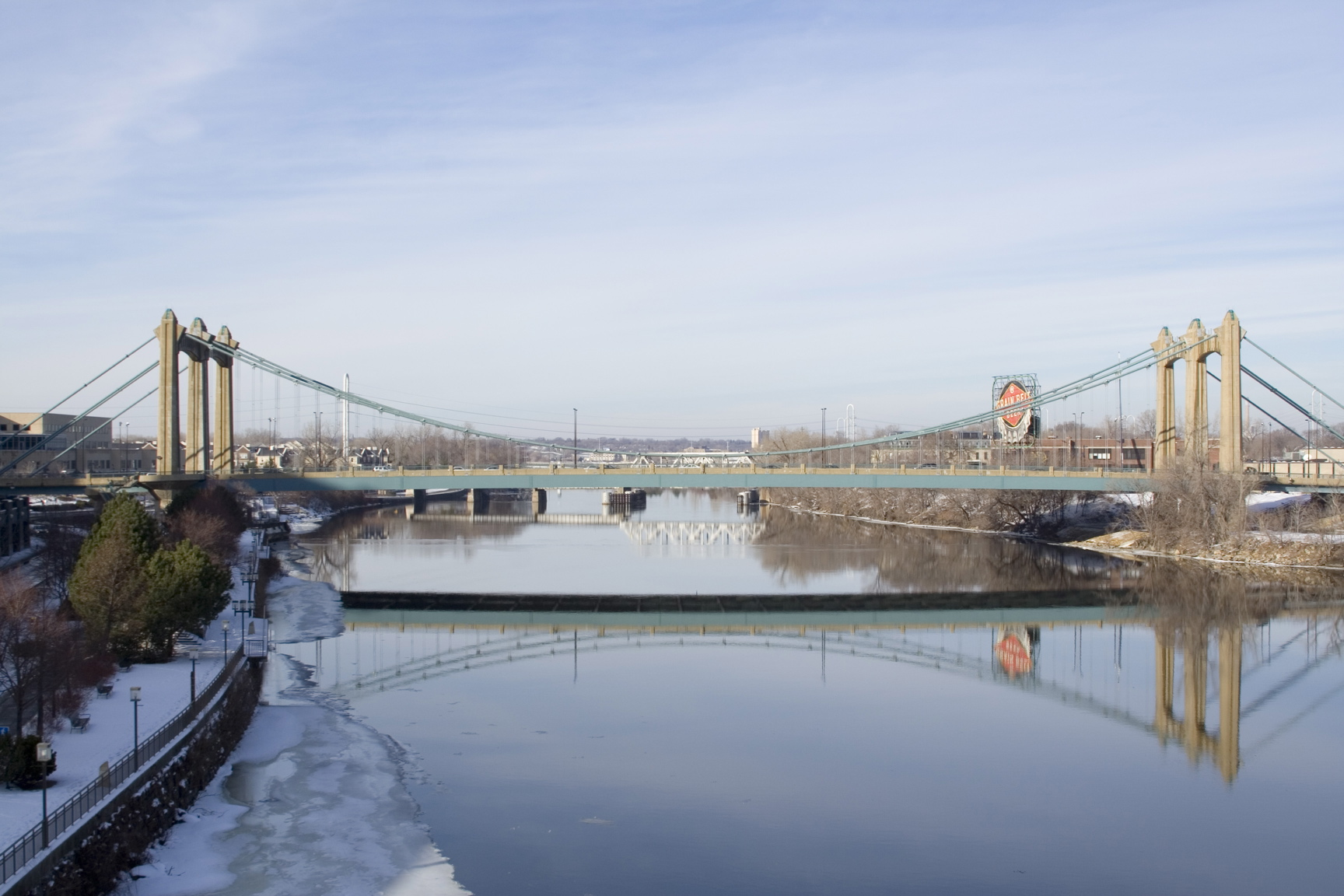
- Hennepin Avenue Bridge in 2005
- Coordinates: 44°59′07″N 93°15′50″W
- Carries: 6 lanes of Hennepin Avenue (CSAH 52)
- Crosses: Mississippi River
- Locale: Minneapolis, Minnesota, US
- Official name: Father Louis Hennepin Bridge
- Maintained by: Hennepin County
- ID number: 27636

Characteristics
- Design: Suspension bridge
- Total length: 316 metres (1,037 ft)
- Width: 41 metres (135 ft)
- Longest span: 190 metres (620 ft)
- Clearance below: 11 metres (36 ft)

History
- Designer: HNTB Corporation
- Construction cost: $28.6 million
- Opened: 1990
- Hennepin Avenue Bridges Archaeological Site
- U.S. Historic district – Contributing property
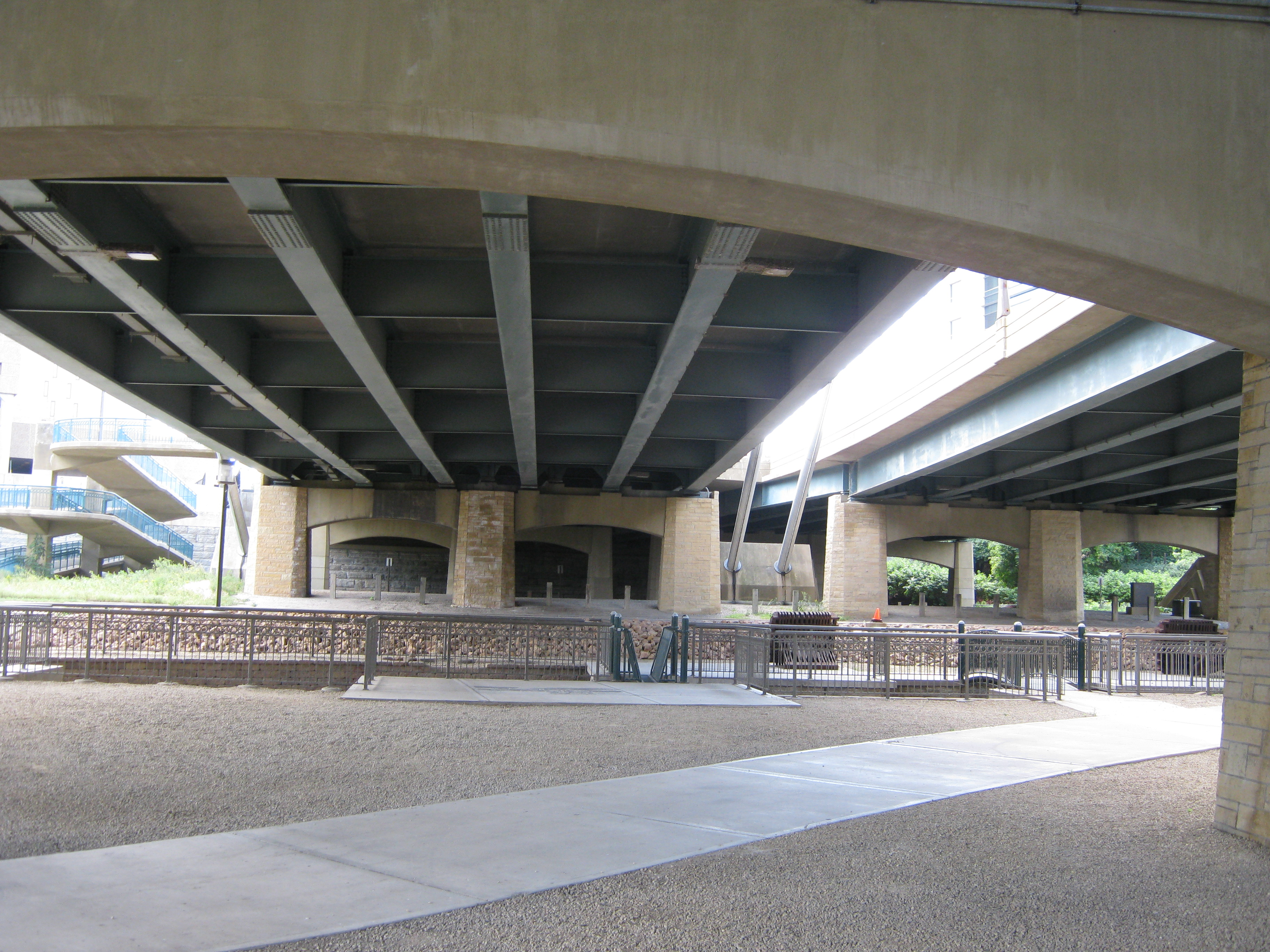
- Underneath the bridge, with a part of the original bridge on the right beyond the railing
- Part of: St. Anthony Falls Historic District (ID71000438)
- Designated CP: March 11, 1971

Location
- Interactive map of Hennepin Avenue Bridge

The Hennepin Avenue Bridge is a suspension bridge that carries Hennepin County State Aid Highway 52, Hennepin Avenue, across the Mississippi River in Minneapolis, Minnesota, United States, at Nicollet Island. Officially, it is the Father Louis Hennepin Bridge, in honor of the 17th-century explorer Louis Hennepin, the first European to see the Saint Anthony Falls. It is the fourth bridge on the site, having been preceded by the first bridge to cross the Mississippi and two other overpasses.

== History ==
=== Background ===
The bridge crosses from the west bank of the Mississippi River to Nicollet Island. Another smaller bridge crosses from the island to the east bank. Three previous bridges had been on the location, two of which were suspension bridges, while a third—which existed nearly a century—was composed of steel arch spans. The original crossing, which opened as a toll bridge on January 23, 1855, was the first permanent span across the Mississippi. Other bridges were completed in 1876 and 1888.

While the previous century-old bridge was aging, there was opposition to the plans for the new bridge. A $28.6 million price tag ($74.3 million in 2025), about three times more than a similar close by bridge, as well as a seen-as-unnecessary suspension design given the relatively short 625-foot length. Hennepin County defended the decisions, saying they wanted a "landmark" bridge at the site; comparisons were made to the Minneapolis suspension bridges of the past, as well as the Brooklyn Bridge and Golden Gate Bridge. Additionally, federal funding requested by Martin Sabo had been contingent on the construction of a suspension bridge.

=== Design ===
The bridge was designed by Howard, Needles, Tammen & Bergerndoff. The bridge could have been shorter, but twenty feet were added to the towers to avoid a squat look. The suspension design was unnecessary from an engineering perspective but hailed as being "elegant," while also having a "Mussolini kind of quality". Two 150-foot (46 m) towers hold up the two 1,037-foot (316 m) spans. Stairs and a ramp on the eastern bank connect pedestrians to West River Parkway below.

=== Construction ===
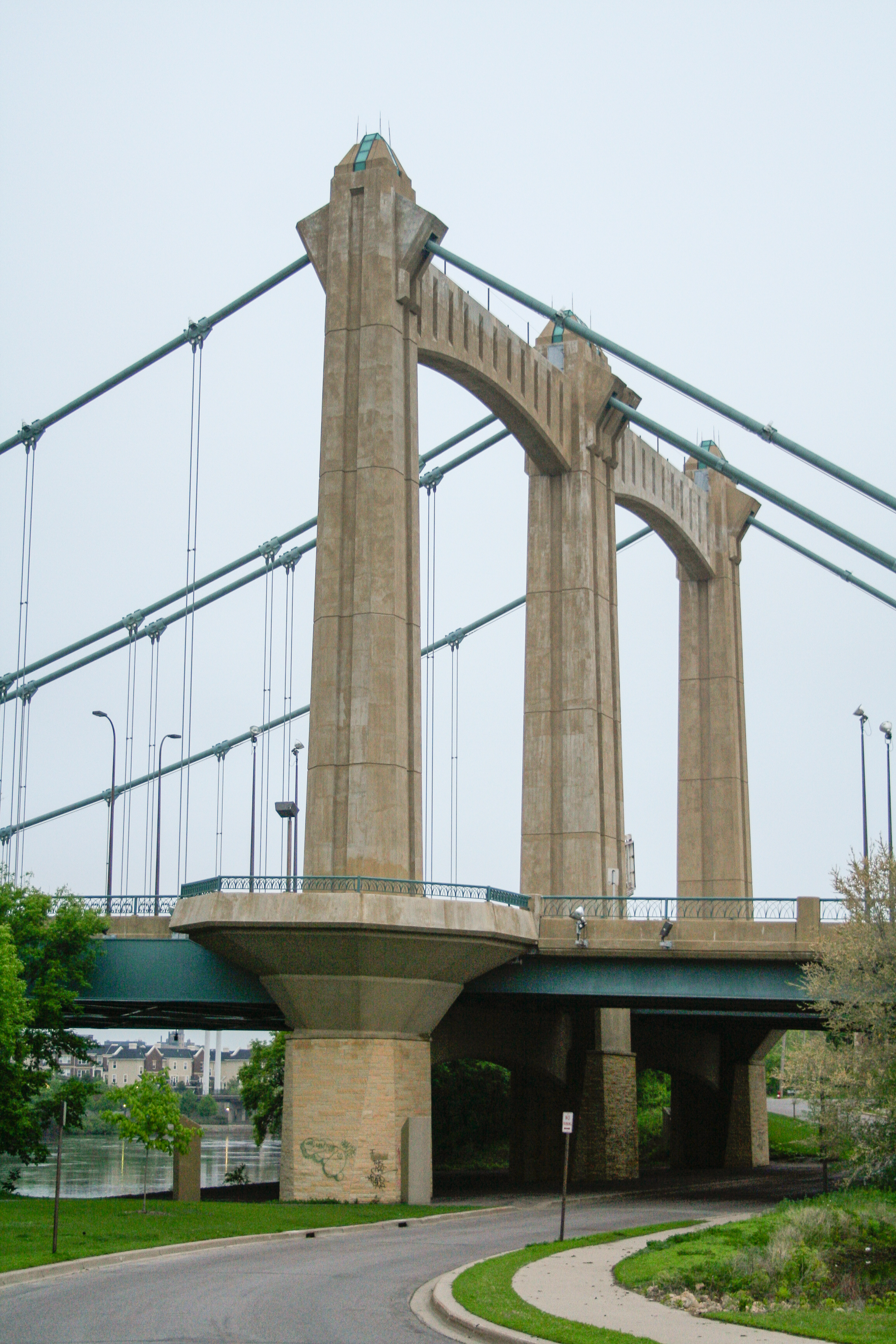
The bridge showing West River Parkway underneath

Some 900 metric tons (890 long tons; 990 short tons) of steel cable, more than 5,900 feet (1,800 m), were ordered from Bethlehem Steel Corp in Harrisburg, Pennsylvania. Johnson Bros. Corp. of Litchfield, Minnesota did the work on the suspension cables.

During construction, foundations of the 1855 bridge and 1870 bridge were uncovered and documented by the Minnesota Historical Society.

On July 31, 1989, a fire underneath the bridge blamed on vagrants caused an estimated $80,000 in damage to construction equipment. The fire was underneath a yet-undemolished part of the old bridge and did not damage the new construction. One lane of the new bridge was opened in August 1989.

In June 1990, a month before the scheduled completion of the bridge, Hennepin County spent $16,550 ($40,785 in 2025) to perform additional stress tests on the bridge, not wanting a repeat of the Golden Gate Bridge 50th anniversary celebrations where unexpectedly large crowds caused the deck of the bridge to significantly sag. Officials banned traffic-closing events and large crowds from the bridge in December 1990, finding that large crowds combined with dancing could cause unacceptable levels of stress.

All lanes of traffic on the bridge were opened for traffic on August 23, 1990. Originally budgeted at $25 million, the bridge was completed for $28.6 million. While locally known as the Hennepin Avenue Bridge, it is officially the Father Louis Hennepin Bridge after the explorer who was one of the first Europeans in the area, and whom Hennepin County was named after.

=== Renovation ===
In 2023, Howard, Needles, Tammen & Bergerndoff (the original builders of the bridge) were selected by Hennepin County to help improve the safety and service life of the bridge, as well as modify the bridge deck to facilitate easier public transit, bicycle and pedestrian use.

== Archeological site ==
Each of the three previous bridges had historic value to the City of Minneapolis. Excavations in 1983, 1985, and 1987, and construction work during the building of the current bridge in 1988 and 1989, found substantial portions of the first and second bridges. Foundations of the first bridge, tunnels used for the construction of both, and various anchors and other elements of each bridge were discovered. The archeological site was included as an official part of the St. Anthony Falls Historic District. Various pilings and artifacts exist at First Bridge Park next to the bridge.

== In popular media ==
The bridge appears in the 1992 film Crossing the Bridge. The bridge depicts a fictional border crossing between the United States and Canada in Detroit, Michigan. A review panned the lack of continuity between the far shots showing a real bridge near Detroit and the close-ups of the very different Hennepin Avenue Bridge.

== See also ==
- Grain Belt Beer Sign
- List of crossings of the Upper Mississippi River
