= Nicollet Island =

Island on the Mississippi River in central Minneapolis, Minnesota, USA

Coordinates: 44°59′15″N 93°15′48″W

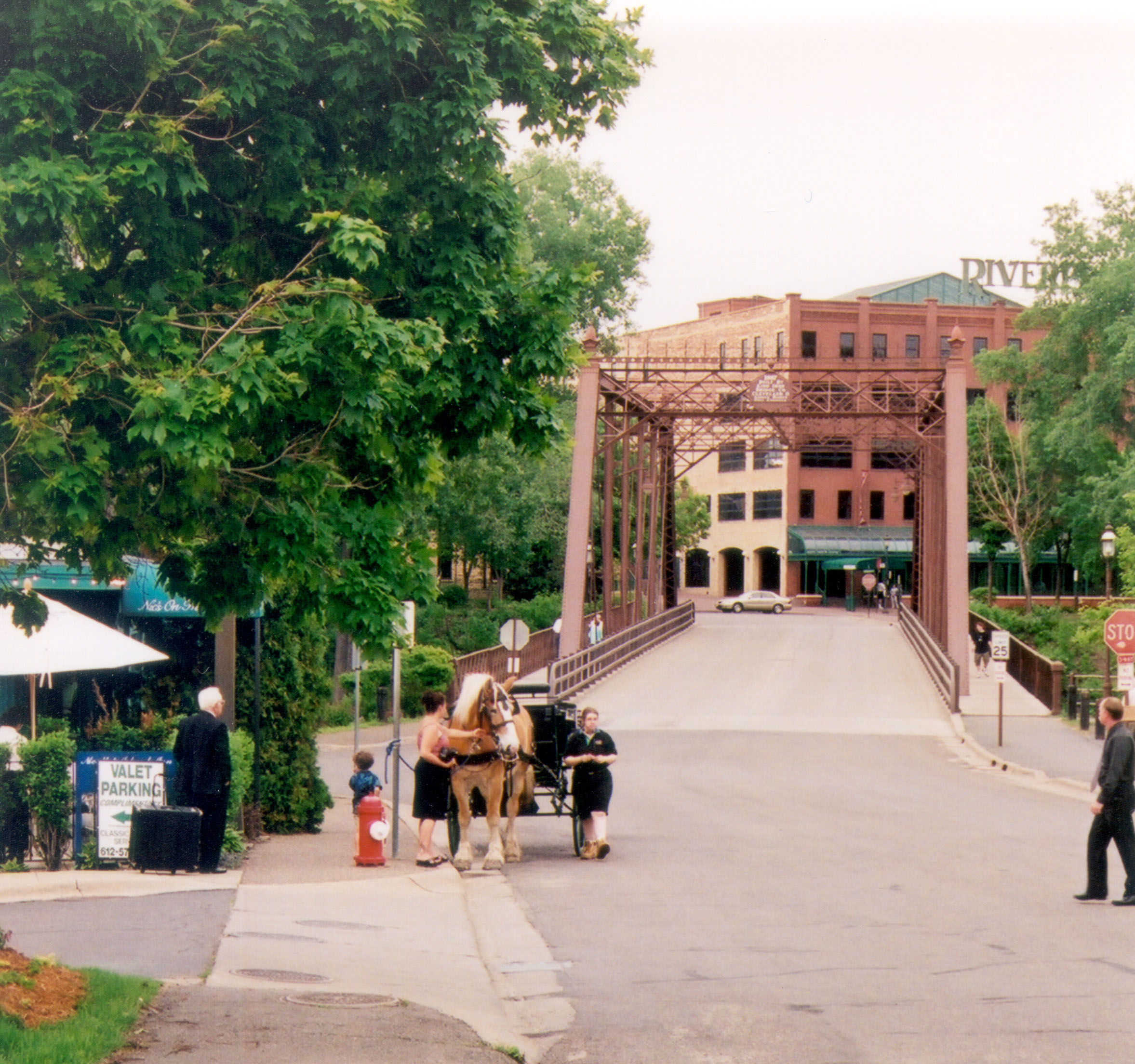
Visitors get ready for a ride in a horsedrawn carriage near the Nicollet Island Inn.

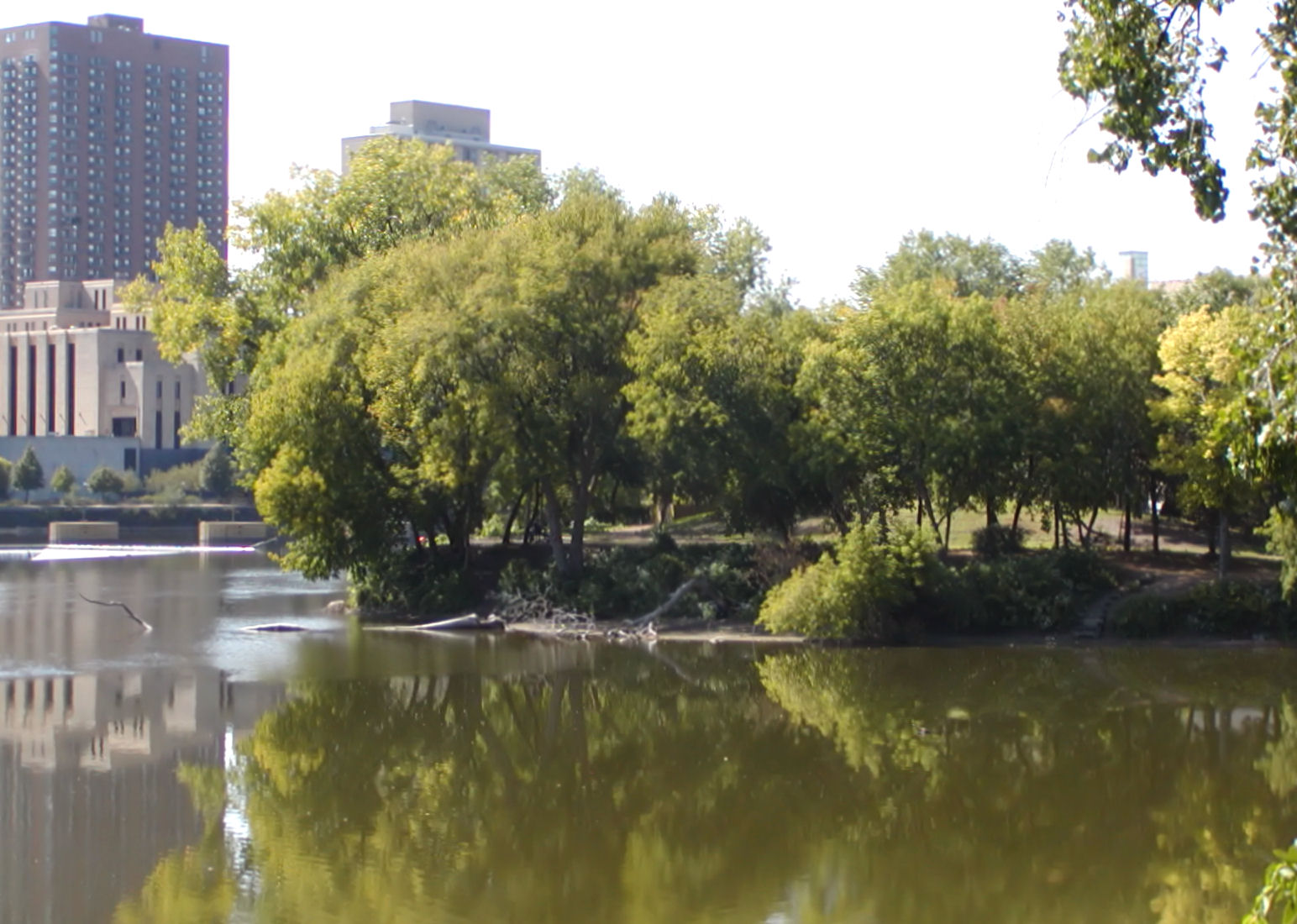
Lower end of Nicollet Island in 2006

Nicollet Island (/ˈnɪkəlɪt/ NIH-kə-lit) is an island in the Mississippi River just north of Saint Anthony Falls in central Minneapolis, Minnesota. According to the United States Census Bureau the island has a land area of 194,407 square metres (0.075 sq mi) and a 2000 census population of 144 persons. The island makes up a large part of the city-designated Nicollet Island/East Bank neighborhood. The island is named for cartographer Joseph Nicollet, who mapped the Upper Mississippi in the 1830s.

The island lies in the middle of the Mississippi, crossed by the Hennepin Avenue Bridge connecting Downtown and Northeast Minneapolis. The island is so near to Saint Anthony Falls that if the northward movement of the falls had not been stopped in the late 19th century, the island would no longer exist. In the early 19th century Nicollet Island was one of six islands near the falls, but all the others have been destroyed or joined to the east bank.

The island was the site of the first bridge across the Mississippi River, opened in 1855, on the site of the present Hennepin Avenue Bridge. It is part of Saint Anthony Falls Historic District, listed on the National Register of Historic Places.

== History ==
=== First people ===
Before the arrival of European settlers, the Minneapolis region was inhabited by the Sioux (Dakota) and Ojibwe people, to whom Saint Anthony Falls was a sacred site. The Sioux used the island as a birthing place, and according to their oral tradition for ceremonies such as the vision quest and as a neutral meeting site.

=== European-American settlement ===
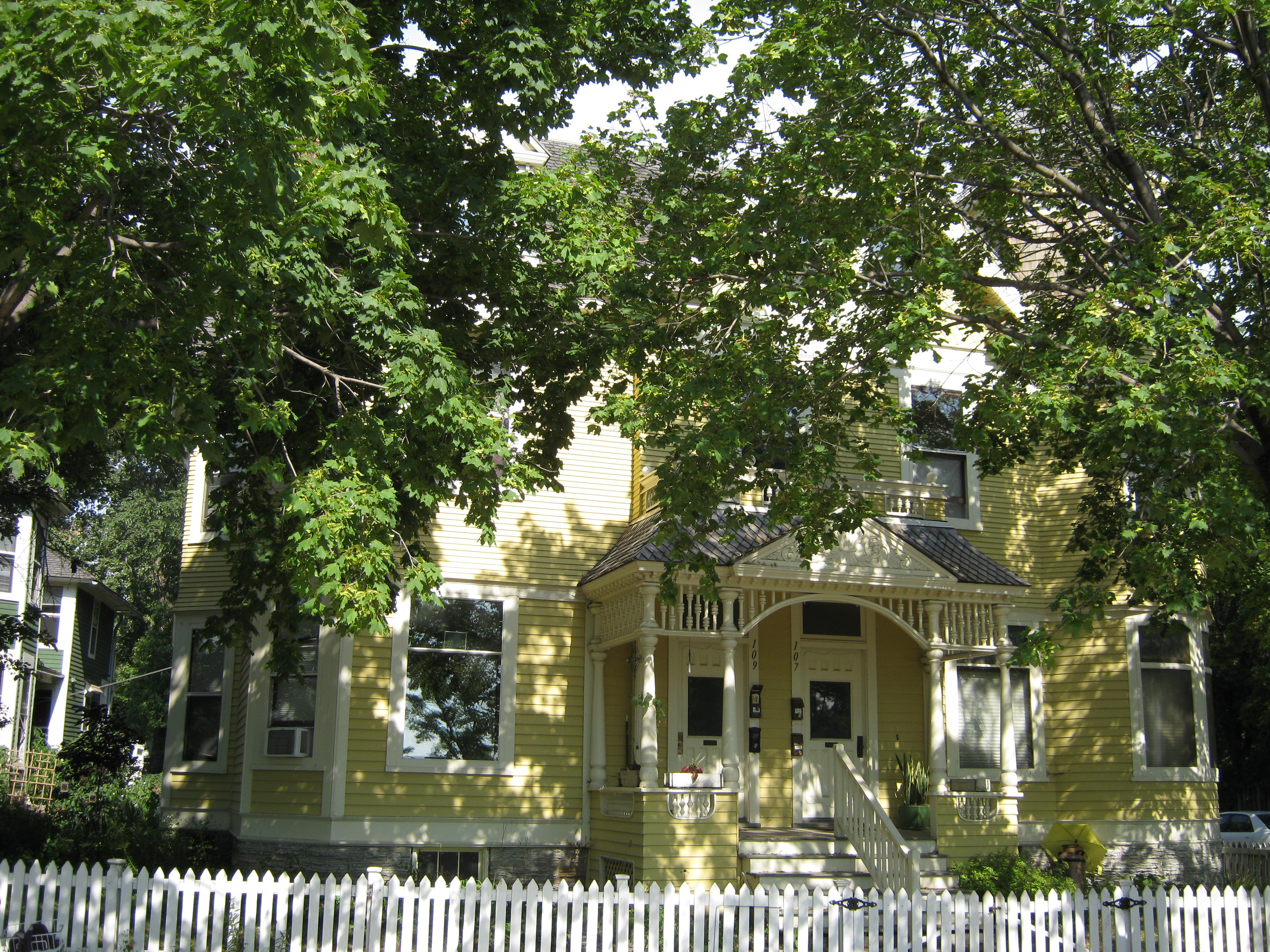
Franklin Griswold's house at 163 Nicollet Street

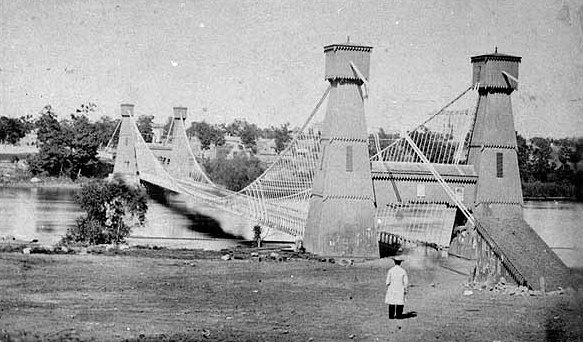
The original bridge across the Mississippi

Nicollet Island and the rest of the area of the falls were opened to settlement in 1838. Several settlers tried to obtain the best land near the falls, of whom Fort Snelling's sutler, Franklin Steele, took the best part of the east bank including Nicollet Island. He purchased the land for $1.25 per acre, which comes to about $60 for the island. After Steele obtained proper title to his land in 1848, he turned his energies to building a sawmill at Saint Anthony Falls to cut lumber from upriver, which began operations in September 1848. He built a dam on the east channel of the river between Nicollet Island and Hennepin Island. Steele platted the town-site of St. Anthony, which became a large city before merging with Minneapolis in 1872, on the east bank of the river. In 1848, Steele started a ferry across the river on the present site of the Hennepin Avenue Bridge.

In 1849 the first house was built on the island, for John Wesley and Ann Loomis North. Over the 1850s and early 1860s, more houses were built on the island, including several built by Franklin C. Griswold (some of which are extant). The island remained thickly covered with trees, and was described as a picturesque location frequented by lovers. A bridge was built between Nicollet Island and the east bank, and in 1854, Minneapolis and St. Anthony decided to build a bridge across the river. The suspension bridge that was built was the first ever to cross the Mississippi, and it opened with festivities on 23 January 1855. It was a toll bridge, originally charging 5 cents per pedestrian and 25 cents per team. The bridge was unsound and had limited capacity: photographs show signs that warned of fines for crossing too fast. The bridge brought the two communities closer together, leading to St. Anthony's later merge with Minneapolis.

=== Late 19th century ===
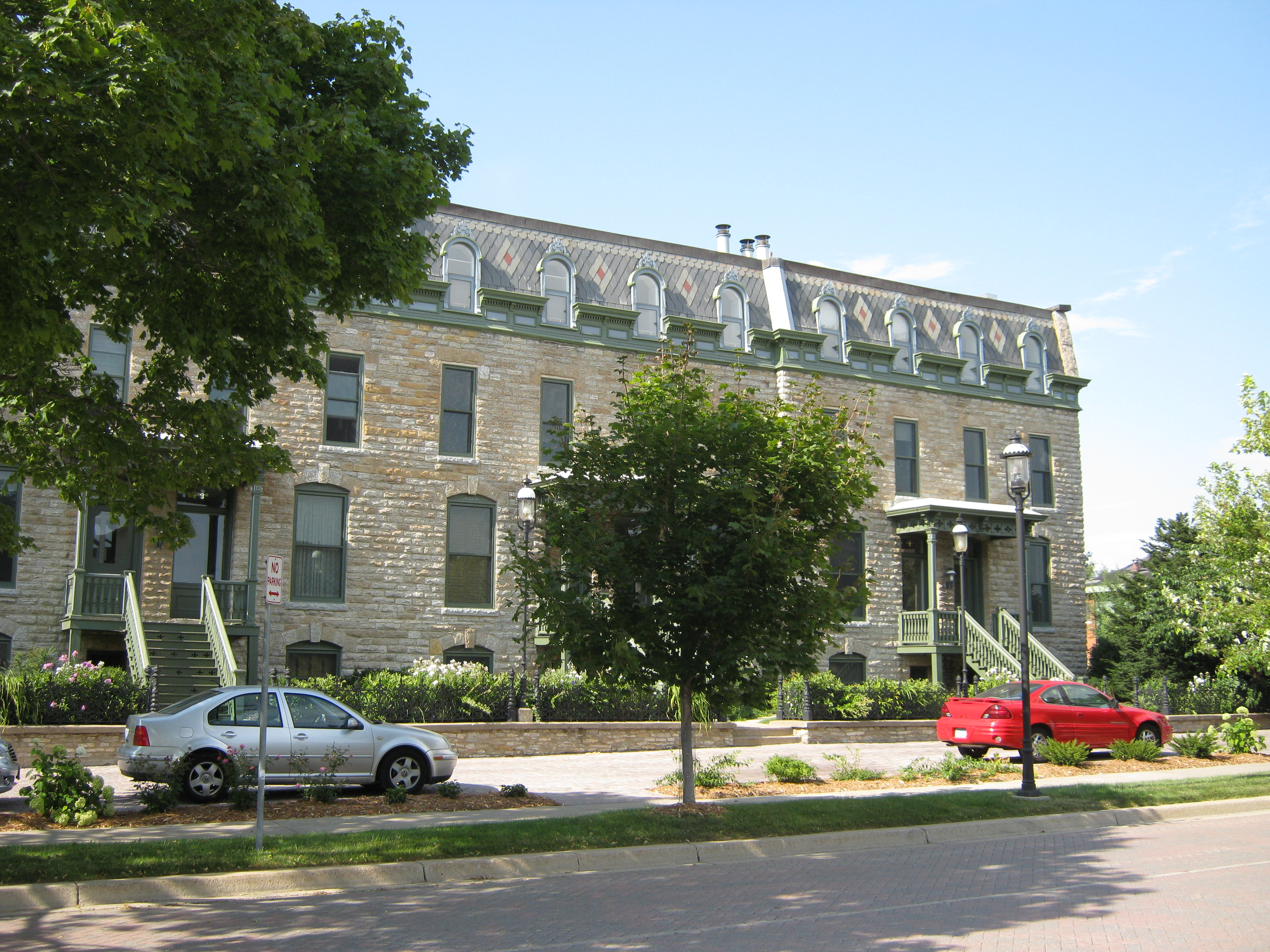
The Grove Street Flats

Extensive development of the island began after it was bought by William W. Eastman and John L. Merriam in 1865. In 1866, Eastman and Merriam tried to sell the island to the city of Minneapolis, to be a park, but the proposal was rejected in a referendum. Eastman and Merriam began building mills on the south side of the island and the Eastman tunnel, and residential buildings on the north side. The Eastman tunnel extended from Nicollet Island to the south end of Saint Anthony Falls via Hennepin Island. The tunnel collapsed in 1869, and almost destroyed Saint Anthony Falls. The fix was a concrete dike (wall) built by the Corps of Engineers just upstream from the falls all the way across the river from just under the limestone cap down as much as 40 feet (12 m). After the failure of the tunnel, Eastman built a system of turbines at the falls and overhead cables to provide hydropower to factories on the south end of the island, including the Island Power Building (razed in 1937, it contained a variety of shops), a plant of the Cedar Lake Ice Company, and the Island Sash and Door Company (now the Nicollet Island Inn).

Eastman had his relatives and friends build their houses on the island, and built the Eastman and Grove Street Flats. Eastman's efforts lead many of the city's Gilded Age wealthy to live on the island, in the later decades of the 19th century. In 1876, a replacement suspension bridge across the Mississippi was opened. In 1867 the first railway bridge across the Mississippi in Minneapolis was built, separating the industrial south of the island and the residential north, as the Minneapolis BNSF Rail Bridge (an 1893 replacement) still does.

In 1893, northeast Minneapolis was devastated by one of the most damaging fires in Minneapolis history, which started on Nicollet Island. In 1900 Lasallian Brothers started DeLaSalle High School on the island.

=== Early 20th century ===
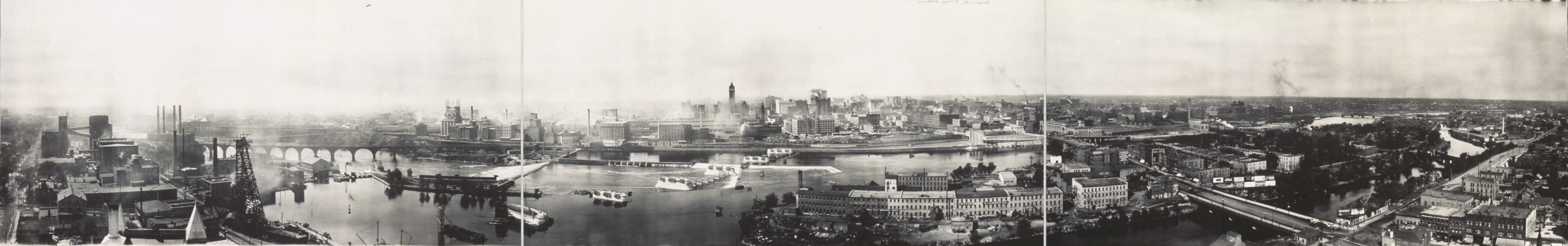
The Mississippi riverfront and Saint Anthony Falls in 1915. In the foreground to the right are Nicollet Island and the Hennepin Avenue Bridge. The left side of the island, currently a park and the Nicollet Island Inn, is filled with milling buildings. At left, Pillsbury, power plants and the Stone Arch Bridge. The Washburn "A" Mill is across the river just to the left of the falls. At center left are Northwestern Consolidated mills. The tall building is Minneapolis City Hall.

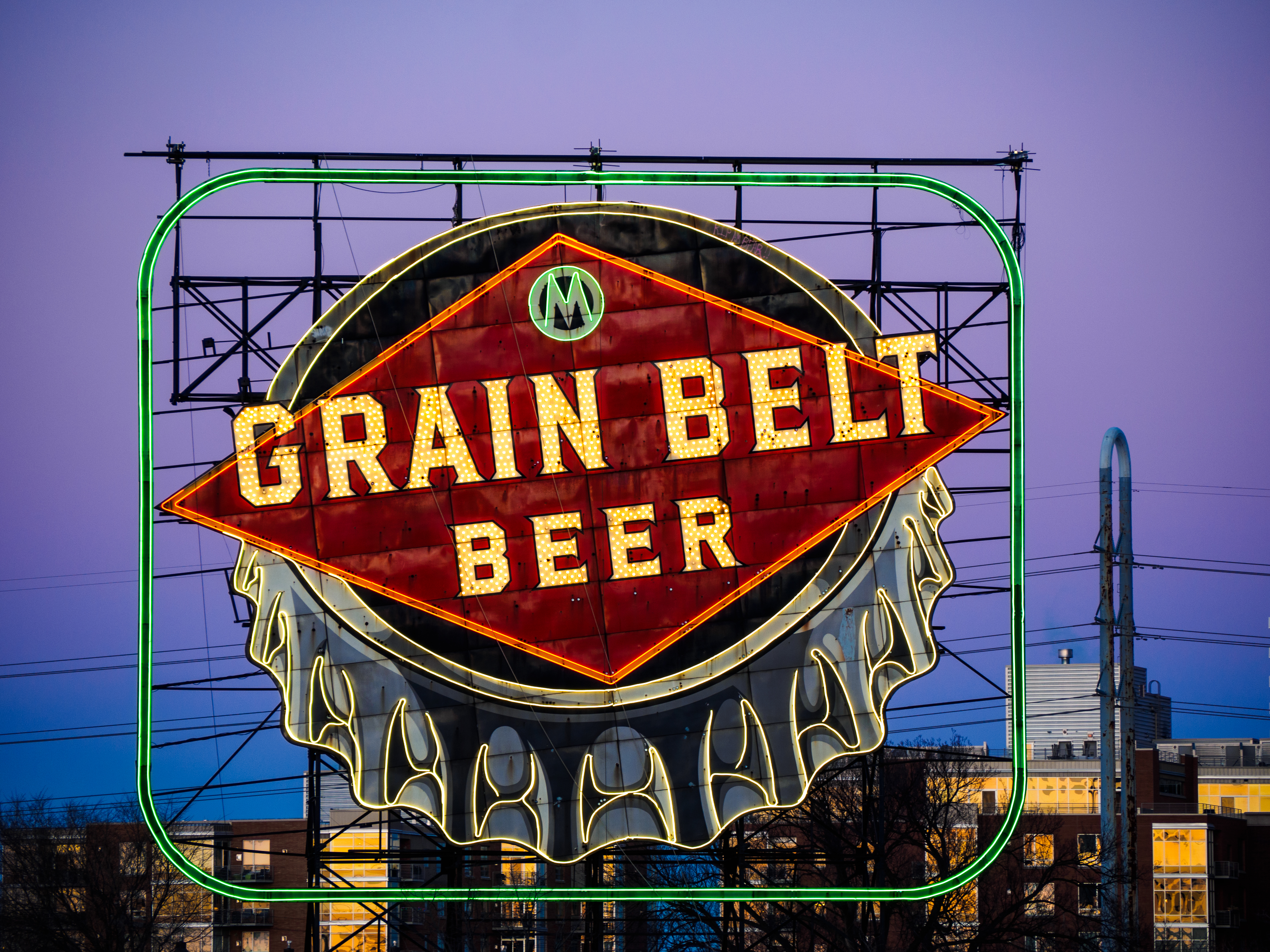
The Grain Belt Beer Sign, erected in the 1940s

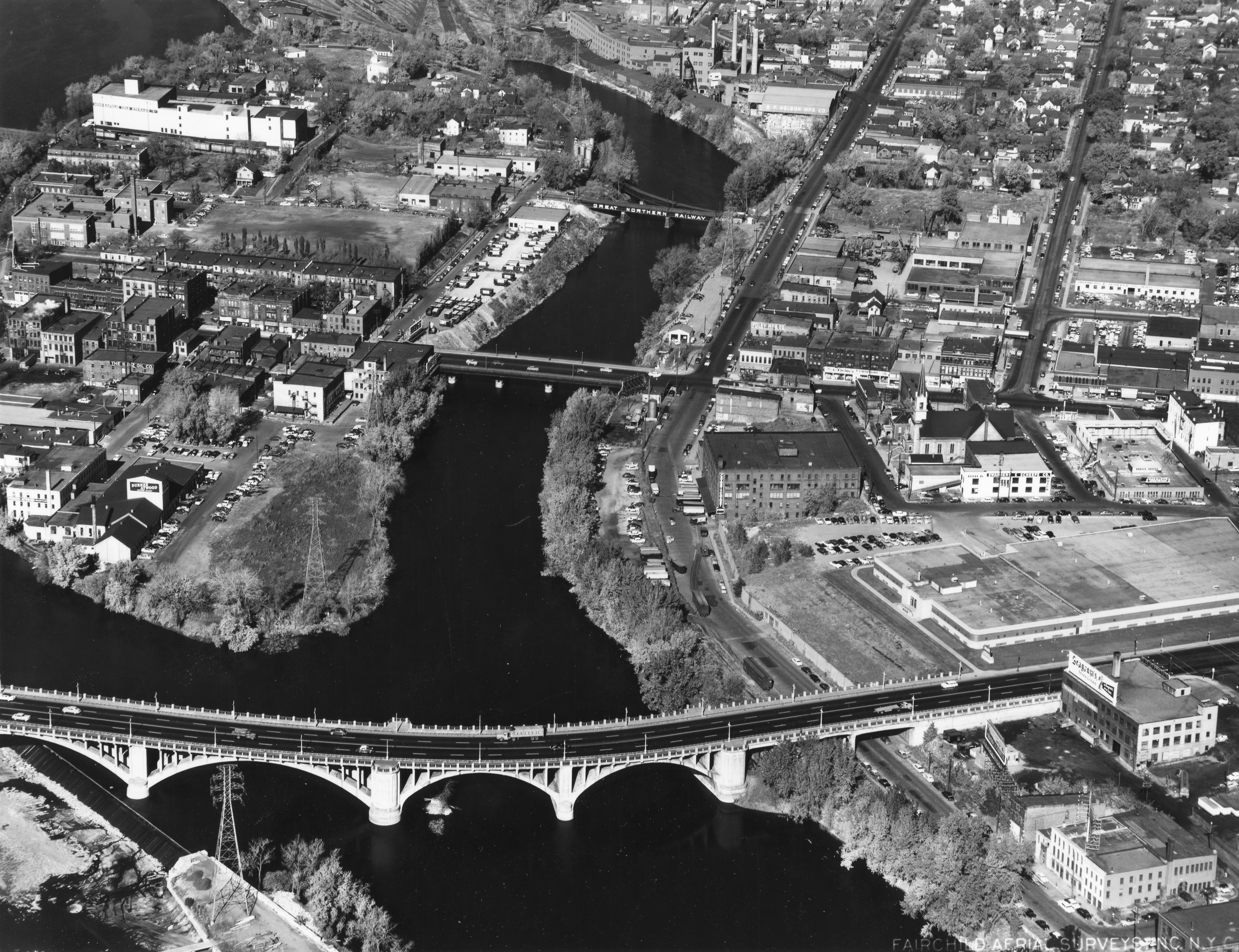
Nicollet Island and the East Bank, ca. 1955

From the 1910s, Nicollet Island and the rest of the Gateway District declined, and the flats and houses on Nicollet Island were subdivided to create cheaper housing. The island became a poor neighbourhood, owned by a few landlords, who provided little maintenance to its residential buildings. The family of Morris Lerner came to own much of the island, and ran the Island Grocery there. The Lerners were described as generous by sometime tenants and ran their store at a loss, but were described as slumlords by disgruntled tenants and the city newspapers. During the 1960s, David Lerner entered into a long and public dispute with Nicollet Island residents who formed a tenants union. The tenants picketed outside his store and his home on Cedar Lake, and in response Lerner told a newspaper that his tenants were either "nice ones" or "pigs", citing the poor condition his tenants left his properties in. In the 1940s, the iconic Grain Belt Beer sign was erected on the island, at the time one of the largest neon signs in the country. DeLaSalle expanded over the 20th century, demolishing and building on the site of the Eastman Flats. It became a college preparatory school, and went coeducational in 1971 by absorbing a Catholic girls' school.

=== Late 20th century ===
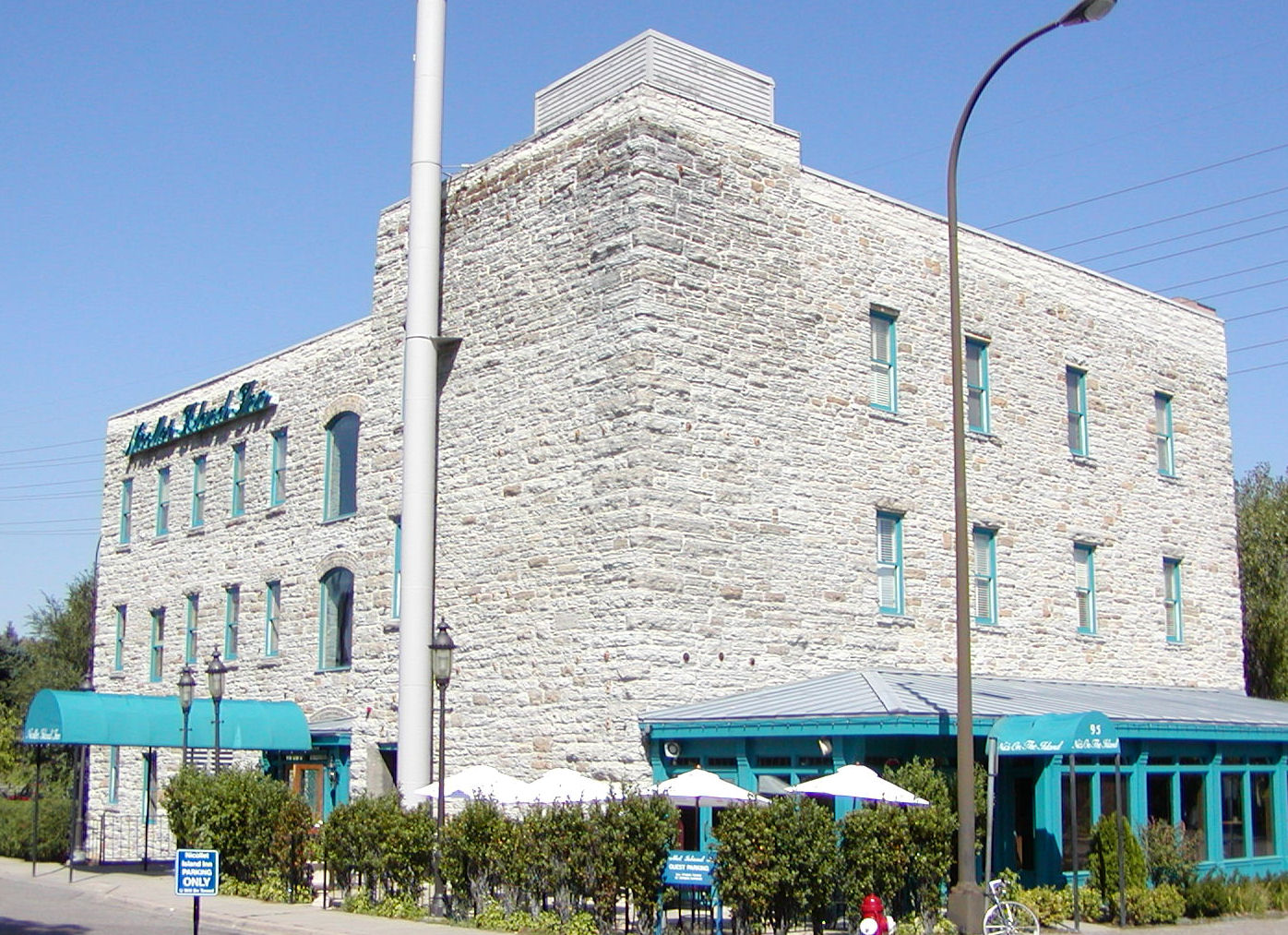
Nicollet Island Inn

Starting in the 1950s, northern downtown was redeveloped by the city and state government, which made numerous plans to redevelop the island. Most proposals involved razing the historic buildings of the island, and in many cases replacing them with new buildings such as high-rise apartments. In addition to various housing developments, proposals included a parking lot, an amusement park, a "historic village", and a conservation museum. City agencies favored using the island to increase recreational space near Downtown. Island residents resisted any change. In the 1970s, the island became a concern of preservationists and was included with the rest of the Saint Anthony Falls district on the National Register of Historic Places.

In the 1970s the Minneapolis Park and Recreation Board made plans to make most of the island into an open area, which initially called for razing the buildings on the island, citing the cost of restoration and the value of a larger park near Downtown. In 1979 the Park Board began acquiring large parts of the island with funds from the Metropolitan Council, with a plan that would keep only the houses on the west side of the island, making the east side an open space, and keeping only the Island Sash and Door Company among the island's other buildings. Because of the concerns of preservationists and residents, a further compromise redevelopment plan was made, and finalised in 1983. Following this plan, the Park Board restored the homes on the island and now owns them, but the previous residents were allowed to remain with 99-year leases despite the high cost of restoration. The controversies resurfaced when DeLaSalle tried to build a football field, which only went ahead after a ruling by the Minnesota Court of Appeals in 2007.

== Architecture ==
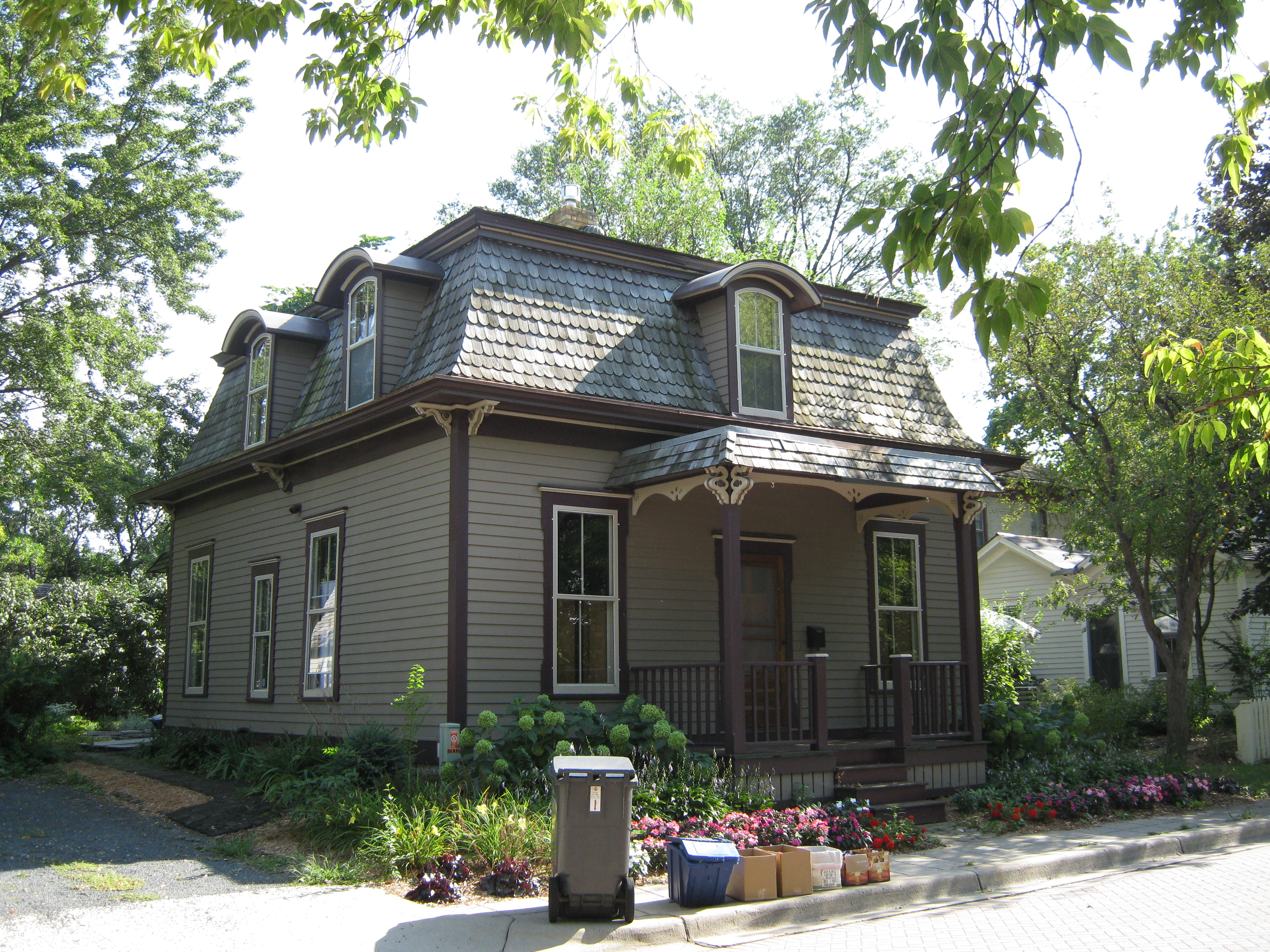
27 Maple Place, one of the smaller houses on the island, which was built in the French Second Empire style, complete with a mansard, unusual for such a small house.

DeLaSalle High School, a Catholic, preparatory high school, and the Nicollet Island Inn are located on the island, as well as three multi-family residential buildings and twenty-two restored Victorian-era houses on the north end of the island. The Inn was built in 1893 as the Island Sash and Door Company, and was a Salvation Army men's shelter from 1913 to the 1970s.

The south end of the island is home to the Nicollet Island Pavilion event center and the Bell of Two Friends, a gift from the city of Ibaraki, Osaka, Japan. The pavilion was built in 1893 as the William Bros Boiler Works.
