= Pillsbury A-Mill =

- U.S. National Register of Historic Places
- U.S. National Historic Landmark
- U.S. Historic district – Contributing property
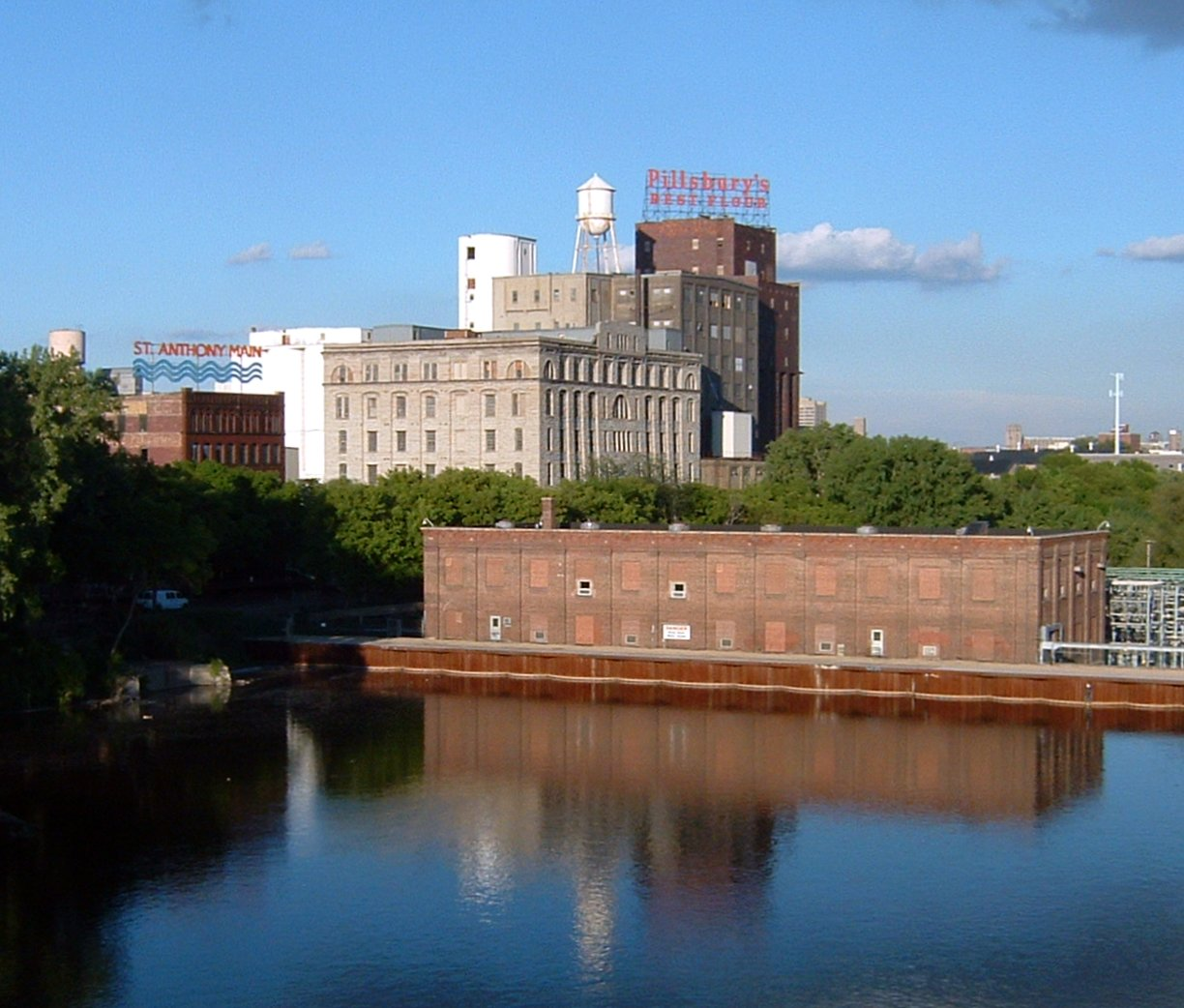
- Pillsbury A-Mill in 2005
- Location: 116 3rd Avenue SE, Minneapolis, MN
- Coordinates: 44°59′2.18″N 93°15′9.59″W
- Built: 1881
- Architect: LeRoy Buffington
- Part of: St. Anthony Falls Historic District (ID71000438)
- NRHP reference No.: 66000402

Significant dates
- Added to NRHP: November 13, 1966
- Designated NHL: November 13, 1966
- Designated CP: March 11, 1971

The Pillsbury A-Mill is a former flour mill located on the east bank of the Mississippi River in Minneapolis, Minnesota. It was the world's largest flour mill for 40 years. Completed in 1881, it was owned by the Pillsbury Company and operated two of the most powerful direct-drive waterwheels ever built, each capable of generating 1,200 horsepower (890 kilowatts). In 1901 one of the turbines was replaced with a 2,500 horsepower one. Both the mill and its headrace tunnel are contributing resources to the St. Anthony Falls Historic District, which is listed on the National Register of Historic Places. The mill is also independently on the NRHP. The mill was named a National Historic Landmark in 1966 and has since been converted into the A-Mill Artist Lofts.

== History ==
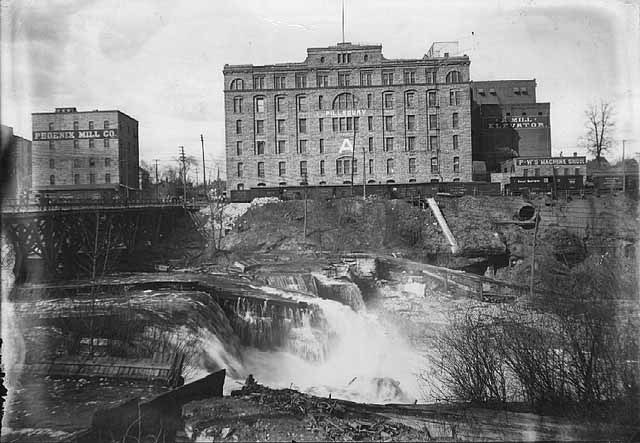
Pillsbury A-Mill circa 1900

In 1879, after five years of secret planning, Charles Alfred Pillsbury announced to the public that he would build the largest and most advanced flour mill the world had ever seen. He had traveled to mills all over the world, searching for the best technique for milling flour on a large scale. Despite the convention of the time, Pillsbury decided that he wanted his new mill to be designed by an architect in order to make the building visually appealing. Architect LeRoy S. Buffington, with the loose advice of several engineers, carried out the design. Construction started in 1880 and was finished in 1881 under a contractor named George McMullen. The mill was built to put out 5,000 barrels a day at a time when a 500-barrel mill was considered large. Eventually the capacity increased to 17,500 barrels a day. However, for some years the mill was not operated at full capacity.

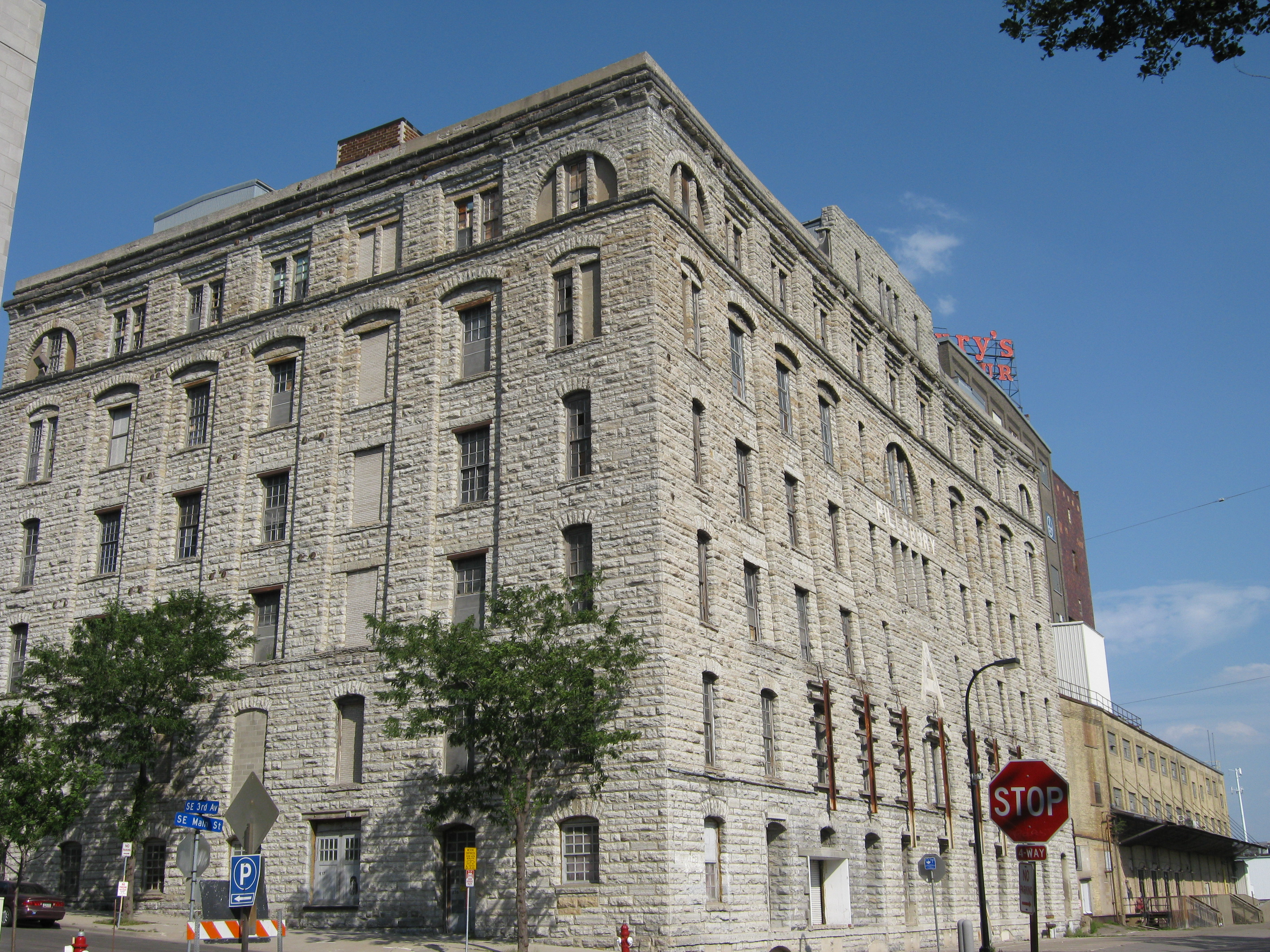
The front of the A-Mill in 2010, showing the bows in the wall and reinforcements

When it was still in use, the seven floors and the basement of the mill all had specific purposes. The basement held a transformer vault, water inlets, and an electrical room. On the first floor there was a small floor-mounted sifter, a larger ceiling-hung sifter, and a pressure tank. On the second floor there were conveyor belts and a staff lunchroom. The third floor contained more belts and bins and the fourth floor held a dust collector, centrifugal machine, gyration shifter, grinder, scale, and a packing bin. The fifth floor held a sifter, separator, and a centrifugal machine. The sixth floor held flour bins and the seventh floor was an electrical room.

In 2003, production in the mill ceased and the mill lay empty. The building was then acquired by local developer Shafer Richardson. In 2006 they launched plans to convert and preserve the A-Mill complex as the rebranded East Bank Mills, a loft-style apartment complex containing 759 to 1,095 housing units. However, this redevelopment plan fell through due to financial matters.

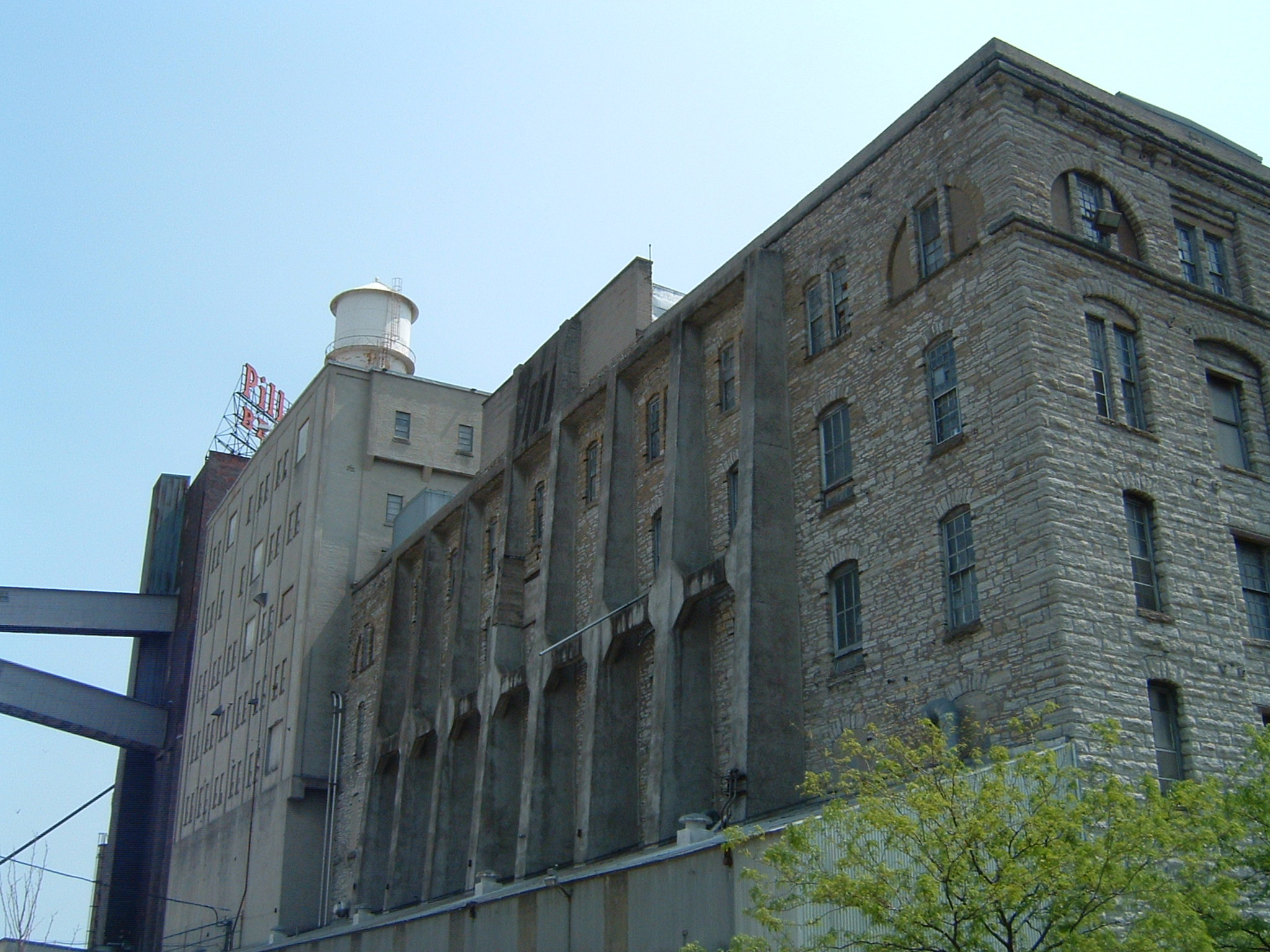
Reinforcements at the back of the A-Mill in 2003

In 2011, the National Trust for Historic Preservation included the mill on its annual list of 11 Most Endangered Places.

In 2013, Twin Cities-based developer Dominium gained approval for a $100 million renovation plan to transform the A-Mill into 251 affordable live/work artist lofts. The exterior of the mill was conserved in order to preserve the historical architecture of the building. However, major changes were made to the interior of the mill and the courtyard behind it. The overall project, which included other buildings within the complex, cost a total $175 million.

The building was added to the National Register of Historic Places in 1966 and is a National Historic Landmark.

== Architecture and engineering ==
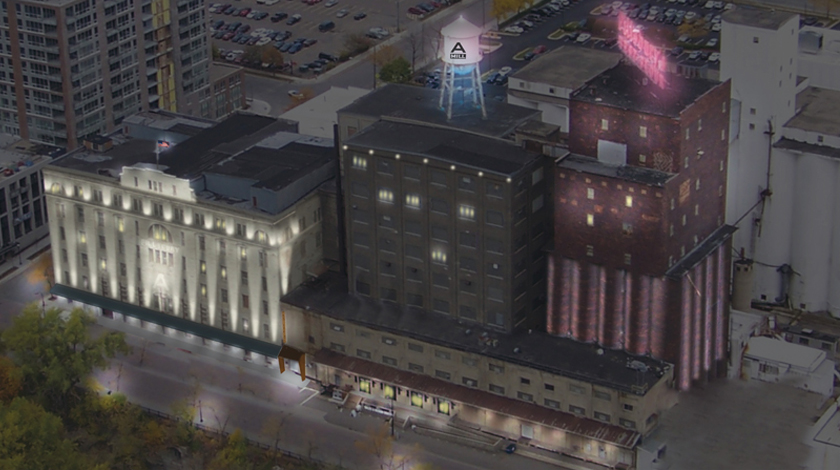
A projected rendering of the A-Mill Artist Lofts

On the outside, the Pillsbury A-Mill is a rectangular structure measuring 175 by 115 feet (53 by 35 m). The foundations are of Platteville limestone. The exterior wall thickness varies from 8 ft 0 in (2.44 m) thick at the basement to 2 ft 0 in (0.61 m) thick at the top of the building. The outside walls are of load-bearing stone with heavy timber framing on the interior (the timber was added after the completion of the building). There are six chimneys on the flat, gravel roof of the building.

Due to vibrations of milling machines and poor design, the mill was fortified in 1905. Certain sections were rebuilt in the process. To this day, the walls bow inward 22 inches (560 mm) on the top. Unlike other similarly large mills in the area, most notably the Washburn A Mill, the Pillsbury A-Mill never exploded or caught fire. As a result, it still contains its original wood frame.

During the renovation project, a new hydroelectric turbine was installed in a tunnel below the complex. The same tunnel was originally used to mechanically power milling equipment with diverted river water. Due to the significant investment made in sustainable features such as the hydro-electric turbine and a hydrothermal system providing 75% of the building's energy needs, the project achieved LEED Gold Certification in 2017.

== See also ==
- Washburn A Mill
- St. Anthony Falls Historic District
- List of National Historic Landmarks in Minnesota
- National Register of Historic Places listings in Hennepin County, Minnesota
- Saint Anthony Falls - Industry
- St. Anthony Falls Hydroelectric Development - A-Mill
