= A. A. Ames =

American politician (1842–1911)

Doc Ames
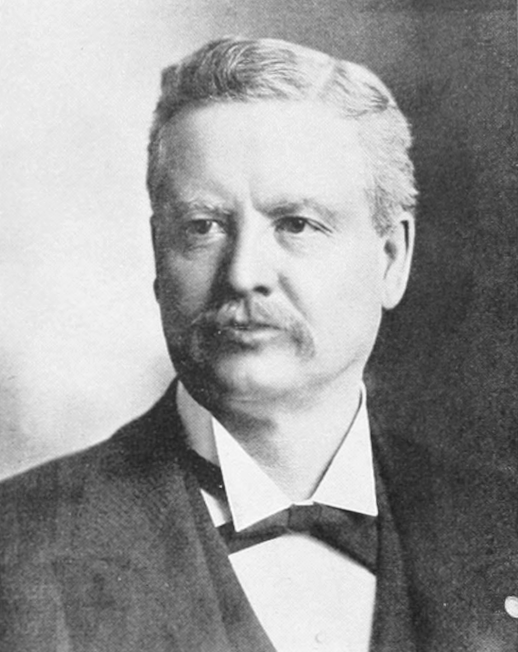
- Ames c. 1897

9th, 12th, 14th, & 20th Mayor of Minneapolis
- In office January 7, 1901 – August 27, 1902
- Preceded by: James Gray
- Succeeded by: David P. Jones
- In office April 13, 1886 – January 7, 1889
- Preceded by: George A. Pillsbury
- Succeeded by: Edward C. Babb
- In office April 11, 1882 – April 8, 1884
- Preceded by: Alonzo Cooper Rand
- Succeeded by: George A. Pillsbury
- In office April 11, 1876 – April 10, 1877
- Preceded by: Orlando C. Merriman
- Succeeded by: John De Laittre

Member of the Minnesota House of Representatives from the 5th district
- In office January 8, 1867 – January 6, 1868 Serving with Aaron Gould, John Seboski
- Preceded by: Aaron Gould; Jonas H. Howe
- Succeeded by: Charles Clark; Chester Davison; John Hechtman

Personal details
- Born: Albert Alonzo Ames; January 18, 1842 Garden Prairie, Illinois, U.S.
- Died: November 16, 1911 (aged 69) Minneapolis, Minnesota, U.S.
- Resting place: Lakewood Cemetery
- Party: Democratic (1876-1900); Republican (1875-1876, 1900–1911)
- Spouse(s): Sarah Strout (1862–1892); Harriet Symonds Pates (1892–1911)
- Children: 7
- Relatives: Alfred Elisha Ames (father)
- Education: Rush University (MD)

Military service
- Allegiance: United States • Union
- Branch/service: United States Army • Union Army
- Years of service: 1862–1865
- Rank: Surgeon Major
- Unit: 9th Minnesota Regiment; 7th Minnesota Regiment
- Battles/wars: Dakota War of 1862; American Civil War

Albert Alonzo "Doc" Ames (January 18, 1842 – November 16, 1911) was an American physician and politician who held four non-consecutive terms as mayor of Minneapolis, Minnesota. His fourth term was marked by multiple prosecutions for political corruption, extortion, and racketeering in a scandal which was publicized nationwide by muckraking journalist Lincoln Steffens in a 1903 article in McClure's Magazine titled The Shame of Minneapolis. Ames was found guilty of corruption, but after a successful appeal and multiple mistrials the charges were dropped. Erik Rivenes, however, has called the downfall of Mayor Ames, "one of the greatest political scandals in Minnesota history."

== Early life and military service ==
Ames was born in Garden Prairie, Illinois on January 18, 1842, to Dr. Alfred Elisha Ames and Martha A. Ames. In 1852, Ames' family relocated to near Fort Snelling in the Minnesota Territory. At this point the area was still largely undeveloped (they were only the seventh homestead claim made in Minneapolis). Ames attended local public schools which were partially run by the federal government. While attending high school in 1857, Ames became employed as a "printer's devil" and a newspaper carrier for the Northwestern Democrat (one of the first newspapers in Minneapolis). After graduating from high school in 1858, Ames pursued a career in medicine. Though he received much of his experience and training by observing and working with his father, he attended some classes at Rush Medical College in Chicago and received his M.D. on February 5, 1862.

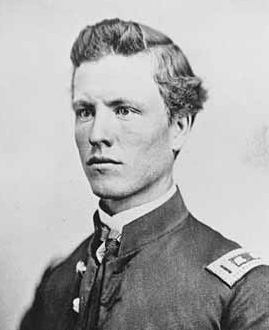
In Union Army uniform, c. 1862

After graduating with his M.D., Ames returned to Minneapolis intending to start his career as a doctor. After the outbreak of the American Civil War and tensions with the Dakota people began to flare up, Ames enlisted in the 9th Minnesota Volunteer Infantry Regiment as a private in August 1862. Two weeks later, Ames was transferred to the 7th Minnesota Volunteer Infantry Regiment and promoted to assistant surgeon. He served with the 7th Minnesota during the Dakota War of 1862 and was present at the execution by hanging of 38 Dakota warriors at Mankato on December 26, 1862.

Ames then served in several battles in the western theater of the Civil War. In July 1864, Ames replaced Lucius B. Smith as surgeon of the 7th Regiment, after the latter was killed in action during the Battle of Tupelo. He was promoted to the rank of surgeon major before mustering out of service in August 1865.

== Medical career ==
Following the war, Ames briefly returned to Minnesota to work in the medical field with his father. His popularity among Civil War veterans was such that he was elected to serve in the Minnesota House of Representatives in 1866 on a "soldiers' ticket." In 1868, he decided to move west to California. Once there, he joined the newspaper business, becoming managing editor of the Alta California. Ames remained in California until 1874, when he was summoned home due to his father's death.

Ames took over his father's medical practice in Minneapolis and developed a reputation as a kind and sympathetic figure. He was well known for treating the poor at no charge and for answering calls at any time of the day. He also served as a firefighter.

In 1886, when Minnesota's deadliest ever tornado devastated both St. Cloud and Sauk Rapids, "Doc Ames" arrived at the scene in order to treat the injured. This brought him to nationwide attention.

== Political rise ==
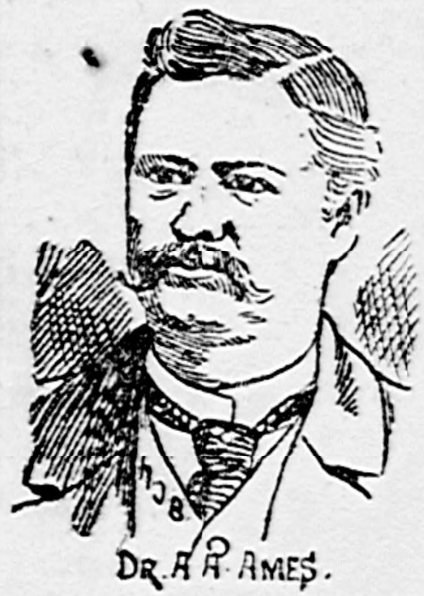
A.A. Ames Newspaper portrait in 1886

Ames became active in the city's Democratic party. He served on the Minneapolis City Council in 1875–1876 as a Republican. He ran for mayor in 1876, initially as a Republican but he switched to running as a Democrat after being defeated for the Republican nomination. He was elected in 1876 but was defeated for reelection in 1877. He was named the city's health officer in 1878. He was subsequently elected the city's mayor in 1882 and 1886 as a Democrat. His first term was described as "an indifferent success", but his second and third terms generated accusations of corruption.

Ames was not as successful with his attempts at higher office. During this era, the Republican Party dominated Minnesota, and thus, Ames faced difficult odds for most state offices. In 1877, he ran unsuccessfully as lieutenant governor. In 1886, he ran for governor but narrowly lost to Andrew Ryan McGill following one of the most contentious and chaotic state conventions in the history of the state. The narrow margin of victory sparked controversy over who was the actual winner, and the election was contested until Ames decided the effort was not worth the time. He also ran unsuccessfully for a seat in the United States House of Representatives and, at one time, had been under consideration as a candidate for the vice presidency.

Ames was instrumental in the creation of a veteran's home in Minneapolis. He initially promoted the idea at the state's Democratic convention in 1886. Despite losing the election, the Republican administration accepted his suggestions and authorized the construction of the Minnesota Veterans Home. Ames later served there as a surgeon.

After being defeated in an election for park board in 1888, Ames took a long trip to Europe. Upon returning home, Ames gave an anti-Irish and anti-Catholic interview that outraged Minnesota's large Irish-American population and made Ames multiple lifelong enemies. When asked for his "views about Ireland", Ames replied, "Well, they have changed. When I left I was prejudiced in favor of Home Rule, but now I do not think the people of Ireland are capable of ruling themselves... I have had plenty of opportunity of studying the Irish question, and I am convinced of one thing, that Ireland is priest-ridden... They are bowed down by superstition and ignorance, and this is to be found wherever the priests are. The priest power of Ireland does not want the people to be educated."

After Ames' comments resulted in a firestorm of outraged denunciations by Irish-Americans who had formerly supported him, the Genial Doctor claimed to have received five death threats in letters which promised Ames the same treatment given to Dr. Patrick Henry Cronin. The letters came, Ames alleged, from Roger Vail, the editor of the Minneapolis-based Irish Standard newspaper, on behalf of the Irish republican Clan na Gael organization. In response, the Doctor made a lifelong enemy out of Vail, whose Irish Standard responded by reprinting editorials from Ames' many critics among the Minnesota press, who argued that the letters were almost certainly manufactured, "by Ames & Co."

After losing an independent campaign for mayor in 1898, Ames devised a new strategy. In the 1900 primary election for mayor, he exploited a newly adopted rule that changed the city's primary elections to an open primary (allowing voters to vote for candidates in either party). He campaigned for votes as a Republican (knowing the competition was limited) and narrowly won the nomination. He went on to win the general election in 1900. Between his underhanded election strategy and accusations of corruption in his prior administrations, Ames was described as "damned politically, socially and professionally" when he entered office in 1901.

== "The Shame of Minneapolis" ==
After entering office, Ames consolidated his power over the city's police department (the one area of city government over which the mayor had full control). He fired nearly half of the city's officers and replaced them with his political allies, henchmen, and criminals who purchased their badges. As police chief, Ames appointed his brother Colonel Frederick W. Ames, who, despite being "a weak, vacillating individual," had recently commanded an entire regiment of Minnesota soldiers during the Philippine–American War. Norman W. King, a gambler and underworld figure, became the city's chief of detectives. Medical student and confidant Irwin A. Gardner was made a special policeman, worked as the Mayor's bagman, and was also put in charge of the city's vice squad.

Mayor Ames and the Minneapolis police began operating as an organized crime syndicate, extorting protection money and various "fines" from the city's illegal businesses. The money collected was turned over to Ames, and only small fees were given to his associates. Minneapolis was promoted as an "open city" to criminals across the country, and criminals were released from the city's jail. Illegal businesses such as opium joints, gambling parlors, and houses of prostitution blossomed, many in the Gateway district. It was speculated that women were setting up candy stores to run a legitimate business to children and workers out front, but providing the services of prostitutes in the back.

After a year in office, Ames' organization began to swirl out of control. Ames was drinking heavily and the various police and politicians under him began to fight among themselves, withholding money from Ames or developing their own extortion schemes without his approval. Attempts by the Hennepin County sheriff to crack down on the widespread criminal activities were quashed, but even average citizens were aware of the city's descent into corruption.

== Prosecution ==
In April 1902, a grand jury under the leadership of foreman Hovey C. Clarke began an investigation into the Minneapolis city government and its officials. Clarke was a respected and successful citizen who singlehandedly took on the case, dismissing the county's prosecutor when he was unwilling to attack Ames. Clarke paid private detectives, both locally known men and others from out of town, to investigate. After obtaining enough evidence to indict two of Ames' henchmen, they were convinced to turn state's evidence and provide information on others in the organization. By June 1902, indictments had been made against Fred Ames, Gardner and others. Before he too was convicted, Ames fled the city after announcing he had been hired as the medical superintendent of the West Baden Springs Hotel. He attempted to stay in power from Indiana, but finally announced his resignation as mayor effective September 6, 1902.

As his former allies were tried and indicted, Ames remained on the run. In February 1903, he was arrested at the house of Episcopalian clergyman Rev. C. H. Chapin in Hancock, New Hampshire. Despite a "strong fight on the part of the fugitive," Ames was extradited to Minnesota and put on trial for receiving a bribe of six hundred dollars from a prostitute. Based on the testimony of his co-conspirators, including his bagman Irwin A. Gardner, Ames was found guilty and sentenced to six years in the Minnesota State Prison at Stillwater. The sentence was overturned on appeal and, after two additional trials ended as mistrials, all legal action against him was ceased.

== Personal life ==
In April 1862, Ames married Sarah Strout, the daughter of Captain Richard Strout, who had helped to raise the 9th and 10th Minnesota Infantry Regiments. Emery Washington, a family friend, later recalled, "Richard Strout's family consisted of his wife and one daughter, the latter a handsome girl. I remember as well as though it were yesterday the day she was married to Dr. A. A. Ames. I was at the house when they returned from church, and I remarked to Capt. Strout that I had never seen a finer looking couple... A few weeks after the wedding Dr. Ames went to war with his company."

== Later life ==
After the end of the final trial, Ames returned to Minneapolis to practice medicine. He died quite suddenly during the night on November 16, 1911. His obituary in the Minneapolis Morning Tribune described Ames as a 33rd degree Scottish Rite Freemason, and a Knight Templar. He was also a member of the Knights of Pythias. After a service inside his home by a Unitarian minister, his body was cremated in Minneapolis's Lakewood Cemetery. He left his widow a sum of $1,410.94 and a sum of $1 to each of his surviving children.

== Legacy ==
In his memoir Augie's Secrets, Twin Cities journalist Neal Karlen concedes that the power temporarily wielded in Minneapolis by Jewish-American organized crime figures like Kid Cann and David Berman beginning in the Prohibition-era gave a major boost to local anti-Semitism, for which Minneapolis became infamous nationwide. Karlen further argues, however, that the pervasive criminality during Mayor Ames' last term demonstrates that the city of Minneapolis was even more corrupt when Scandinavians and White Anglo-Saxon Protestants were still running it.

Political offices
Preceded by Orlando C. Merriman	Mayor of Minneapolis; 1876–1877	Succeeded by John De Laittre
Preceded by Alonzo Cooper Rand	Mayor of Minneapolis; 1882–1884	Succeeded by George A. Pillsbury
Preceded by George A. Pillsbury	Mayor of Minneapolis; 1886–1889	Succeeded by Edward C. Babb
Preceded by James Gray	Mayor of Minneapolis; 1901–1902	Succeeded by David P. Jones
Party political offices
Preceded by Adolph Biermann	Democratic nominee for Governor of Minnesota; 1886	Succeeded by Eugene McLanahan Wilson
