= 1886 Minnesota gubernatorial election =

- November 2, 1886
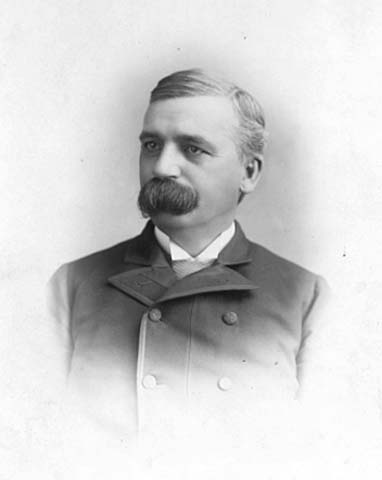

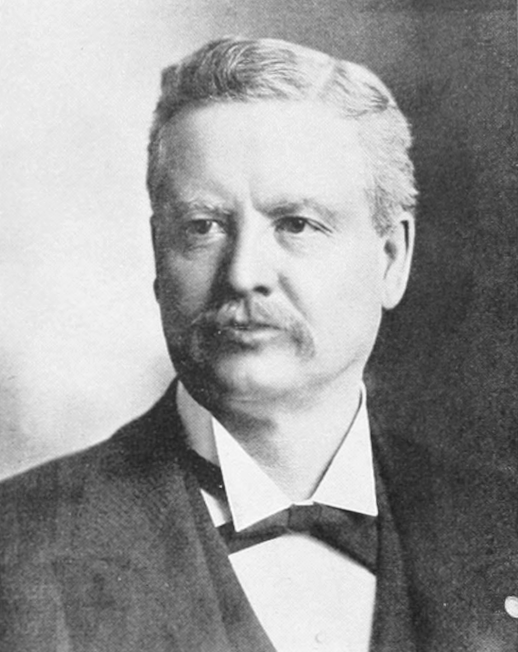
| Nominee | Andrew Ryan McGill | A. A. Ames |
| Party | Republican | Democratic |
| Popular vote | 107,064 | 104,464 |
| Percentage | 48.55% | 47.37% |
- County results McGill: 40−50% 50−60% 60−70% 70−80% 80−90% Ames: 40−50% 50−60% 60−70% 70−80% 80−90% Unknown/no vote
Governor before election
Lucius Frederick Hubbard
Republican
Elected Governor
Andrew Ryan McGill
Republican

The 1886 Minnesota gubernatorial election was held on November 2, 1886, to elect the governor of Minnesota. Incumbent Lucius Frederick Hubbard did not seek a third term. This was the first gubernatorial election held in Minnesota in an even-numbered year.

== Candidates ==
- Albert Alonzo Ames (A.A. Ames), mayor of Minneapolis (Democrat)
- James E. Child, former state senator (Prohibition)
- Andrew Ryan McGill, state insurance commissioner (Republican)

== Campaigns ==
=== Republican State Convention ===
The Republican State Convention was held on September 22, 1886. Five candidates contested in the primary: McGill, Charles A. Gilman, John L. Gibbs, Albert Scheffer, and Theodore H. Barrett. Barrett dropped out after the first informal ballot. For the fourth ballot, the supporters of Gilman and Gibbs began to rally around Sheffer in an effort to defeat McGill. However, not enough Gibbs and Gilman voters switched to Sheffer in the ballot, and instead split the vote, resulting in a McGill victory in the primary.

=== Democratic State Convention ===
The Democratic State Convention was held on September 23, 1886. Prior to the convention even beginning, there were great political dealings regarding A. A. Ames. Ames was the only major Democratic candidate; however, to win the nomination he was expected to agree to reform some of his positions to appease assumed to-be convention leaders and major party bosses Michael Doran and Patrick H. Kelly. Mainly, this included Ames allowing them to re-organize the state Democratic party to their wishes. If Ames failed to fall in line, Doran was expected to run against him in the primary. Kelly soon became a strong supporter of Ames. Ames then collaborated with Kelly and Ignatius Donnelly to agree to support his campaign, on the condition that Ames could select a new central committee for the party, which really meant the ability to remove Doran from party leadership. The deal was successful.

On the convention day itself, Donnelly and Ames made their platform, endorsed by the Farmer's Alliance and Knights of Labor, the official platform of the State Democratic Party. Further controversy occurred when the nomination of Ames was presented as a motion of the convention, instead of a primary. This was hotly debated, with delegate G.A. Lafayette expressing the opinion that "If the convention was sensible, it would not indorse anybody for governor." What followed were further arguments, and even an accusation of bribery, between delegates. The arguments became unruly enough that Donnelly amended the motion to state that the party "endorses nobody". However, after only a few minutes, some men called for a motion to re-endorse Ames. Ames remarked that he was now powerless over the convention. After Ames was nominated, and amid rising arguments and increasingly large claims of corruption from many sides, Donnelly announced his intention to kick delegates from the Farmer's Alliance out of the convention and repeal all motions they had proposed. The convention began chanting, "NO! NO!" The motion was passed. Following the chaotic convention, Donnelly was removed from his position and Doran re-took his position as chairman of the party.

The narrow margin of victory sparked controversy over who was the actual winner, and the election was contested until Ames decided the effort was not worth the time and conceded.

== Results ==
Minnesota gubernatorial election, 1886
| Party | Candidate | Votes | % |
|---|---|---|---|
| Republican | Andrew Ryan McGill | 107,064 | 48.55 |
| Democratic | A. A. Ames | 104,464 | 47.37 |
| Prohibition | James E. Child | 8,966 | 4.07 |
| | Write-In | 37 | 0.02 |
| Total votes | | 220,531 | 100 |
| Republican hold | | | |
