= Garden Prairie =

Garden Prairie can mean:

- Garden Prairie, Illinois - a village in the United States
- An alternate name for a prairie garden
