= Alonzo Cooper Rand =

American inventor and politician

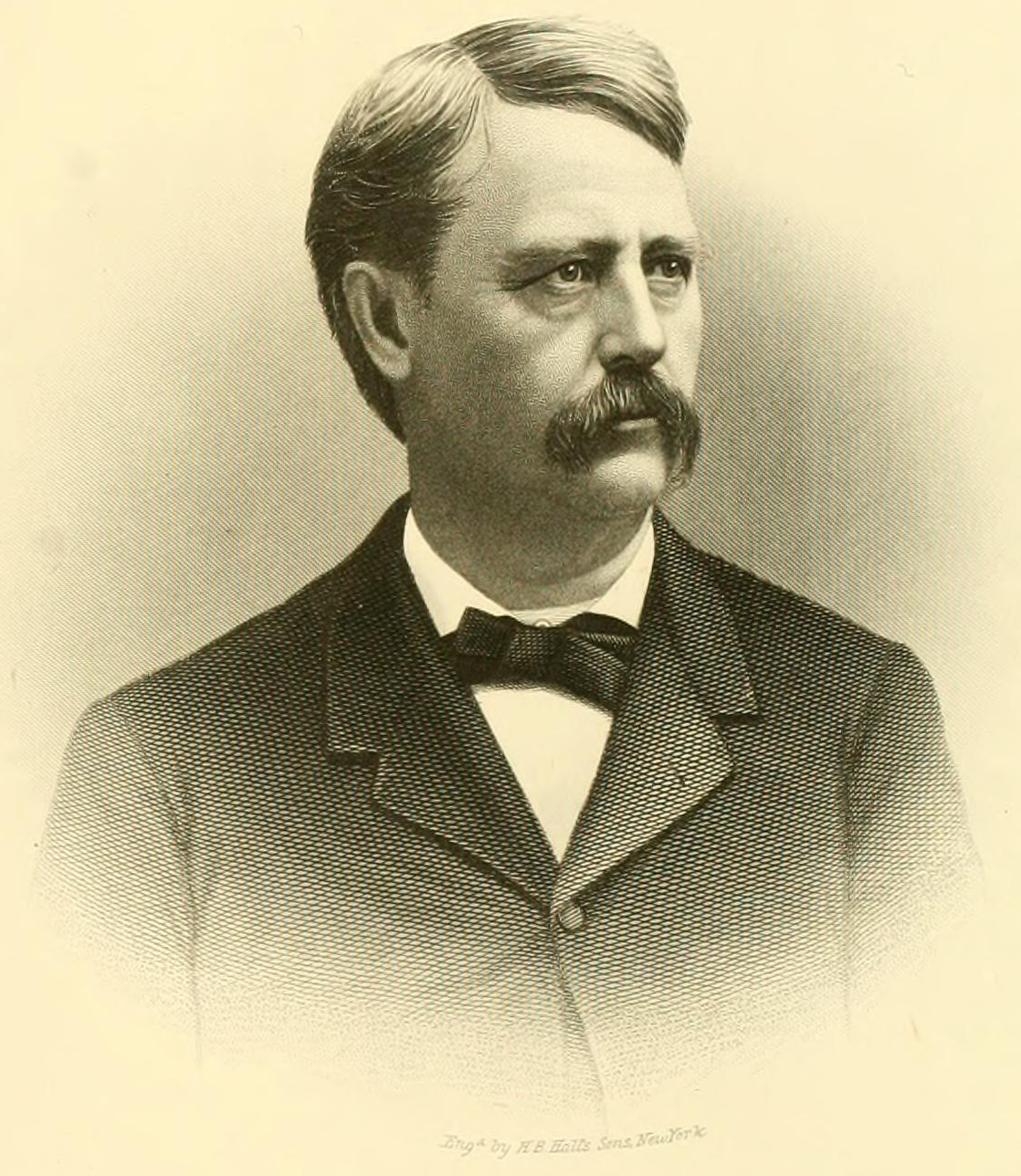
- Rand c. 1890

11th Mayor of Minneapolis
- In office April 9, 1878 – April 11, 1882
- Preceded by: John De Laittre
- Succeeded by: A. A. Ames

Personal details
- Born: December 31, 1831 Boston, Massachusetts, U.S.
- Died: July 12, 1885 (aged 53) Lake Minnetonka, Minnesota, U.S.
- Resting place: Lakewood Cemetery
- Party: Republican
- Spouse: Celine M. Johnson
- Occupation: Petroleum industry

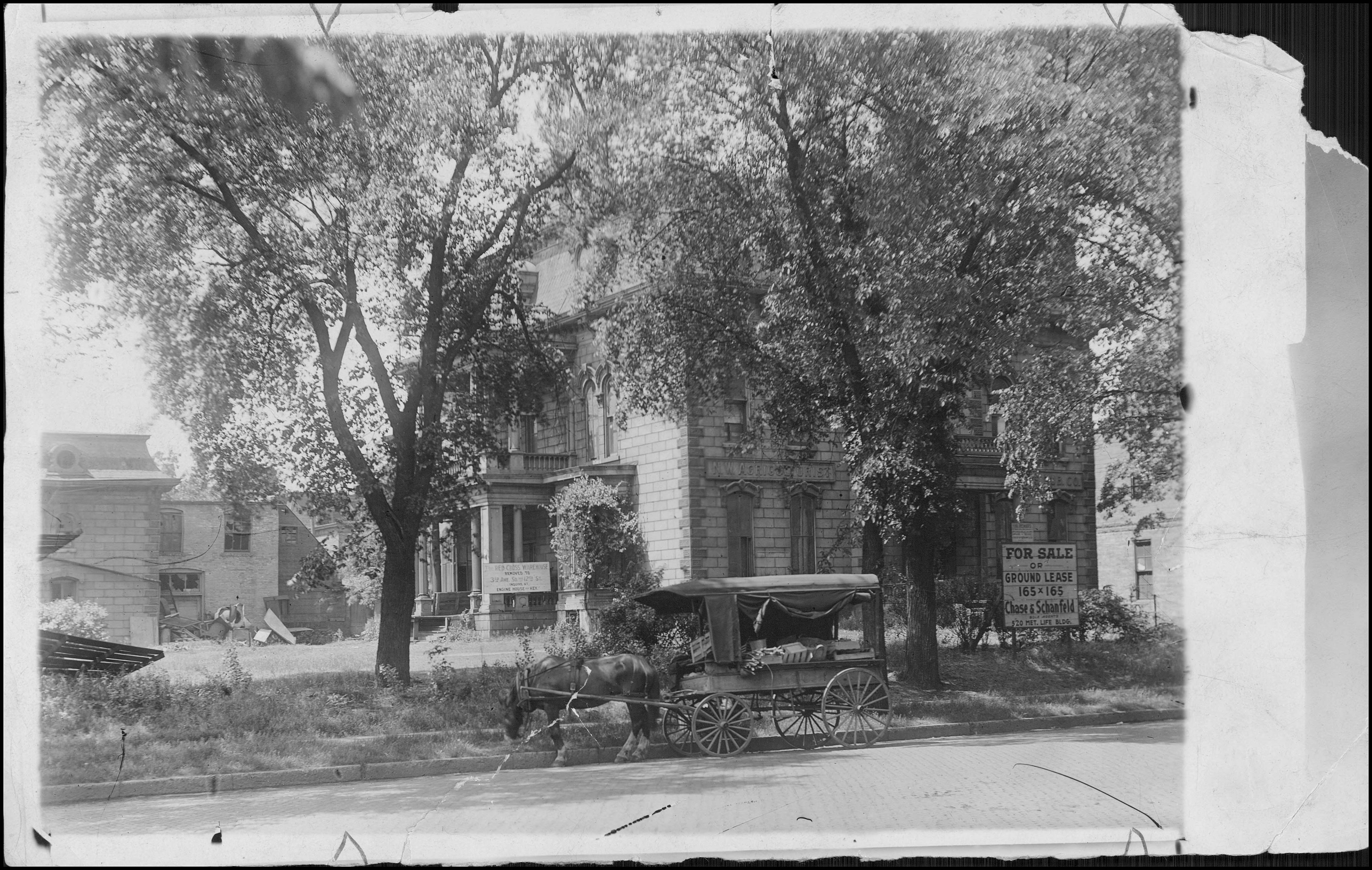
Former house of Rand, Minneapolis

Alonzo Cooper Rand (December 31, 1831 – July 12, 1885) was an innovator in the petroleum industry and the 11th mayor of Minneapolis, Minnesota.

== Life and career ==
Rand was born in Boston, Massachusetts in 1831 to Charles T. Rand and Deborah F. Rand (née Sprague). As a child he moved to Buffalo, New York where he attended school before going to college at the nearby Gowanda Institute. In September 1853 he married Celine M. Johnson. Rand soon became involved in the oil industry, patenting a unique process for oil refining. He moved around New England and later to Aurora, Illinois perfecting his technique and eventually becoming quite wealthy from it.

In 1874 Rand visited Minneapolis and decided to move there, arriving two years later. With his background he soon became involved in the Minneapolis Gas Light Company (forerunner of Minnegasco, now CenterPoint Energy). Despite being a fairly new resident he was elected mayor in 1878 and would serve two terms. One account noted his term was "a model administration" which provided for the city's growth and better law enforcement. Another suggests that he was elected in absentia and that "he...makes a splendid officer, but thinks it was rather cruel on the part of his friends to drag him from retirement and place him in the mayor's chair, with all its perplexing duties."

On July 12, 1885, Rand was killed along with his wife and several of his children when their boat capsized during a sudden storm on Lake Minnetonka. He was buried in Lakewood Cemetery.

== Electoral history ==
- Minneapolis Mayoral Election, 1878
  - Alonzo Cooper Rand 2,862
  - Michael W. Glenn 2,506
  - Albert Lawrence 192
- Minneapolis Mayoral Election, 1880
  - Alonzo Cooper Rand 3,039
  - Edwin Phillips 1,690

Political offices
Preceded by John De Laittre	Mayor of Minneapolis; 1878 – 1882	Succeeded by A. A. Ames
