= Charles Alfred Pillsbury =

American industrialist (1842–1899)

- Born: December 3, 1842; Warner, New Hampshire, U.S.
- Died: September 17, 1899 (aged 56); Minneapolis, Minnesota, U.S.
- Resting place: Lakewood Cemetery
- Education: Dartmouth College, 1863
- Spouse: Mary Ann Stinson (m. 1866)
- Children: 4
- Father: George A. Pillsbury
- Relatives: Winston Lord (great-grandson)

Signature
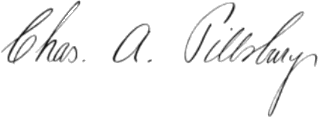

Charles Alfred Pillsbury (December 3, 1842 – September 17, 1899) was an American businessman, flour industrialist, and politician. He was a co-founder of the Pillsbury Company.

== Early life ==
Pillsbury was born December 3, 1842, in Warner, New Hampshire, first of three children born to George Alfred Pillsbury and Margaret Sprague Carleton. His sister Mary A. died in infancy. His brother Frederick Carleton Pillsbury was born in 1852. Pillsbury had a modest upbringing. He graduated from Dartmouth College in 1863, paying for his college education by teaching part-time.

== Career ==
Pillsbury worked for six years as a clerk and partner in Montreal, Quebec, Canada at a mercantile enterprise. He was drawn to business in Minneapolis after experiencing and observing the commercial interests in Montreal, which processed grain from the west. Pillsbury's uncle, John S. Pillsbury, had settled at the Falls of St. Anthony at Minneapolis in 1855; in 1869, Charles Pillsbury moved to the growing city of Minneapolis and established his flour business.

At the time of Pillsbury's arrival, four or five flour mills, deriving their power from the Falls, were small in size and ground their grain with large buhr stones. Pillsbury was employed by his uncle and soon gained part-ownership in his own mill. Pillsbury made a close and thorough study of the methods of flour milling and contemplated better results through the industry's innovative practices in flour processing. At his own mill, Pillsbury discarded the buhr stones, and introduced and improved on the newer practices. He competed with milling concerns owned by Cadwallader C. Washburn, George Henry Christian and his brothers, and other millers in the production of what was called "new process" flour.

Pillsbury created the brand "Pillsbury's Best." It was claimed that "Pillsbury's Best" was the finest flour in the world, and its production techniques allowed Pillsbury to capture the market demanding high-quality flour. The use of a series of carefully gauged steel rolls milling grain into flour effected a revolution in the large flour mills in the US, as it was efficient and produced excellent quality. It led to important changes in wheat growing, because it created a demand for hard "spring wheat", which had been, up to that point, less desirable than the softer winter wheat of the South.

In 1872, Pillsbury persuaded his father and his uncle to join him in an expansion of the business and the firm of Charles A. Pillsbury & Co. entered upon a career of remarkable enterprise. A brother, Frederick C. Pillsbury, came into the firm at a later date. The company's history in flour milling became synonymous with the history of the industry. Minneapolis became one of the largest markets for grain in the world. The care, thoroughness and soundness of Pillsbury's business practices gave the Pillsbury mill a foremost position in flour manufacturing in the United States. Later, four new mills were added to the original plant, either by purchase or lease, including the Pillsbury "B", Empire, Excelsior and Anchor mills, and each of the new properties was rebuilt and equipped with the most modern equipment.

To ensure an ample supply of the finest wheat, the firm brought into being the Millers' Association, whose agents inspected and purchased only the finest grain in the Northwest. A system of grain elevators for storage and shipment was created, under the ownership of the Minneapolis & Northern Elevator Co., of which Pillsbury was president. The warehouses and elevators of this firm are still extant near the Mississippi riverfront in Minneapolis.

The final step in the extension of the business of the firm was the construction of the huge Pillsbury "A" Mill. In preparation for this expansion, Pillsbury had observed flour mills in Europe, including those of Budapest, Hungary, which had the reputation of production of the finest flour in the "old world". The Pillsbury "A" Mill, built in 1882, was the pride of the firm, with a capacity of 5,000 barrels of flour a day, later increased to 10,000 barrels. Production later increased to 24,500 barrels of flour a day, and the brand became known worldwide.

Pillsbury also introduced a system of company profit sharing, paying as much as $25,000 per year in bonuses to workers depending on the company's success. As a result, no strikes ever interrupted the Pillsbury business.

== Political career ==
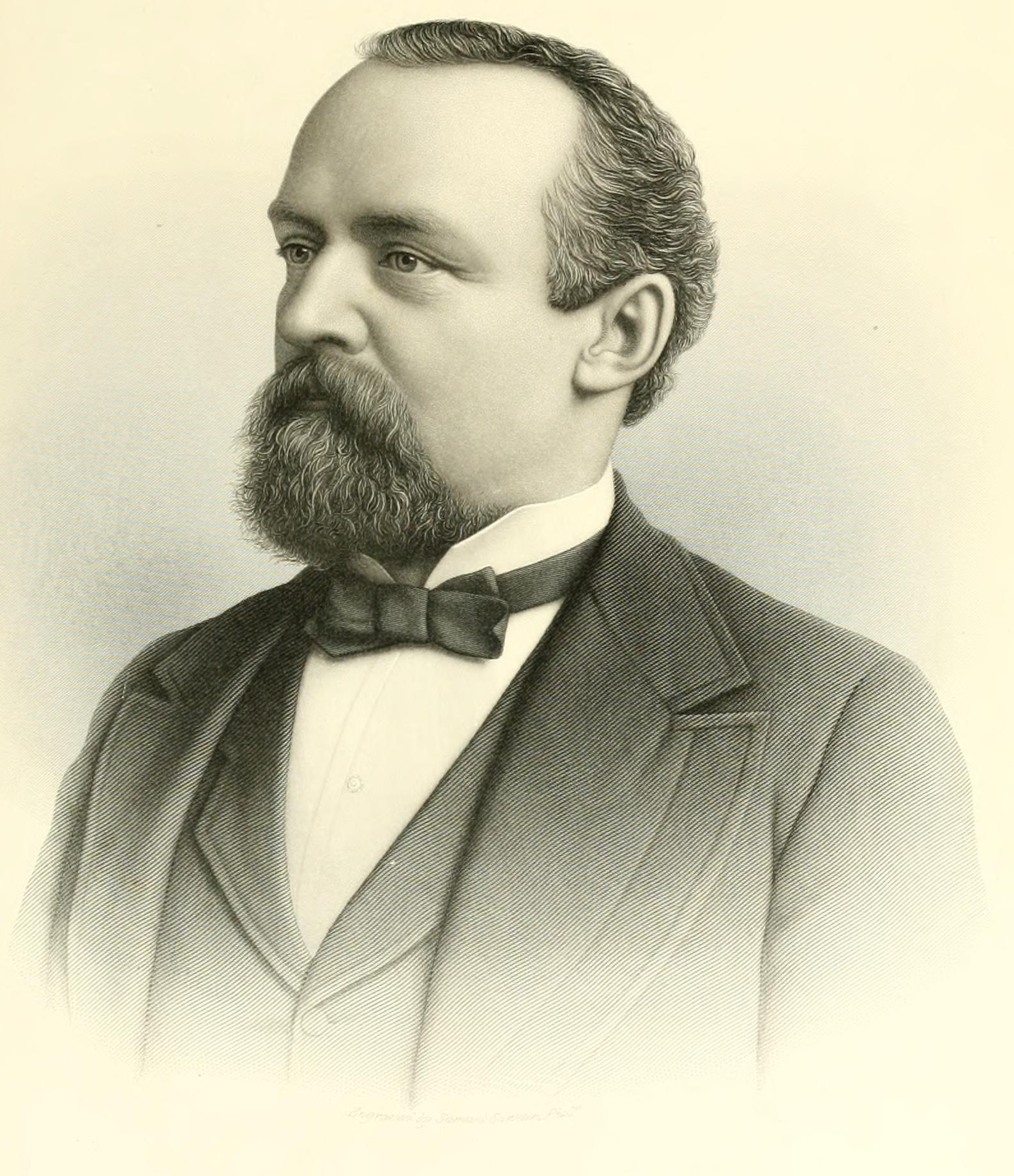
Pillsbury in 1893

From 1878 to 1886, Pillsbury was a member of the Minnesota Senate. For the majority of that time he held the chairmanship of the Finance Committee of the Senate. He was responsible for introduction and implementation of legislation recommended by his uncle, Governor John S. Pillsbury, regarding the state's bonds. He declined other offers at political office including a nomination for mayor of Minneapolis out of concern for his business interests. He had agreed to serve as a state senator knowing that the legislative session was brief and fell over winter.

== Pillsbury sale ==
In 1889, an English syndicate bought a controlling interest in the largest flour companies and mills in Minneapolis. The different business were combined under the name of The Pillsbury-Washburn Flour Mills Co. Pillsbury remained the manager and one of the three American directors of the company overseeing operations and not looking out for the company's assets.

== Personal life ==
Pillsbury married Mary Ann Stinson, daughter of Capt. Charles Stinson and his wife Mary Ann Poore, on September 12, 1866. The two had four children. The two first-born children, George Alfred (1871–1872) and Margaret Carleton (1876–1881), both died in childhood. On December 6, 1878, twin sons Charles Stinson and John Sargent were born, and both of them lived into adulthood. Charles married Nelle Pendleton Winston in 1901, while John married Eleanor Jerusha Lawler in 1911.

Pillsbury died suddenly on September 17, 1899, from a heart ailment. He was buried in Lakewood Cemetery.
