= Theodore H. Barrett =

Union army general

Theodore Harvey Barrett
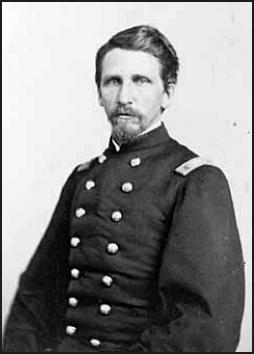
- Born: August 27, 1834; Orangeville, New York, United States
- Died: July 20, 1900 (aged 65); Herman, Minnesota, United States
- Burial place: Riverside Cemetery, Sterling, Illinois, United States
- Military career
- Allegiance: United States (Union)
- Branch: United States Army (Union Army)
- Service years: 1862 – 1866
- Rank: Bvt. Brigadier General
- Unit: 9th Minnesota Infantry Regiment
- Commands: 1st Missouri Colored Infantry Regiment
- Conflicts: American Civil War; Expedition from Brazos Santiago; Battle of Palmito Ranch

Theodore Harvey Barrett (1834–1900) was an American Brevet Brigadier General who commanded the 1st Missouri Colored Infantry Regiment in the later years of the American Civil War and was known as the commander of the Battle of Palmito Ranch which was the final battle of the war.

== Biography ==
Theodore was born on August 27, 1834. Barrett enlisted on September 15, 1862, as a 2nd Lieutenant of the 9th Minnesota Infantry Regiment at Company G but wouldn't see active service as the 9th Minnesota was organized to engage in skirmish with Native American tribes. On December 29, 1863, he was transferred to the 1st Missouri Colored Infantry Regiment where he became a Colonel of the regiment which served in the Department of the Gulf in Louisiana until June 1864. Afterwards, the Regiment was ordered to head for Texas. Barrett was brevetted Brigadier General on March 13, 1865, for "faithful and meritorious services".

He then organized an unofficial truce with the Confederates there around March until Barrett dispatched the 1st Missouri, the 34th Indiana and the 2nd Texas to raid a Confederate camp near Fort Brown but were driven back after some Mexican witnesses reported them to the Confederates due to a few skirmishes between them and the Union forces. On the next day, John "Rip" Ford engaged in a battle with Barrett at the Battle of Palmito Ranch and despite the Confederate victory at the battle, it was all in vain as Ford's forces would surrender 2 weeks later. Barrett was then discharged on January 19, 1866, and returned to Herman, Minnesota. In 1886, he ran for the Republican nomination for governor of Minnesota. He dropped out after the first informal ballot. Barret died at home on July 20, 1900, and was buried at Riverside Cemetery, Sterling, Illinois.

=== Legacy ===
Barrett, Minnesota is named after Barrett after its establishment in 1887.

=== Family ===
Theodore H. Barrett married Georgia McKee in 1879 and built a home in Stevens County, Minnesota. They had three children: Theodore, Richardson, and Georgiana.

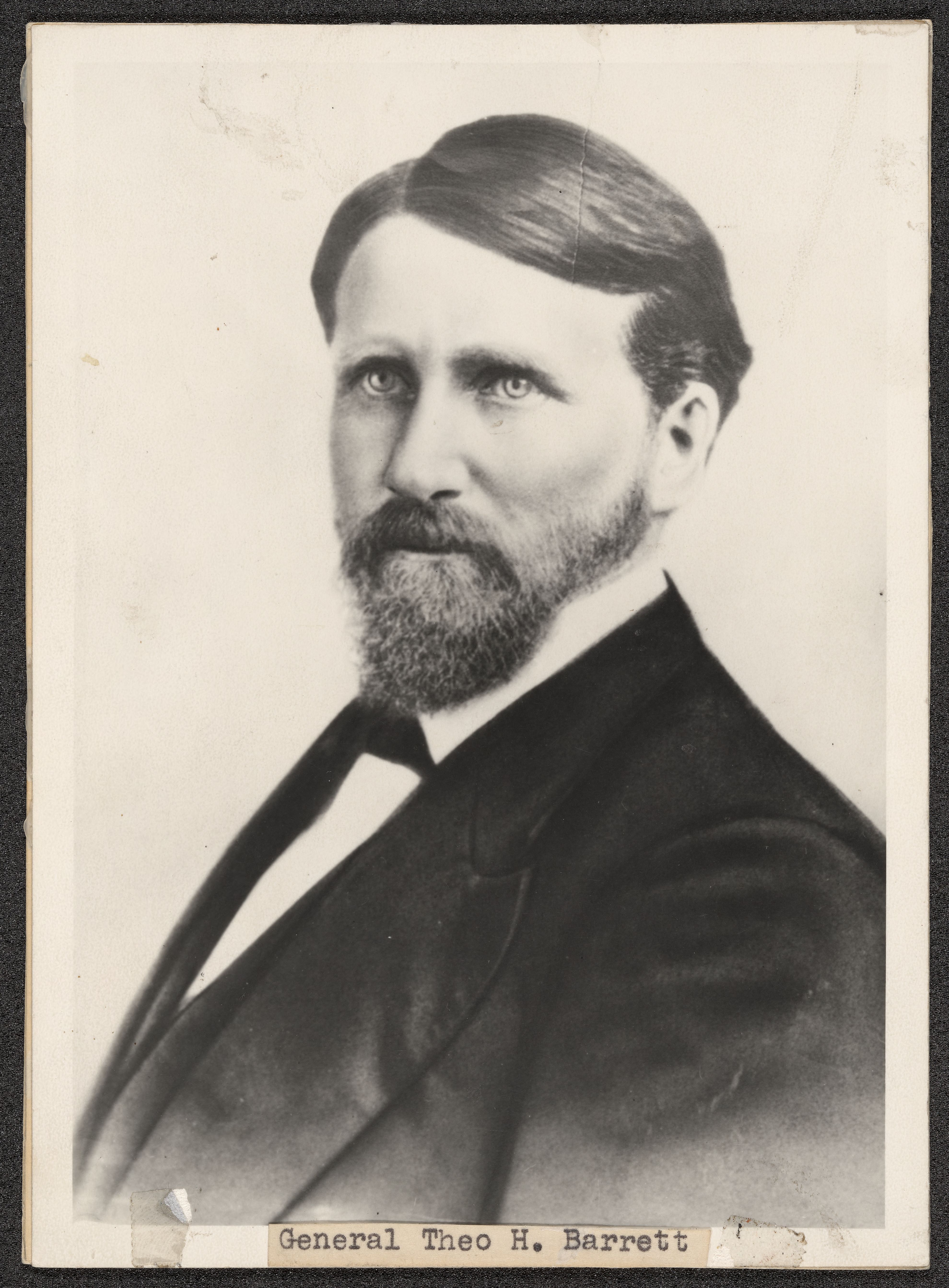
Theodore H. Barrett, c. 1880-1890. Grant County Historical Society collection.

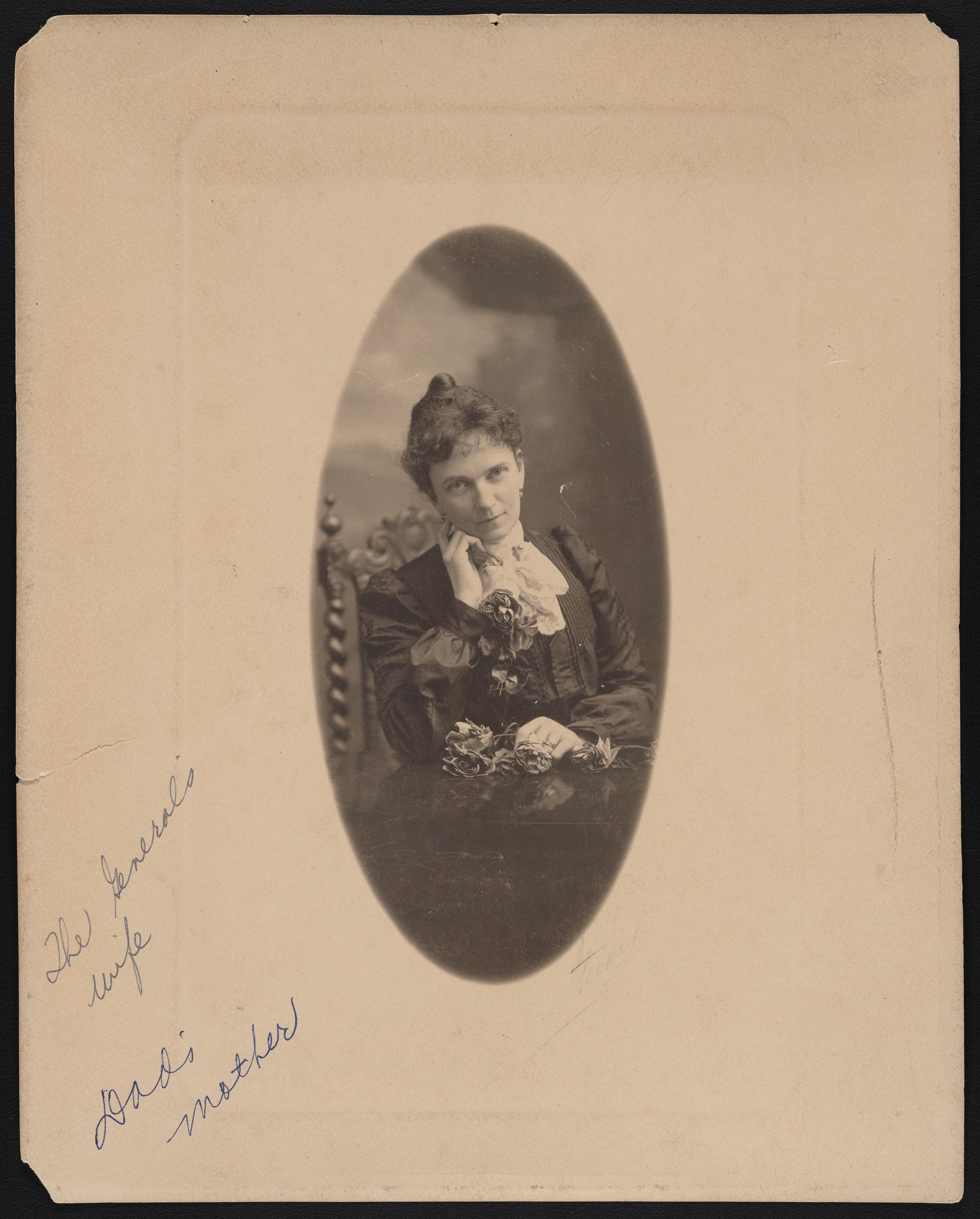
Georgia (McKee) Barrett, wife of Theodore Barrett, c. 1880-1900.

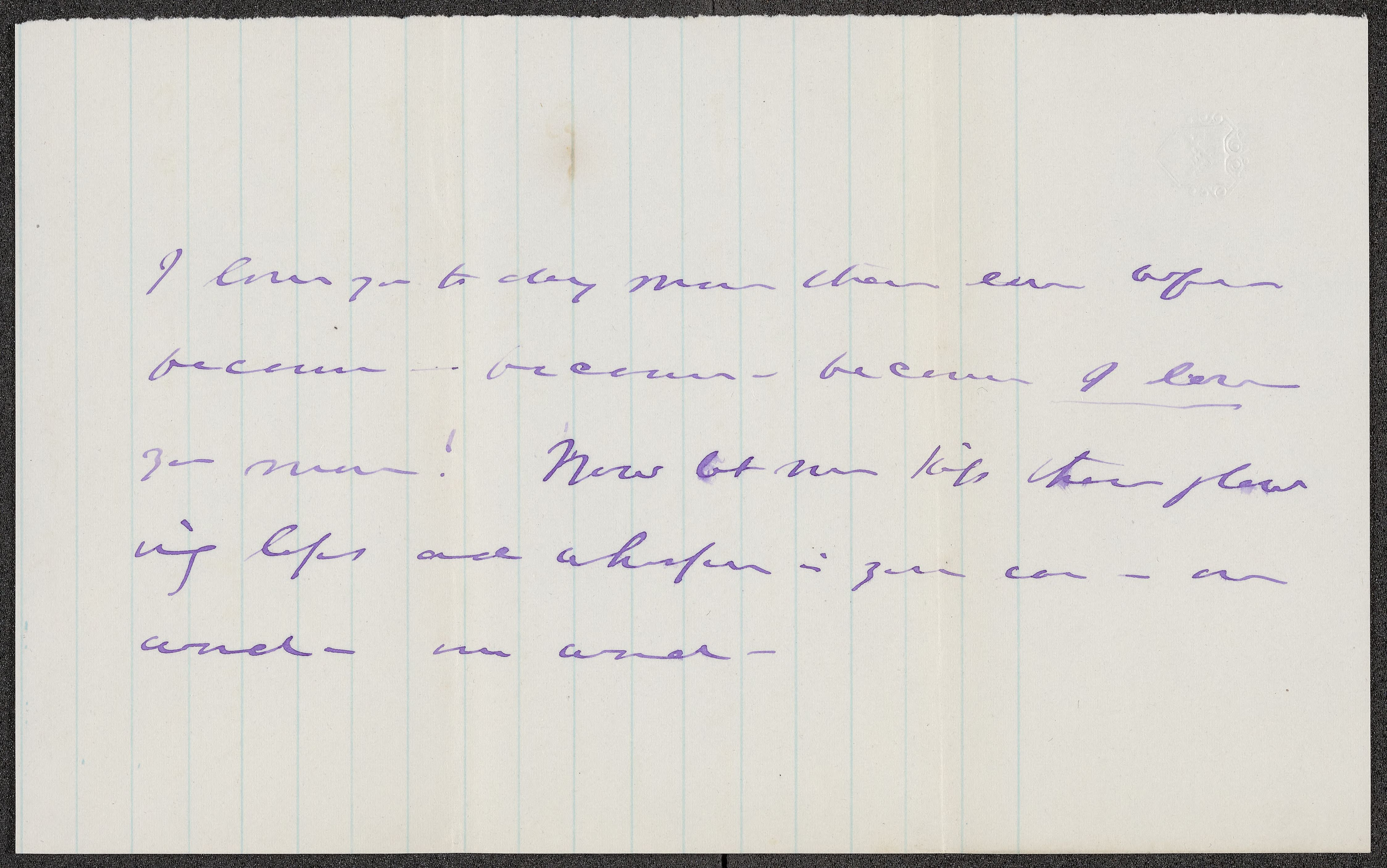
Love letter from Theodore Barrett to Georgia McKee dated April 16, 1879

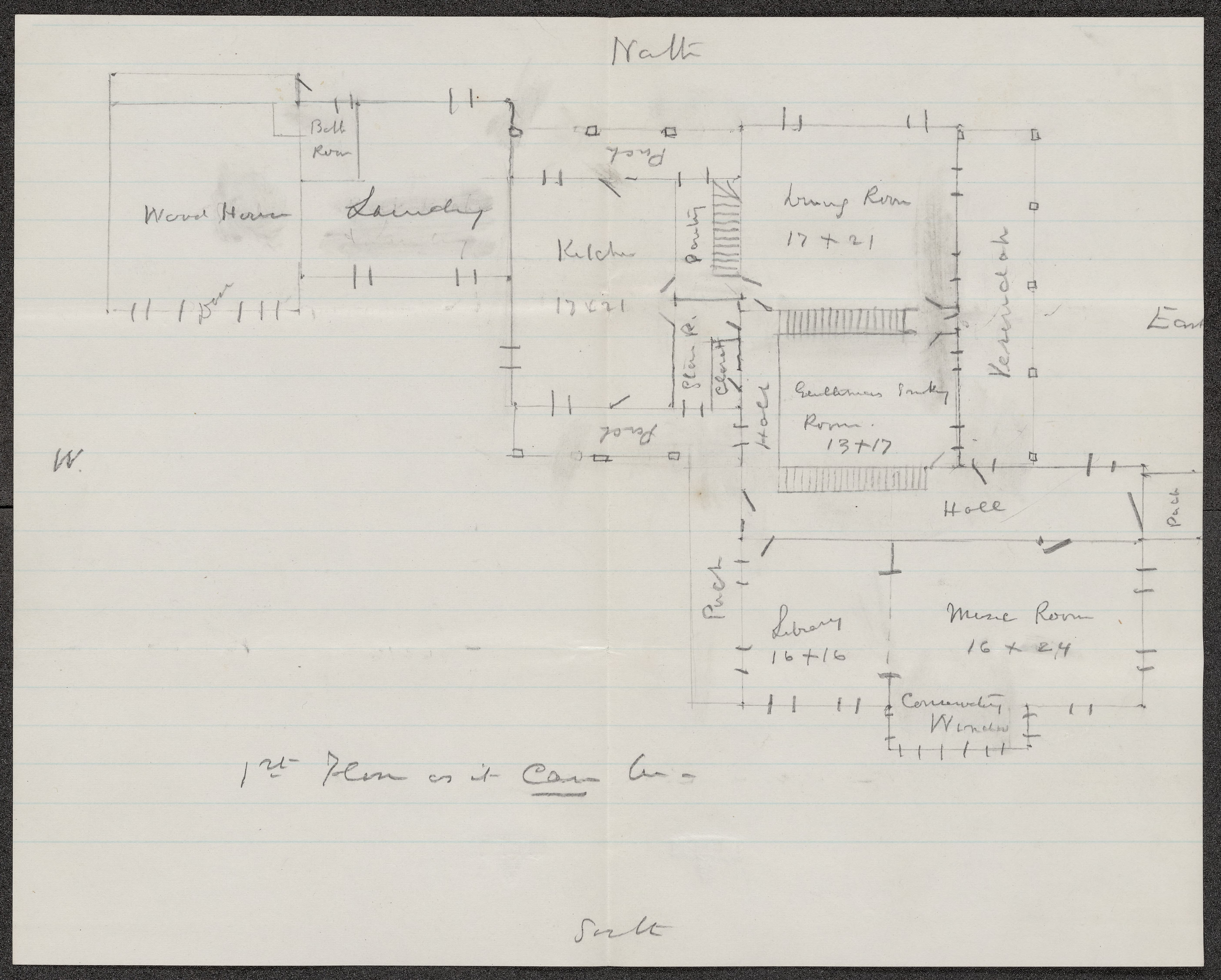
Sketch of the house Theodore Barrett was building for himself and Georgia in a letter dated December 23, 1878.

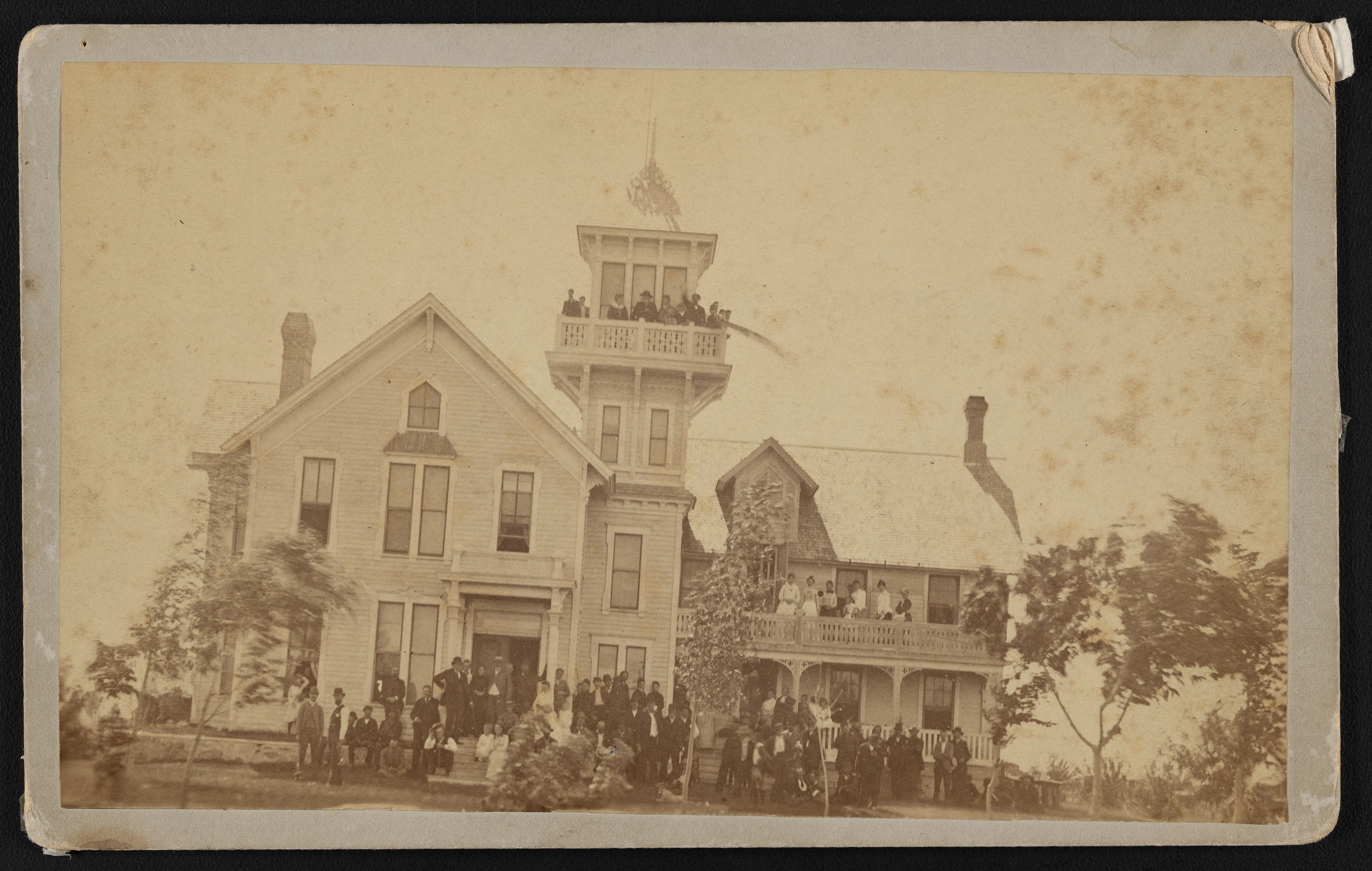
Theodore H. Barrett's house in Stevens County, Minnesota, 1890.

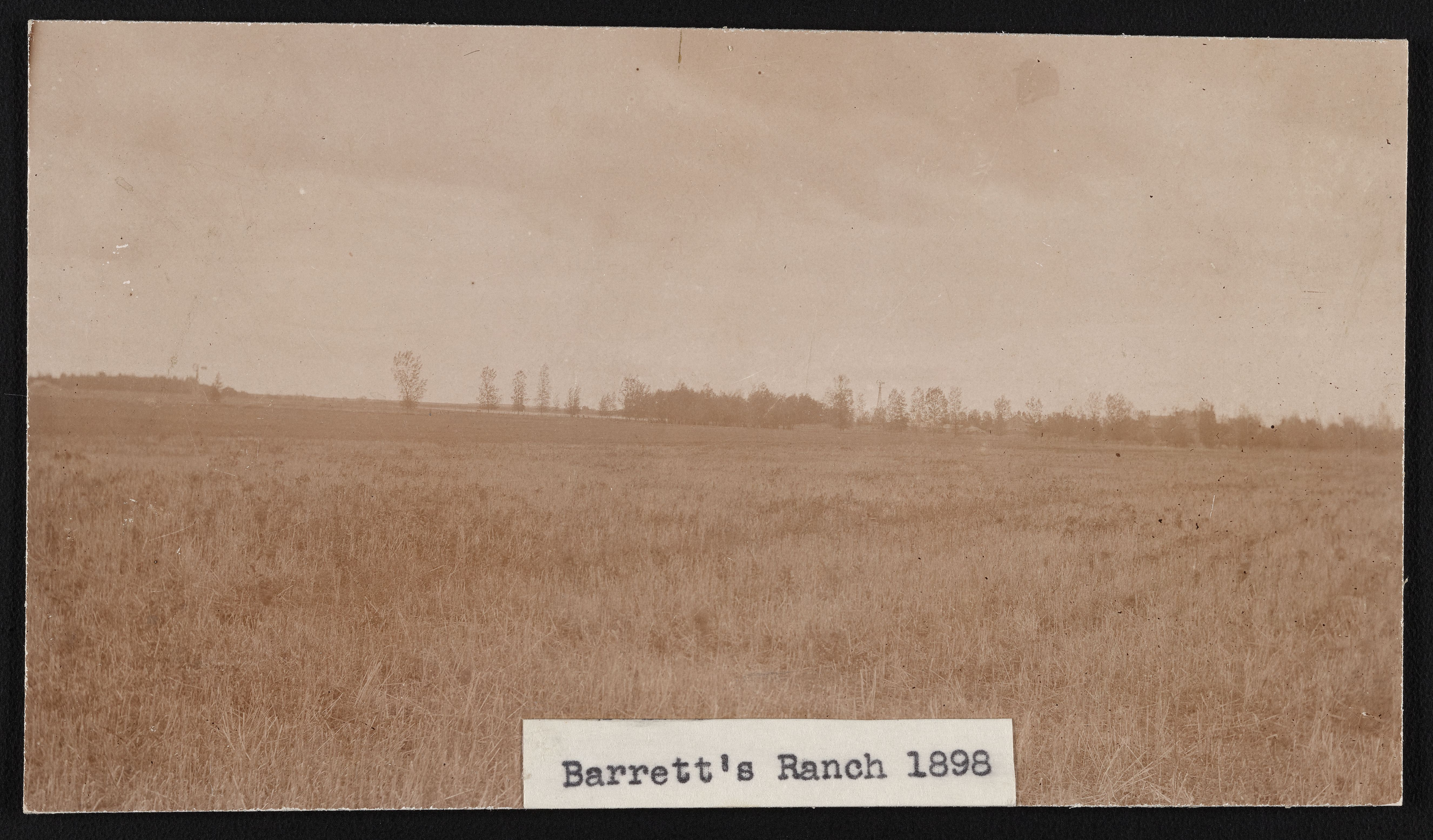
Theodore H. Barrett's ranch in Stevens County, Minnesota.

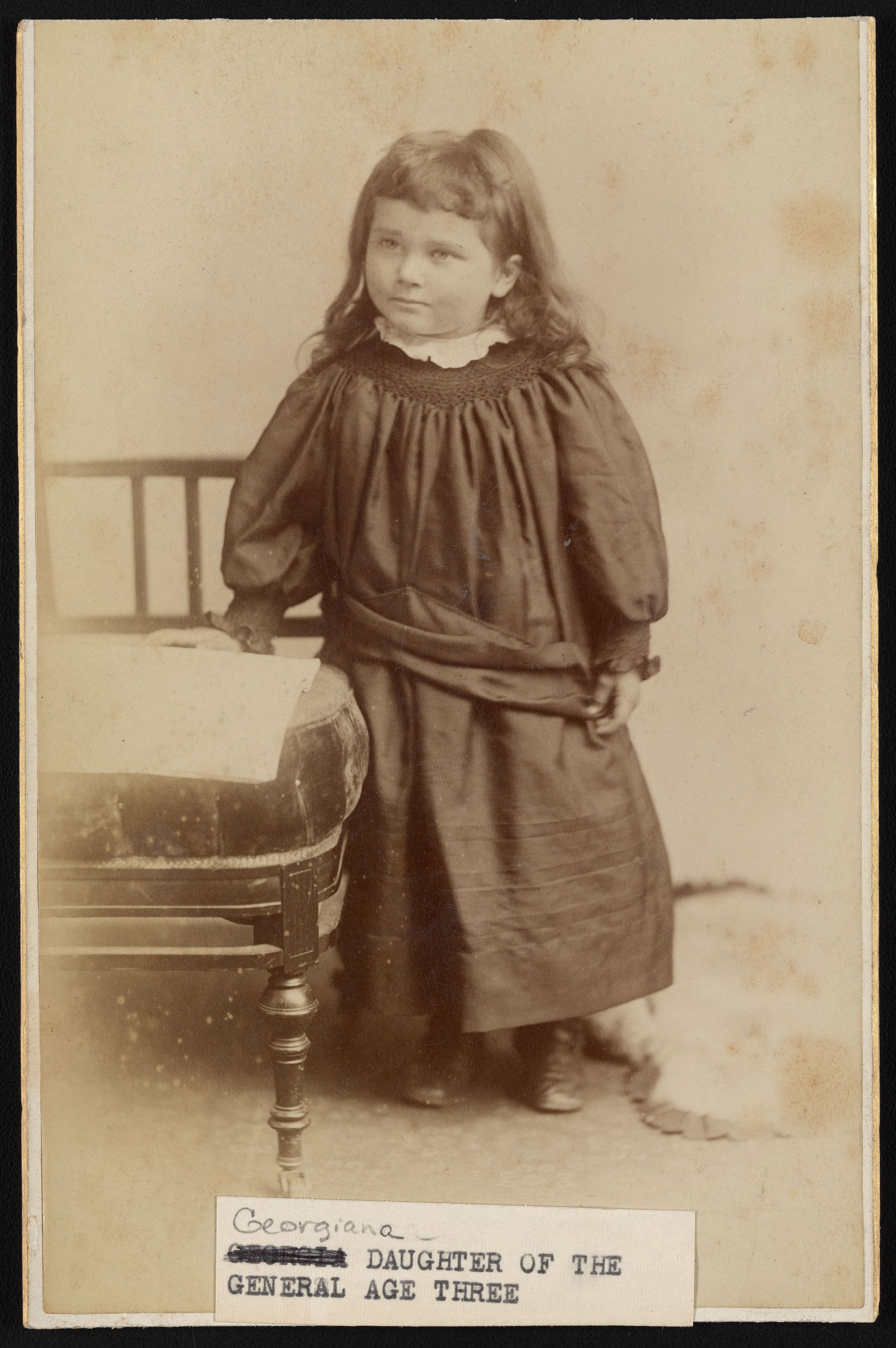
Georgiana Barrett, Theodore Barrett's daughter, age 3.

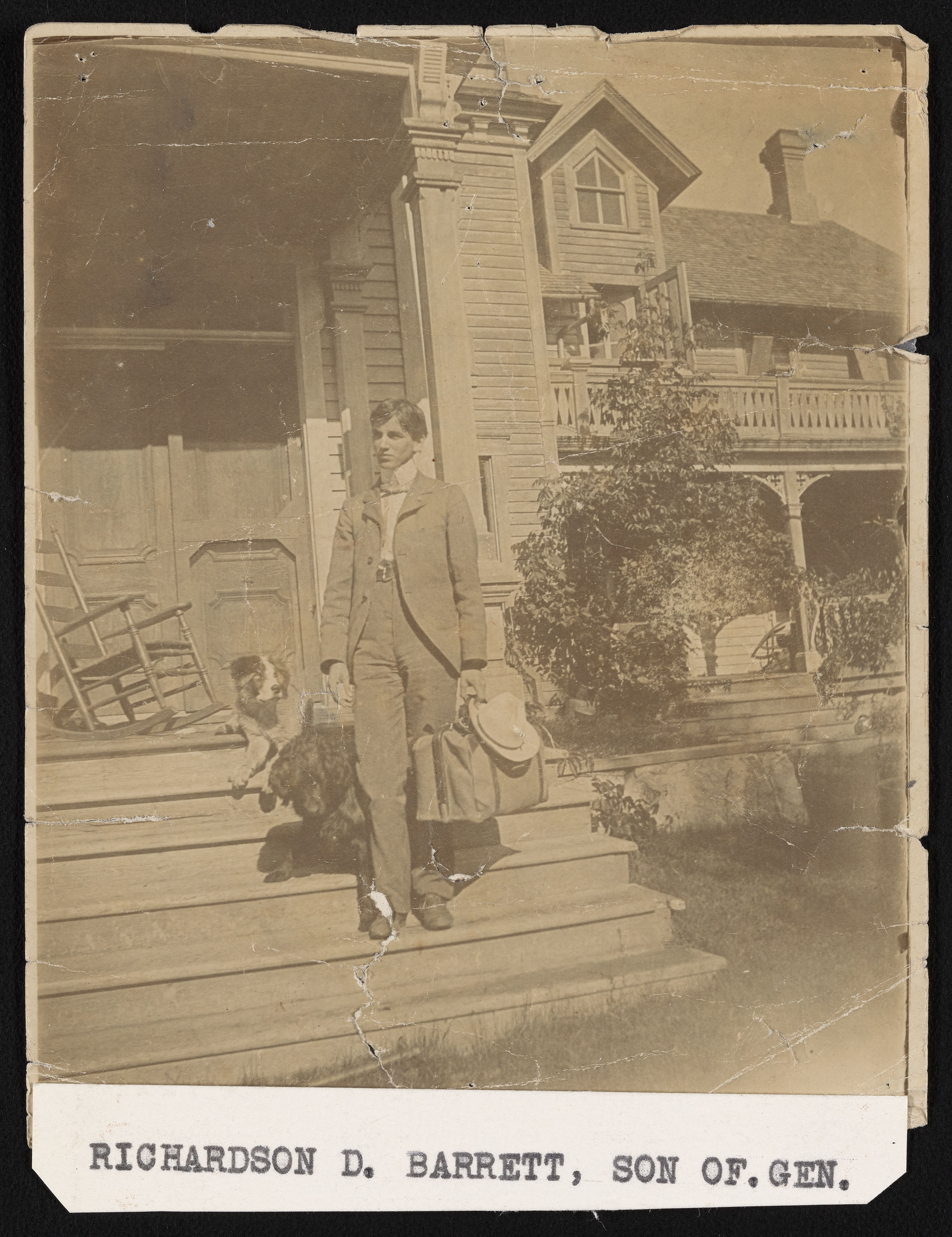
Richardson D. Barrett, Theodore Barrett's son.

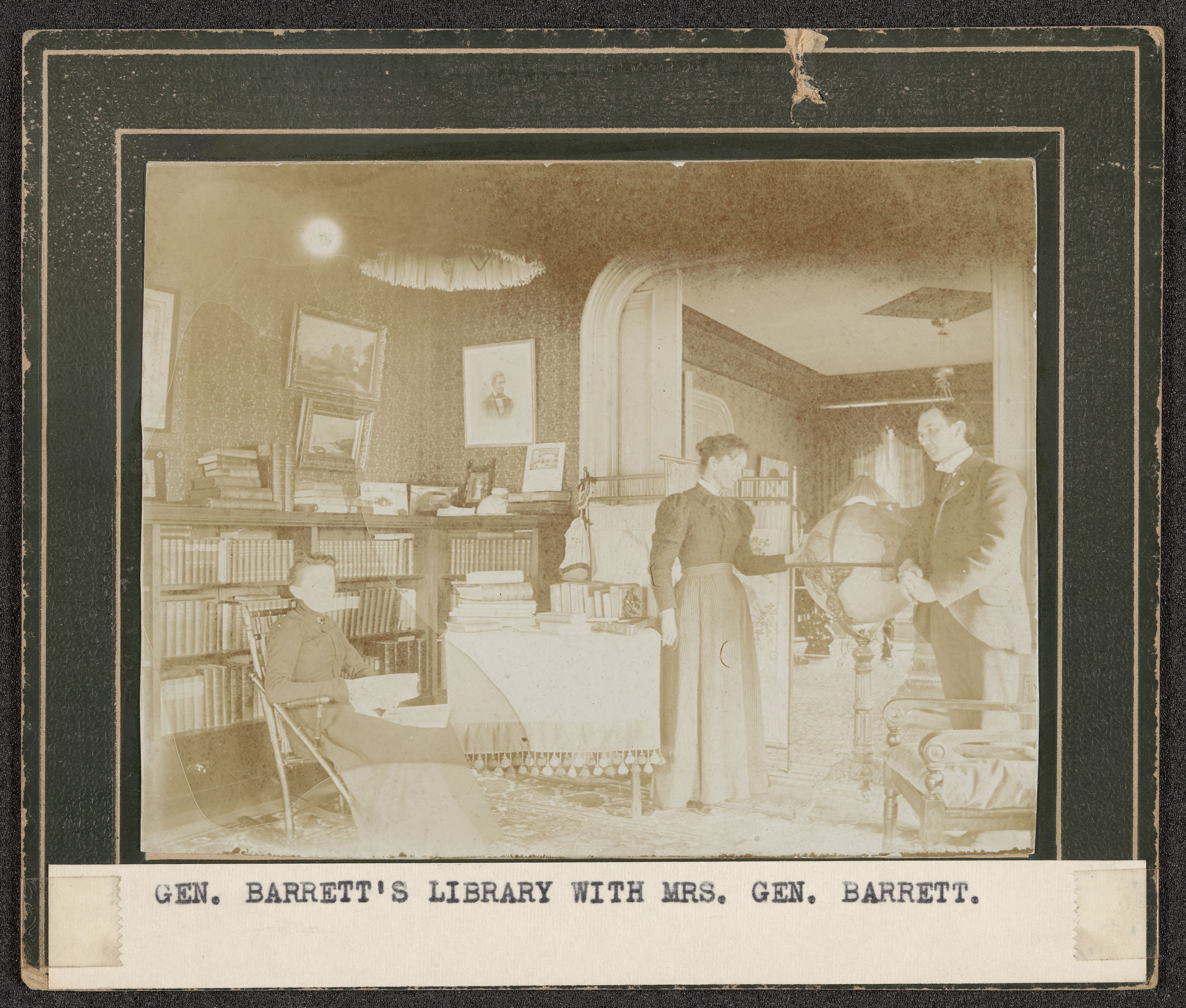
Georgia Barrett in the library in the Barrett house.

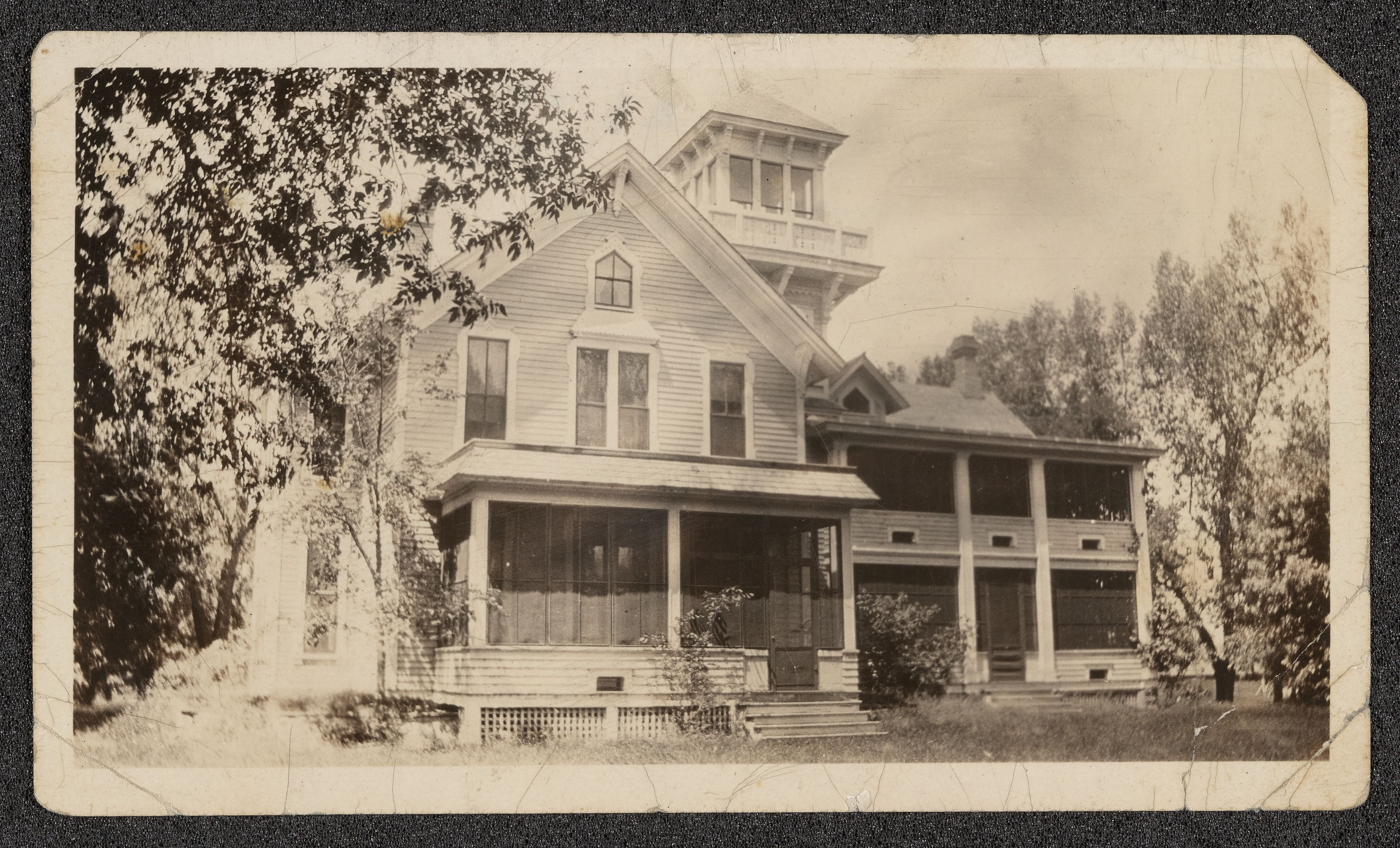
Theodore H. Barrett's house in Stevens County, Minnesota, between 1900 and 1920.

== See also ==
- List of American Civil War brevet generals (Union)
