= Robert Alexander Cameron =

American politician

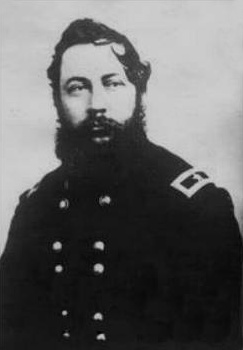
- Robert Alexander Cameron
- Born: February 22, 1828; Brooklyn, New York, US
- Died: March 15, 1894 (aged 66); Cañon City, Colorado, US
- Burial place: Greenwood Cemetery, Cañon City, Colorado
- Military career
- Allegiance: United States; Union
- Branch: United States Army; Union Army
- Service years: 1861–1865
- Rank: Brevet Major General
- Conflicts: American Civil War

Robert Alexander Cameron (February 22, 1828 – March 15, 1894) was an American soldier and newspaper publisher. He served as a Union general during the American Civil War. During the war he was made a brigadier general and after the war was appointed a brevet major general. After the war he was heavily involved in developing farms in the U.S. state of Colorado.

== Early life and career ==
Cameron was born in Brooklyn, New York. He moved with his parents to Valparaiso, Indiana, in the early 1842, where he attended the local public schools. Cameron graduated from Indiana Medical College in La Porte, Indiana, in 1849, and also attended Rush Medical College in Chicago, he soon gave up his medical studies.

In 1857, Cameron bought and began publishing the Valparaiso Republican, a local newspaper. He also served as a Republican delegate to their 1860 convention in Chicago, supporting the campaign of Abraham Lincoln for U.S. President.

== Civil War service ==
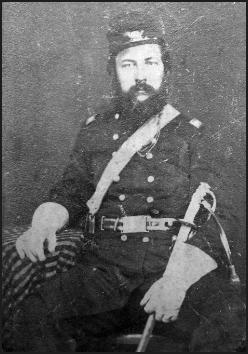
Robert Alexander Cameron

When the American Civil War began, Cameron was a doctor in practice at Valparaiso and a member of the Indiana House of Representatives.

He enlisted in the 9th Indiana, a three-month regiment, and was elected captain on April 23, 1861. With the 9th, Cameron saw service in the Western Virginia Campaigns. After those three months were up, Cameron re-enlisted for the duration of hostilities and was appointed lieutenant colonel of the 19th Indiana Infantry on July 29. In September 1861, Cameron and the 19th Indiana fought in a skirmish at Chain Bridge, one of the bridges over the Potomac River leading into Washington, D.C. After the action Col. Solomon Meredith, Cameron's brigade commander, thought highly of his performance, stating that he "rode the lines giving orders and maintaining a calmness that was not even shattered when the concussion of a shell brought his horse to its knees." Despite this praise, Cameron was not able to get along with Meredith and asked Indiana Governor Oliver Morton to be removed from the 19th and assigned elsewhere. His request would be granted early in the following year.

On February 3, 1862, Cameron was transferred to the 34th Indiana, and Cameron and the 34th fought in Missouri at the action near New Madrid and the following Battle of Island Number Ten from February to April. He also participated in the capture of Memphis, Tennessee, on June 6. Cameron was then promoted to colonel and given command of the 34th, both on June 15.

With his regiment, Cameron participated in the 1863 Vicksburg Campaign, where he was slightly wounded in his eyes during the Battle of Port Gibson on May 1. Cameron was promoted to brigadier general in the Union Army on August 11, 1863. After several stints of brigade command in late 1863 and 1864, he led a division of the XIII Corps during the 1864 Red River Campaign. During the Battle of Mansfield in Louisiana on April 8, Cameron's men attempted to reinforce the crumbling Union line around 5 p.m., but were forced back when it finally broke near 6 p.m.

Cameron finished the war in district command in the Department of the Gulf at Thibodaux, Louisiana. On March 13, 1865, he was appointed a brevet major general in the Union Army, and he resigned his commission soon after on June 22. In 1870, Cameron was influential in the founding of Greeley and was elected president of Greeley’s board of trustees in 1871. He was lured away by William Jackson Palmer to become superintendent of a new colony, which later would grow into the city of Colorado Springs. Cameron also took part in an attempt to establish Fort Collins.

Cameron then moved to San Francisco, California, where he stayed for a few years before returning to Colorado to serve as a postal clerk in Denver. From 1885–87, he served as warden of Colorado State Penitentiary. In the spring of 1894, Cameron died on his farm near Cañon City, Colorado, and was buried there.

== Legacy ==
Cameron's Cone is located in Pike National Forest, about 7 miles (11 km) from Colorado Springs, Colorado, and was named for Robert Alexander Cameron. When originally dedicated, the summit was called Cameron's Cone. Cameron Pass, a gap in the Medicine Bow Mountains range, was also named in his honor in 1870.

== See also ==
- List of American Civil War generals (Union)

== Bibliography ==
- Eicher(1), David J. (2001). The Longest Night: A Military History of the Civil War. Simon & Schuster. ISBN 0-684-84944-5.
- Eicher(2), John H.; David J. Eicher (2001). Civil War High Commands. Stanford University Press. ISBN 0-8047-3641-3.
- Hubbell, John T.; James W. Geary; Jon L. Wakelyn (1995). Biographical Dictionary of the Union: Northern Leaders of the Civil War. Greenwood Publishing Group. ISBN 0-313-20920-0.
- Warner, Ezra J. (1964). Generals in Blue: Lives of the Union Commanders. Louisiana State University Press. ISBN 0-8071-0822-7.
