= Charles Stinson =

American politician

Charles Stinson (1800–1878) was a two-time member of the New Hampshire legislature.

== Life ==
Stinson, a military captain, was from Goffstown, New Hampshire. He was the father of four children, Jane, Letitia, Susan, and Mary. Mary was the wife of Minneapolis industrialist Charles Alfred Pillsbury.

Charles Pillsbury was influential in naming a street after the Stinson family in Stinson Boulevard, Minneapolis.
