= George A. Pillsbury =

American politician (1816–1898)

George Alfred Pillsbury
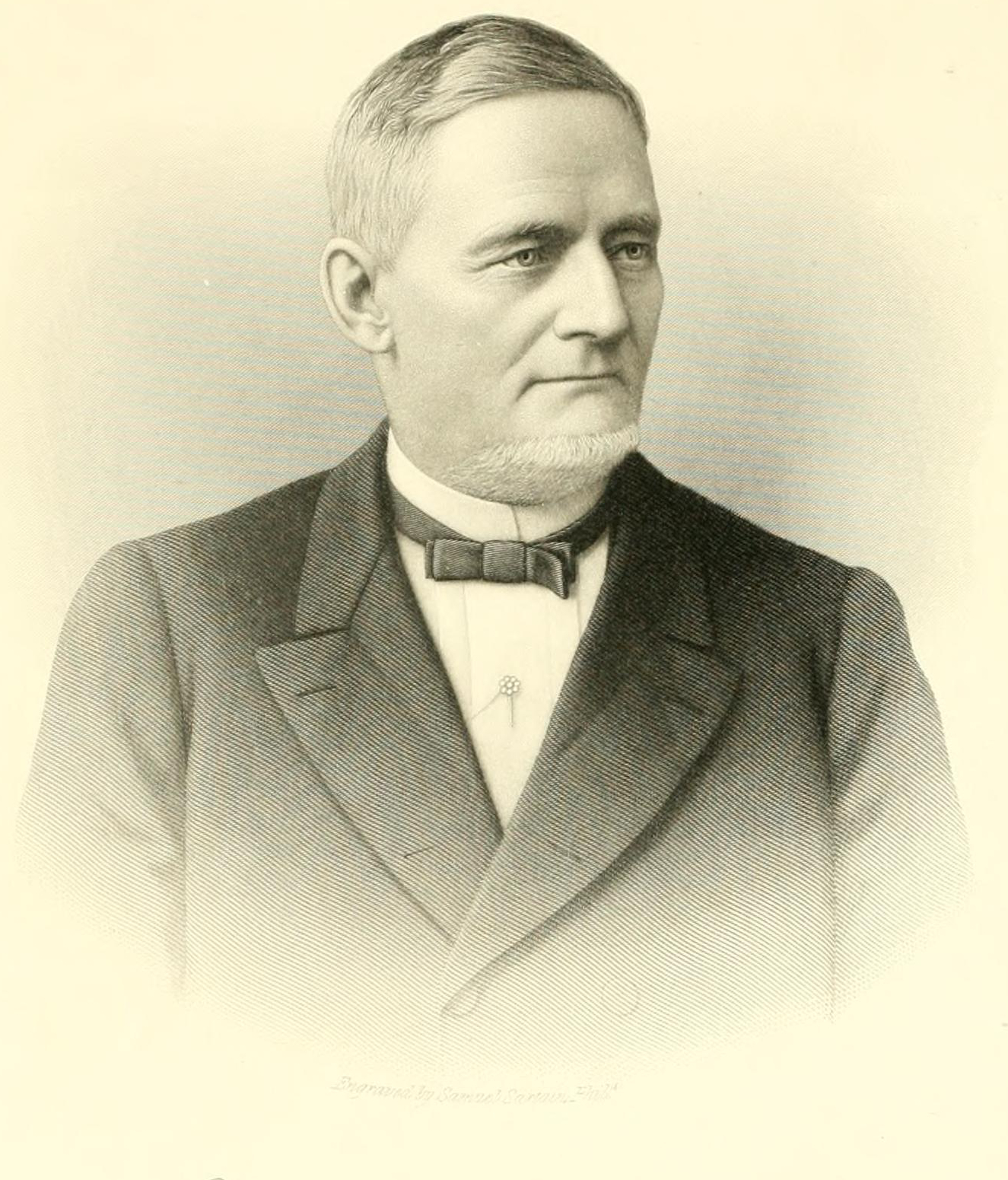
- Pillsbury in 1893

13th Mayor of Minneapolis
- In office April 8, 1884 – April 13, 1886
- Preceded by: A. A. Ames
- Succeeded by: A. A. Ames

Mayor of Concord, New Hampshire
- In office 1876–1877

Member of New Hampshire General Court
- In office 1871–1872
- In office 1850–1851

Personal details
- Born: August 29, 1816 Sutton, New Hampshire, US
- Died: July 17, 1898 (aged 81) Minneapolis, Minnesota, US
- Party: Republican
- Spouse: Margaret S. Carlton
- Children: Charles A. Pillsbury, Mary Addie Pillsbury, Frederick Carlton Pillsbury
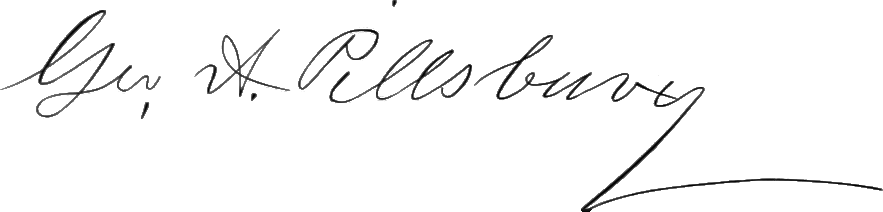
- Signature

George Alfred Pillsbury (August 29, 1816 – July 17, 1898) was a businessman and miller associated with the formation of the Pillsbury Company. He was also a Republican politician active in both New Hampshire and Minnesota.

== Early life and career ==
Pillsbury was born in Sutton, New Hampshire in 1816 to John Pillsbury and Susan Pillsbury (née Wadleigh). Both were the descendants of English settlers who had been active political and civic leaders in New England. Pillsbury attended the local schools until the age of 18 when he moved to Boston, Massachusetts to work as a clerk in a store. After one year, he returned to Sutton and started a business with his cousin John C. Pillsbury. In 1840, he moved to Warner, New Hampshire to work in a store under John H. Pearson. After working there for about a year, he purchased the store outright to run on his own.

In 1841, Pillsbury married Margaret S. Carlton. Together they had three children: Charles A. Pillsbury, Mary Addie (1849-1850) and Frederick Carlton Pillsbury (1852-1892).

Except for a brief period working in Boston, Pillsbury remained in Warner until 1851. During his time there, he was elected to the town's board of selectmen, served as postmaster and town treasurer, and also served in the New Hampshire General Court from 1850 to 1851. In 1851 he moved the family to Concord, New Hampshire where he was appointed to oversee the construction of the county jail. Later that year he began working with the Concord Railroad, a company he remained with for the next 24 years. While working with the railroad, Pillsbury was also active with several major banks in Concord as well as local politics. He was elected to the New Hampshire General Court for a second time from 1871 to 1872 and was also elected the mayor of Concord in 1876 and 1877.

== Minneapolis ==
Several of Pillsbury's family had relocated to Minneapolis including his sons Charles and Fred and his brother John Sargent Pillsbury. In 1878, Pillsbury decided to relocate to Minneapolis and join them. He worked with his son Charles to expand his company Charles A. Pillsbury & Co. He was also involved with several local banks as well as trade and commerce groups. In 1885 he chaired the committee building the Chamber of Commerce (today known as the Minneapolis Grain Exchange).

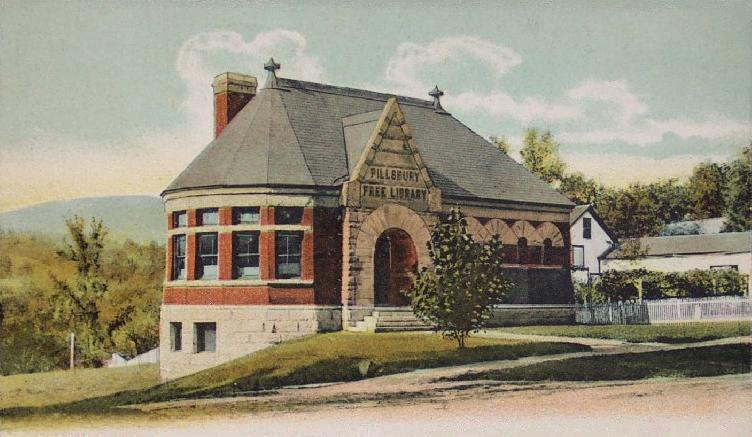
Pillsbury Free Library, Warner, NH

He also remained involved in politics, winning election to the Minneapolis Board of Education and as an alderman in 1881. He was quickly named the president of the city council. In 1884 he ran for mayor, defeating incumbent A. A. Ames. Facing pressure from the temperance movement as the city swelled with saloons, Pillsbury instituted a unique system of "liquor patrol limits" which limited bars to heavily trafficked streets near the city's core which were more likely to be well-patrolled by police. He ran for re-election in 1886 but was defeated by his predecessor A. A. Ames.

Pillsbury also contributed to various charitable causes. He gave to the First Baptist Church of Minneapolis (of which he and his wife were members) and provided the organ for their newly built church at his own expense. He funded the Pillsbury Academy in Owatonna, Minnesota. He also supported causes in his native state including the endowment of a library in Warner, a war memorial in Sutton and the Margaret Pillsbury Hospital in Concord.

== Later life and death ==
Pillsbury died at his home in Minneapolis on July 17, 1898. He is buried in Lakewood Cemetery in Minneapolis.

== Electoral history ==
- Minneapolis Mayoral Election, 1884
  - George A. Pillsbury 12,244
  - A. A. Ames 5,876
  - Charles Evans Holt 862
  - John S. Pillsbury 1
  - C. F. Pillsbury 1
  - Write-Ins and Scattering 2
- Minneapolis Mayoral Election, 1886
  - A. A. Ames 15,151
  - George A. Pillsbury 10,011
  - Wesley M. Lawrence 604
  - Write-Ins and Scattering 6

== See also ==
- List of mayors of Concord, New Hampshire

Political offices
Preceded by A. A. Ames	Mayor of Minneapolis; 1884 – 1886	Succeeded by A. A. Ames
