= John J. Williams (soldier) =

American soldier (1843–1865)

John Jefferson Williams
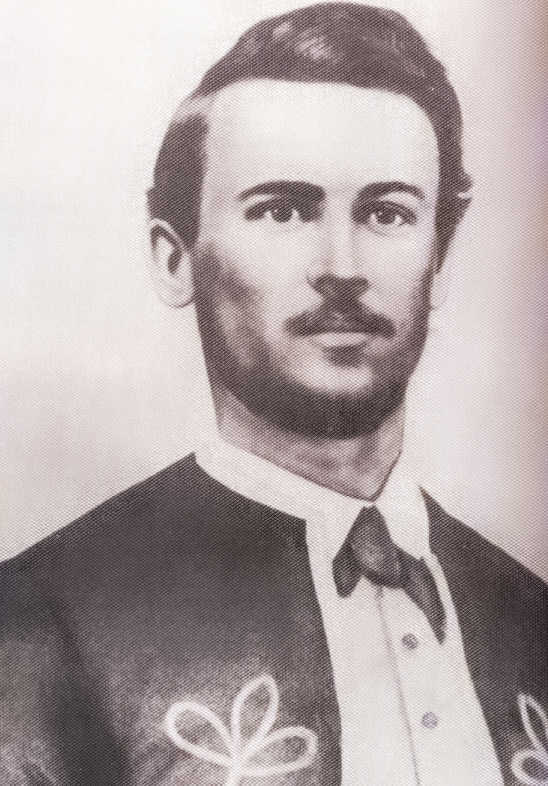
- Born: 1843; Jay County, Indiana, U.S.
- Died: May 13, 1865 (aged 21–22); Cameron County, Texas, U.S.
- Burial place: Jay County Infirmary Cemetery
- Military career
- Allegiance: United States
- Branch: Union Army
- Service years: 1863–1865
- Rank: Private
- Unit: 34th Regiment Indiana Infantry
- Conflicts: American Civil War: Battle of Palmito Ranch †

John Jefferson Williams (1843 – May 13, 1865) was a Union soldier and private in Company B the 34th Regiment Indiana Infantry. He was killed at the Battle of Palmito Ranch, the last land battle of the American Civil War, and is generally recognized as the last soldier killed in the conflict.

== Biography ==
Williams was born in the year 1843 in Jay County, Indiana, and joined the Union Army in September, 1863, probably in Anderson. He moved to Camp Joe Holt where his unit drilled before being put on duty in their field. His regiment spent most of the war on guard and garrison duty in the Western Theatre, including New Orleans where he was stationed before his unit joined the army forming for the invasion and occupation of Texas in spring of 1865. He first saw action in the Battle of Palmito Ranch near Brownsville, Texas, where he died on May 13, 1865. Williams is generally recognized as being the last soldier to have been killed in action during the Civil War, although some sources make this claim for Corporal John W. Skinner, killed on May 19, 1865, in an ambush at Hobdy's Bridge, near Eufaula, Alabama.

He was buried at Alexandria National Cemetery in Pineville, Louisiana. His remains were later moved to his hometown in Jay County, Indiana around 1897 or 1898, and buried at the Jay County Infirmary Cemetery.

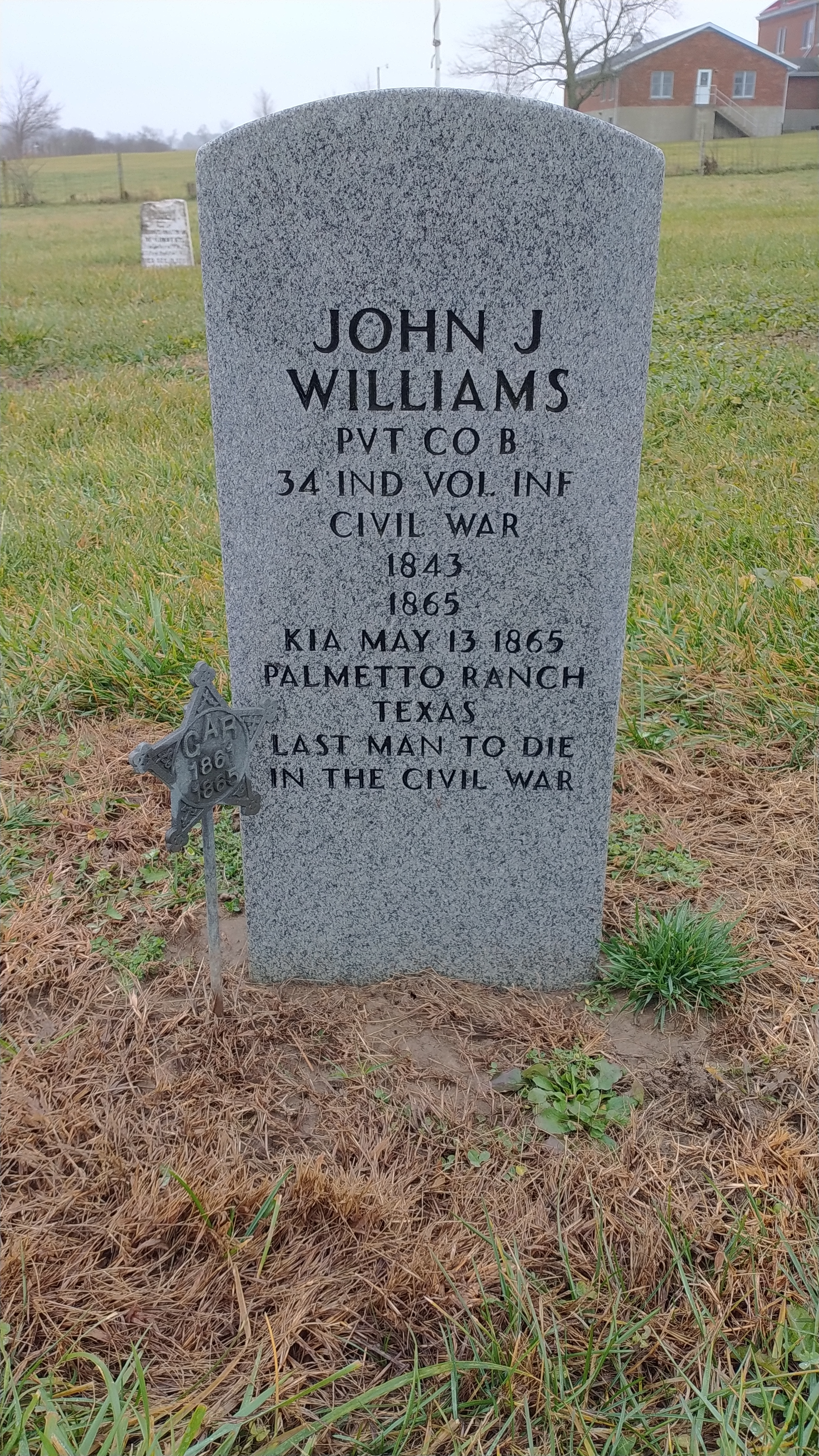
Jay County Infirmary Cemetery

== See also ==
- Indiana in the American Civil War
- Daniel Hough – First American soldier to die in the Civil War
