= Battle of Palmito Ranch =

Final battle of the American Civil War

- Part of the Trans-Mississippi Theater of the American Civil War
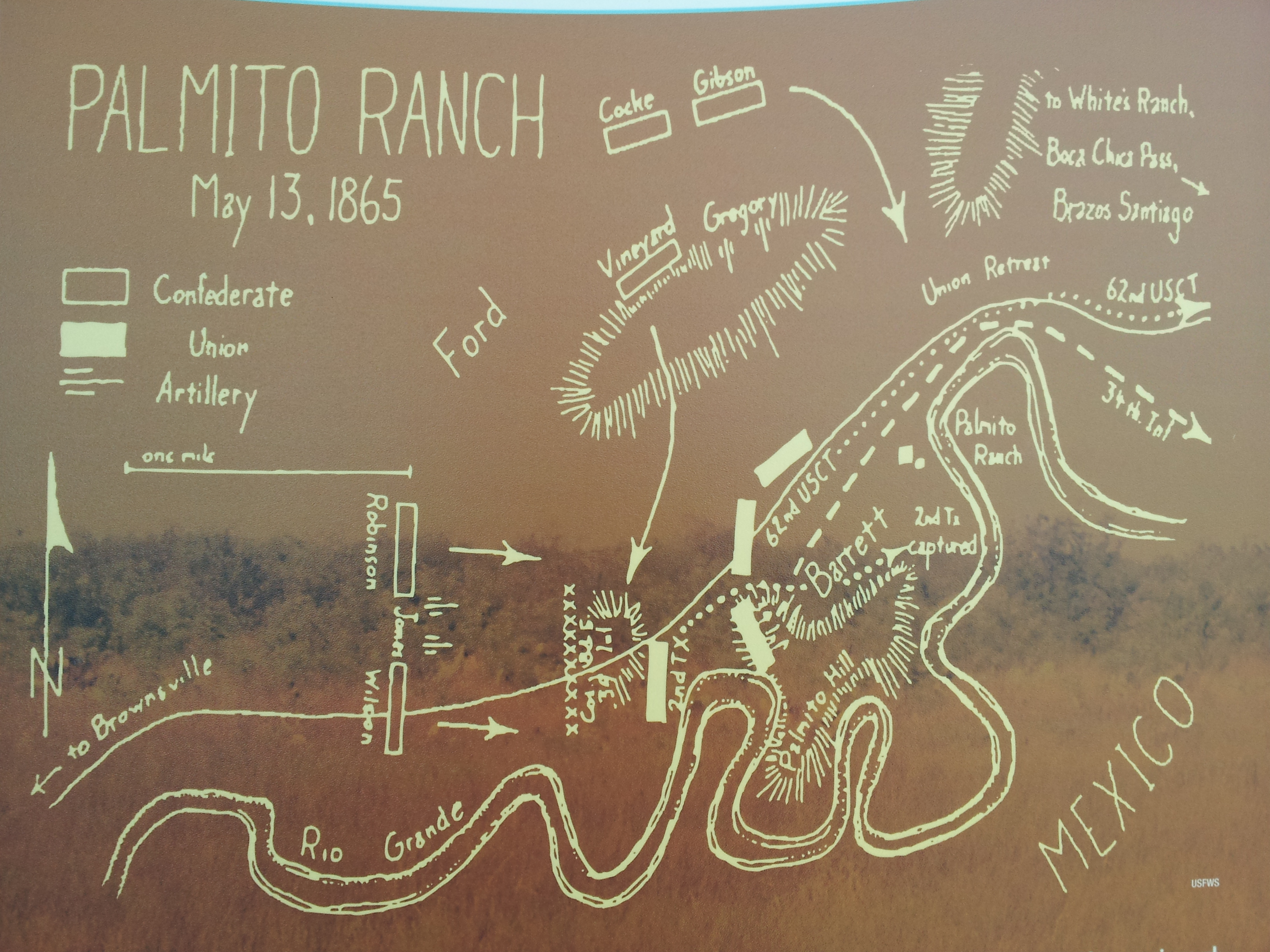
- Sketch map of battle
Date	May 12–13, 1865
Location	Cameron County, Texas
Result	Confederate victory

Belligerents
United States (Union)	Confederate States

Commanders and leaders
Brigadier general Theodore H. Barrett	Colonel John "Rip" Ford

Units involved
2nd Texas United States Cavalry (dismounted); 62nd Regiment U.S. Colored Troops; 34th Indiana Veteran Volunteer Infantry	2nd Texas Confederate Cavalry Regiment; Gidding's Regiment; Anderson's Battalion; Benavides' Regiment

Strength
500	300

Casualties and losses
4–30 killed 12 wounded 101 captured	5–6 wounded 3 captured

The Battle of Palmito Ranch, also known as the Battle of Palmito Hill, is considered by some criteria the final battle of the American Civil War. It was fought May 12 and 13, 1865, on the banks of the Rio Grande east of Brownsville, Texas, and a few miles from the seaport of Los Brazos de Santiago, at the southern tip of Texas. The battle took place more than a month after the surrender of the Army of Northern Virginia under Robert E. Lee to Union forces at Appomattox Court House, which had since been communicated to both commanders at Palmito. However, in early May Confederate General Edmund Kirby Smith had rejected a proposal from Union Major-General John Pope to surrender Confederate forces in the Trans-Mississippi Department on the same terms that General Ulysses S. Grant had given to Robert E. Lee. As such Kirby Smith only officially surrendered all Confederate forces in the Trans-Mississippi Department on June 2, 1865.

Union and Confederate forces in southern Texas had been observing an unofficial truce since the beginning of 1865, but Union Colonel Theodore H. Barrett, newly assigned to command an all-black unit and never having been involved in combat, ordered an attack on a Confederate camp near Fort Brown for unknown reasons. The Union attackers captured a few prisoners, but the following day the attack was repulsed near Palmito Ranch by Colonel John Salmon Ford, and the battle resulted in a Confederate victory. Union forces were surprised by artillery said to have been supplied by the French Army garrison occupying the up-river Mexican town of Matamoros.

Casualty estimates are not dependable, but Union Private John J. Williams of the 34th Indiana Infantry Regiment is believed to have been the last man killed during the engagement. He could then arguably be considered the last man killed in the American Civil War.

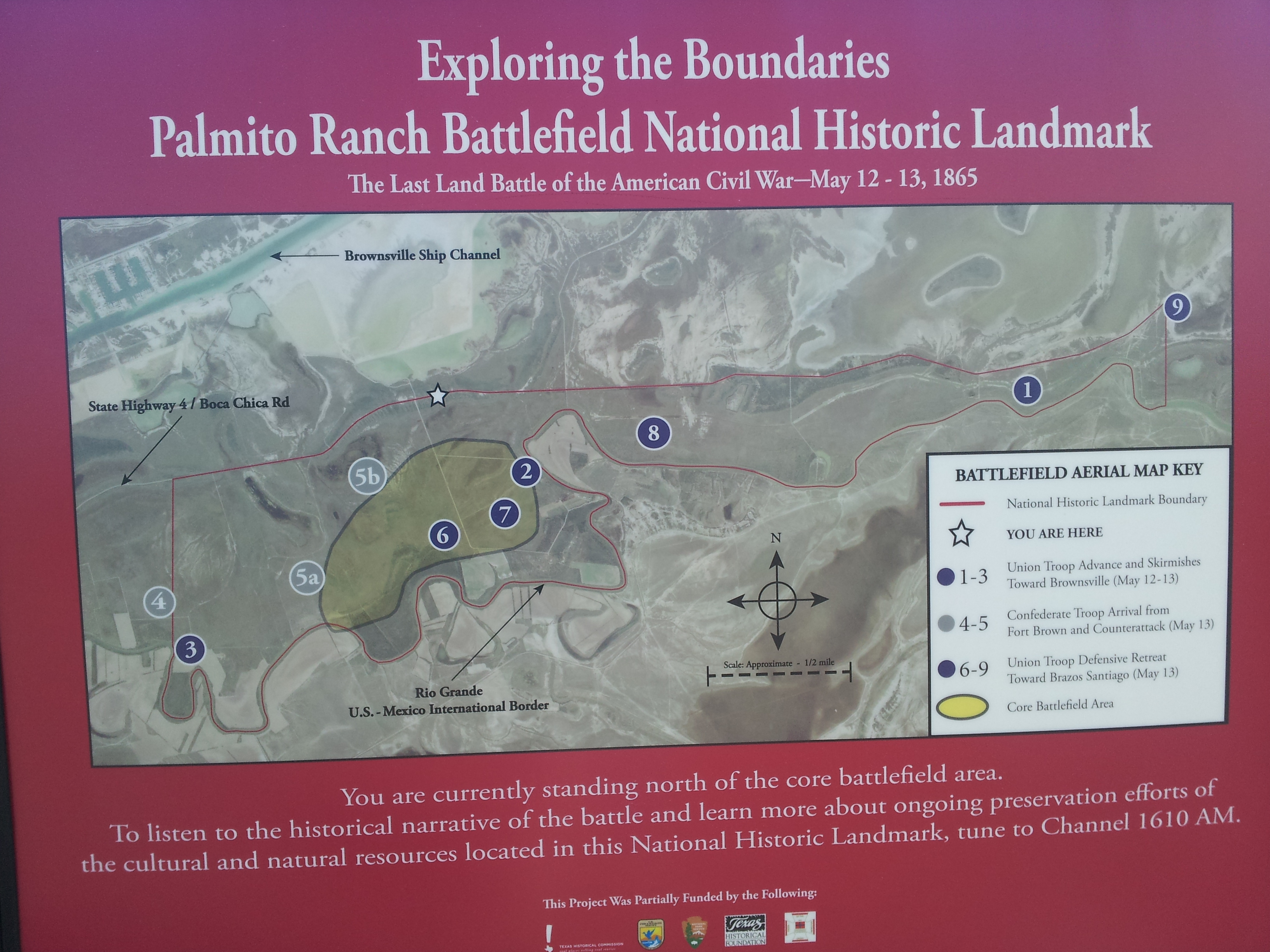
Marker on Texas State Highway 4

== Background ==
After July 27, 1864, the Union Army withdrew most of the 6,500 troops deployed to the lower Rio Grande Valley, including Brownsville, which they had occupied since November 2, 1863. The Confederates were determined to protect their remaining ports, which were essential for cotton sales to Europe and the importation of supplies. The Mexicans across the border tended to side with the Confederates because of the lucrative cotton export trade. Beginning in early 1865, the rival armies in south Texas honored a gentlemen's agreement, as they saw no point in further hostilities between them.

Union Major General Lew Wallace proposed a negotiated end of hostilities in Texas to Confederate Brigadier General James E. Slaughter, and met with Slaughter and his subordinate Colonel Ford at Port Isabel on March 11–12, 1865. Despite Slaughter's and Ford's agreement that combat would prove tragic, Slaughter's superior, Confederate Maj. Gen. John G. Walker, rejected the ceasefire in a scathing exchange of letters with Wallace. Despite this, both sides honored a tacit agreement not to advance on the other without prior written notice.

A brigade of 1,900 Union troops commanded by Col. Robert B. Jones of the 34th Indiana Veteran Volunteer Infantry were on blockade duty at the Port of Brazos Santiago at the mouth of the present-day ship channel of the Port of Brownsville. The 400-man 34th Indiana was an experienced regiment that had served in the Vicksburg Campaign and was reorganized in December 1863 as a "Veteran" regiment, composed entirely of veterans from several other regiments whose original enlistments had expired. The 34th Indiana deployed to Los Brazos de Santiago on December 22, 1864, replacing the 91st Illinois Volunteer Infantry, which returned to New Orleans. The brigade also included the 87th and 62nd United States Colored Infantry Regiments ("United States Colored Troops", or U.S.C.T.) which had a combined strength of about 1,100. Shortly after Gen. Walker rejected the armistice proposal, Col. Jones resigned from the army to return to Indiana. He was replaced in the regiment by Lt. Col. Robert G. Morrison and at Los Brazos de Santiago by Colonel Theodore H. Barrett, commander of the 62nd U.S.C.T.

The 30-year-old Barrett had been an army officer since 1862, but he had yet to see combat. Anxious for higher rank, he volunteered for the newly raised "colored" regiments and was appointed in 1863 as colonel of the 1st Missouri Colored Infantry. In March 1864, the regiment became the 62nd U.S.C.T. Regiment. Barrett contracted malaria in Louisiana that summer, and while he was on convalescent leave, the 62nd was posted to Los Brazos de Santiago. He joined it there in February 1865.

== Reasons for fighting ==
Historians still debate why this engagement at Palmito Ranch took place. Lee had surrendered to Grant in Appomattox Court House, Virginia, on April 9, triggering a series of formal surrenders in other places throughout the country. The Confederate and Union officers in Brownsville knew that Lee had surrendered, effectively ending the war. However, the Confederate General commanding the Trans-Mississippi Department, Edmund Kirby-Smith, had not yet surrendered.

Soon after the battle, Barrett's detractors claimed he desired "a little battlefield glory before the war ended altogether." Others have suggested that Barrett needed horses for the 300 unmounted cavalrymen in his brigade and decided to take them from his enemy. Louis J. Schuler, in his 1960 pamphlet "The last battle in the War Between the States, May 13, 1865: Confederate Force of 300 defeats 1,700 Federals near Brownsville, Texas", asserts that Brig. Gen. Egbert B. Brown of the U.S. Volunteers had ordered the expedition to seize as contraband 2,000 bales of cotton stored in Brownsville and sell them for his own profit, but Brown was not even appointed to command at Brazos Santiago until later in May.

According to historian Jerry Thompson:

What was at stake was honor, money, and perhaps a bit of racism. With a stubborn reluctance to admit defeat, Ford asserted that the dignity and manhood of his men had to be defended. Having previously proclaimed that he would never capitulate to "a mongrel force of Abolitionists, Negroes, plundering Mexicans, and perfidious renegades"...Ford was not about to surrender to invading black troops.... Ever more important was the large quantity of Richard King and Mifflin Kenedy's cotton stacked in Brownsville waiting to be sent across the river to Matamoros. If Ford did not hold off the invading Federal force, the cotton would be confiscated by the Yankees and thousands of dollars lost."

== Battle ==
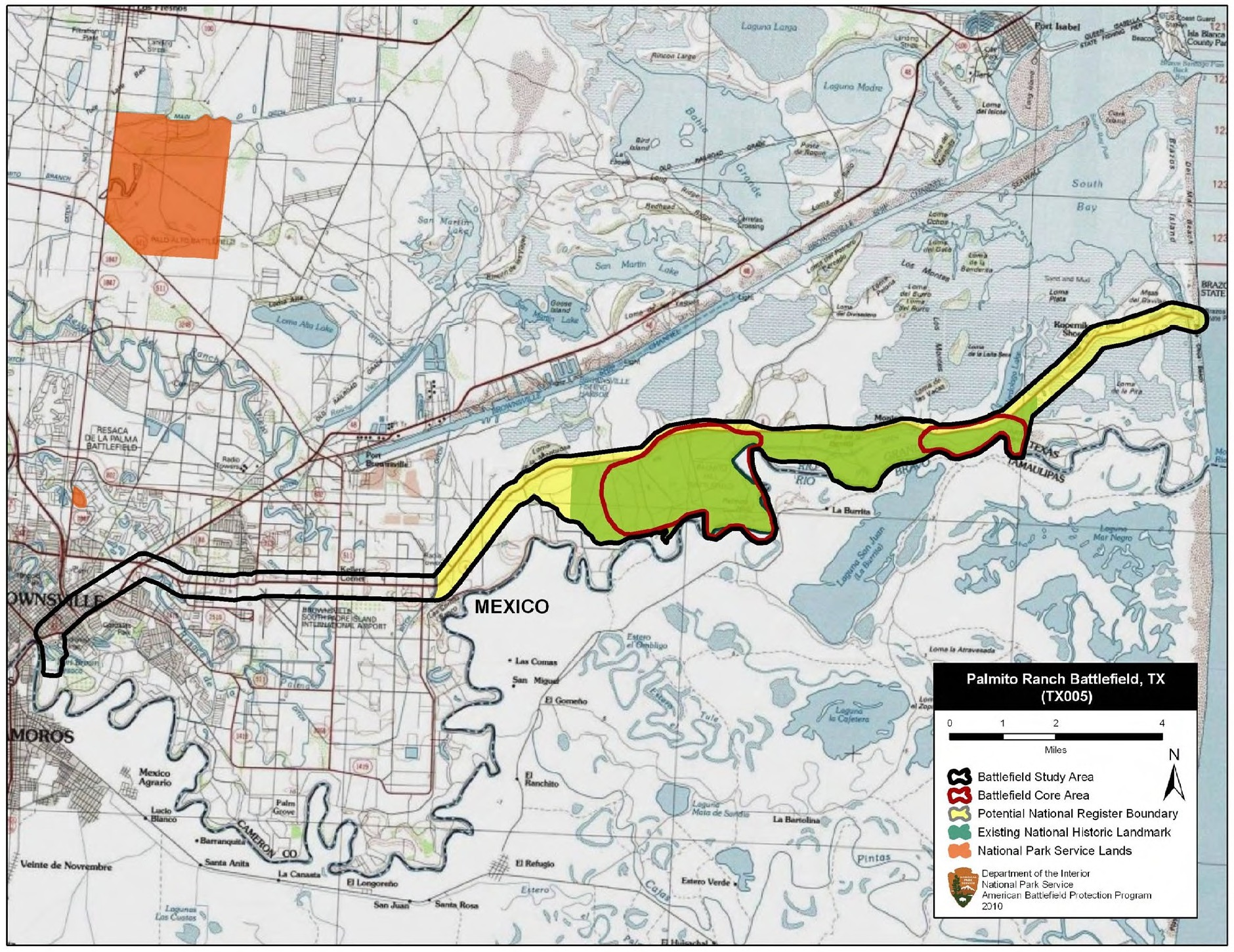
Map of Palmito Ranch Battlefield core and study areas by the American Battlefield Protection Program

Union Lieutenant Colonel David Branson wanted to attack the Confederate encampments commanded by Ford at White and Palmito ranches near Fort Brown outside Brownsville. Branson's Union forces consisted of 250 men of the 62nd U.S.C.T. in eight companies and two companies of the (U.S.) 2nd Texas Cavalry Battalion. The 300-man 2nd Texas, like the earlier-formed 1st Texas Cavalry Regiment, was composed largely of Texans of Mexican origin who remained loyal to the United States. They moved from Brazos Santiago to the mainland. At first Branson's expedition was successful, capturing three prisoners and some supplies, although it failed to achieve the desired surprise. During the afternoon, Confederate forces under Captain William N. Robinson counterattacked with less than 100 cavalry, driving Branson back to White's Ranch, where the fighting stopped for the night. Both sides sent for reinforcements; Ford arrived with six French guns and the remainder of his cavalry force (for a total of 300 men), while Barrett came with 200 troops of the 34th Indiana in nine under-strength companies.

The next day, Barrett started advancing westward, passing a half-mile to the west of Palmito Ranch, with skirmishers from the 34th Indiana deployed in advance. Ford attacked Barrett's force as it was skirmishing with an advance Confederate force along the Rio Grande about 4 p.m. He sent a couple of companies with artillery to attack the Union right flank and the remainder of his force into a frontal attack. After some confusion and fierce fighting, the Union forces retreated toward Boca Chica. Barrett attempted to form a rearguard, but Confederate artillery prevented him from rallying a force large enough to do so. During the retreat, which lasted until 14 May, 50 members of the 34th Indiana's rearguard company, 30 stragglers, and 20 of the dismounted cavalry were surrounded in a bend of the Rio Grande and captured. The battle is recorded as a Confederate victory.

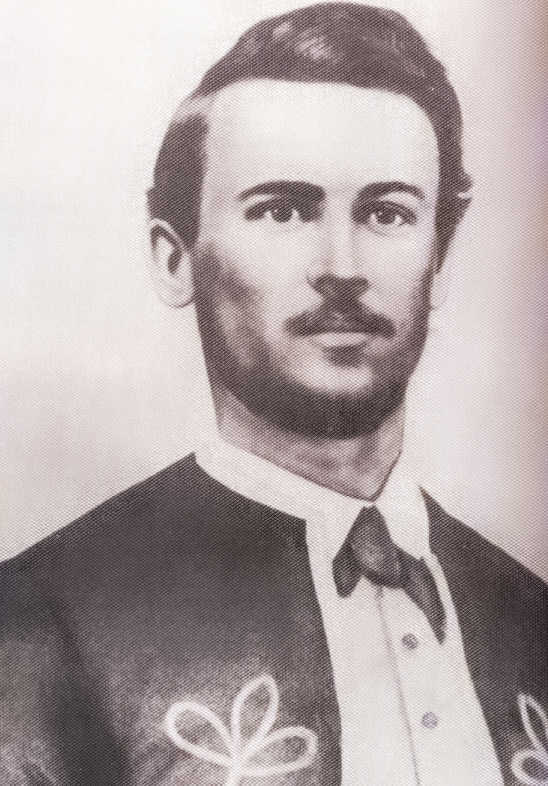
John J. Williams, the presumed last soldier to die in the American Civil War

Fighting in the battle involved Caucasian, African-American, Hispanic, and Native American troops. Reports of shots from the Mexican side, the sounding of a warning to the Confederates of the Union approach, the crossing of Imperial cavalry into Texas, and the participation by several among Ford's troops are unverified, despite many witnesses reporting shooting from the Mexican shore.

In Barrett's official report of August 10, 1865, he reported 115 Union casualties: one killed, nine wounded, and 105 captured. Confederate casualties were reported as five or six wounded, with none killed. Historian and Ford biographer Stephen B. Oates, however, concludes that Union deaths were much higher, probably around 30, many of whom drowned in the Rio Grande or were attacked by French border guards on the Mexican side. He likewise estimated Confederate casualties at approximately the same number.

Using court-martial testimony and post returns from Brazos Santiago, historian Jerry D. Thompson of Texas A&M International University determined that:

- the 62nd U.S.C.T. incurred two killed and four wounded;
- the 34th Indiana had one killed, one wounded, and 79 captured; and
- the 2nd Texas Cavalry Battalion had one killed, seven wounded, and 22 captured,
- totaling four killed, 12 wounded, and 101 captured.

Private John J. Williams of the 34th Indiana was the last fatality during the Battle at Palmito Ranch, likely making him the final combat death of the entire war.

== Aftermath ==
President Jefferson Davis was captured and imprisoned on May 10, 1865, marking the effective end of the Confederate government. In addition, that day United States President Andrew Johnson declared "armed resistance ...virtually at an end." Historian James McPherson joins other historians in concluding that the war ended when the Confederate government ended.

Confederate General Edmund Kirby Smith officially surrendered all Confederate forces in the Trans-Mississippi Department on June 2, 1865, except those under the command of Brigadier General Chief Stand Watie in the Indian Territory. Stand Watie, of the 1st Cherokee Mounted Rifles, on June 23, 1865, became the last Confederate general to surrender his forces, in Doaksville, Indian Territory. On that same day, United States President Andrew Johnson ended the Union blockade of the Southern states.

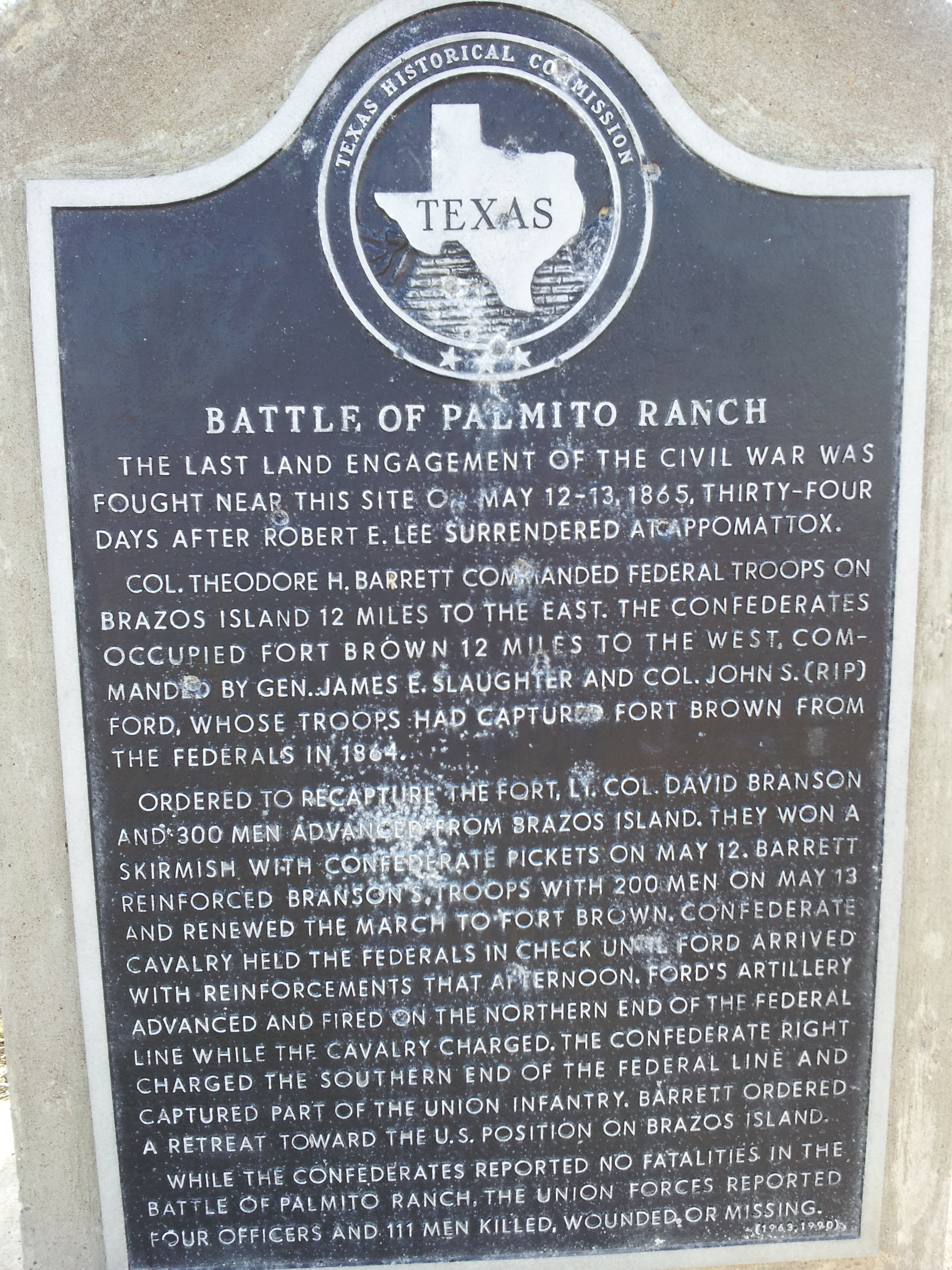
Texas historical marker

Many senior Confederate commanders in Texas (including Smith, Walker, Slaughter, and Ford) and many troops with their equipment fled across the border to Mexico. Wanting to resist capture, they may also have intended to ally with French Imperial forces, or with Mexican forces under deposed President Benito Juárez.

The Military Division of the Southwest (after June 27 the Division of the Gulf), commanded by Maj. Gen. Phillip H. Sheridan, occupied Texas between June and August. Consisting of the IV Corps, XIII Corps, the African-American XXV Corps, and two 4,000-man cavalry divisions commanded by Brig. Gen. Wesley Merritt and Maj. Gen. George A. Custer, it aggregated a 50,000-man force on the Gulf Coast and along the Rio Grande to pressure the French intervention in Mexico and garrison the Reconstruction Department of Texas.

In July 1865, Barrett proffered charges of disobedience of orders, neglect of duty, abandoning his colors, and conduct prejudicial to good order and military discipline against Morrison for actions in the battle, resulting in the latter's court martial. Confederate Col. Ford, who had returned from Mexico at the request of Union Gen. Frederick Steele to act as parole commissioner for disbanding Confederate forces, appeared as a defense witness and assisted in absolving Morrison of responsibility for the defeat at Palmito Ranch.

The history of this engagement provides accounts of the roles of Hispanic Confederate veterans and of the treatment by Confederates in South Texas of black prisoners of war. Hispanic Confederates served at Fort Brown in Brownsville and on the field of Palmito Ranch. Col. Santos Benavides, who was the highest-ranking Hispanic in either army, led between 100 and 150 Hispanic soldiers in the Brownsville Campaign in May 1865.

Some of the Sixty-Second Colored Regiment were also taken [in the Battle of Palmito Ranch]. They had been led to believe that if captured they would either be shot or returned to slavery. They were agreeably surprised when they were paroled and permitted to depart with the white prisoners. Several of the prisoners were from Austin and vicinity. They were assured they would be treated as prisoners of war. There was no disposition to visit upon them a mean spirit of revenge.

— Colonel John Salmon Ford, May 1865

When Colonel Ford surrendered his command following the campaign of Palmito Ranch, he urged his men to honor their paroles. He insisted that "The negro had a right to vote."

== "Last battle of the Civil War" ==
Although officially most historians say this was the last land action fought between the North and the South, some sources suggest that the battle on May 19, 1865, of Hobdy's Bridge, located near Eufaula, Alabama, was the last skirmish between the two forces. Union records show that the last Northern soldier killed in combat during the war was Corporal John W. Skinner in this action. Three others were wounded, also from the same unit, Company C, 1st Florida U.S. Cavalry.

Historian Richard Gardiner stated in 2013 that on May 10, 1865:

A confrontation took place at Palmetto Ranch. There was no Confederacy in existence when the "battle" occurred. The ex-Confederates at Palmetto Ranch were aware that Lee had surrendered and that the war was over. What happened in Texas can only be understood as a "post-war" encounter between Federals and ex-Confederate "outlaws."

The Confederates won this engagement, but as there was no organized command structure, there has been controversy about the Union casualties. In 1896 these same men had their pensions cut, although this was quickly rectified by an appeal to the commissioner of pensions. The assistant secretary to the commissioner overturned the pension cut, legally ruling the men as the last Union casualties of the war.

On April 2, 1866, President Johnson declared the insurrection at an end, except in Texas. There a technicality concerning incomplete formation of a new state government prevented declaring the insurrection over. Johnson declared the insurrection at an end in Texas and throughout the United States on August 20, 1866.

== Battlefield ==
- Palmito Ranch Battlefield
- U.S. National Register of Historic Places
- U.S. National Historic Landmark
- Location within Texas Location within the United States
- Nearest city: Brownsville, Texas
- Coordinates: 25°56′48″N 97°17′7″W
- Area: 6,000 acres (2,400 ha)
- NRHP reference No.: 93000266

Significant dates
- Added to NRHP: June 23, 1993
- Designated NHL: September 25, 1997

The area has remained relatively unchanged, with the marshy, windswept prairies almost the same as they were in 1865. The site is more than 5,400 acres (2,200 ha) in size, and was designated as a National Historic Landmark in 1997. The area is indicated by a large highway marker telling the history of the engagement, installed on the "Boca Chica Highway" (Texas State Highway 4) near where Palmito Ranch originally stood. The Civil War Trust (a division of the American Battlefield Trust) and its partners have acquired and preserved 3 acres (0.012 km^{2}) of the battlefield.

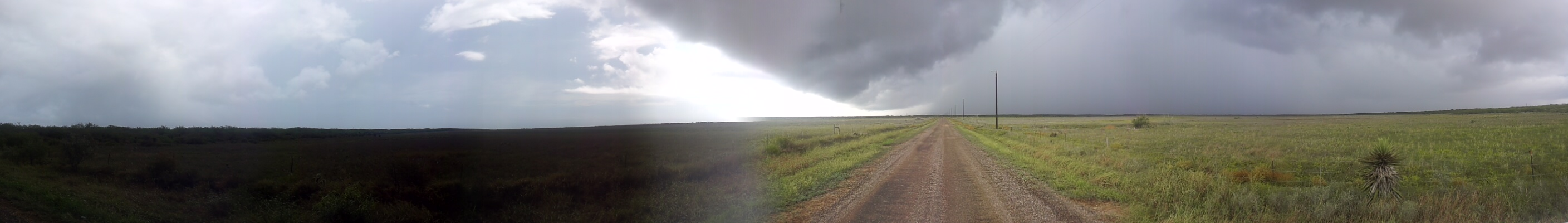
Panorama of the battlefield

== See also ==
- List of National Historic Landmarks in Texas
- National Register of Historic Places listings in Cameron County, Texas
