= John De Laittre =

American politician (1832–1912)

10th Mayor of Minneapolis
- In office April 10, 1877 – April 9, 1878
- Preceded by: A. A. Ames
- Succeeded by: Alonzo Cooper Rand

Personal details
- Born: March 5, 1832 Ellsworth, Maine, U.S.
- Died: September 19, 1912 (aged 80) Minneapolis, Minnesota, U.S.
- Resting place: Lakewood Cemetery
- Party: Republican
- Spouse: Clara Eastman

John De Laittre (March 5, 1832 – September 19, 1912) was a businessman and the 10th mayor of Minneapolis, Minnesota.

== Early life ==
De Laittre was born in 1832 in Ellsworth, Maine, to Charles De Laittre and Rosalie Levalle Desisles. His paternal grandparents were Huguenots. As a child he helped with work on the family farm and attended local schools. After turning 18, he worked for several years on fishing boats operating in the Bay of Fundy and Straits of Belle Isle. In 1852, he decided to move to California, arriving in San Francisco, California later that year and making his way to Murphys, California to prospect for gold with an old friend. While the two were unsuccessful in mining for gold, De Laittre became involved in a profitable mill which supplied lumber to the area's miners and also invested in other local businesses.

In May 1860, he returned home to visit his mother who was in poor health. After her death in October 1860, he returned to California after a brief stop in Conway, New Hampshire to deliver some letters on behalf of friends. While visiting there he became engaged to Clara Eastman and promised he would settle his affairs in California and return within 6 months. Soon after he returned to California the American Civil War began, delaying his return until after the war had ended. The two were married in July 1865 at the William K. Eastman House and, after briefly visiting Boston and New York, the two decided to set out for Minneapolis, Minnesota, to connect with Clara's brother who had moved there previously.

== Minneapolis ==
After arriving in Minneapolis, De Laittre became involved in the milling industry (with his now brother-in-law William Wallace Eastman) and became a partner in the North Star Woolen Mill. He later formed several companies in the lumber industry. In 1877 he ran for mayor of Minneapolis as a Republican, defeating incumbent A. A. Ames. While he was pushed to run for a second term, De Laittre declined as his business interests had suffered from his inattention while he was in office.

De Laittre was later named State Prison Inspector from 1879 to 1887. He was involved with the development and construction of Minneapolis City Hall and the Minnesota State Capitol buildings. He also remained part of the local business world, working with the Nicollet National Bank and the Farmers & Mechanics Savings Bank.

De Laittre died on September 19, 1912, at his home on West Franklin Avenue in Minneapolis. He was buried in Lakewood Cemetery.

== Electoral history ==
- Minneapolis Mayoral Election, 1877
  - John De Laittre 3,576
  - A. A. Ames 2,932

Political offices
Preceded by A. A. Ames	Mayor of Minneapolis; 1877 – 1878	Succeeded by Alonzo Cooper Rand
