= 34th Indiana Infantry Regiment =

34th Indiana Veteran Volunteer Infantry Regiment
- Flag of the United States, 1863-1865
- Active: September 16, 1861, to February 3, 1866
- Country: United States
- Allegiance: Union
- Branch: Infantry
- Engagements: Battle of Island Number Ten; Battle of Port Gibson; Battle of Champion Hill; Siege of Vicksburg; Battle of Palmito Ranch

Commanders
- Notable commanders: Colonel Robert A Cameron; Colonel Robert B. Jones; Lieutenant Colonel Robert G. Morrison

The 34th Indiana Veteran Volunteer Infantry Regiment, nicknamed The Morton Rifles, was an Infantry Regiment that served in the Union Army during the American Civil War. It had the distinction of fighting in the last land action of the war, the Battle of Palmito Ranch, Texas May 12–13, 1865, and also of suffering the last soldier killed during the war, Private John J. Williams.

== Service ==
Organized at Anderson, Indiana, and mustered into service on September 16, 1861. Moved to Jeffersonville, Indiana, October 10, 1861. To New Haven, Kentucky, November 15, and duty there until December 14, 1861. Moved to Camp Wicliffe, Kentucky, December 14, 1861, and duty there until February 7, 1862. Attached to 10th Brigade, Army of the Ohio, November–December 1861. Attached to 10th Brigade, 4th Division, Army of the Ohio, to February 1862. 1st Brigade, 2nd Division, Army of the Mississippi, to April 1862. 1st Brigade, 3d Division, Army of the Mississippi. Garrison at New Madrid, Missouri, to July 1862. Helena, Arkansas, District of Eastern Arkansas, Department of the Missouri, to November 1862. 3rd Brigade, 2nd Division, Department of Eastern Arkansas, Department of the Tennessee, to January 1863. 3rd Brigade, 12th Division, XIII Corps, Army of the Tennessee, to February 1863. 1st Brigade, 12th Division, XIII Corps, Army of the Tennessee, to August 1863. Department of the Gulf to March 1864. Defenses of New Orleans, Louisiana, to December 1864. Brazos Santiago, Texas, U.S. Forces, Texas, to June 1865. Department of Texas to February 1866.

== Detailed service ==
Moved to Green River, Kentucky, February 7, 1862, thence to the Ohio River, February 14, and to Cairo, Illinois, with Nelson's Division, Army of the Ohio, February 17–20. Detached from Division and moved to Commerce, Missouri, February 27-March 3. Siege of New Madrid, Missouri, March 5–14. Siege and capture of Island Number Ten, Mississippi River, March 15-April 8. Riddell's Point March 17. Garrison duty at New Madrid, Missouri, April 7 to June 14. Expedition down Mississippi River to Fort Pillow, Tennessee, May 19–23 (Detachment). Capture of Fort Pillow June 5 (Detachment). Moved to Memphis, Tenn., June 14–15. Expedition up White River, Ark., June 26-July 14. Action at Grand Prairie July 6–7. Near Duvall's Bluff July 7. Aberdeen July 9. Arrived at Helena July 14, and duty there until April, 1863. Expedition to Arkansas Post November 16–22, 1862. Ordered to Milliken's Bend, Louisiana, April 14. Movement on Bruinsburg and turning Grand Gulf April 25–30. Battle of Port Gibson May 1. Fourteen-Mile Creek May 12–13. Battle of Champion's Hill May 16. Siege of Vicksburg, Mississippi, May 18-July 4. Assaults on Vicksburg May 19 and 22. Advance on Jackson, Mississippi, July 4–10. Siege of Jackson July 10–17. Ordered to New Orleans, Louisiana, August 4, thence to Brashear City September 12. Western Louisiana Campaign October 3-November 30. Grand Coteau October 19. Carrion Crow Bayou November 3. At New Iberia until December 19. Regiment reenlisted at New Iberia December 15. Moved to Pass Cavallo, Texas, December 23, 1863 – January 8, 1864, and duty there until February 21. Moved to New Orleans, Louisiana, February 21, and duty there until March 20. Veterans on furlough until May. Garrison duty at New Orleans until December 18. Ordered to Brazos, Santiago, Texas, December 18, and duty there until June 16, 1865. Expedition from Brazos, Santiago, May 11–14, 1865. Action at the Battle of Palmito Ranch, May 12–13, 1865 (last action of the war). White's Ranch May 13. March to Ringgold Barracks, 260 miles up the Rio Grande June 16–28. Duty at Ringgold Barracks until July 24, and at Brownsville, Texas, until February, 1866. Mustered out February 3, 1866.

== Casualties ==
The Regiment lost during its service 2 Officers and 32 Enlisted men killed or mortally wounded, and 5 Officers and 204 Enlisted men who died of disease, for a total of 243.

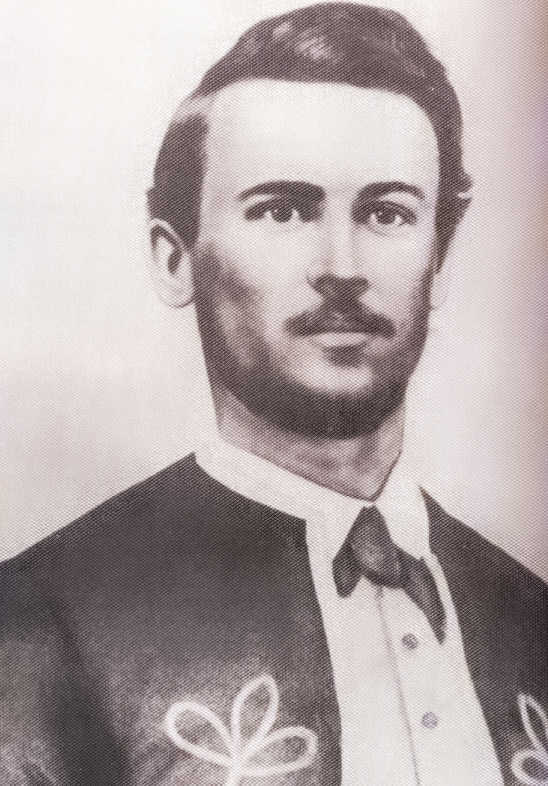
Private John J. Williams, Company B, 34th Indiana Volunteer Infantry, the last soldier killed during the American Civil War. His Zouave style jacket was worn by the veteran regiments of the XIII Corps, which chose a distinctive uniform jacket instead of a corps badge.

The last soldier killed during the American Civil War was Private John J. Williams, a member of Company B, 34th Indiana Volunteer Infantry. He was killed during the last land engagement of the war, the Battle of Palmito Ranch Texas, on May 13, 1865.

== Commanders ==
- Colonel Robert B. Jones
- Lieutenant Colonel Robert G. Morrison

== See also ==
- List of Indiana Civil War regiments
- Indiana in the Civil War
