= Garden Prairie, Illinois =

- CDP
- Location of Garden Prairie in Boone County, Illinois.
- Coordinates: 42°15′06″N 88°43′03″W
- Country: United States
- State: Illinois
- County: Boone
- Townships: Bonus

Area
  - Total: 0.65 sq mi (1.68 km^{2})
  - Land: 0.64 sq mi (1.65 km^{2})
  - Water: 0.012 sq mi (0.03 km^{2})
- Elevation: 781 ft (238 m)

Population (2020)
  - Total: 300
  - Density: 470.5/sq mi (181.67/km^{2})
- Time zone: UTC-6 (CST)
  - Summer (DST): UTC-5 (CDT)
- ZIP code: 61038
- Area codes: 815 and 779
- FIPS code: 17-28612
- GNIS feature ID: 2675242

Garden Prairie is an unincorporated former village and census-designated place located in Boone County, Illinois, United States. As of the 2020 census, Garden Prairie had a population of 300. It is part of the Rockford, Illinois Metropolitan Statistical Area.

== History ==
Garden Prairie was originally called Amesville, in honor of a pioneer settler. The present name refers to the fertility of their surrounding land on the prairie. A post office was established as Amesville in 1838, and renamed Garden Prairie in 1853.

On February 2, 2010, residents voted 57–46 to dissolve the village, only 2 years after incorporating by a 62 - 44 vote on February 5, 2008.

== Geography ==
According to the 2021 census gazetteer files, Garden Prairie has a total area of 0.65 square miles (1.68 km^{2}), of which 0.64 square miles (1.66 km^{2}) (or 98.15%) is land and 0.01 square miles (0.03 km^{2}) (or 1.85%) is water. It is roughly centered between Marengo and Belvidere, at the intersection of US Highway 20 and Garden Prairie Road.

== Demographics ==
Historical population
Census	Pop.	Note	%±
2010	352		—
2020	300		−14.8%
U.S. Decennial Census

=== Racial and ethnic composition ===
Garden Prairie CDP, Illinois – Racial and ethnic composition Note: the US Census treats Hispanic/Latino as an ethnic category. This table excludes Latinos from the racial categories and assigns them to a separate category. Hispanics/Latinos may be of any race.
Race / Ethnicity (NH = Non-Hispanic)	Pop 2010	Pop 2020	% 2010	% 2020
White alone (NH)	281	243	79.83%	81.00%
Black or African American alone (NH)	0	0	0.00%	0.00%
Native American or Alaska Native alone (NH)	2	1	0.57%	0.33%
Asian alone (NH)	0	2	0.00%	0.67%
Native Hawaiian or Pacific Islander alone (NH)	6	0	1.70%	0.00%
Other race alone (NH)	4	0	1.14%	0.00%
Mixed race or Multiracial (NH)	0	17	0.00%	5.67%
Hispanic or Latino (any race)	59	37	16.76%	12.33%
Total	352	300	100.00%	100.00%

=== 2020 census ===
As of the 2020 census there were 300 people, 118 households, and 66 families residing in the CDP. The population density was 461.54 inhabitants per square mile (178.20/km^{2}). There were 135 housing units at an average density of 207.69 per square mile (80.19/km^{2}). The racial makeup of the CDP was 85.00% White, 0.33% African American, 1.33% Native American, 0.67% Asian, 0.00% Pacific Islander, 1.33% from other races, and 11.33% from two or more races. Hispanic or Latino of any race were 12.33% of the population.

There were 118 households, out of which 32.2% had children under the age of 18 living with them, 23.73% were married couples living together, 32.20% had a female householder with no husband present, and 44.07% were non-families. 11.86% of all households were made up of individuals, and 0.00% had someone living alone who was 65 years of age or older. The average household size was 2.53 and the average family size was 2.25.

The CDP's age distribution consisted of 13.6% under the age of 18, 14.3% from 18 to 24, 5.3% from 25 to 44, 37.4% from 45 to 64, and 29.4% who were 65 years of age or older. The median age was 47.0 years. For every 100 females, there were 136.6 males. For every 100 females age 18 and over, there were 104.5 males.

== Education ==
It is in the Belvidere Consolidated Unit School District 100.
