= 1910 Minnesota gubernatorial election =

- November 8, 1910
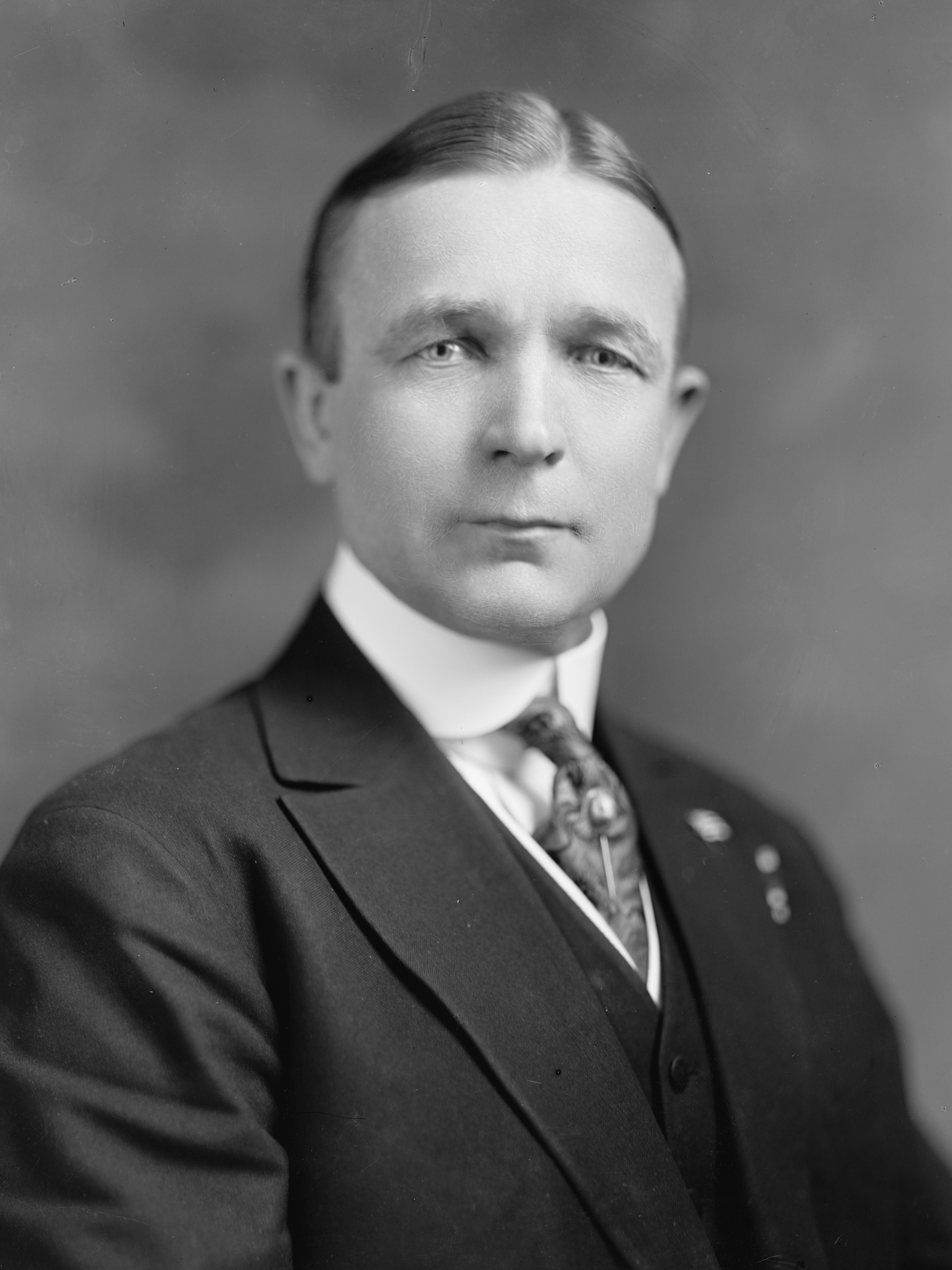

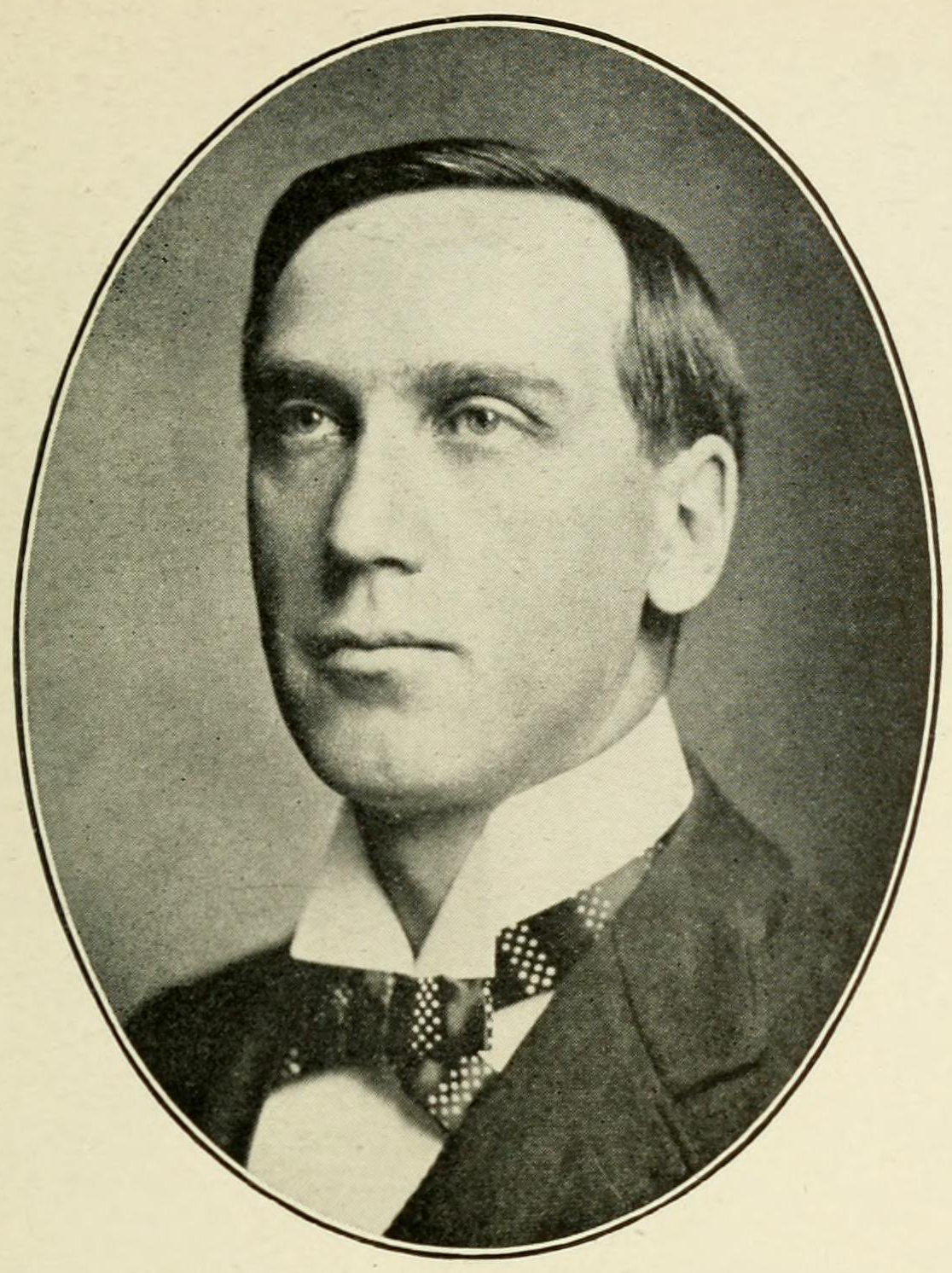
Nominee	Adolph Olson Eberhart	James Gray
Party	Republican	Democratic
Popular vote	164,185	103,779
Percentage	55.73%	35.23%
- County results Eberhart: 40–50% 50–60% 60–70%
Governor before election
Adolph Olson Eberhart
Republican
Elected Governor
Adolph Olson Eberhart
Republican

The 1910 Minnesota gubernatorial election took place on November 8, 1910. Republican incumbent Adolph Olson Eberhart defeated Democratic challenger James Gray. Eberhart was not running for a second term, but to be elected in his own right. He took office after his predecessor, John Albert Johnson, died in office.

This was the last gubernatorial election in Minnesota in which the conventions were closed, and primaries were held privately among party delegates.

== Candidates ==
- George E. Barrett, pastor (Public Ownership)
- Charles F. Brandborg, Farmers' Alliance state committee member (Socialist Labor)
- Adolph Olson Eberhart, incumbent (Republican)
- James Gray, former mayor of Minneapolis (Democrat)
- Jorgen F. Heiberg, miller (Prohibition)

== Campaigns ==
The Republican State Convention was held on June 17, 1910. Eberhart was nominated without any opposition.

The Democratic State Convention was held on September 14, 1910. John Lind, who was previously the governor and still extremely popular within the Democratic party, was asked to run. He declined. On September 9, 1910, Lind met with various party leaders, including Frank A. Day, and they decided to endorse James Gray for governor. This came as a surprise, considering he had never been mentioned as a potential candidate. At the convention, he was unanimously selected as the party's nominee.

Eberhart won the election in a landslide. He became the first candidate for governor to win every county in the state, an accomplishment only achieved two other times in the history of the state, in 1916 and 1974.

== Results ==
1910 gubernatorial election, Minnesota
Party	Candidate	Votes	%	±%
Republican	Adolph Olson Eberhart (incumbent)	164,185	55.73%	+11.85%
Democratic	James Gray	103,779	35.23%	−16.70%
Public Ownership	George E. Barrett	11,173	3.79%	+1.86%
Prohibition	J. F. Heiberg	8,959	3.04%	+0.96%
Socialist Labor	C. W. Brandborg	6,510	2.21%	n/a
Majority		60,406	20.50%	
Turnout		294,606		
Republican hold		Swing		

== See also ==
- List of Minnesota gubernatorial elections
