= 1896 Minnesota gubernatorial election =

- November 3, 1896
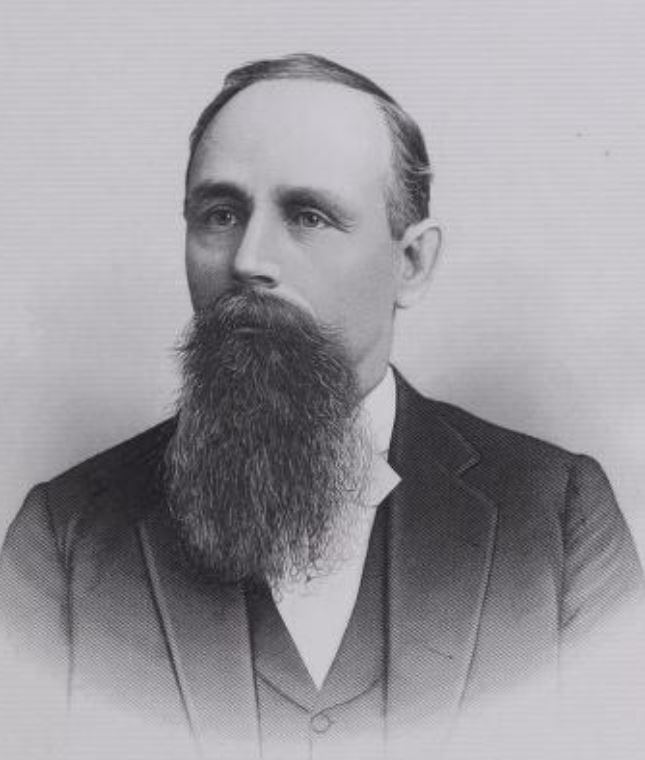

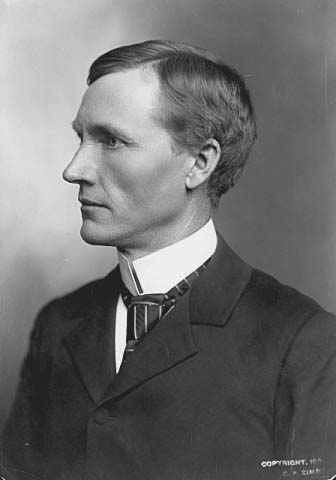
Nominee	David Marston Clough	John Lind
Party	Republican	Democratic
Alliance		People's Party
Popular vote	165,806	162,254
Percentage	49.17%	48.11%
- County results Clough: 40–50% 50–60% 60–70% 70–80% Lind: 40–50% 50–60% 60–70%
Governor before election
David Marston Clough
Republican
Elected Governor
David Marston Clough
Republican

The 1896 Minnesota gubernatorial election took place on November 3, 1896. Republican Party of Minnesota incumbent David Marston Clough narrowly defeated Democratic Party of Minnesota challenger John Lind. Lind later won the 1898 gubernatorial election and became the first Democrat elected to the office of governor of Minnesota since Henry Hastings Sibley left office in 1860. 1896 was the first of three successive elections in which Lind ran for governor at the head of a coalition consisting of the Democratic Party and the majority faction of the People's Party.

== Candidates ==
- A.A. Ames, former mayor of Minneapolis, Minnesota (Independent)
- David Marston Clough, incumbent (Republican)
- William J. Dean, Civil War veteran (Prohibition)
- William B. Hammond, secretary of the State Federation of Labor (Socialist Labor)
- John Lind, former representative from Minnesota's 2nd congressional district (Democratic, People's)

== Campaigns ==
In the Republican primary, incumbent Clough prevailed, with 40 delegates. In second place, with 33, was John L. Gibbs. Moses Clapp, Samuel Rinnah Van Sant, and William E. Lee each had fewer votes. William Henry Eustis also gained four delegates at end of voting.

On August 1, 1896, the Democratic State Convention was held. Populist John Lind was nominated without opposition. Previous conservative candidate Daniel W. Lawler was denounced by the convention, as the party now hoped for success running with, instead of against, the Populists.

Lind, jokingly nicknamed "Honest John" by Republicans, was accused by Republicans of collaborating with the County Commissioners of Brown County in 1881 to alter tax laws that would result in Lind being secretly personally enriched. No actual evidence to support this claim was ever brought forward.

== Results ==
1896 gubernatorial election, Minnesota
Party	Candidate	Votes	%	±%
Republican	David Marston Clough (incumbent)	165,806	49.17%	−0.77%
Democratic-People's	John Lind	162,254	48.11%	+30.02%
Prohibition	William J. Dean	5,154	1.53%	−0.77%
Independent	A. A. Ames	2,890	0.86%	n/a
Socialist Labor	William B. Hammond	1,125	0.33%	n/a
Majority		3,552	1.06%	
Turnout		337,229		
Republican hold		Swing		

== See also ==
- List of Minnesota gubernatorial elections
