= Popchips =

American snack brand

- Industry: Snack
- Founded: 2007; 19 years ago
- Founder: Patrick Turpin; Keith Belling
- Headquarters: Delaware, United States
- Owner: VSB OpCo, LLC
- Website: popchips.com

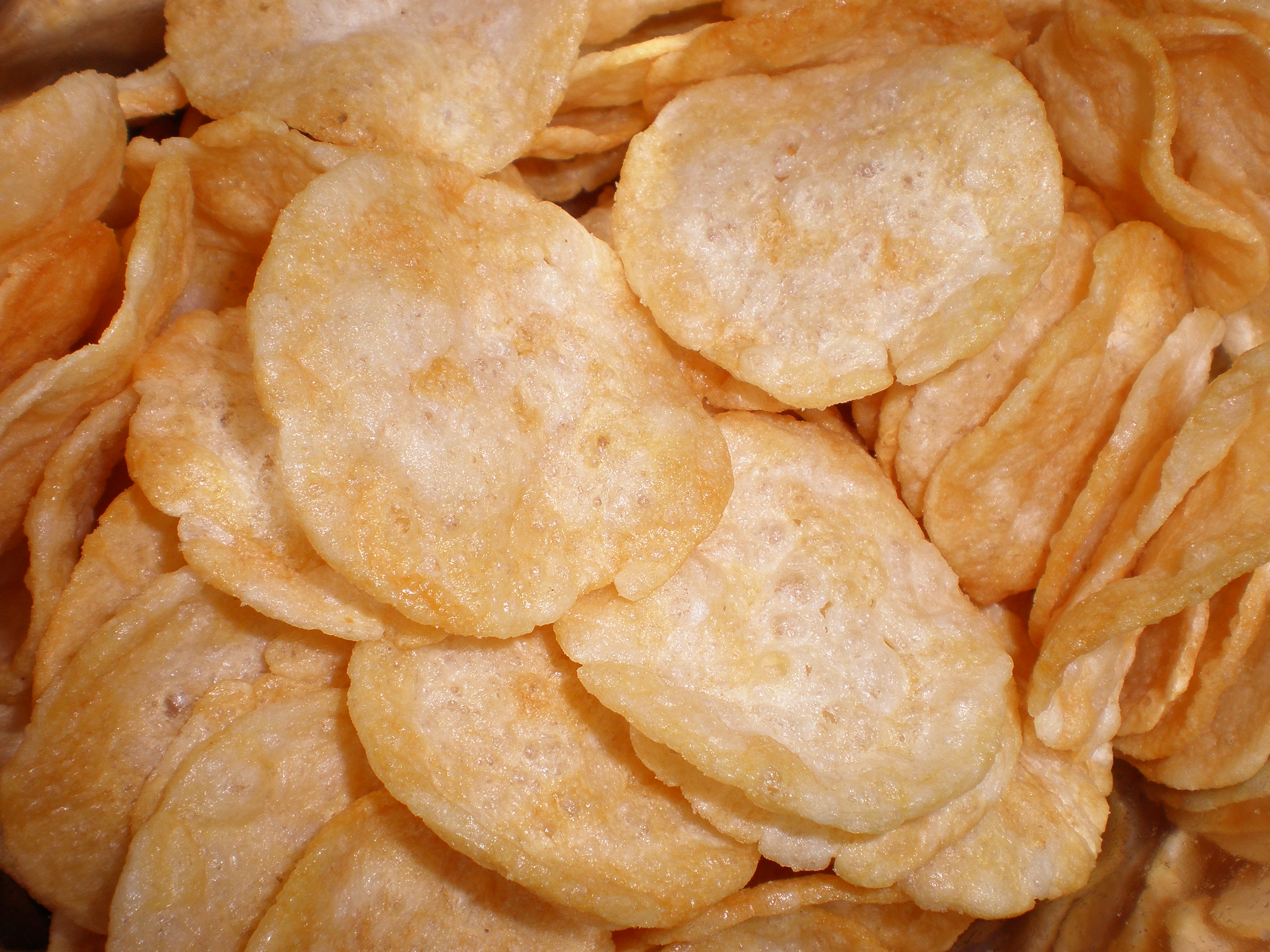
Original flavor Popchips

Popchips, stylized 'popchips' is an American brand of popped potato and corn products marketed as similar to potato chips. They are manufactured by processing potato starch at high pressure and temperature, in a process similar to that used for puffed rice cakes.

== History ==
Keith Belling is a co-founder and CEO of Popchips which was created in 2007. Belling teamed up with Patrick Turpin, and created a new popped chip. The company created a chip that utilizes potato and corn products that are cooked at a high pressure and temperature. Turpin co-founded Popchips, Inc., and serves as its President.

In November, 2015 David Ritterbush was named CEO of the company, replacing Paul Davis.

== Recognition ==
The company was rated by Forbes as among America's top 20 most promising companies in 2011. Forbes also reported that investors in the company included Ashton Kutcher, David Ortiz, Jillian Michaels, and Sean Combs.

== Ashton Kutcher controversy ==
Popchips received widespread criticism for their May 2012 video ad campaign featuring actor Ashton Kutcher. The campaign featured Kutcher as an Indian man 'looking for love' in a dating ad-style spoof. Kutcher's use of brown-face make up and a stereotypical Indian accent was deemed racially insensitive and offensive and received backlash from online viewers and members of the Indian-American community. The video was pulled and a spokesperson for Popchips stated that the dating parody was "created to provoke a few laughs and was never intended to stereotype or offend anyone".

== Celebrities ==
Ashton Kutcher was the first celebrity to endorse the company, with 13 million followers on Twitter. Kutcher boosted the publicity of Popchips. In 2012, Popchips also gained another celebrity endorser, Katy Perry. Since 2012, Perry featured in advertisements and also helped to launch her own flavour of Popchips, Katy's Kettle Corn.

== Awards ==
Since 2007, Popchips has won the following awards:

- Best Crispy Snack for Kids - IVillage
- Best Snack - Shape (magazine)
- Best Potato Chip - Men's Health (magazine)
- Outstanding Snack - sofi Awards
- Best Chips - Real Simple (magazine)
- Best Chips Under 100 Calories - Eat This, Not That (magazine)

One of the 8 Most Addicting Foods - Yahoo! Shine

- Best Low Calorie Snack - Good Housekeeping (magazine)
- Best Chips - Slash Food
- Best Crunchy Snack - Fitness (magazine)
- #1 Potato Chip - Kiwi (magazine)
- Best Chips - Health (magazine)

== Distribution ==
Popchips provides its snack through a network of retail stores including Target, Safeway, and Walgreens in the United States, Canada, United Kingdom, Ireland and also online.

== Products ==
Popchips are produced in a number of flavors in addition to the original flavor:

Potato

- Sea Salt
- Sour Cream & Onion
- Barbeque
- Sea Salt & Vinegar
- Thai Sweet Chilli
- Mature Cheddar & Onion

Potato Ridges

- Crazy Hot
- Buffalo Ranch
- Cheddar and Sour Cream

== Nutritional Information ==
- A share size bag of potato popchips (3 oz.) contain 120 calories per serving size (1 oz.).
- A share size bag of tortilla popchips (3.5 oz.) contain 120 calories per serving size (1 oz.).
- A share size bag of Katy's Kettle Corn popchips (3.5 oz.) contain 130 calories per serving size (1 oz.).
