= Leonard A. Rosing =

American politician (1861–1909)

Leonard August Rosing
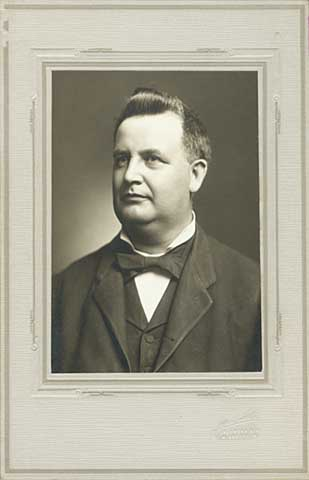
- Rosing in C.1905
- Born: August 29, 1861; Malmö, Sweden
- Died: April 14, 1909 (aged 47)
- Political party: Democratic
- Spouse: Mary Belle Season (m. 1886)

Leonard August Rosing (August 29, 1861 – April 14, 1909) was an American politician from the state of Minnesota.

Rosing was born in Malmö, Sweden in 1861. His family emigrated to the United States in 1869. His family settled on a farm near Cannon Falls.

Rosing took an interest in politics, and joined the Republican Party. As a progressive, he became dissatisfied with the more conservative elements of the Republicans that began to come into power over the 1880s. In 1890, he joined the Minnesota Democratic Party, and also supported the Populist Party.

Rosing became chair of the Democratic Party in 1896. In 1898, he was essential to the campaign and election of John Lind. Rosing would serve as Lind's personal secretary. He was the Democratic nominee for governor in 1902, but narrowly lost to incumbent Samuel Rinnah Van Sant. In 1904, he was a delegate to the 1904 Democratic National Convention. In 1905, he was appointed to the State Board of Control by Democratic governor John Albert Johnson.

Rosing, Minnesota is named after him.

Rosing died during brain surgery on April 14, 1909.

Party political offices
| Preceded by John Lind | Democratic nominee for Governor of Minnesota; 1902 | Succeeded by John Albert Johnson |
