= William Henry Eustis =

American politician (1845–1928)

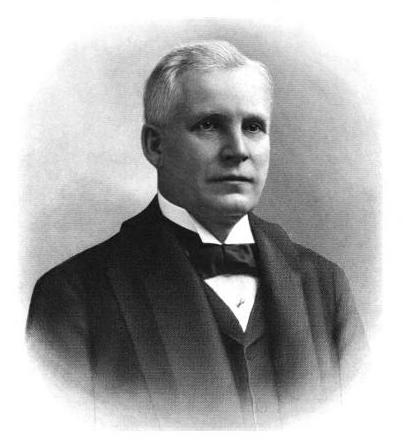
- Eustis c. 1904

17th Mayor of Minneapolis
- In office January 2, 1893 – January 7, 1895
- Preceded by: Philip B. Winston
- Succeeded by: Robert Pratt

Personal details
- Born: July 17, 1845 Oxbow, New York, U.S.
- Died: November 30, 1926 (aged 81) Minneapolis, Minnesota, U.S.
- Resting place: Lakewood Cemetery; 44°56′11″N 93°17′56″W
- Party: Republican
- Parents: Tobias Eustis (father); Mary Marwick (mother)
- Education: Bachelor of Laws
- Alma mater: Wesleyan University; Columbia Law School
- Profession: Attorney; Business magnate
- Known for: Philanthropist

William Henry Eustis (July 17, 1845 – November 30, 1928) was the 17th mayor of Minneapolis, Republican nominee for Governor of Minnesota in 1898, and a philanthropist.

== Biography ==
Eustis was born in Jefferson County, New York on July 17, 1845. When he was 15 years old, he contracted a hip disease, which required him to walk with a cane and then with crutches. Eustis graduated from Wesleyan University in Connecticut in 1873 and then got his law degree from Columbia Law School the next year. He moved to Minneapolis in 1881 and started dealing in real estate, becoming more well known as an owner of downtown buildings than as an attorney. He served as the mayor of Minneapolis for one term, 1893 through 1895.

He would run for governor twice. First in 1896, he failed to secure the nomination. In 1898 he would win the Republican primary, but lose the election itself.

In 1902, he was named a Special Commissioner to the Hawaiian Islands.

Later in life, he began to think about donating much of his wealth to charity, facetiously calling it "mostly unearned increment."

In 1923, he bought 65 acres (26 ha) of land on the west side of the Mississippi River and donated 21 acres (8.5 ha) to the Minneapolis School Board for the site of the Michael Dowling School, devoted to the education of handicapped children. He subsequently donated the remaining 44 acres (18 ha) of land, along with $900,000 in securities, to the University of Minnesota for a hospital and convalescent home. He did not want the hospital to bear his name, instead preferring it to be called the "Minnesota Hospital and Home for Crippled Children."

Eustis eventually donated his interest in the Flour Exchange Building and Corn Exchange Building to the university, along with the rental income. Hospital construction began on November 10, 1928, but by that time he was too ill to attend. Eustis died of heart disease on November 30, 1928. The hospital included an outpatient department, two floors of rooms for inpatient treatment, space for an on-site school, and an amphitheater for teaching purposes. The university eventually named the hospital after Eustis to recognize his generosity. He was buried in Lakewood Cemetery.

When the Mayo Memorial Building on campus was completed in 1954, the Eustis Hospital, along with Elliot Hospital, were incorporated into the structure.

== Electoral history ==
- Minneapolis Mayoral Election, 1892
  - William H. Eustis 17,910
  - James C. Haynes 15,728
  - Charles M. Way 1,842
  - Theodore F. Stark 1,665

Party political offices
Preceded by David Marston Clough	Republican nominee for Governor of Minnesota; 1898	Succeeded by Samuel Rinnah Van Sant
Political offices
Preceded by Philip B. Winston	Mayor of Minneapolis; 1893 – 1895	Succeeded by Robert Pratt
