= Edward C. Babb =

American politician (1834–1899)

Edward Charles Babb
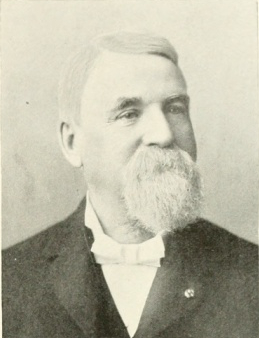
- Babb c. 1897

15th Mayor of Minneapolis
- In office January 7, 1889 – January 5, 1891
- Preceded by: A.A. Ames
- Succeeded by: Philip B. Winston

Member of the Minneapolis City Council from the 8th Ward
- In office 1885–1887

Personal details
- Born: February 1, 1834 Saccarappa, Maine
- Died: March 9, 1899 (aged 65) Minneapolis, Minnesota
- Resting place: Lakewood Cemetery; 44°56′11″N 93°17′56″W
- Party: Republican
- Spouse: Levee L. Chandler (1862-1899; his death)

Military service
- Allegiance: United States
- Branch/service: United States Army
- Years of service: 1862 – 1865
- Rank: Captain
- Commands: Company F, 9th New Hampshire Volunteer Infantry
- Battles/wars: American Civil War

Edward Charles Babb (February 1, 1834 – March 9, 1899) was an American Civil War veteran and businessman who served as the 15th mayor of Minneapolis.

== Life and career ==
Babb was born in Westbrook, Maine. After attending local schools and briefly working as a teacher and marble cutter he became involved in the lumber industry. In the American Civil War he served with the 9th New Hampshire Volunteer Infantry, serving in many important engagements and being promoted from private to captain over the course of the war. In 1868 he moved to Minneapolis, initially working in the lumber industry and later as president of the Cedar Lake Ice Company. In 1888 he was elected mayor of Minneapolis as a Republican, serving one term from 1889 to 1891. Babb died in Minneapolis on March 9, 1899. He is buried in Lakewood Cemetery in Minneapolis.

== Electoral history ==
- Minneapolis Mayoral Election, 1888
  - Edward Charles Babb 17,882
  - Philip Bickerton Winston 14,759
  - William J. Dean 1,365
  - Baldwin Brown 2
  - Hugh Galbraith Harrison 1
  - Write-Ins and Scattering 1

Political offices
Preceded by A. A. Ames	Mayor of Minneapolis; 1889 – 1891	Succeeded by Philip B. Winston
