= Philip B. Winston =

American businessman and politician (1845–1901)

1st Lieutenant Philip Bickerton Winston
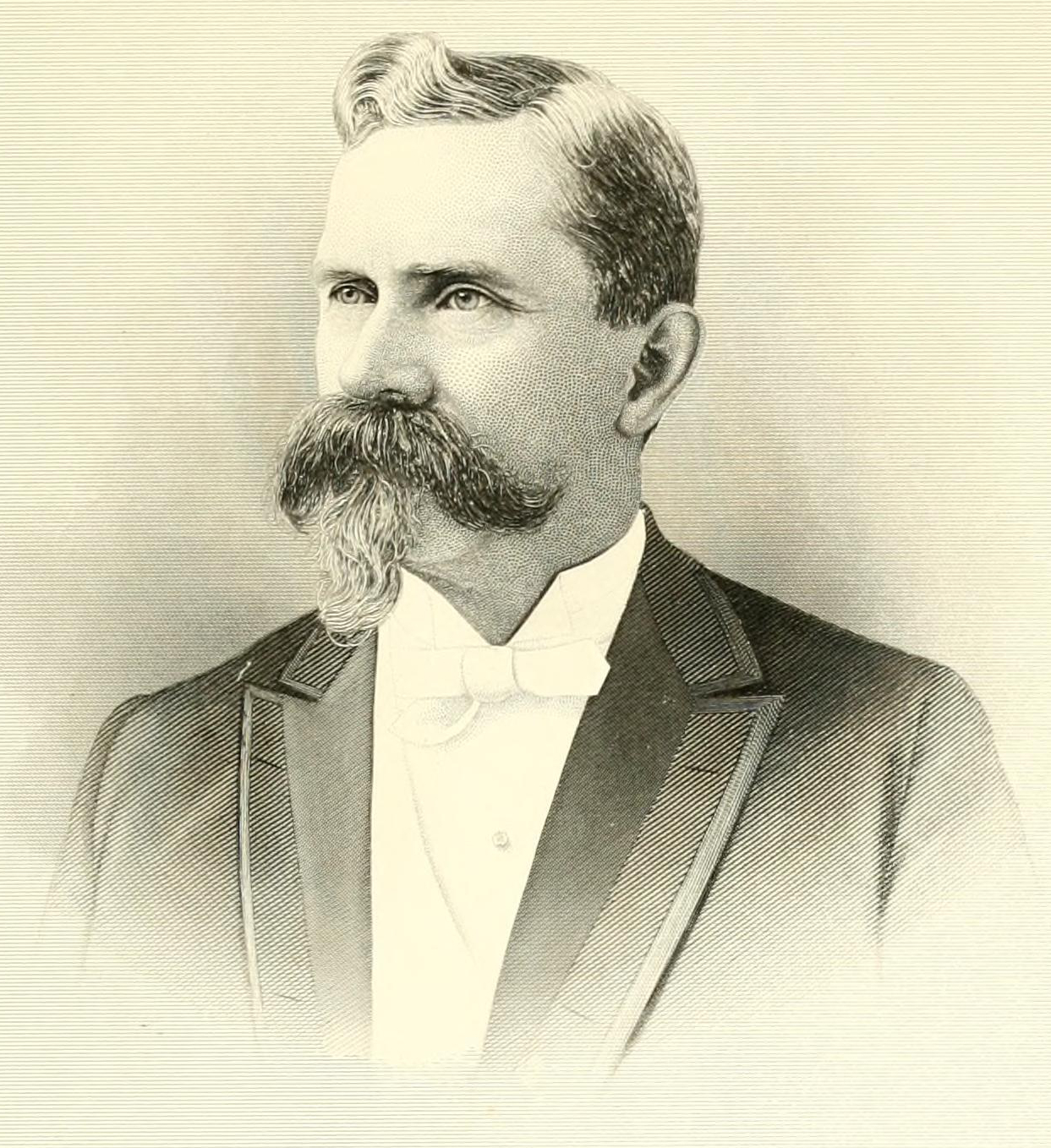
- Winston c. 1893

Member of the Minnesota House of Representatives from the 41st District
- In office January 2, 1899 – January 7, 1901 Serving with John Albert Hagstrom, Samuel Vance Morris, and Hans Simonson
- Preceded by: District redrawn
- Succeeded by: Joseph L. Dobbin, Samuel Vance Morris, Loran Charles Stevenson, and William Drew Washburn Jr.

Member of the Minnesota House of Representatives from the 32nd District
- In office January 3, 1893 – January 7, 1895 Serving with Carl Albert Carlson, George Henry Fletcher, and John E. Holmberg
- Preceded by: August B. Darelius, James Smith, William H. Tripp, and Matthew Walsh
- Succeeded by: John F. Dahl, Thomas Downs, Christopher Ellingson, and Edward B. Zier

16th Mayor of Minneapolis
- In office January 5, 1891 – January 2, 1893
- Preceded by: Edward C. Babb
- Succeeded by: William H. Eustis

Personal details
- Born: August 12, 1845 Hanover County, Virginia
- Died: July 1, 1901 (aged 55) Chicago, Illinois
- Party: Democratic
- Spouse: Katherine Deborah Stevens
- Children: 2
- Parents: William O. Winston (father); Sarah A. Gregory (mother)
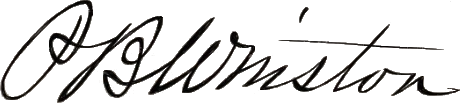
- Signature

Military service
- Allegiance: Confederate States
- Branch/service: Confederate States Army
- Years of service: 1862 – 1865
- Rank: 1st Lieutenant
- Unit: 5th Virginia Cavalry
- Battles/wars: American Civil War

Philip Bickerton Winston (August 12, 1845 – July 1, 1901) was an American Civil War veteran who fought for the Confederate States of America and a businessman who served as the 16th mayor of Minneapolis.

== Life and career ==
Winston was born near Hanover Courthouse, Virginia to William O. Winston and Sarah A. Gregory. At the outbreak of the American Civil War he enlisted in the 5th Virginia Cavalry and was eventually promoted to an aide under General Thomas L. Rosser. After the war ended, Winston pursued a farming career for a number of years before moving to Minneapolis in 1872. He found work with the Northern Pacific Railroad and eventually founded a contracting company with his brother F. G. Winston which helped in railroad construction projects across the Midwest.

In 1888 he was nominated by the Democratic party to run for mayor of Minneapolis but lost the election to Edward C. Babb. In 1890 he ran again and was successful, serving one term from 1891 to 1893. He also served two terms in the Minnesota House of Representatives from 1893 to 1895 and from 1899 to 1901.

Winston died in Chicago, Illinois on July 1, 1901. He is buried in his family's private cemetery in Hanover County, Virginia.

== Electoral history ==
- Minneapolis Mayoral Election, 1888
  - Edward Charles Babb 17,882
  - Philip Bickerton Winston 14,759
  - William J. Dean 1,365
  - Baldwin Brown 2
  - Hugh Galbraith Harrison 1
  - Write-Ins and Scattering 1
- Minneapolis Mayoral Election, 1890
  - Philip Bickerton Winston 17,200
  - Edwin G. Potter 11,000
  - Edwin Phillips 1,251
  - Ernest F. Clark 973

Political offices
Preceded by Edward C. Babb	Mayor of Minneapolis; 1891 – 1893	Succeeded by William H. Eustis
