= Puffed rice =

Types of puffed grain made from rice

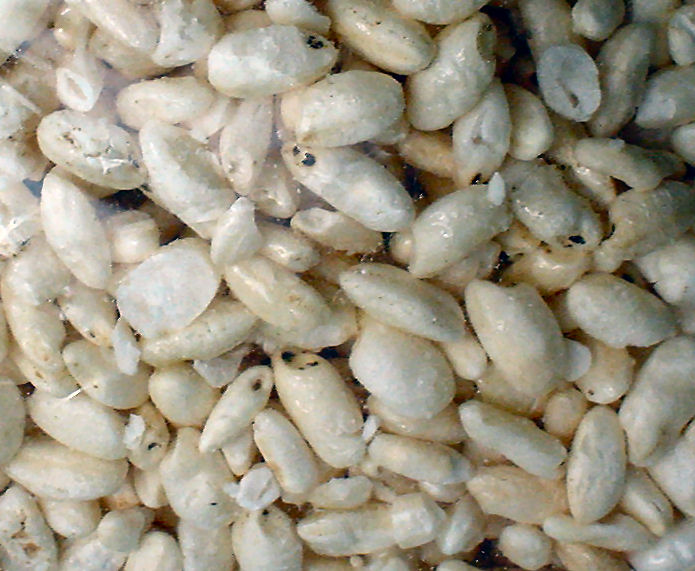
Puffed rice grains

Puffed rice, also called popped rice or pop rice, is a type of puffed grain made from rice that is expanded through heat and pressure, and commonly eaten in the traditional cuisines of Southeast Asia, East Asia, and South Asia. It has also been produced commercially in the West since 1904, particularly as an ingredient in breakfast cereals and other processed foods.

Traditional methods to puff or pop rice include frying in oil or salt. Commercial puffed rice is usually made by heating rice kernels under high pressure in the presence of steam, though the method of manufacture varies widely. They are either eaten as loose grains or made into puffed rice cakes.

Commercial popped rice was developed by American botanist and inventor Alexander P. Anderson while he was ascertaining the moisture content of starch granules.

== Description ==
While the terms "puffed rice" and "popped rice" are used interchangeably, they are properly different processes. Puffed rice refers to pre-gelatinized rice grains (either by being parboiled, boiled, or soaked) that are puffed by the rapid expansion of steam upon cooking. Puffed rice retains the shape of the rice grain, but is much larger. Popped rice, on the other hand, refers to rice grains where the hull or the bran is intact. When cooked, the kernel explodes through the hard outer covering due to heating. Popped rice has an irregular shape similar to popcorn. There are various methods, both modern and traditional, for making puffed and popped rice.

== Traditional versions by region ==
=== East Asia ===
Puffed rice or other grains are occasionally found as street food in China (called "mixiang" 米香), Taiwan (called "bí-phang" 米芳), Korea (called "ppeong twigi" 뻥튀기), and Japan (called "pon gashi" ポン菓子), where hawkers implement the puffing process using an integrated pushcart/puffer featuring a rotating steel pressure chamber heated over an open flame. The great booming sound produced by the release of pressure serves as advertising.

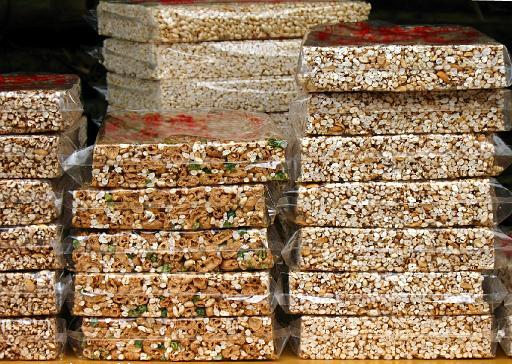
Puffed rice cakes in China

==== China ====
The earliest mention of puffed rice in China is in Zhejiang Province, from a book by Fan Chengda written in the Song dynasty (c. 1100). It was part of the rituals of the Spring Festival and was made in large cooking pots known as fǔ (釜) which was heated with wood-fire. Puffed rice, known as bào chǎo mǐ huā lou (爆炒米花), is still a traditional street food in Shanghai where it is made by frying rice in oil and sugar.

==== Japan ====
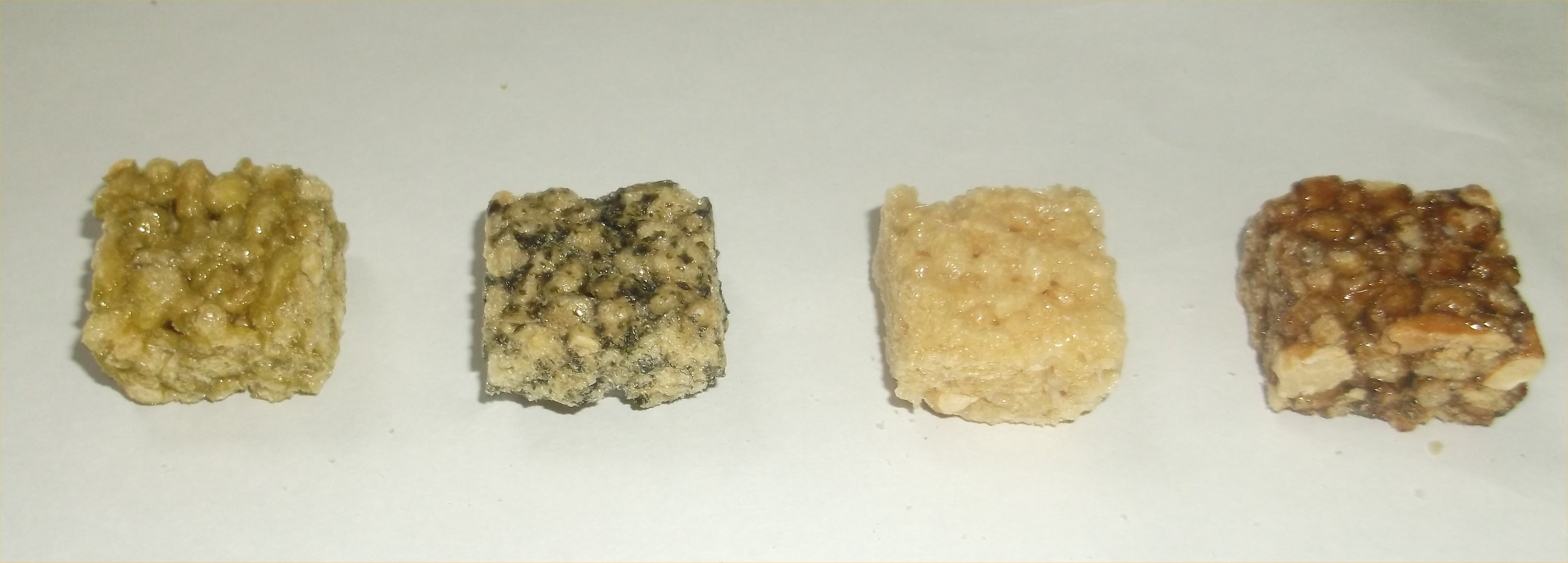
Various types of kaminari-okoshi from Japan

Traditional puffed rice cakes in Japanese cuisine are known as kaminari-okoshi (雷粔籹) "thunder cakes" or simply okoshi (おこし). In Edo Japan, the name okoshi was related to good luck, as the similar word okosu means to establish or set up. It is made by deep-frying sun-dried rice grains until they pop. It is then mixed with syrup (and other ingredients like peanuts or sesame seeds), pressed into trays, and dried. They are cut up into squarish or rectangular blocks before being sold. Traditional okoshi boxes feature images of Raijin, the Japanese god of thunder and lightning. Its earliest attestation was during the middle of the Edo period, when it was sold as a snack outside the Sensō-ji temple of Asakusa, Tokyo. Modern okoshi can use a variety of other ingredients and flavors and are usually factory-made.

Another type of Japanese puffed rice snack is ninjin (にんじん), which are loose puffed rice grains. Its name literally means "carrot" because it is sold in a carrot-shaped cone.

Puffed rice is also used in genmaicha (玄米茶), "brown rice tea", a traditional Japanese tea beverage consisting of green tea mixed with roasted puffed brown rice.

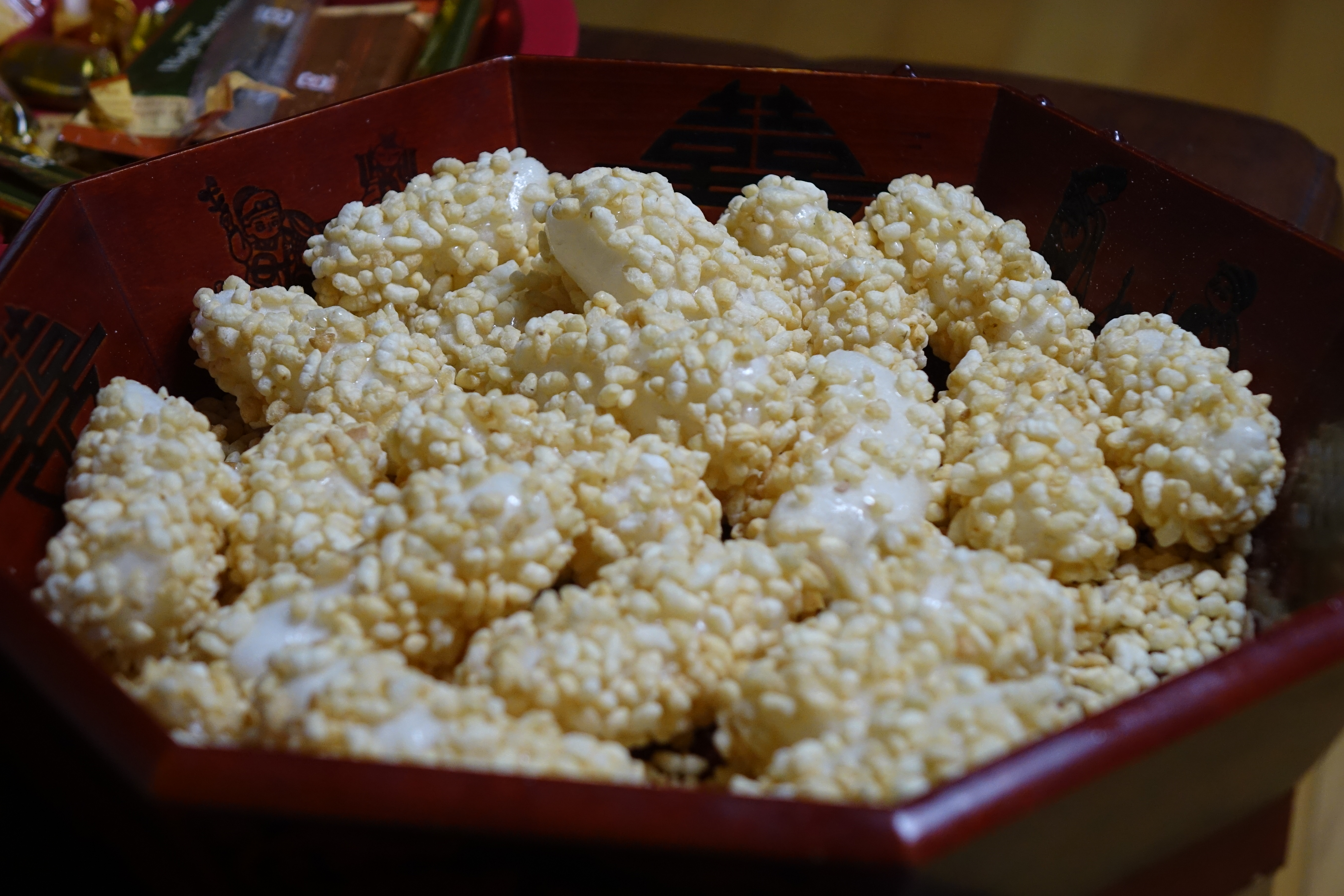
Gangjeong from South Korea coated with puffed rice

==== Korea ====
In Korean cuisine, puffed rice is known as twibap (튀밥) and is used to make yeot-gangjeong or to coat gangjeong.

Korea also has a tea beverage made with puffed rice called hyeonmi-nokcha (현미녹차, literally "brown rice green tea"), which is made with green tea and roasted puffed brown rice.

==== Taiwan ====
In Taiwanese cuisine, puffed rice is known as Bí-phang or pōng-bí-phang (磅米芳, the word "pōng" is the sound of the explosion when the pressure furnace is opened) in Taiwanese and Mi-hsiang (米香) in Mandarin. This snack gained popularity during the post-war period, especially in the 1950s and 1960s, when mobile puffed rice vendors were common sights in Taiwanese neighbourhoods. These vendors would travel with portable puffing machines and prepare the snack on the spot, attracting children with the dramatic sound and the distinctive aroma of toasted rice.

In recent years, Taiwan’s traditional puffed rice, which was once found only in classic peanut-flavoured versions, has undergone a modern revival across the country. In Keelung, a puffed rice shop has reinvented its product line by introducing over twenty new sweet and savoury flavours. These include coffee, cranberry, seafood, and sakura shrimp varieties, wrapped in packaging that earned its place among Keelung’s top ten souvenir gifts—especially popular with wedding banquets.

=== Southeast Asia ===
==== Philippines ====
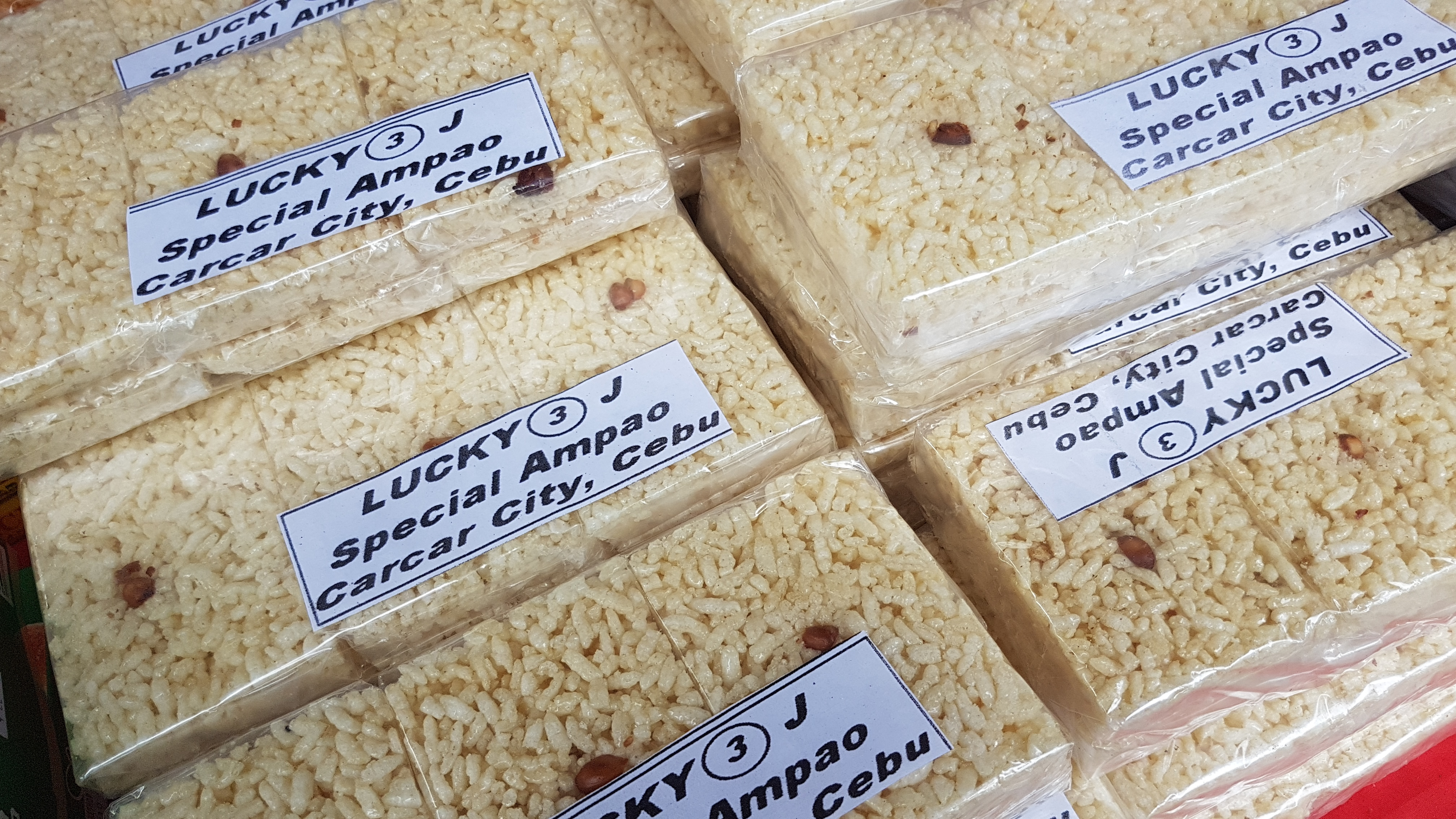
Ampaw from the Philippines

In Filipino cuisine, traditional puffed rice is known as ampaw or ampao (a term which also became applied to popcorn). It is made with cooked white rice (usually leftovers), which is dried in the sun for around four hours, then fried in hot oil to make it puff up: the oil is drained thoroughly after frying. The sugar glazing is cooked separately using muscovado sugar or molasses (or corn syrup), salt, butter, and vinegar or calamansi juice. The glazing is poured onto the puffed rice and mixed until the grains are evenly coated. It is then allowed to cool and shaped into the desired form before it fully hardens. They are usually cut into square or rectangular blocks or molded into balls.

==== Thailand ====
In Thai cuisine, a traditional popped rice snack is krayasaat (กระยาสารท). It is associated with the Buddhist Saat festival, which is celebrated in autumn. It can be made with regular rice or glutinous rice. It is roasted directly in a dry pan like popcorn until it pops, then it is mixed with caramelized palm sugar, coconut milk, peanuts, sesame seeds, and khao mao (pounded green rice).

==== Malaysia ====
In Malay cuisine, traditional puffed rice is known as bepang pulut, especially in Terengganu state. Glutinous rice is dried under sunlight and cooked with palm sugar. It is different from regular bepang which uses ground nuts instead of glutinous rice. Bepang pulut is famous as a gift from the host to guests at a wedding ceremony.

In Iban cuisine, parched glutinous rice, which is known as rendai, is toasted in a hot wok or pan without adding oil in it until it "pops" or puffs, similar to how popcorn is made. It is traditionally served for the Miring ceremony, which is a ritual to appease the petara (gods) and spirits for prosperity, health and protection.

=== South Asia ===
==== Nepal ====
Puffed Rice is a popular snack in Nepal where it is known as "Bhuja"-भुजा. It is used in a wide variety of recipes, from simply eating it directly to making other dishes. Some people also refer to rice as bhuja which can cause some confusion.

==== India ====
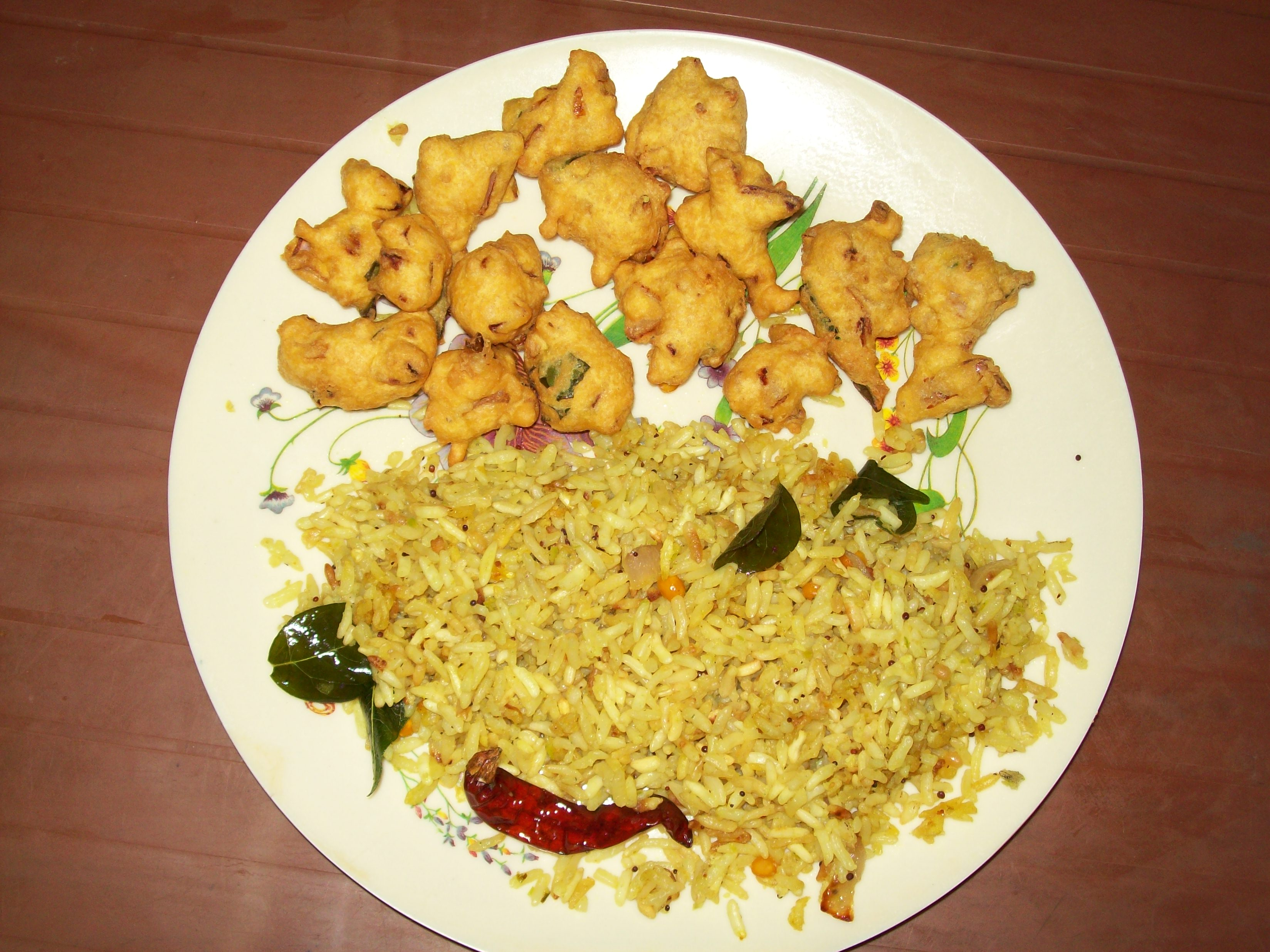
Uggani and bajji (steamed puffed rice and fritters), a typical breakfast of Rayalaseema.

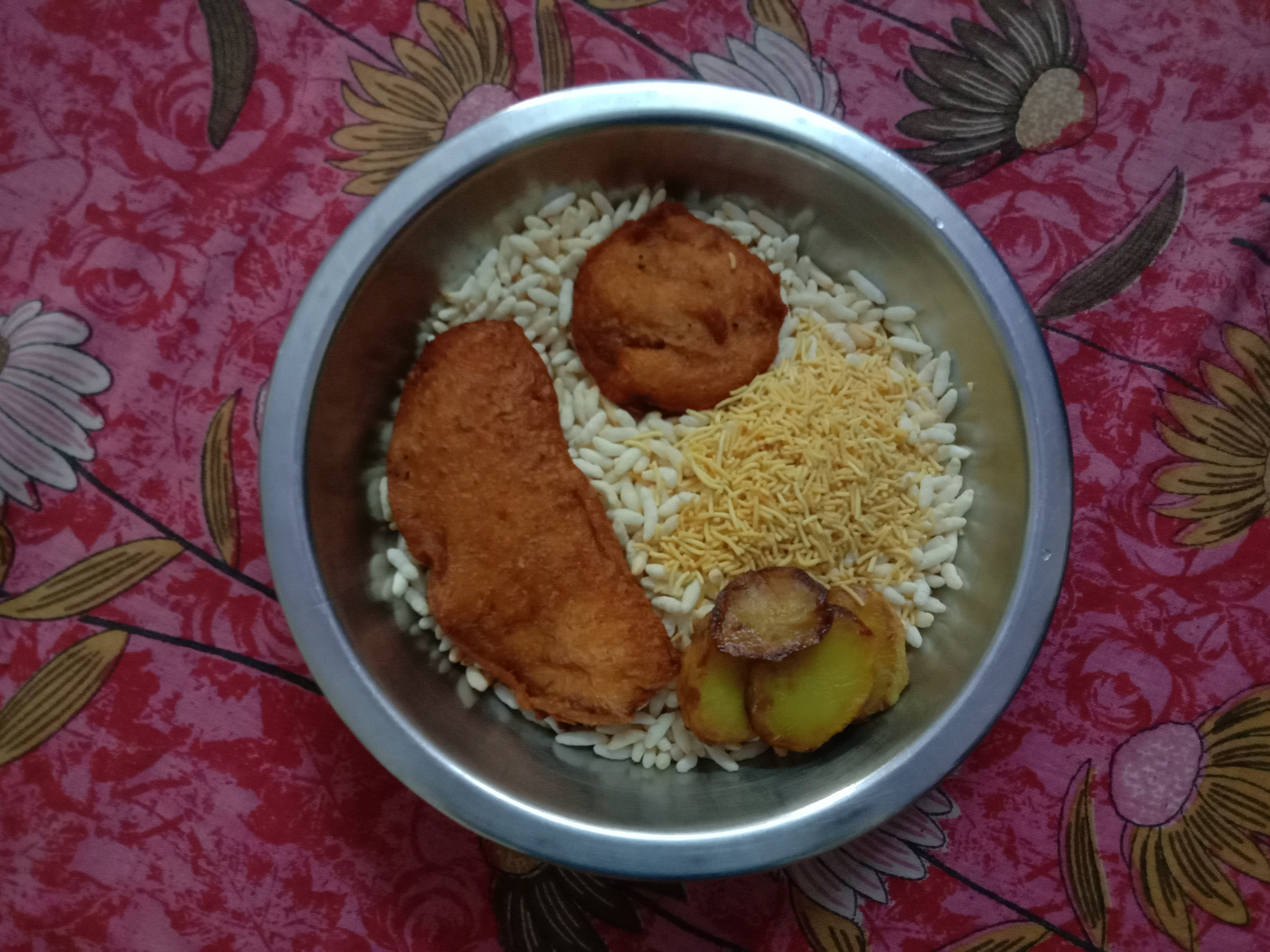
Puffed rice with Telebhaja (Bengali fritters), and potato fries in West Bengal.

In India, puffed rice is known by many regional names, which include murmura in Hindi (मुरमुरा), pura in Punjabi (ਪੁੜਾ), mamra in Gujrati (મમરા), kurmura in Marathi (कुरमुरा), charmbura in Konkani (चर्मबुरा), muri in Bangla (মুড়ি), mudhi in Odia (ମୁଢ଼ି), muri in Assamese (মুৰি), pori in Tamil (பொரி), pori in Malayalam (പൊരി), mandakki in Kannada (ಮಂಡಕ್ಕಿ), kurlari in Tulu (ಕುರ್ಲರಿ), borugulu in Telugu (బొరుగులు). It is a staple food in Bihar, Odisha, West Bengal, Andhra Pradesh, and Telangana.

It has been made since ancient times using a technique called hot salt frying, in which parboiled rice (i.e. steamed and then dried) is puffed by preheated salt. Salt is heated in a pan until it is hot enough to pop the rice added to it within seconds. Parboiled or dried pre-cooked rice is added to the heated contents of the pan and stirred. Puffing starts almost immediately and completes in less than a minute, and the rice is scooped out by a sieve.

Puffed rice is an ingredient of bhel puri, a popular Indian chaat (snack). It is offered to Hindu gods and goddesses in all pujas in the southern Indian states of Kerala and Tamil Nadu. Pilgrims of Sabarimala Temple often pack puffed rice in their travel pouch along with jaggery meant to be offered to the deity Ayyappan.

Pori has been mentioned in various Tamil texts as an offering to Hindu deities. Offerings of pori and jaggery made to Ganesha are mentioned in the Tiruppukal, a 15th-century anthology of Tamil religious songs, written by Tamil poet Arunagirinathar.

In Gujarati cuisine, it is called "mamra" and is often used to make a dry snack by shallow frying in oil with spices or made into sweet balls using jaggery and ghee.

In Telangana, as a snack typically given to children, puffed rice or borugulu is made into a ball with jaggery sugar syrup or bellam pakam.

In Karnataka, puffed rice is mixed with carrots, tomatoes, spices and coriander leaves to make churumuri, a popular evening snack.

Under the initiative of Make in India, the Central Government of India decided that mudhi from Odisha would be part of Indian traditional food, among 12 traditional dishes from different states, that would be launched globally.

In the Mithila and Bengal areas, puffed rice is had with "kachari"-fried potato/onion chops, fried fish or with mutton curry. "Jhal-muri" and "Murhi-Bhuja" are also very popular snacks in this area. In Madhya Pradesh, this is referred to as "Parmal", and it is very often eaten with Sev as a snack and also used in Bhel. In some areas, it is also known as "laai", and dishes made from it are called sweet laai, laai poha, etc.

==== Bangladesh ====
Puffed Rice called Muri in Bengali is a popular snack in Bangladesh. Mostly used to make Jhalmuri, it is the most common and cheapest snack in Bangladesh. They use the same ancient method as India to prepare the puffed rice. This snack can be found anywhere in Bangladesh. In Old Dhaka, the jhalmuri-wala (Jhalmuri-seller) is still often seen dressed in colourful clothes, wearing anklet bells and calling out to the residents. Puffed rice is also mixed with jaggery and shaped into a rounded ball snack called murir moa.

=== Rest of the world ===
==== Czech Republic and Slovakia ====
In 1960s Czechoslovakia, state firm Vitana was the first to begin the production of "expanded rice" as a plain flavoured or sweetened snack. The product became popular under the names burizony (Czech: burisony) or arizonky. These continue to be produced to this day in Pardubice or Sereď.

==== United States and Europe ====
In the United States and Europe, puffed rice is typically served with milk as a breakfast cereal; although, some chocolate bars include puffed rice, and puffed rice cakes are sold as low-calorie snacks.

== Modern commercial production ==
=== Puffed rice cereal ===
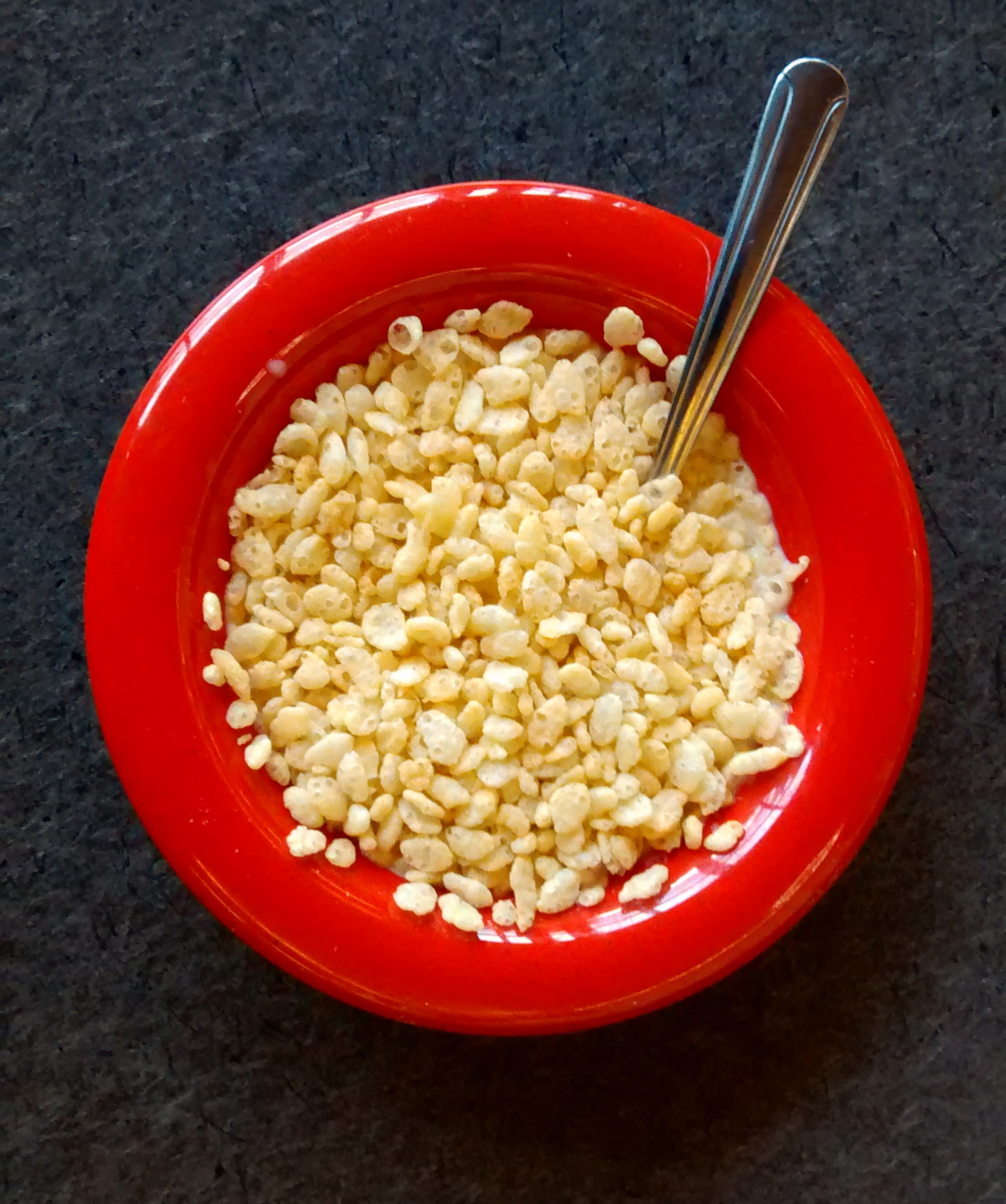
A bowl of Rice Krispies

Puffed rice is formed by the reaction of both starch and moisture when heated within the shell of the grain. Unlike corn, rice kernels are naturally lacking in moisture and must first be conditioned with steam. Puffed rice can be created by heating the steam-conditioned kernels either with oil or in an oven. Rice puffed in this way is crisp and known as "crisped rice". Oven-crisped rice is used to produce the Rice Krispies breakfast cereal, as well as the crisped rice used in Lion Bars, Nestlé Crunch, Krackel, and similar chocolate bars. Though not as dramatic a change when compared to popcorn, the process and result are the same.

Another method of puffing rice is "gun puffing", where the grain is conditioned to the correct level of moisture and pressurized to around 200 psi (1,400 kPa). When the pressure is suddenly released, the pressure stored inside the kernel causes it to puff out. This method produces a puffed rice which is spongy in texture.

Rice can also be puffed by making a rice dough and extruding small pellets, which are then rapidly heated. The moisture in the dough flash boils and puffs the rice up. A cereal such as Cap'n Crunch is extruded, cooked, cut, pressurized, puffed and dried in a continuous process.

The method of modern industrial puffed rice production is attributed to American inventor Alexander P. Anderson, who stumbled across puffing while trying to ascertain the water content of a single granule of starch. In 1904, Anderson introduced the first puffing machine at the World's Fair in St. Louis, Missouri; his eight "guns" that puffed grains for Fair goers were dubbed "The Eighth Wonder of the World" by an advertising billboard poster. Once the puffing principle, technique, and technology had been discovered by Anderson, the competition to puff ready-to-eat American breakfast cereal took over the economy of Battle Creek, Michigan, with Kellogg's and Quaker Oats being two still-active names to endure through the early puffing frenzy.

=== Puffed rice cakes ===
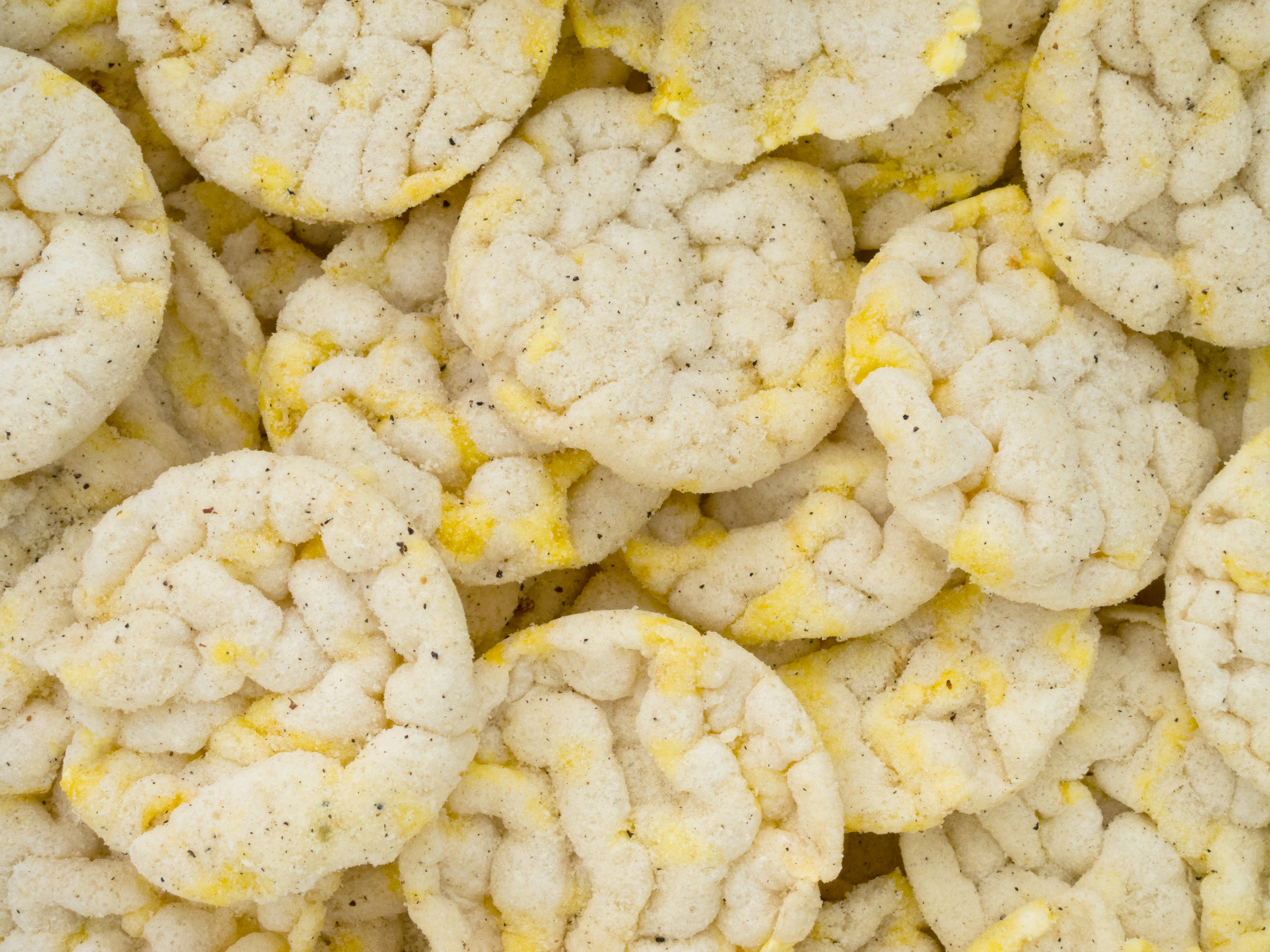
American puffed rice cakes

In the United States, a flat disk of puffed rice was sold as "rice cakes" by the company Chico-San in the 1970s. These rice cakes were marketed as low-calorie "saucers" meant to be eaten with toppings like cottage cheese, jelly, and fruit. Chico-San was eventually acquired by Heinz in 1984, at which time the Quaker Oats Company also developed their own rice cake marketed as a "low-carb alternative to bread". Rice cakes became a fad diet in the 1980s and 1990s in the United States. In 1993, Quaker Oats Company also acquired Chico-San, their biggest competitor, from Heinz. Rice cakes are also produced by other companies, including Lundberg Family Farms, Hain Celestial Group, and Whole Foods Market.

These puffed rice cakes are typically sold plain or blandly-seasoned, with the most popular flavor being lightly salted. They are also sold in flavored versions, including caramel, chocolate, cinnamon toast. They are popularly disk-shaped, but can also be sold as squares.

In the Netherlands, disk-shaped puffed rice cakes are commonly sold in cylindrical packaging in supermarkets. Puffed rice cakes are also sold in a variety of different flavors within Sweden.

== See also ==
- Puffed grain
- Flattened rice
