= Robert Pratt (mayor) =

American educator and politician (1845–1908)

Captain Robert Pratt
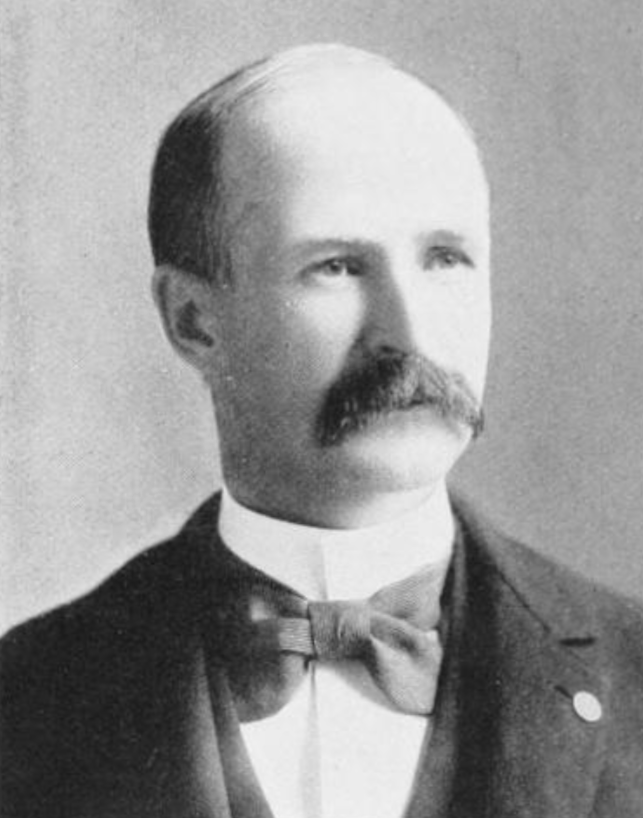
- Pratt in 1897

18th Mayor of Minneapolis
- In office January 7, 1895 – January 2, 1899
- Preceded by: William H. Eustis
- Succeeded by: James Gray

Personal details
- Born: December 12, 1845 Brandon, Vermont, U.S.
- Died: August 8, 1908 (aged 62) Minneapolis, Minnesota, U.S.
- Resting place: Lakewood Cemetery; 44°56′11″N 93°17′56″W
- Party: Republican
- Spouse: Irene D. Lamoneaux (m. 1871; died 1901)
- Children: 7
- Parents: Sidney Wright Pratt (father); Sarah Harkness (mother)
- Profession: Educator

Military service
- Allegiance: United States
- Branch/service: United States Army
- Years of service: 1861 – 1865
- Rank: Captain
- Commands: Company F, 5th VVI
- Battles/wars: American Civil War

Robert Pratt (December 12, 1845 – August 8, 1908) was an educator and the 18th mayor of Minneapolis. Pratt was born in Brandon, Vermont in 1845. During the American Civil War he served with the 5th Vermont Infantry. Shortly after the war, he relocated to Minneapolis, Minnesota where he served as an alderman, member of the park board, and longtime member of the Board of Education. He was also elected mayor in 1894 and re-elected in 1896. Pratt died on August 8, 1908. He is buried in Lakewood Cemetery in Minneapolis.

Pratt School in the Prospect Park neighborhood of Minneapolis is named after his son, Sidney Pratt, who was killed in the Spanish–American War.

== Electoral history ==
- Minneapolis Mayoral Election, 1894
  - Robert Pratt 19,666
  - Louis R. Thian 15,343
  - Henry J.O. Reed 4,325
  - Robert H. Hasty 512
- Minneapolis Mayoral Election, 1896
  - Robert Pratt 25,401
  - Alexander Thompson Ankeny 16,610
  - Milton O. Nelson 821
  - Elbert E. Stevens 591

Political offices
Preceded by William H. Eustis	Mayor of Minneapolis; 1895 – 1899	Succeeded by James Gray
