= Loren W. Collins =

American judge

Loren Collins
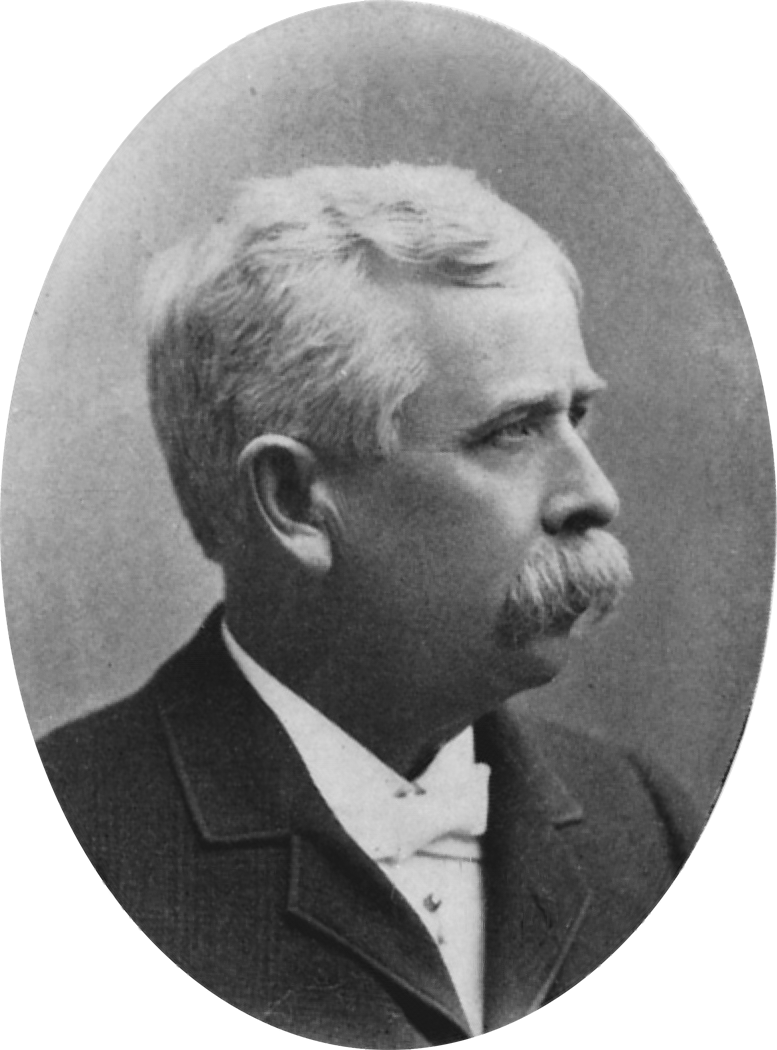

Associate Justice of the Minnesota Supreme Court
- In office 1887–1904

Member of the Minnesota House of Representatives
- In office 1881–1885

Personal details
- Born: Loren Warren Collins; August 7, 1838 Lowell, Massachusetts, U.S.
- Died: September 27, 1912 (aged 74) Minneapolis, Minnesota, U.S.

Military service
- Unit: 7th Minnesota Infantry Regiment
- Battles/wars: American Civil War

Loren Warren "L.W." Collins (August 7, 1838 – September 27, 1912) was an American jurist and politician.

== Early life and education ==
Born in Lowell, Massachusetts, Collins moved with his family to Eden Prairie, Minnesota Territory, in 1853. He studied law in Hastings, Minnesota.

== Career ==
Collins served in the 7th Minnesota Infantry Regiment during the American Civil War and practiced law in St. Cloud, Minnesota. He served as mayor of St. Cloud and as county attorney for Stearns County, Minnesota. Collins served in the Minnesota House of Representatives from 1881 to 1885. He then served as a Minnesota District Court judge from 1885 to 1887. Collins served on the Minnesota Supreme Court from 1887 until his resignation in 1904. Collins was an unsuccessful candidate in the 1898 and 1904 Minnesota gubernatorial election. In neither election did he win the republican primary.

== Personal life ==
Collins died at his home in Minneapolis, Minnesota.
