= Alexander P. Anderson =

US botanist and inventor

Anderson with the tubes he used to make puffed grains, 1933

Alexander Pierce Anderson (November 23, 1862 – May 7, 1943) was an American plant physiologist, botanist, educator and inventor. His scientific experiments led to the discovery of process to make "puffed rice" in the USA, introducing a new breakfast cereal in the USA, that was later advertised as "Food Shot From Guns".

== Biography ==
=== Early life and education ===
Anderson was born in Featherstone Township, Goodhue County, Minnesota. His parents John Anderson and Britta Maria (Gustafsdotter) Anderson were Swedish-American immigrants. He grew up in Spring Creek Valley, ten miles from Red Wing, Minnesota. He seemed destined to follow his father into farming but changed course at twenty-seven, entering the University of Minnesota in 1890 to study agriculture. As a college senior in 1894, Anderson invented a "self-registering balance" that was bought by Bausch & Lomb Optical Company. Encouraged by his instructors, Anderson earned a master's degree in plant physiology in 1897. He then traveled to Munich, Germany, in June 1895 to study with leading botanists, earning a doctorate at the Ludwig-Maximilians-Universität München in plant physiology. A loan from his cousin, future Minnesota Governor John Lind helped fund the trip.

=== Puffed rice ===
After completing his studies, Anderson accepted a position at Clemson Agricultural College and taught in South Carolina from 1896 to 1899. In 1901, he became the curator of the Herbarium at Columbia University, which allowed him to do research at the New York Botanical Garden. He believed that a tiny speck of free water would be found in the nucleus of a starch crystal. To prove this, he tried an experiment in December 1901. He heated starch granules that were sealed in a glass tube until they showed signs of browning. Anderson theorized the water inside each grain would turn to steam. He suspected that a reaction within the starch would occur if he broke the tube and set the steam free. The scientist smashed the glass and the resulting explosion produced a stick of pure puffed starch. Anderson's new breakfast food would make him a nationally known figure and the face of a Quaker Oats advertising campaign for almost a decade.

Anderson traveled to Minneapolis for a meeting set up by John Lind and William C. Edgar (1856-1932), editor of Northwestern Miller magazine. Anderson knew he needed investors if he was to turn his puffing process into a usable product. A group of twenty wealthy businessmen offered support. They gave him a laboratory at Minneapolis Steel and Machinery Company to experiment with his ideas. Anderson took a four-by-thirty-six-inch gas pipe and sealed it with pipe heads on each end, one removable. He placed raw rice inside and rotated the cylinder while heating it. When a gauge showed what he felt was enough pressure, Anderson used a sledgehammer to knock loose the removable head. A shower of puffed rice burst from the device. The Minneapolis backers, though interested, sold their shares of the process to Quaker Oats Company. Quaker gave Anderson a Chicago laboratory but took little interest in his discoveries.

Anderson finally captured attention at the 1904 St. Louis World's Fair. He brought eight bronze, twenty-inch-long cylinders that appeared to many onlookers to be small cannons. Anderson loaded each "cannon" with six pounds of raw rice and applied heat. When he uncapped them, a blizzard of expanded rice showered into a two-story-high, forty-foot-wide cage. Helpers bagged the rice and sold it for a nickel to delighted onlookers. By fair's end, Anderson's team had puffed more than 20,000 pounds of rice and sold a quarter-million packages.

He obtained patents on the process and started the Anderson Puffed Rice Company in 1905. American Cereal, a subsidiary the Quaker Oats Company, sold his new product as a breakfast cereal called Puffed Rice. Two years later Quaker Oats took over production. Anderson partnered with Quaker Oats and developed puffed rice and wheat products, including the cereal Quaker Crackels. Quaker Oats advertised puffed cereal as "Prof. Anderson's Gift". Quaker added Puffed Wheat to their line, proclaiming the ready-to-eat cereal as "The Eighth Wonder of the World". Later, the puffed grain would be nicknamed "Food Shot From Guns".

=== Later years ===
Anderson married Lydia McDougall Johnson (1876-1934) on August 11, 1898. Alexander and Lydia Anderson moved to the Red Wing area in 1915. Anderson built a laboratory on their Tower View Farm. The Andersons raised four children while he conducted research. They also bought more land in the area; supported charities, notably the Vasa Children's Home; and endowed student scholarships. Anderson Puffed Rice Company remained in business until 1941. Over his career, Anderson conducted more than 15,000 experiments perfecting cereals and earned 25 United States patents and foreign patents. In 1943, Anderson died at the age of eighty.

One of the Anderson's children, John Pierce Anderson, was married to Eugenie (Anderson) Moore who was appointed by President Harry S Truman as Ambassador to Denmark, the first woman appointed chief of mission at the ambassador level in American history.

== Anderson Center at Tower View ==
The former Tower View Farm was listed on the National Register of Historic Places on April 13, 1977. The property is now the location of the Anderson Center, site of a 700 residency program for artists, writers, and scholars. The A. P. Anderson award is presented annually by the Anderson Center to recognize significant contributions to the cultural and artistic life of Minnesota.

== Other sources ==
- Anderson autobiography, "Food Shot from Guns", 2-4, prepared for Quaker Oats Co., in "Testimony of Dr. Alexander P. Anderson in Jersey Cereal Co. v. Quaker Oats Co.," Oct. 30, 1937, found in Alexander P. Anderson Papers, Minnesota Historical Society, St. Paul.
- Johnson, Frederick L. "Interview Notes," Lydia Hedin and Jean Chesley, July 21, 2001.

== Related reading ==
- Angell, Madeline (1977) Red Wing, Minnesota: Saga of a River Town (Minneapolis, MN: Dillon Press)
- Marton, Renee (2014) Rice: A Global History (Reaktion Books) ISBN 9781780234120
- Dupont, Mary (2019) "Mrs. Ambassador: The Life and Politics of Eugenie Anderson" (St. Paul, MN: Minnesota Historical Society Press). ISBN 9781681341279
