= James Gray (mayor) =

American journalist and politician (1862–1916)

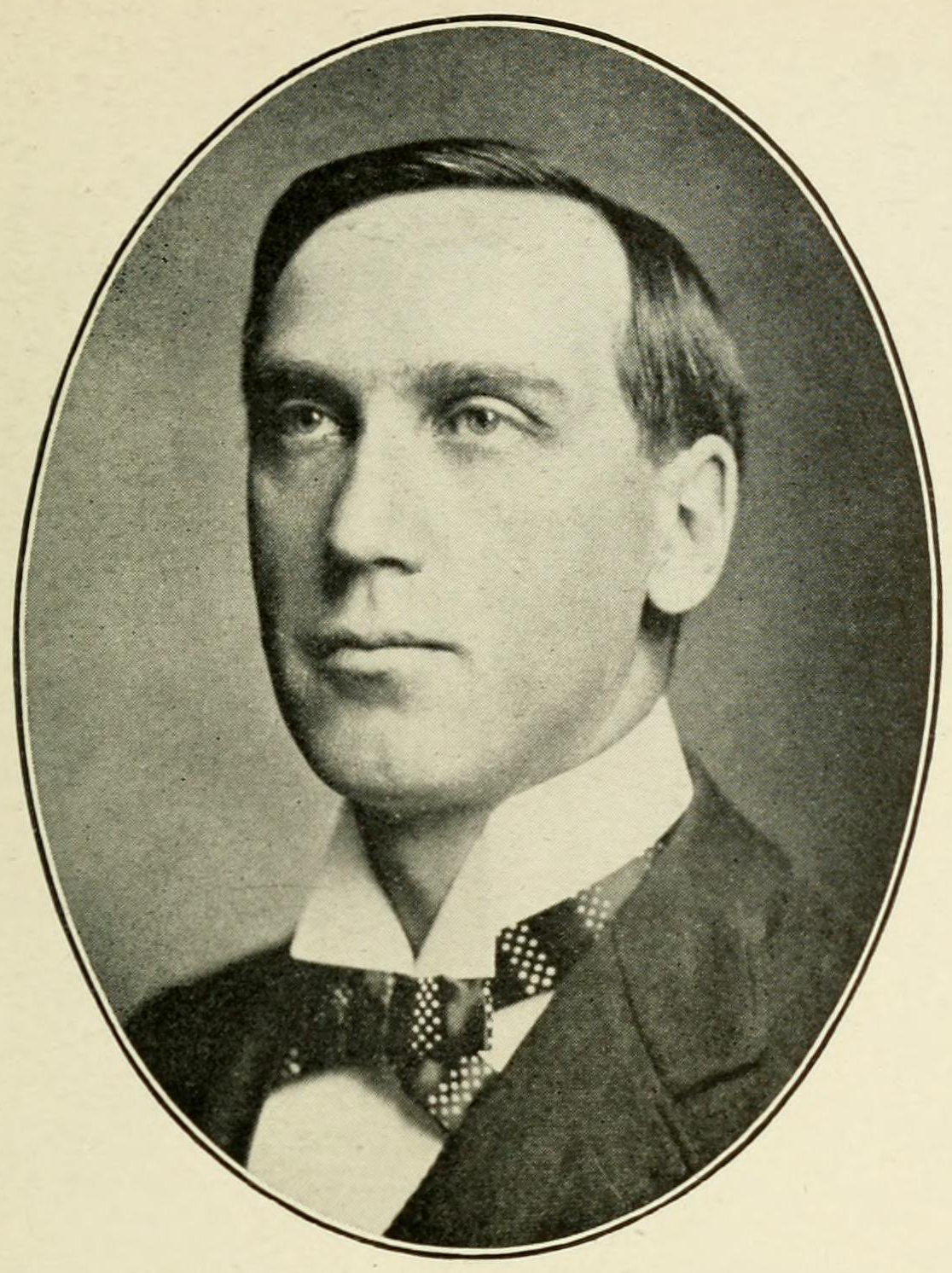
- Gray c. 1903

19th Mayor of Minneapolis
- In office January 2, 1899 – January 7, 1901
- Preceded by: Robert Pratt
- Succeeded by: A. A. Ames

Personal details
- Born: February 18, 1862 Falkirk, Scotland
- Died: September 8, 1916 (aged 54) Washington, D.C., U.S.
- Resting place: Lakewood Cemetery; Minneapolis, Minnesota, U.S. 44°56′11″N 93°17′56″W
- Party: Democratic
- Spouse: Grace Farrington
- Children: Philip Farrington Gray
- Parents: John Gray (father); Elizabeth Ronald (mother)
- Education: University of Minnesota
- Profession: Journalist
- Known for: War correspondent during Spanish–American War

James Gray (February 18, 1862 – September 8, 1916) was a journalist and the 19th mayor of Minneapolis.

== Life and career ==
James Gray was born on February 18, 1862, in Falkirk, Scotland to Elizabeth (née Ronald) and John Gray. Gray's family emigrated to the United States in 1866, settling in Iowa. He attended schools in Dubuque County, Iowa and Jackson County, Iowa. After working as a teacher for a year, Gray moved to Minneapolis in 1880. He attended the University of Minnesota, graduating as valedictorian in 1885. After graduating, he began working with the Minneapolis Tribune as a reporter. When the Minneapolis Times was founded in 1889, he moved there to work as an editor. He was later promoted to managing editor and also served as a special correspondent in Washington, DC during the run up to the Spanish–American War. Based partially on the name recognition he gained from his work as a correspondent, Gray ran as the Democratic nominee for mayor of Minneapolis in 1898 and won. He ran for re-election in 1900 but was defeated by A. A. Ames. After leaving politics he became an editor with the Minneapolis Journal.

Gray died on September 8, 1916, at his desk in Washington, D.C. He is buried in Lakewood Cemetery in Minneapolis.

== Electoral history ==
- Minneapolis Mayoral Election, 1898
  - James Gray 16,066
  - Edward E. Webster 9,494
  - Albert Alonzo Ames 5,266
  - William J. Dean 923
  - Frank A. Malmquist 599
- Minneapolis Mayoral Election, 1900
  - Albert Alonzo Ames 17,292
  - James Gray 12,732
  - William J. Dean 9,140
  - Ole B. Olson 227
  - Asa Kingsbury 217

Political offices
Preceded by Robert Pratt	Mayor of Minneapolis; 1899–1901	Succeeded by A. A. Ames
