= Puffed rice cakes =

Flat hard food made with puffed rice

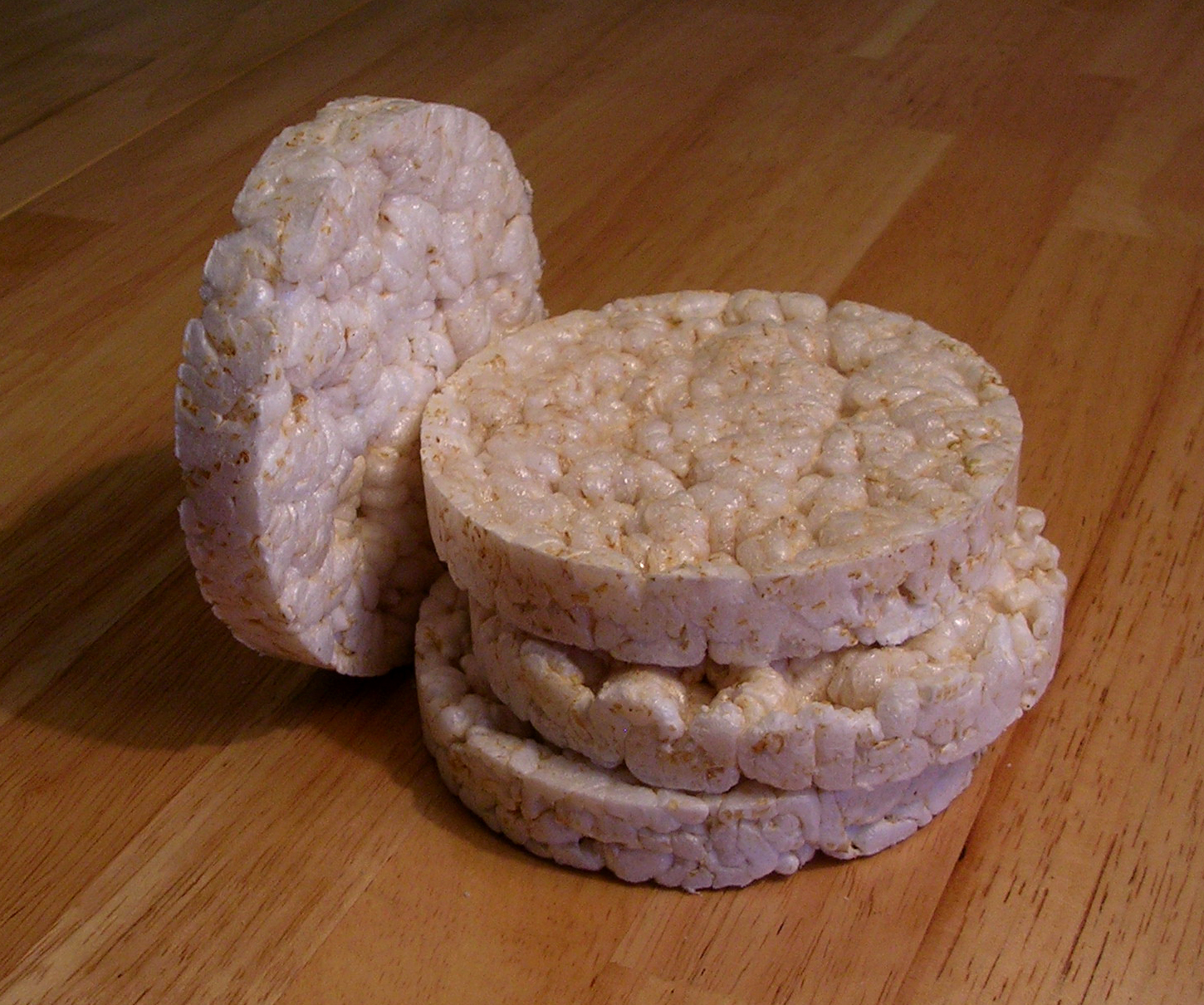
- Type: Snack
- Main ingredients: Puffed rice
- Food energy (per serving): 340 kcal (1,400 kJ)

Puffed rice cakes, also referred to generically as rice cakes, are flat, hard discs made with puffed rice. Typically, they are eaten as a snack or used as a base for other ingredients.

Rice cakes are low in both calories and nutrients. It is often consumed among dieters as a substitute for higher-calorie breads or other food items, especially so during the 1980s and 1990s. It is a gluten-free food, so people with celiac disease can eat them as a substitute for bread.

Some store-bought rice cakes are flavored. Common flavorings include chicken, sweet chili, cheese, butter, chocolate, caramel, salt and vinegar, or apple cinnamon.

Rice cakes are typically round, though square varieties are available.

== Gallery ==
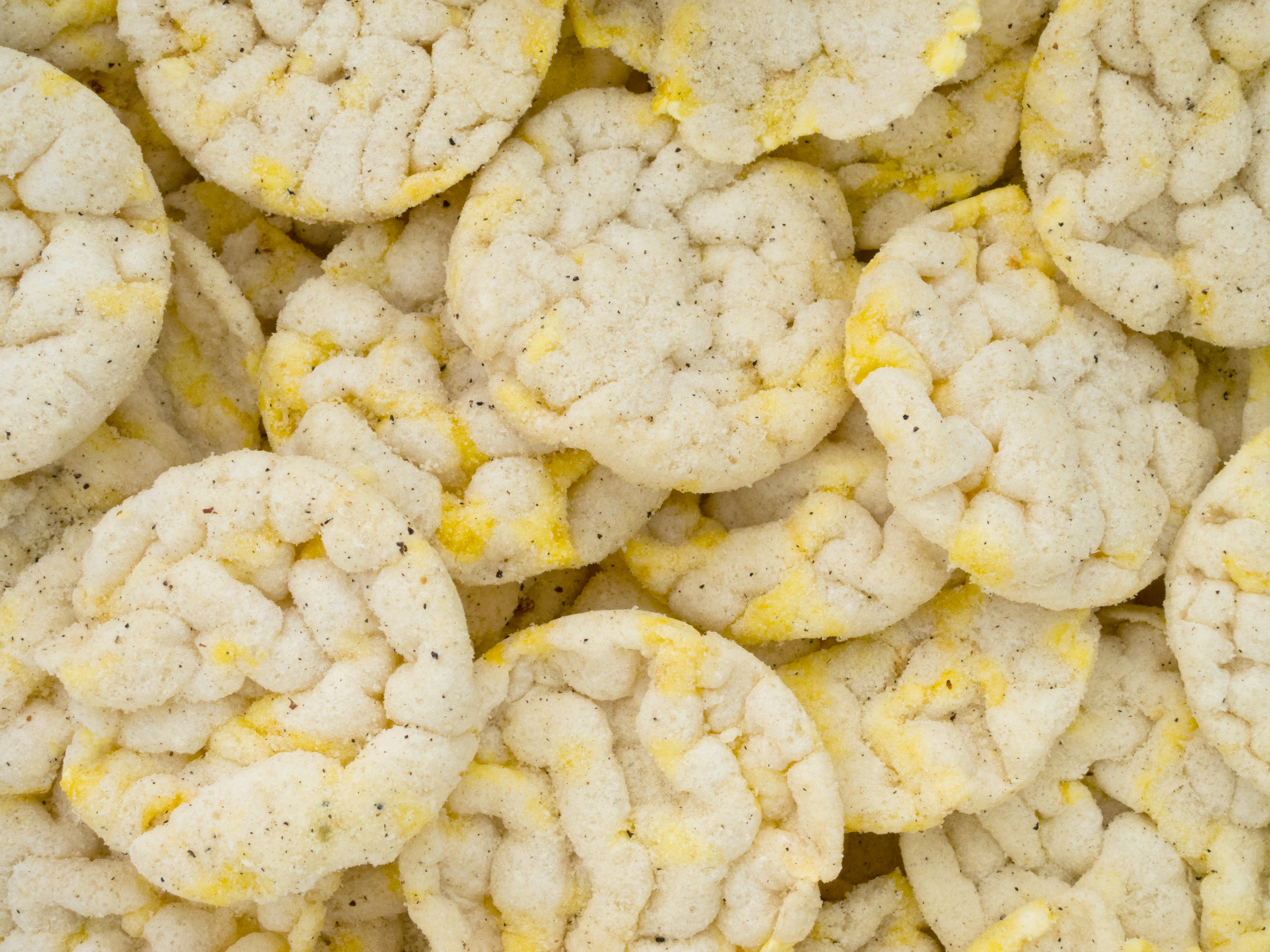
American puffed rice cakes

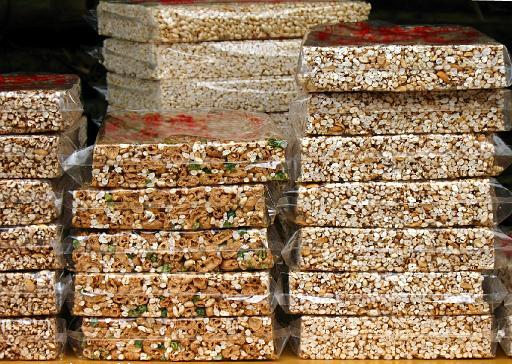
Chinese puffed rice cakes

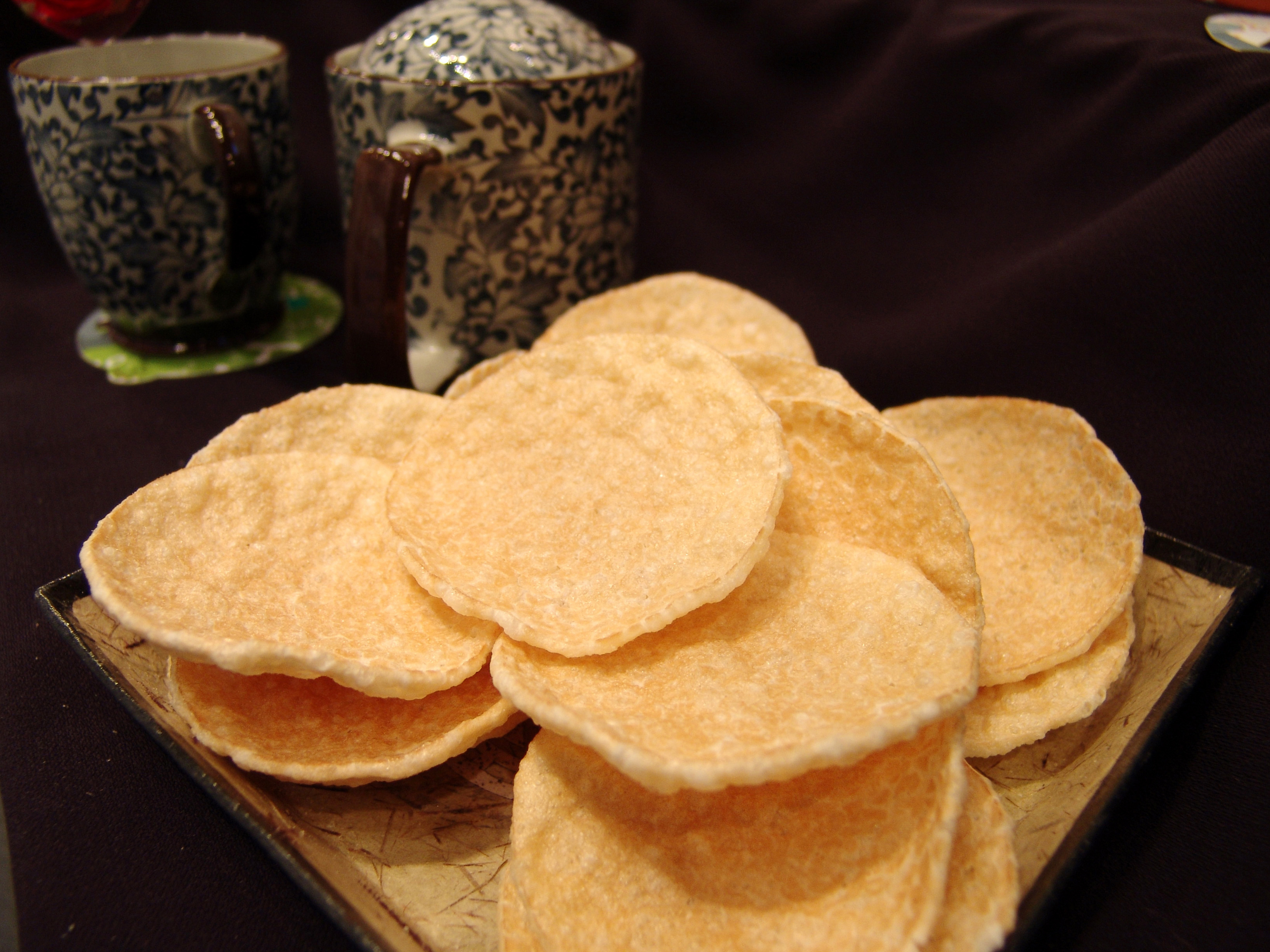
Korean jeopsi-ppeong-twigi (plate-shaped puffed rice cakes)

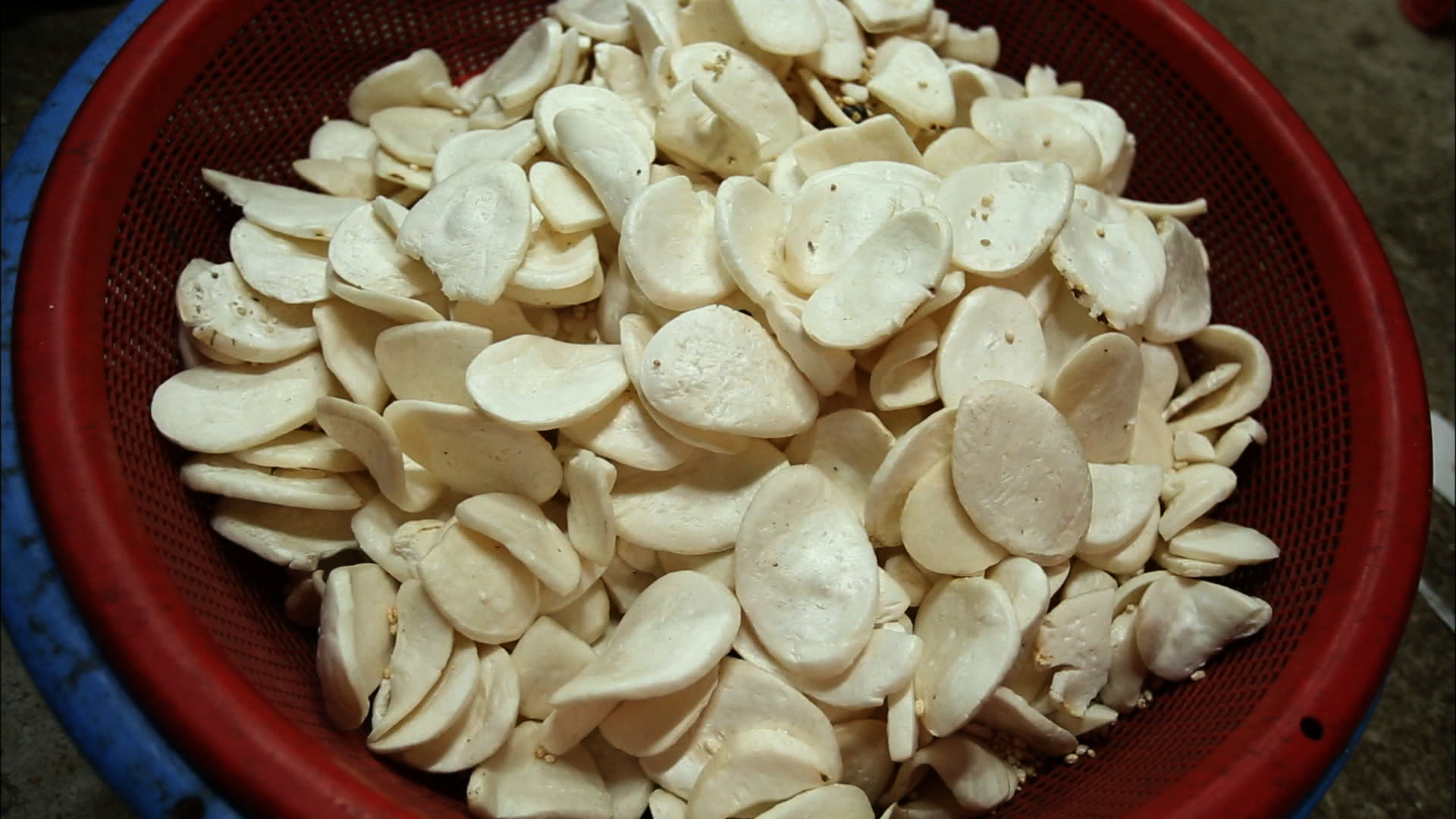
Korean garae-tteok-ppeong-twigi made from sliced rice cakes

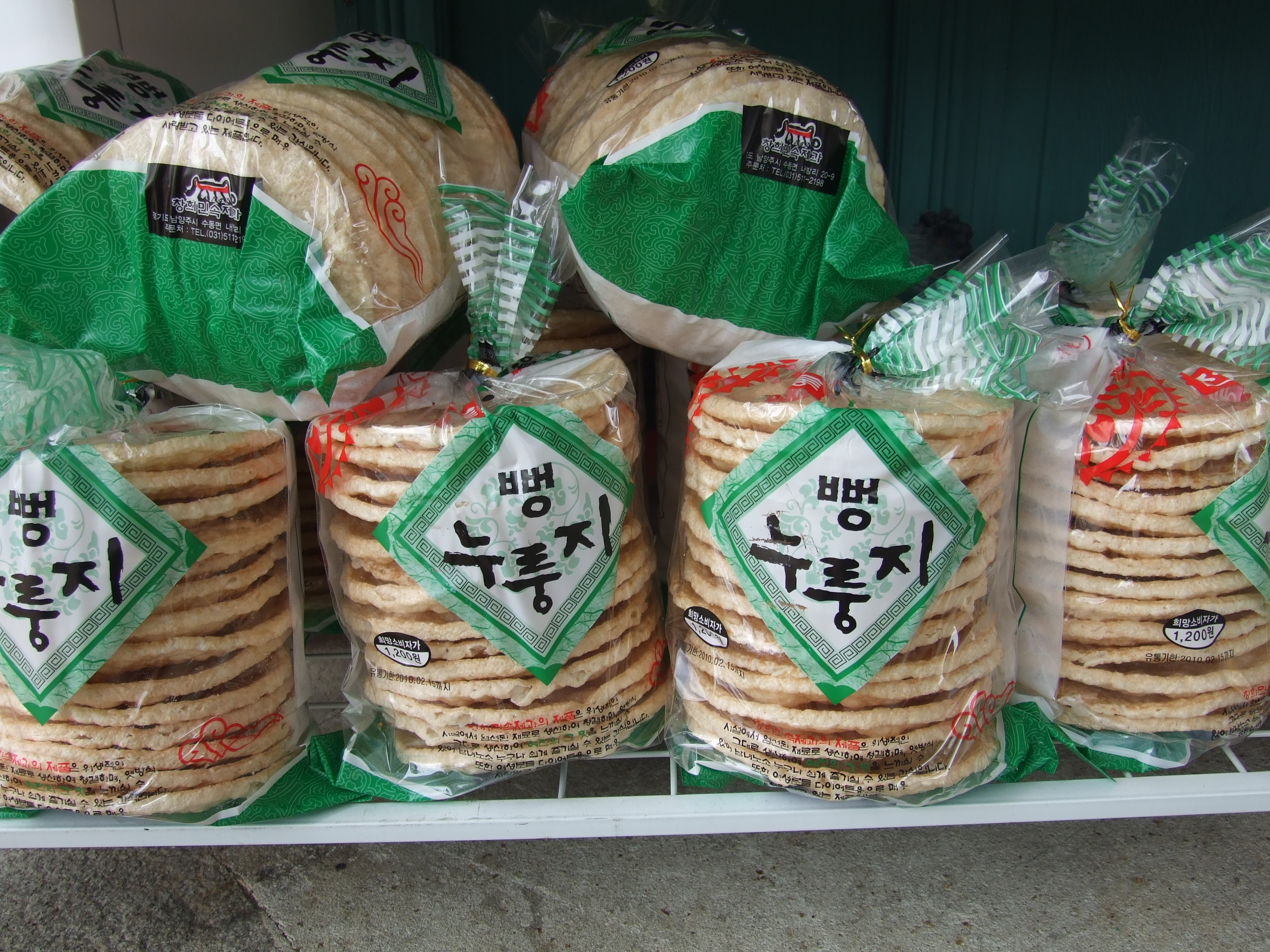
Korean nurungji-ppeong-twigi made from scorched rice

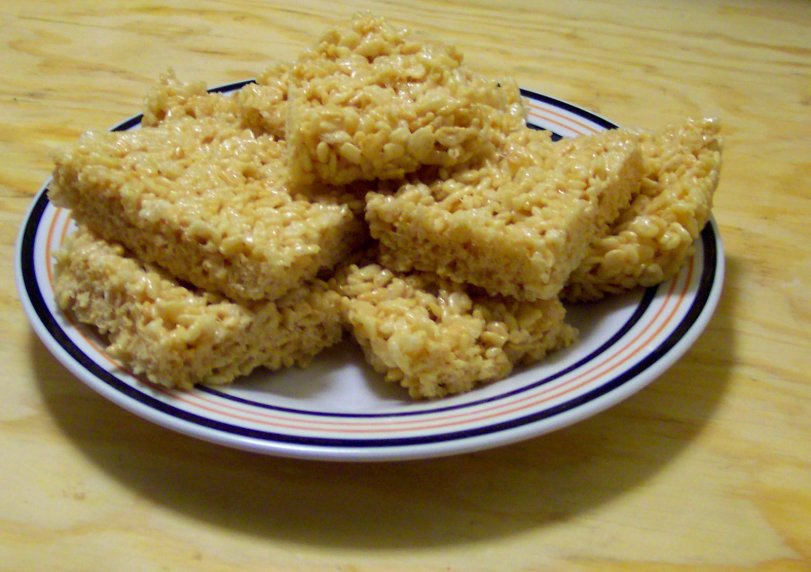
Commercially-prepared Rice Krispies Treats made from puffed rice mixed with marshmallow
