= 1898 Minnesota gubernatorial election =

- November 8, 1898
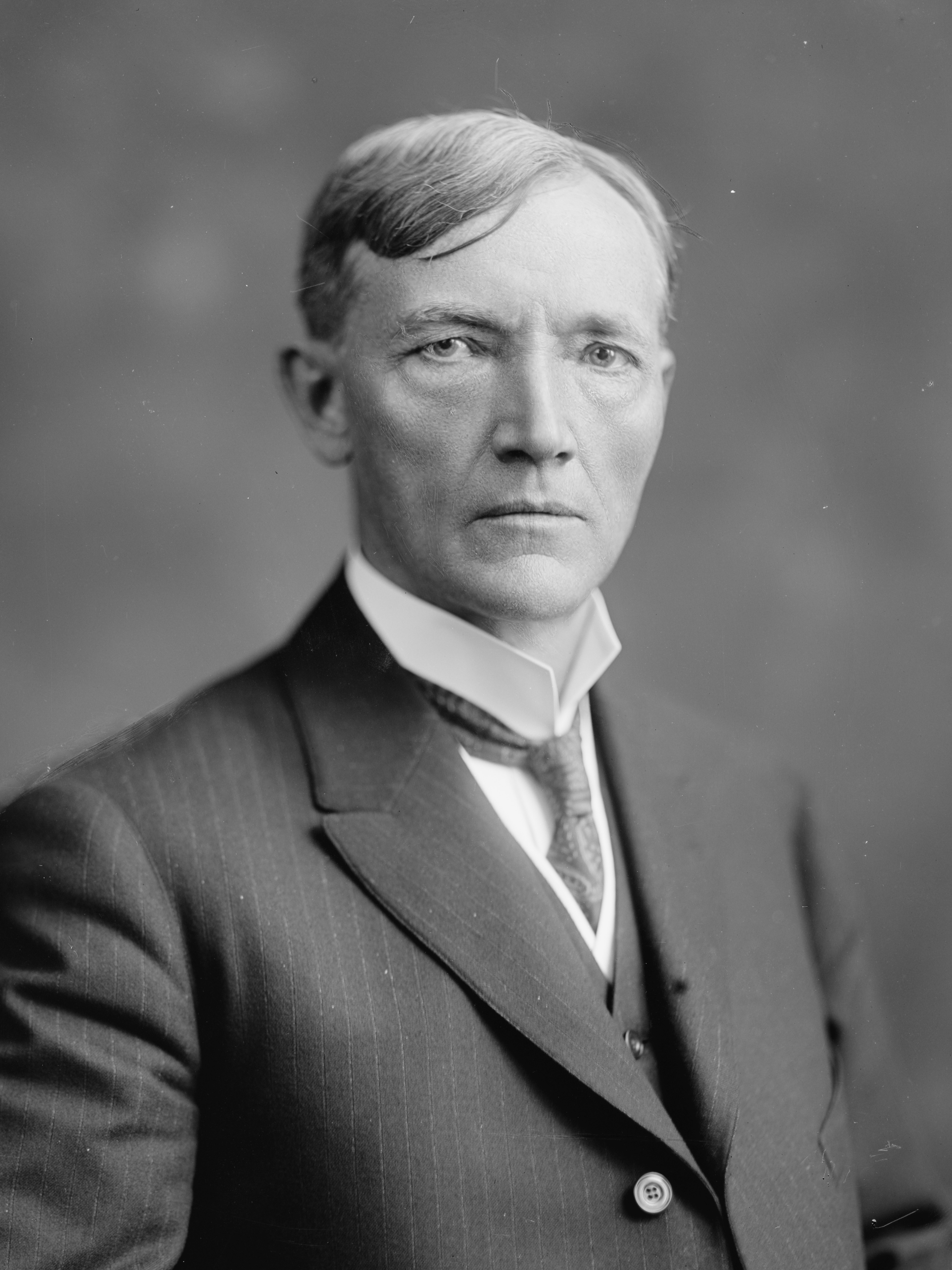

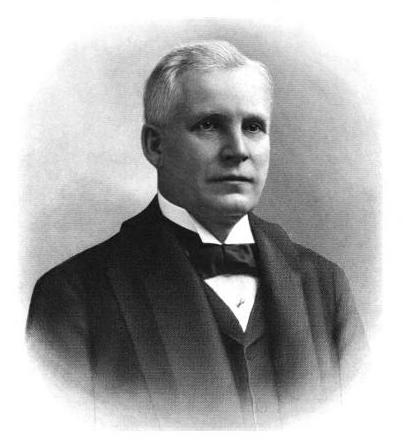
Nominee	John Lind	William Henry Eustis
Party	Democratic	Republican
Alliance	People's Party
Popular vote	131,980	111,796
Percentage	52.26%	44.26%
- County results Lind: 40–50% 50–60% 60–70% Eustis: 40–50% 50–60% 60–70%
Governor before election
David Marston Clough
Republican
Elected Governor
John Lind
Democratic-People's

The 1898 Minnesota gubernatorial election took place on November 8, 1898. Democratic Party of Minnesota candidate John Lind defeated Republican Party of Minnesota challenger William Henry Eustis. This was the second of three successive elections in which John Lind ran as a candidate for a coalition formed from the Democrats and the People's Party. This was also the first time since 1857, and only the second time ever up to that point, that a Democrat was elected governor of Minnesota.

== Candidates ==
- William Henry Eustis, former mayor of Minneapolis (Republican)
- William B. Hammond, secretary of the State Federation of Labor (Socialist Labor)
- George W. Higgins, local business owner in Minneapolis, Minnesota (Prohibition)
- John Lind, former representative from Minnesota's 2nd congressional district (Democratic, People's)
- Lionel C. Long, farmer (Midroad-Populist)

== Campaigns ==
The Democratic State Convention was held on June 9, 1898, and was "small and fast", consisting of only 35 delegates. John Lind was renominated. He was a progressive and a populist.

The Republican State Convention was held on June 30, 1898. The primary was between three men: William Henry Eustis, Samuel Rinnah Van Sant, and Loren W. Collins. Eustis was nominated on the second ballot. He gained support for being a union negotiator during his time as mayor, peacefully ending a rail strike in 1893, and at the benefit of the strikers. This was at a time when most unions were suppressed, often with violence. Eustis was able to gain favor with some of the labor vote because of this, though not enough to secure the election.

A major blow came to Eustis's campaign when incumbent Republican Governor David Marston Clough endorsed Lind, due to a personal disliking of Eustis.

Upon his victory, Lind gave a speech in Sleepy Eye, Minnesota in which he credited his victory to the previous efforts of the Farmer's Alliance and the Populist Party.

== Results ==
1898 gubernatorial election, Minnesota
Party	Candidate	Votes	%	±%
Democratic-People's	John Lind	131,980	52.26%	+4.15%
Republican	William Henry Eustis	111,796	44.26%	−4.91%
Prohibition	George W. Higgins	5,299	2.10%	+0.57%
Midroad-Populist	Lionel C. Long	1,802	0.71%	n/a
Socialist Labor	William B. Hammond	1,685	0.67%	+0.34%
Majority		20,184	8.00%	
Turnout		252,562		
Democratic gain from Republican				

== See also ==
- List of Minnesota gubernatorial elections
