= John Lind (politician) =

American politician (1854–1930)

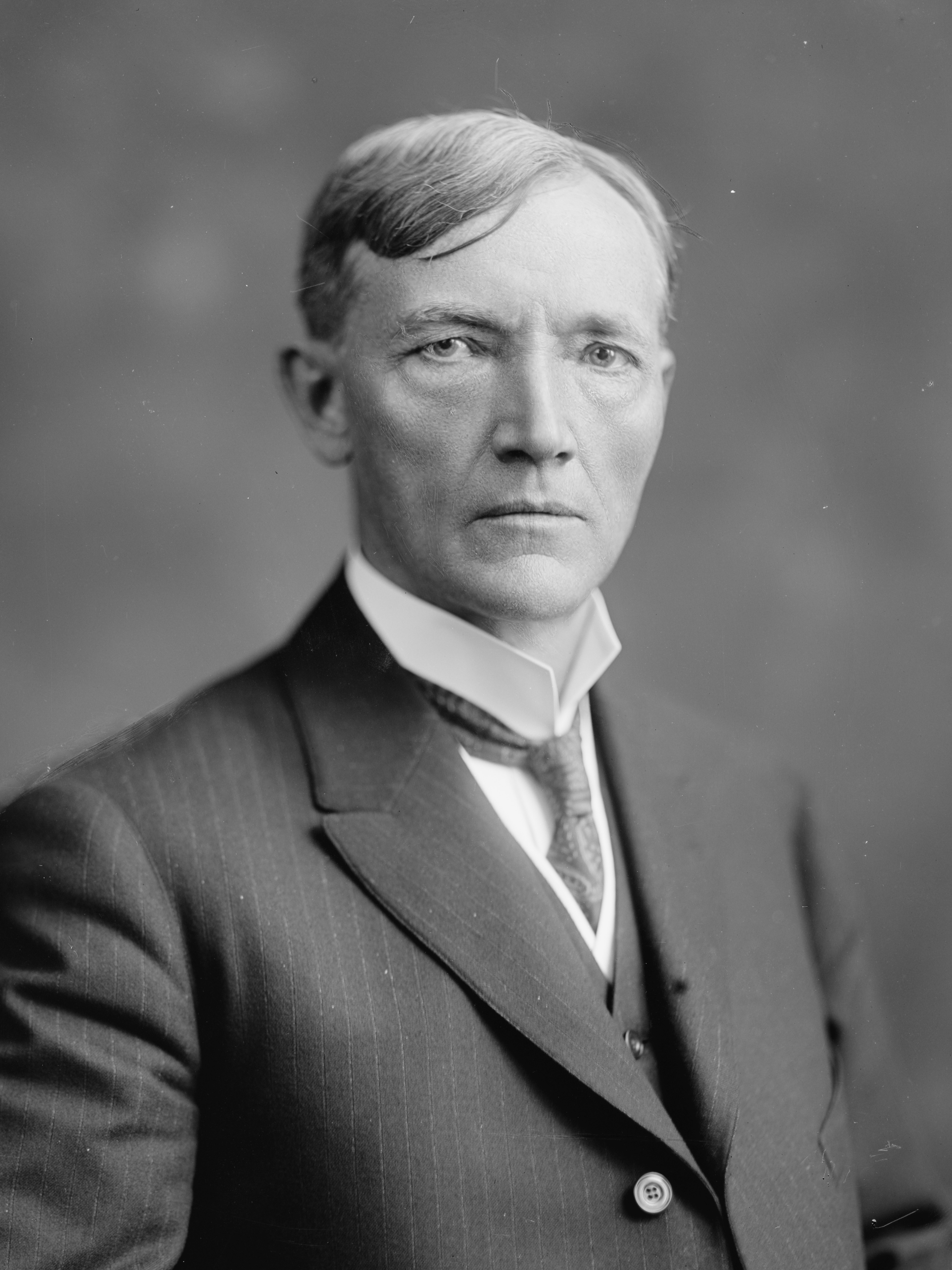
- Lind c. 1899–1901

14th Governor of Minnesota
- In office January 2, 1899 – January 7, 1901
- Lieutenant: Lyndon Ambrose Smith
- Preceded by: David Marston Clough
- Succeeded by: Samuel Rinnah Van Sant

Member of the U.S. House of Representatives from Minnesota
- In office March 4, 1887 – March 3, 1893
- Preceded by: James Wakefield
- Succeeded by: James McCleary
- Constituency: 2nd district
- In office March 4, 1903 – March 3, 1905
- Preceded by: Loren Fletcher
- Succeeded by: Loren Fletcher
- Constituency: 5th district

Personal details
- Born: March 25, 1854 Kånna, Kronoberg County, Småland, Sweden-Norway
- Died: September 18, 1930 (aged 76) Minneapolis, Minnesota, U.S.
- Resting place: Lakewood Cemetery
- Party: Republican (1886–1898); Democratic (after 1898)
- Spouse: Alice A. Shepard
- Relations: Alexander P. Anderson (cousin)
- Education: University of Minnesota Law School
- Profession: educator

Military service
- Allegiance: United States of America
- Branch/service: United States Army
- Years of service: 1898
- Rank: First Lieutenant
- Unit: 12th Minnesota Volunteer Infantry
- Battles/wars: Spanish–American War

Johannes "John" Lind (March 25, 1854 – September 18, 1930), also known as "Honest John", was an American politician from Minnesota. He served as the 14th governor of Minnesota from 1899 to 1901 and represented the state in the United States Congress for four terms. Lind also played an important role in the Mexican Revolution as an envoy for President Woodrow Wilson.

== Early life and career ==
Lind was born on March 25, 1854, in Kånna, Kronoberg County in the Swedish province of Småland. He was born to the farmer Peter Gustaf Jonasson and his wife Katrina Jonasdotter. When he was thirteen years old (in 1868), he emigrated to the United States with his parents. As a teacher, Lind lost his left arm in an accident. He worked as a teacher and superintendent before graduating from the University of Minnesota Law School.

Lind settled in New Ulm to practice law. Most of the inhabitants were German, so Lind adjusted by learning to speak German almost as fluently as he could Swedish. He was soon known among the lawyers across the area.

Lind joined the Republican party almost as soon as he set up his office; most Swedes made the same choice in Minnesota. While he could not yet vote in the 1872 presidential election, he stood at the polls to hand out ballots. Party loyalty brought the usual rewards: a receivership in the United States Land Office in 1881, and 1886 a Republican nomination to Congress. Lind was so devoted to his law practice that in the very convention that first nominated him to Congress, he left before proceedings had closed to attend to a client in the court down at Lincoln County.

== United States Representative ==
Lind was no great orator, but he had special advantages. His district was Republican, generally by a two-to-one margin. The Swedish vote was dependably in favor of Lind, as well, and so were the Germans in New Ulm, thanks to his wide professional acquaintanceship with them. Farmers also resented the duty on binding-twine in the protective tariff, and ran as a moderate tariff revisionist. His support for placing lumber on the duty-free list was far more popular within his district than in the lumber-producing regions in the north of the state. Concerned over the destruction of the nation's forests and a strong supporter for the national timber-culture law, he hoped that a larger importation of foreign lumber would slacken the timber companies' appetite for American trees.

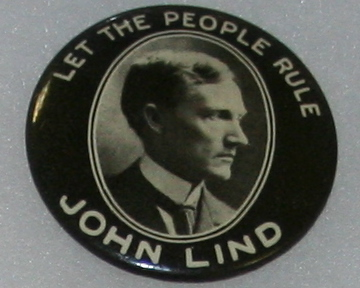
John Lind campaign button

Lind served as a Republican in the United States House of Representatives from March 4, 1887, to March 3, 1893, in the 50th, 51st, and 52nd congresses. As a member of the House Commerce Committee, he handled all the bills dealing with bridge construction in the Northwest and stood fast against monopoly privileges. Any railroad company authorized to span a river would have to guarantee free use by every other railroad, in return for reasonable compensation. Lind offered an anti-trust bill of his own, forbidding railroads from carrying any of the so-called patent cars—those like the oil-cars that Standard Oil built, or the refrigerator cars that the meat-packers designed—that could not be furnished to all shippers at equal and fair rates. Even when he supported the McKinley protective tariff, the highest in history, he made himself conspicuous trying to cut the rates on jute-bagging for small shippers and in his fight against a seven hundred percent hike in the protection given to binding-twine manufacturers. In 1890, when the Farmers' Alliances were defeating other Minnesota Republican congressmen, Lind survived re-election challenges.

Lind chose not to continue in the House. His law practice had been neglected, and, with no independent means, he found it better to announce his retirement at the end of the Fifty-Second Congress. Lind left office on March 3, 1893.

== Between offices ==
Lind did not withdraw from politics entirely, and was considered for the Republican nomination for governor in 1892, but was conspicuously uninterested. Four years later, however, he ran for governor as a Democrat. He was unanimously nominated by both the Democratic and Populist parties, as the left wing of the Democratic Party of Minnesota was currently in control at a time when the Republican party was becoming increasingly conservative in the state. Lind would lose to incumbent David Marston Clough by only 0.06% of the vote, the closest to winning the Democrats or Populists had yet gotten.

Lind served in the Spanish–American War in 1898.

Upon returning, he was unanimously nominated once again by the Democratic and Populist parties for the 1898 Minnesota gubernatorial election. Upon his victory, Lind gave a speech in Sleepy Eye, Minnesota where credited his victory to the previous efforts the Farmer's Alliance and the Populist Party.

== Governor of Minnesota ==
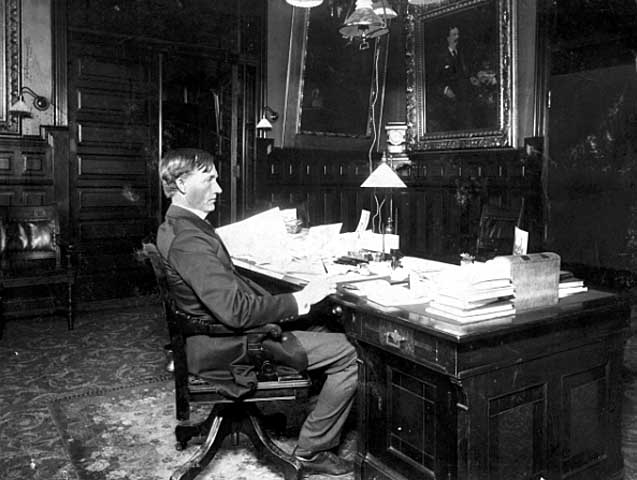
Lind seated at his desk in the Minnesota State Capitol

He served as the 14th governor of Minnesota from January 2, 1899, to January 7, 1901.

Facing re-election in 1900, Lind had opposition from both within the Democratic party, and much more from within the Populist party. Populist convention, held August 30, 1900, would split, with one behind Adolphe Paradis, and another, nicknamed the 'Bolter's Convention', nominating Lind. Paradis would not continue his run for governor independent of Lind, instead asking Lind to return to the convention for a 'fair fight', and a primary. Lind did not return to the Populist convention, and as Paradis was no longer officially running, Lind won by default. Within the Democratic party, Lind faced continued opposition from Party Boss Michael Doran. Doran stated "Let him with the nomination, he will be slaughtered at the polls."

== Later career ==
In 1902, Lind was first hoped to run for governor again, but declined. Leonard A. Rosing, with Lind's support, would be nominated instead.

Lind also served in the United States House of Representatives from March 4, 1903, to March 3, 1905, now as a Democrat representing Minnesota's 5th congressional district. Around this time, Lind developed a political rivalry with fellow Democrat John Albert Johnson, who was elected governor in 1904. Despite a personal rivalry, they both agreed not to run against each other. Following Governor Johnson's death in 1909, the Democratic Party was without a candidate in 1910. Lind was asked to run again that year, but declined.

=== Mexican Revolution ===
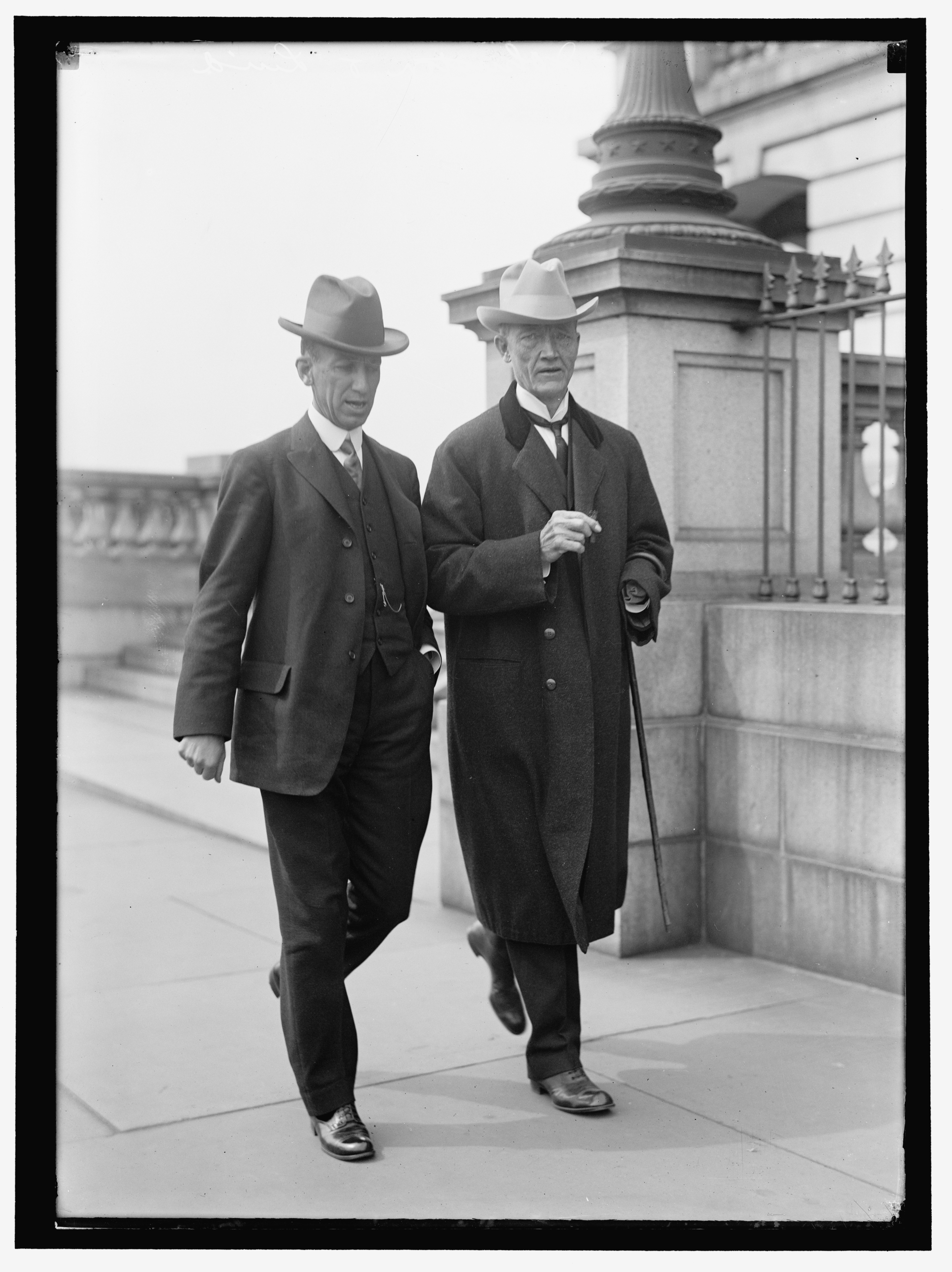
Lind (right) in 1914.

On March 4, 1913, Woodrow Wilson was sworn in as President of the United States shortly after the February 22 assassination of Mexican President Francisco I. Madero and Vice President José María Pino Suárez. It soon became clear that U.S. Ambassador Henry Lane Wilson was complicit in the plot.

General Victoriano Huerta was now president of Mexico, and Wilson and Secretary of State William Jennings Bryan immediately sent Lind to Mexico as Envoy for Mexican Affairs. Lind had financial interests in Mexico and had long-standing ties with other U.S. landholders.

Lind attempted to persuade Huerta to call prompt elections and not stand as a candidate in them, but Huerta refused. Lind "threatened a military intervention by the United States in case the demands were rejected," but promised an American loan to Mexico if Huerta stepped aside. When rebellions broke against the Huerta regime, Lind backed Venustiano Carranza, a large landowner and former Governor of Coahuila, and his Constitutionalist faction against more radical elements in the rebellion, mainly Constitutionalist Army general Pancho Villa.

=== Later influence ===
In 1914, Lind was a staunch supporter of Democratic candidate Winfield Scott Hammond, who had been his friend for over thirty years at that point. Lind was unable to participate in the campaigning due to being ill.

In 1918, Lind led the State Labor Convention, which resulted in the founding of the Minnesota Farmer-Labor Party.

== Personal life ==
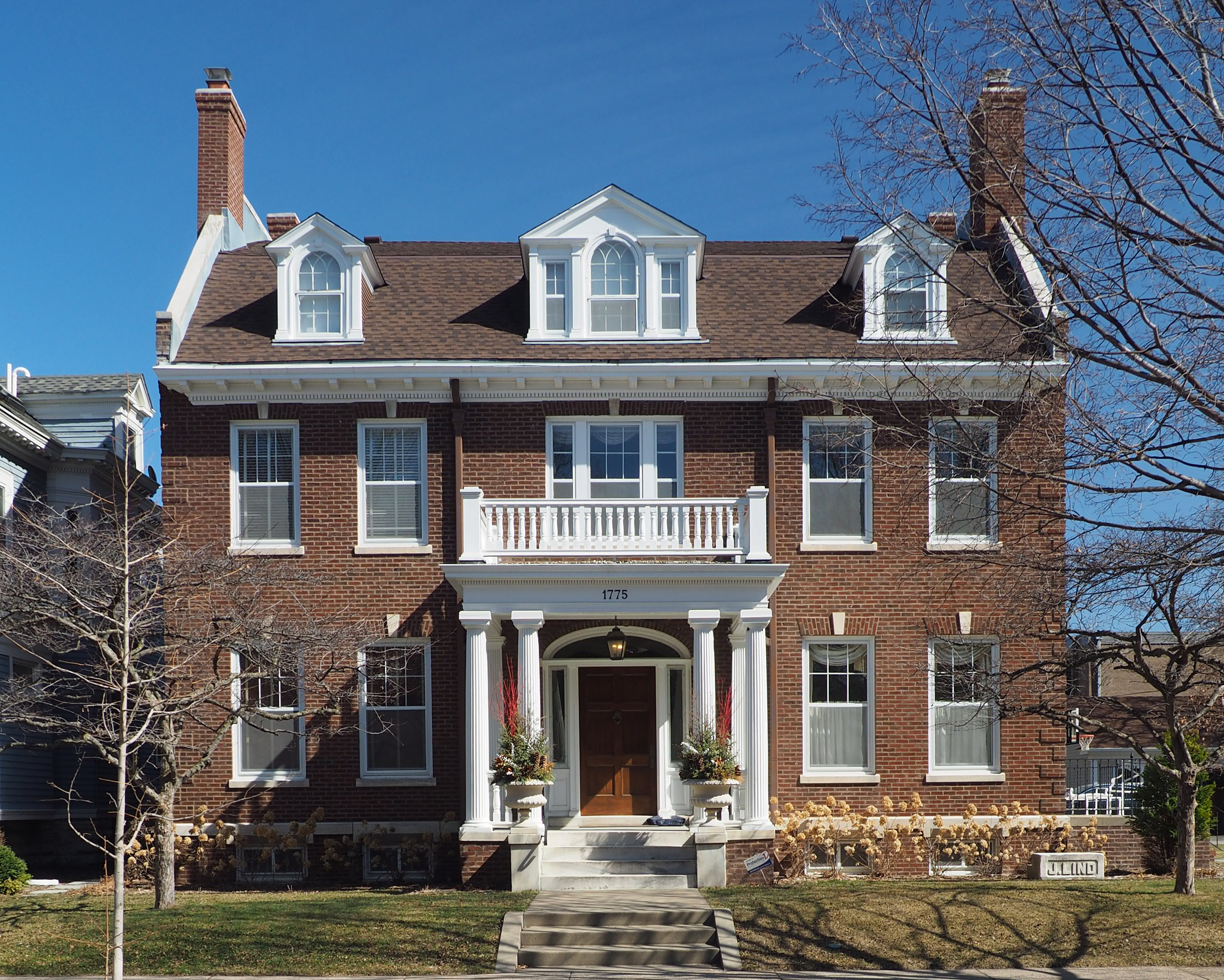
Lind's house in Minneapolis, built 1905–1907

In 1879 he married Alice A. Shepard. His cousin was botantist and inventor Alexander P. Anderson.

Lind was known for having a temper. According to an article on the front page of the Moose Lake (Minnesota) Star on January 17, 1901: "Ex-governor John Lind after having freed himself from the duties of the governor last Thursday walked down to the Dispatch office in St. Paul and administered to Editor Black a well-deserved licking. For a one-armed man, John Lind can make some telling blows once in a while."

== Death ==
He died on September 18, 1930, in Minneapolis, Minnesota. He was buried in Lakewood Cemetery.

== See also ==
- List of United States governors born outside the United States

Party political offices
Preceded by George Loomis Becker	Democratic nominee for Governor of Minnesota; 1896, 1898, 1900	Succeeded by Leonard A. Rosing
Preceded by Sidney M. Owen	Populist Party nominee for Governor of Minnesota; 1896, 1898, 1900	Succeeded by Thomas J. Meighen
Political offices
Preceded by David Marston Clough	Governor of Minnesota; 1899 – 1901	Succeeded by Samuel Rinnah Van Sant
U.S. House of Representatives
Preceded by James Wakefield	U.S. Representative from Minnesota's 2nd congressional district 1887 – 1893	Succeeded by James McCleary
Preceded by Loren Fletcher	U.S. Representative from Minnesota's 5th congressional district 1903 – 1905	Succeeded by Loren Fletcher
