= Merchant's Hotel =

The following buildings are known as Merchant(s) Hotel:

- Merchant Hotel (Belfast), in Ireland
- Merchant Tower also known as Merchant's Hotel, in Campbellsville, Kentucky
- Merchants Hotel (St. Paul), Minnesota
- Merchant Hotel (Portland, Oregon)
- Merchants Manor Hotel
