= 2005 Minneapolis municipal election =

- September 13, 2005 (primary); November 8, 2005 (general)
- City Council results by ward

The 2005 Minneapolis municipal elections in the U.S. state of Minnesota held a scheduled primary election on 13 September and a general election on 8 November. Voters in the city elected:

- 1 mayor
- 13 city council members, elected by ward
- 6 Minneapolis Public Library trustees
- 2 members of the Board of Estimate and Taxation, and
- 3 at-large and 6 elected by district members of the Park and Recreation Board.

== Results ==
=== Mayor ===
- Incumbent R.T. Rybak and Hennepin County Commissioner Peter McLaughlin, both DFLers, advanced to the general election on November 8 for the mayoral post. Both candidates had sought endorsement at the DFL City Convention, but neither was able to reach the 60% required. In the Primary election, Rybak was the overall winner with 44.49% of the vote, while McLaughlin received 35.33%.

Candidate	Primary		General	
Candidate	Votes	%	Votes	%
R. T. Rybak	14,782	44.49	43,198	61.47
Peter McLaughlin	11,739	35.33	25,807	36.72
Farheen Hakeem	4,600	13.84		
Mark Koscielski	585	1.76		
Don Johnson	423	1.27		
Dick Franson	269	0.81		
Gerald James Savage	240	0.72		
Marcus Harcus	147	0.44		
Tim Nolan	140	0.42		
Gregory A. Brown	108	0.33		
David A. Alvarado	101	0.30		
Gregory Groettum	93	0.28		
Write-in			1,268	1.80
Total	33,227	100.00	70,273	100.00

=== City Council ===
- The DFL-endorsed candidates won in all races except Ward 2 (Green Party Cam Gordon won by 141 votes over DFLer Cara Letofsky). In wards where there was no DFL endorsement (8 & 10), the seat was won by the candidate who came closest to getting the DFL endorsement.

=== Other Offices ===
- In other offices, the DFL-endorsed candidates won in all races except 1 Park Board seat (Incumbent Annie Young had no DFL-endorsed opponent) and 1 Library Board seat (Incumbent Anita Duckor (independent) beat Gary Thaden (DFL). (Thaden was later appointed by the Minneapolis City Council).

== Later developments ==
City Council Member Dean Zimmermann was accused by the Federal Bureau of Investigation of accepting bribes, see Minneapolis City Council. In December 2006, he was convicted and sentenced to prison. He was held in a Federal Prison in Colorado, but was released in summer 2008 to a halfway house in Minneapolis.

== See also ==
- 2009 Minneapolis municipal elections
