= List of mayors of Minneapolis =

City's chief executive officer

Mayor of Minneapolis
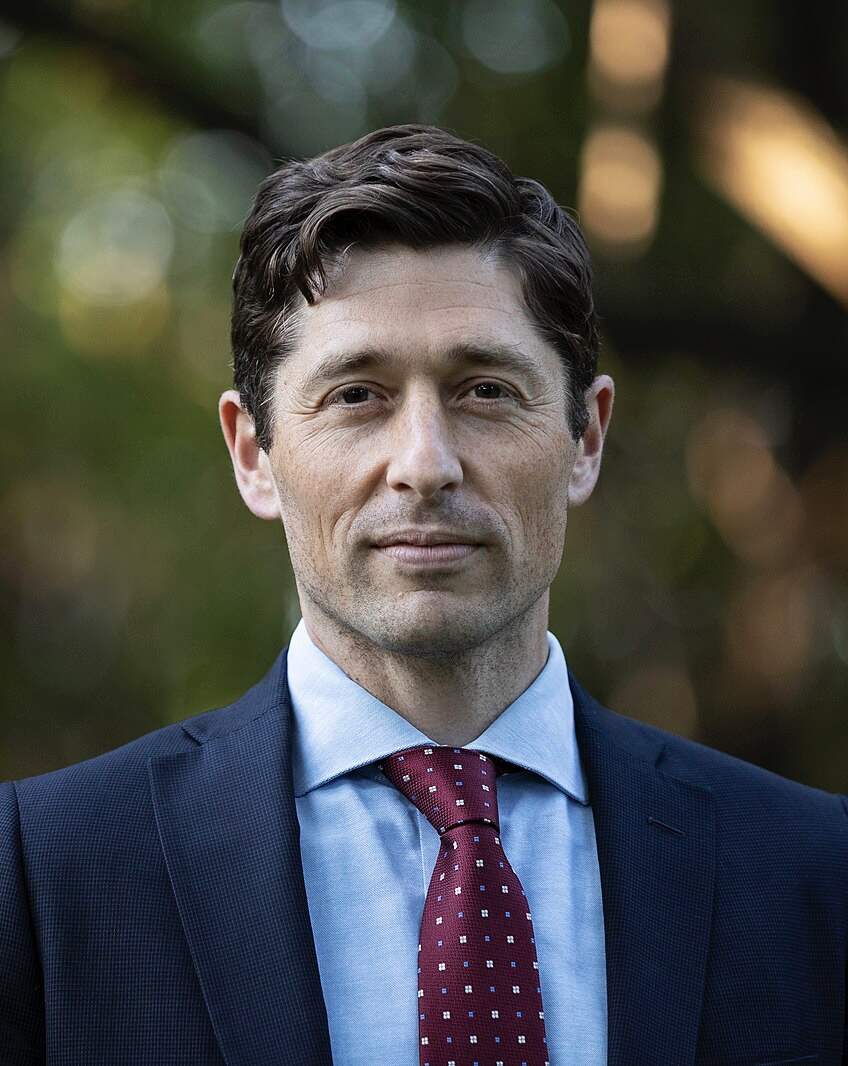
- Incumbent; Jacob Frey since January 2, 2018
- Government of Minneapolis
- Seat: Minneapolis City Hall
- Term length: Four years, no term limit
- Inaugural holder: Dorilus Morrison
- Formation: 1867; 159 years ago
- Website: MinneapolisMN.gov

The mayor of Minneapolis is the chief executive officer of the City of Minneapolis, Minnesota, responsible for overseeing the city's administration. As the political and ceremonial leader of the city, the mayor also represents Minneapolis on the state, national, and international levels. The mayor's office is located in the Minneapolis City Hall.

== History ==
Minneapolis has had a politically diverse set of mayors since its incorporation. In the years since its incorporation, the political representation in the mayoral office has shifted. The city has seen mayors from the Republican, Democratic, Democratic-Farmer-Labor, Farmer-Labor, and Socialist parties, as well as from unaffiliated backgrounds. Notable historical figures include A.A. "Doc" Ames, known for his multiple terms and controversial tenure, Hubert Humphrey, who later became vice president of the United States, and Sharon Sayles Belton, the first African American and first woman to hold the office.

== Term in office ==
The term of office for mayor of Minneapolis is four years, with no limit on the number of terms an individual can serve. The inauguration of the newly elected mayor takes place in January following the municipal election.

From 1867 to 1878, mayors were elected for a one-year term. Beginning in 1878 the term was extended to two years. The term was extended to four years beginning in January 1982, to provide mayors with more time to achieve their programs.

The most recent election for mayor of Minneapolis was held on November 4, 2025, and the next will be on November 6, 2029.

== Role ==
As Minneapolis' chief executive officer, the mayor is tasked with enforcing all municipal laws, overseeing and coordinating the activities of city departments, and drafting and presenting the city budget at the close of each fiscal year. The mayor holds the authority to approve or veto legislation passed by the Minneapolis City Council.

The Mayor's Office, which includes the mayor and several staffers, is involved in information technology, neighborhood and community relations, public safety, public works, racial inclusion, and climate.

== List ==
No.	Image	Name	Elected	Took office	Left office	Party
1		Dorilus Morrison		February 26, 1867	April 14, 1868	Republican
2		Hugh G. Harrison		April 14, 1868	April 13, 1869	Republican
3		Dorilus Morrison		April 13, 1869	April 12, 1870	Republican
4		Eli B. Ames		April 12, 1870	April 9, 1872	Democratic
5		Eugene McLanahan Wilson		April 9, 1872	April 8, 1873	Democratic
6		George A. Brackett		April 8, 1873	April 14, 1874	Republican
7		Eugene McLanahan Wilson		April 14, 1874	April 13, 1875	Democratic
8		Orlando C. Merriman		April 13, 1875	April 11, 1876	Democratic
9		A.A. (Doc.) Ames		April 11, 1876	April 10, 1877	Democratic
10		John De Laittre		April 10, 1877	April 9, 1878	Republican
11		Alonzo Cooper Rand		April 9, 1878	April 11, 1882	Republican
12		A.A. (Doc.) Ames		April 11, 1882	April 8, 1884	Democratic
13		George A. Pillsbury		April 8, 1884	April 13, 1886	Republican
14		A.A. (Doc.) Ames		April 13, 1886	January 7, 1889	Democratic
15		Edward C. Babb		January 7, 1889	January 5, 1891	Republican
16		Philip B. Winston		January 5, 1891	January 2, 1893	Democratic
17		William H. Eustis		January 2, 1893	January 7, 1895	Republican
18		Robert Pratt		January 7, 1895	January 2, 1899	Republican
19		James Gray		January 2, 1899	January 7, 1901	Democratic
20		A.A. (Doc.) Ames		January 7, 1901	August 27, 1902	Republican
21		David P. Jones		August 27, 1902	January 5, 1903	Republican
22		J. C. Haynes		January 5, 1903	January 2, 1905	Democratic
23		David P. Jones		January 2, 1905	January 7, 1907	Republican
24		J. C. Haynes		January 7, 1907	January 6, 1913	Democratic
25		Wallace G. Nye		January 6, 1913	January 1, 1917	Republican
26		Thomas Van Lear		January 1, 1917	January 6, 1919	Socialist
27		J. E. Meyers		January 6, 1919	July 3, 1921	Loyalist
28		George E. Leach		July 4, 1921	July 7, 1929	Republican
29		William F. Kunze		July 8, 1929	July 5, 1931	Republican
30		William A. Anderson		July 6, 1931	July 2, 1933	Farmer–Labor
31		A. G. Bainbridge		July 3, 1933	July 7, 1935	Republican
32		Thomas E. Latimer		July 8, 1935	July 4, 1937	Farmer–Labor
33		George E. Leach		July 5, 1937	July 6, 1941	Republican
34		Marvin L. Kline		July 7, 1941	July 1, 1945	Republican
35		Hubert Humphrey		July 2, 1945	November 30, 1948	Democratic–Farmer–Labor
36		Eric G. Hoyer		December 1, 1948	July 7, 1957	Democratic–Farmer–Labor
37		P. Kenneth Peterson	1957	July 8, 1957	July 2, 1961	Republican
37		P. Kenneth Peterson	1959	July 8, 1957	July 2, 1961	Republican
38		Arthur Naftalin		July 3, 1961	July 6, 1969	Democratic–Farmer–Labor
39		Charles Stenvig		July 7, 1969	December 31, 1973	Independent
40		Richard Erdall	—N/a	December 31, 1973		Republican
41		Albert Hofstede		January 1, 1974	December 31, 1975	Democratic–Farmer–Labor
42		Charles Stenvig		January 1, 1976	December 31, 1977	Independent
43		Albert Hofstede		January 1, 1978	December 31, 1979	Democratic–Farmer–Labor
44		Donald M. Fraser		January 1, 1980	December 31, 1993	Democratic–Farmer–Labor
45		Sharon Sayles Belton	1993	January 1, 1994	December 31, 2001	Democratic–Farmer–Labor
45		Sharon Sayles Belton	1997	January 1, 1994	December 31, 2001	Democratic–Farmer–Labor
46		R. T. Rybak	2001	January 1, 2002	December 31, 2013	Democratic–Farmer–Labor
46		R. T. Rybak	2005	January 1, 2002	December 31, 2013	Democratic–Farmer–Labor
46		R. T. Rybak	2009	January 1, 2002	December 31, 2013	Democratic–Farmer–Labor
47		Betsy Hodges	2013	January 1, 2014	January 2, 2018	Democratic–Farmer–Labor
48		Jacob Frey	2017	January 2, 2018	incumbent	Democratic–Farmer–Labor
48		Jacob Frey	2021	January 2, 2018	incumbent	Democratic–Farmer–Labor
48		Jacob Frey	2025	January 2, 2018	incumbent	Democratic–Farmer–Labor

Mayors of Minneapolis by party affiliation
Party	Mayors
Republican	21
Democratic	11
Democratic-Farmer-Labor	10
Farmer-Labor	2
Independent	2
Loyalist	1
Socialist	1

== Mayor of St. Anthony ==
St. Anthony was a city that was incorporated into Minneapolis in 1872. From 1855 to 1872, St. Anthony had 13 mayors.

No.	Image	Name	Took office	Left office	Party
1		Henry T. Welles	April 13, 1855	April 9, 1856	Democratic
2		Alvaren Allen	April 9, 1856	August 23, 1856	Democratic
—N/a		David A. Secombe (Mayor Pro-Temp)	August 23, 1856	April 7, 1857	Republican
3		William W. Wales	April 7, 1857	April 6, 1858	Republican
4		Orrin Curtis	April 6, 1858	April 5, 1860	Democratic
5		R.B. Graves	April 5, 1860	April 8, 1861	Republican
6		Orlando C. Merriman	April 8, 1861	April 1863	Democratic
7		Edwin S. Brown	April 1863	April 11, 1864	Democratic
8		Orlando C. Merriman	April 11, 1864	April 7, 1865	Democratic
9		William W. Wales	April 7, 1865	April 10, 1866	Republican
10		Orlando C. Merriman	April 10, 1866	April 7, 1868	Democratic
11		Winthrop Young	April 7, 1868	April 10, 1869	Democratic
12		William W. McNair	April 10, 1869	April 4, 1871	Democratic
13		Edwin S. Brown	April 4, 1871	April 8, 1872	Democratic
