= 2009 Minneapolis mayoral election =

- November 3, 2009
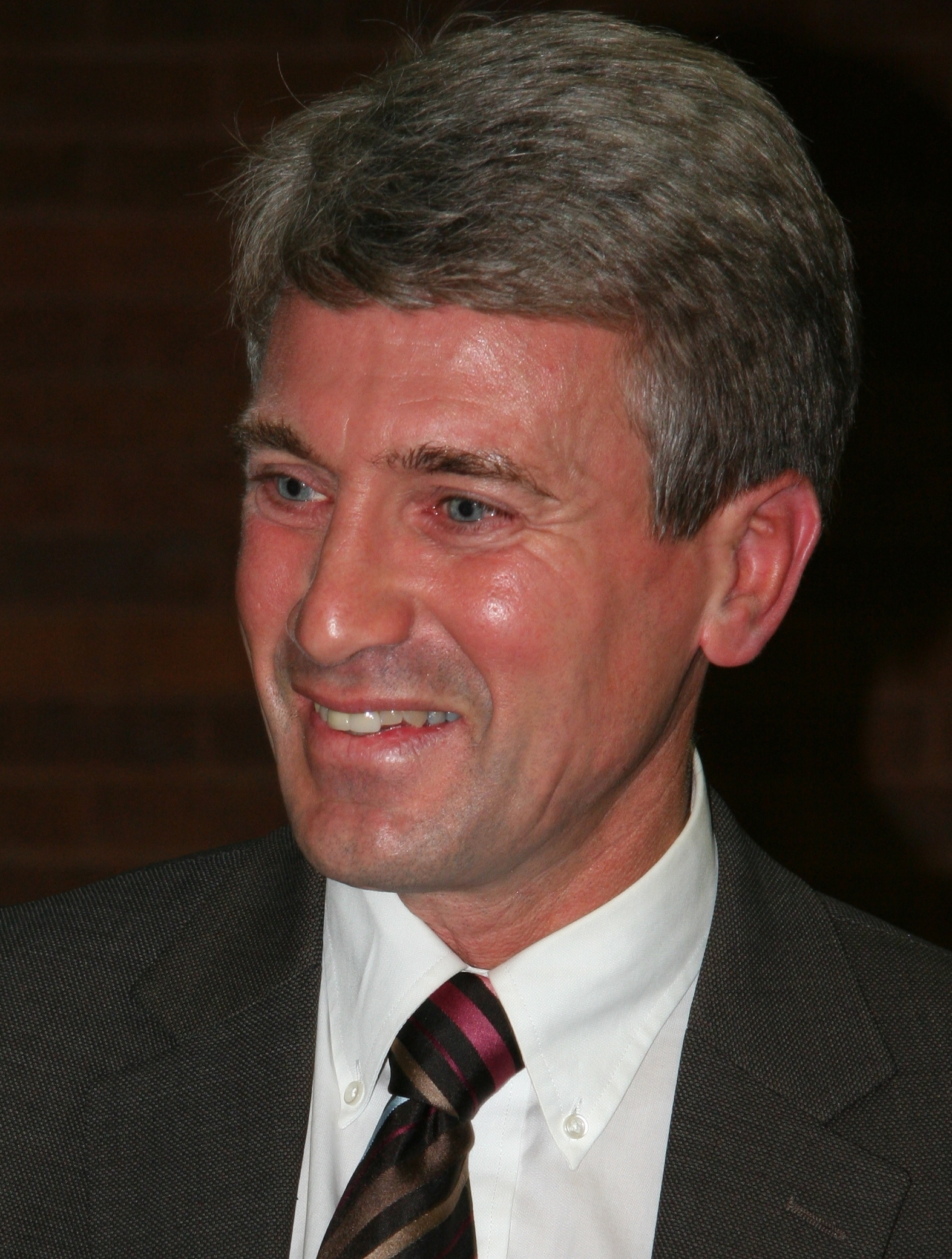

Candidate	R. T. Rybak	Papa John Kolstad
Party	Democratic (DFL)	Independent
Popular vote	33,234	4,953
Percentage	73.60%	10.97%
- First preference votes by precinct Rybak: 40–50% 50–60% 60-70% 70-80% 80-90%
Mayor before election
R. T. Rybak
Democratic (DFL)
Elected Mayor
R. T. Rybak
Democratic (DFL)

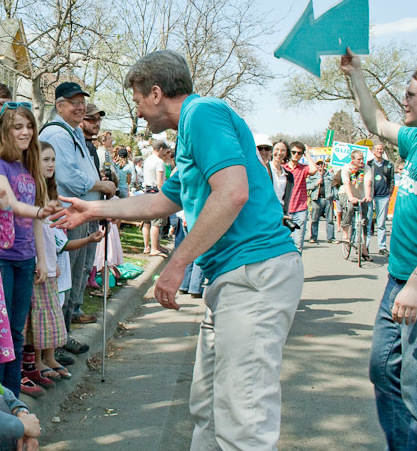
Rybak campaigning

The 2009 Minneapolis mayoral election was held on November 3, 2009, to elect the Mayor of Minneapolis for a four-year term. Incumbent R. T. Rybak won re-election for a third term in the first round with 73.6% of the vote.

This was the first mayoral election in the city's history to use instant-runoff voting, popularly known as ranked choice voting. Voters had the option of ranking up to three candidates. Municipal elections in Minnesota are nonpartisan, although candidates were able to identify with a political party on the ballot.

== Political party endorsements ==
Party	Candidate
Minneapolis DFL	R. T. Rybak
Fifth Congressional District Independence Party of Minnesota	Papa John Kolstad
Minneapolis City Republican Committee	Papa John Kolstad

== Results ==
Minneapolis mayoral election, 2009
Political party/principle	Candidate	% 1st Choice	Round 1
DFL	R. T. Rybak (incumbent)	73.60	33,234
Independent Civic Leader	Papa John Kolstad	10.97	4,953
DFL	Al Flowers	3.98	1,795
DFL	Dick Franson	3.50	1,579
Libertarian Party of Minnesota	Christopher Clark	2.96	1,337
Socialist Workers Party	Tom Fiske	1.44	650
Is Awesome	Joey Lombard	0.98	444
Social Entrepreneurship	James R. Everett	0.79	357
New Dignity Party	Bill McGaughey	0.51	232
Moderate Progressive Censored	Bob Carney Jr.	0.50	228
Edgertonite National Party	John Charles Wilson	0.30	137
N/A	Write-in	0.47	211
Threshold: 22,579; Valid: 45,157; Undervotes: 811; Turnout: 45,968 (19.64%); Registered: 234,028

== See also ==
- 2009 Minneapolis municipal elections
