= 2009 Minneapolis municipal election =

- November 3, 2009

A general election was held in Minneapolis on November 3, 2009. Minneapolis's mayor was up for election as well as all the seats on the City Council, the two elected seats on the Board of Estimate and Taxation, and all the seats on the Park and Recreation Board. This was the first election held in Minneapolis that used ranked choice voting, a collective term for instant-runoff voting and the single transferable vote.

Because city voters approved a city charter change by referendum in 2006 to use a ranked choice voting system, Minneapolis did not hold a primary election on September 8, the 2009 date for primaries in Minnesota.

There was a lawsuit in court to prevent the voting change; it lost by summary judgment in the first court, was appealed directly to the Minnesota Supreme Court, where it also lost. One person active in the lawsuit filed as a candidate but did not campaign; allegedly this was to give him legal standing to sue after the election.

== Mayor ==
Incumbent Democratic–Farmer–Labor Mayor R. T. Rybak announced on January 13, 2009, that he would be running for re-election. 11 candidates were on the ballot.

Previously mentioned as possible candidates for Mayor were Bob Miller, the director of the Minneapolis Neighborhood Revitalization Program (NRP), Minneapolis City Council members Gary Schiff and Ralph Remington, Minneapolis Park Board President Tom Nordyke, former City Council president Jackie Cherryhomes, and Hennepin County Commissioner Peter McLaughlin; none of them ended up running.

== City Council ==
All 13 seats on the Minneapolis City Council were up for election.

== Board of Estimate and Taxation ==
The two elected members of the Board of Estimate and Taxation were up for election. Incumbent Carol Becker was re-elected in the first round with 52.1% of first-choice votes. As no other candidate achieved the threshold to be elected the second member, several rounds of vote transfers were necessary. David Wheeler was elected in the fifth round after the remaining candidates were defeated.

Members were elected citywide via the single transferable vote.

=== Party endorsements ===
Party	Candidate
Minneapolis DFL	Carol Becker
Fifth Congressional District Independence Party of Minnesota	Michael Martens
Minneapolis City Republican Committee	Michael Martens

=== Results ===
Candidate	% 1st Choice	Round 1	Round 2	Round 3	Round 4	Round 5	% Final
Carol Becker	52.13	16,728	10,697.5560	10,697.5560	10,697.5560	10,697.5560	33.64
David Wheeler	19.03	6,107	7,239.6910	7,490.0575	8,107.4270	8,107.4270	25.27
Phil Willkie	9.19	2,950	3,527.1605	3,732.4080	4,098.4360	4,098.4360	12.77
DeWayne Townsend	7.24	2,323	3,231.4600	3,364.4975	3,674.0740	3,674.0740	11.45
Michael Martens	8.66	2,778	3,120.8355	3,273.4310			
James Elliot Swartwood	3.04	975	1,160.6575				
Write-ins	0.70	225	241.5830				
Exhausted ballots			2867.0565	3528.0500	5508.5070	5508.5070	17.17
Threshold		10,696					
Valid votes		32,086					
Undervotes		13,882					
Turnout	19.64	45,968					
Registered voters		234,028					
Source: Minneapolis Elections & Voter Services

== Park and Recreation Board ==
The nine members of the Park and Recreation Board were up for election. Three members were elected from one citywide, at-large district via the single transferable vote and six from single-member districts via instant-runoff voting.

=== Party endorsements ===
Party	At-large	District 1	District 3	District 4	District 6
Minneapolis DFL	Mary Merrill Anderson	Liz Wielinski	Scott Vreeland	Anita Tabb	Brad Bourn
Minneapolis DFL	John Erwin	Liz Wielinski	Scott Vreeland	Anita Tabb	Brad Bourn
Minneapolis DFL	Tom Nordyke	Liz Wielinski	Scott Vreeland	Anita Tabb	Brad Bourn
Fifth District Green Party	Annie Young				
Fifth Congressional District Independence Party of Minnesota	Dave Wahlstedt				
Minneapolis City Republican Committee	Dave Wahlstedt				

=== Results ===
==== At-large ====
Candidate	% 1st Choice	Round 1	Round 2	Round 3	Round 4	Round 5	Round 6	% Final
Bob Fine	22.07	8,089	8,193	8,363	8,708	9,329	9,329	25.45
Annie Young	18.94	6,941	7,062	7,490	7,741	8,371	8,371	22.84
John Erwin	17.39	6,376	6,514	6,635	6,841	7,733	7,733	21.10
Mary Merrill Anderson	14.92	5,394	5,470	5,913	6,096	6,810	6,810	18.58
Tom Nordyke	10.14	3,716	3,787	3,885	4,118			
David Wahlstedt	7.66	2,807	2,888	2,991				
Nancy Bernard	5.52	2,024	2,125					
John Butler	3.04	1,114						
Write-ins	0.53	194						
Exhausted ballots			616	1,378	3,151	4,412	4,412	12.04
Threshold		9,164						
Valid votes		36,655						
Undervotes		9,313						
Turnout	19.64	45,968						
Registered voters		234,028						
Source: Minneapolis Elections & Voter Services

==== District 1 ====
Candidate	% 1st Choice	Round 1
Liz Wielinski	74.20	4,335
Bernie Kunza	15.56	909
John Malone	9.67	565
Write-ins	0.56	33
Threshold		2,922
Valid votes		5,842
Undervotes		1,065
Turnout		6,907
Source: Minneapolis Elections & Voter Services

==== District 2 ====
Candidate	% 1st Choice	Round 1
Jon Olson	56.35	2,874
Michael Guest	42.80	2,183
Write-ins	0.84	43
Threshold		2,551
Valid votes		5,100
Undervotes		844
Turnout		5,944
Source: Minneapolis Elections & Voter Services

==== District 3 ====
Candidate	% 1st Choice	Round 1
Scott Vreeland	72.35	3,430
Mike Wendorf	26.17	1,239
Write-ins	1.48	67
Threshold		2,369
Valid votes		4,736
Undervotes		1,424
Turnout		6,160
Source: Minneapolis Elections & Voter Services

==== District 4 ====
Candidate	% 1st Choice	Round 1
Anita Tabb	97.45	5,012
Write-ins	2.55	131
Threshold		2,572
Valid votes		5,143
Undervotes		2,246
Turnout		7,389
Source: Minneapolis Elections & Voter Services

==== District 5 ====
Candidate	% 1st Choice	Round 1	Round 2	% Final
Carol Kummer	37.77	2,964	3,620	46.13
Jason Stone	35.52	2,788	3,271	41.68
Steve Barland	19.64	1,541		
Dan Peterson	4.70	369		
McLain Looney	1.92	151		
Write-ins	0.45	35		
Exhausted ballots			957	12.19
Threshold		3,925		
Valid votes		7,848		
Undervotes		1,534		
Turnout		9,382		
Source: Minneapolis Elections & Voter Services

==== District 6 ====
Candidate	% 1st Choice	Round 1	Round 2	% Final
Brad Bourn	48.16	4,023	4,300	51.47
Meg Forney	36.39	3,040	3,506	41.97
Steven Jecha	11.71	978		
Geneva Hanvik	3.32	277		
Write-ins	0.43	36		
Exhausted ballots			548	6.56
Threshold		4,178		
Valid votes		8,354		
Undervotes		1,832		
Turnout		10,186		
Source: Minneapolis Elections & Voter Services

== See also ==
2009 Minneapolis mayoral election

2009 Minneapolis City Council election
