= Peter McLaughlin (politician) =

American politician and educator

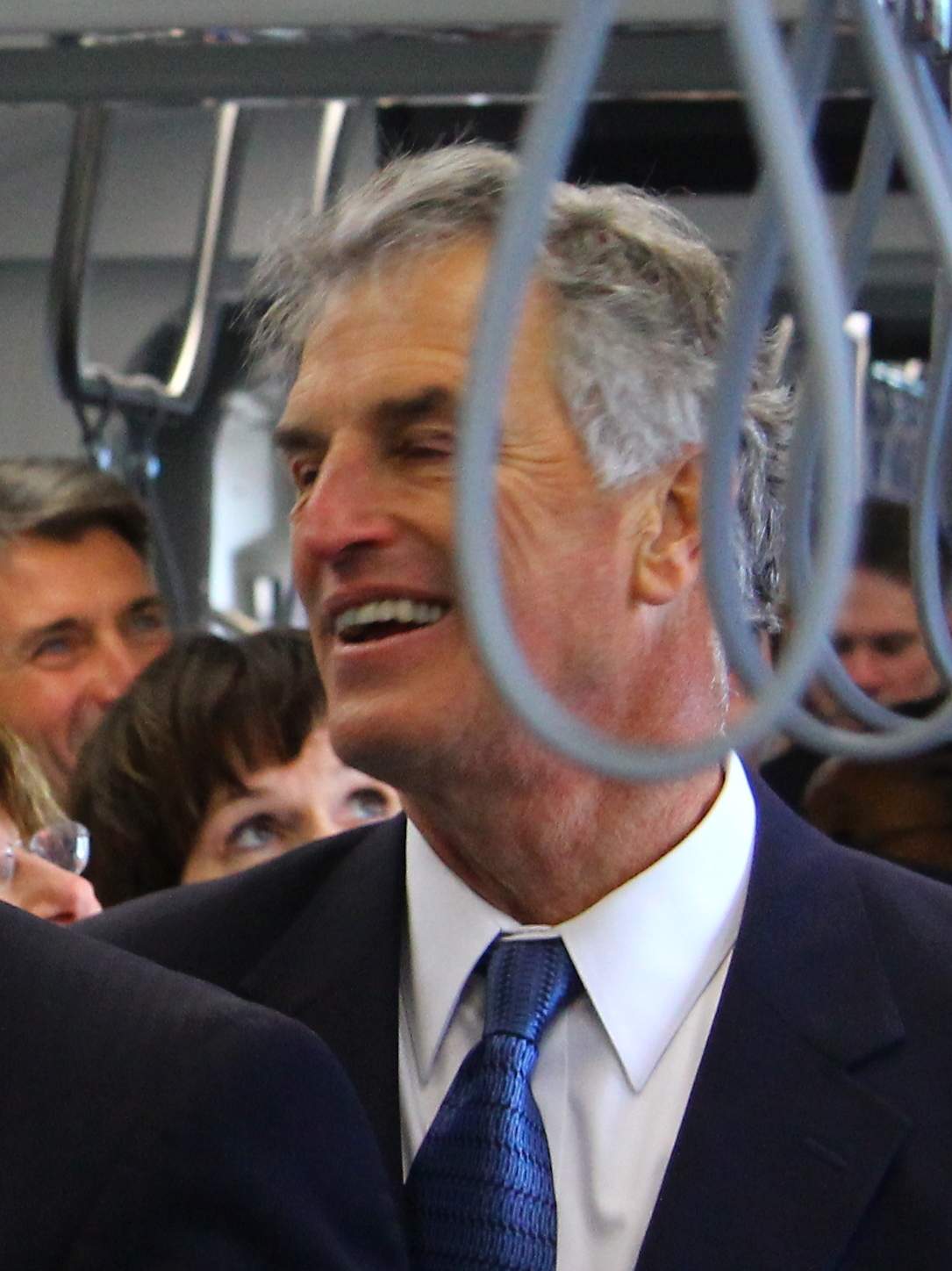
- McLaughlin in 2012

Member of the Hennepin County Board of Commissioners from the 4th district
- In office 1991–2018
- Succeeded by: Angela Conley

Member of the Minnesota House of Representatives from the 60B district
- In office January 7, 1985 – January 6, 1991
- Preceded by: Janet H. Clark
- Succeeded by: Linda Wejcman

Personal details
- Born: August 8, 1949 (age 76) Corry, Pennsylvania, U.S.
- Party: Democratic (DFL)
- Spouse(s): Sara Meyer (div. 2002) Nancy Hylde
- Children: 1
- Education: Princeton University (BA); University of Minnesota (MPA)
- Occupation: Politician, educator

Peter McLaughlin (born August 8, 1949) is an American retired politician and educator. He served on the Hennepin County Board of Commissioners from 1991 to 2018 and ran for mayor of Minneapolis in the 2005 election.

== Early life and education ==
McLaughlin was born in Corry, Pennsylvania. He received his bachelor's degree from Princeton University in 1971 and his master's degree from Humphrey School of Public Affairs in 1977. McLaughlin taught at Metropolitan State University and lived in Minneapolis, Minnesota.

== Political career ==
McLaughlin served on the Hennepin County Commission from 1991 to 2018 and was a Democrat. He also served on the Minnesota Council on Black Minnesotans. McLaughlin served in the Minnesota House of Representatives from 1985 to 1990.

In 2018, McLaughlin lost to political newcomer Angela Conley.
