= Q Monthly =

Defunct LGBT publication

- Cover of the November 1998 issue.
- Type: Monthly newspaper
- Circulation: 25,000

Q Monthly was an LGBT news and features publication produced in the Twin Cities from 1994 to 1998. Billed as "the publication for gays, lesbians and bisexuals" in Minneapolis-St. Paul, it first appeared on July 6, 1994, as an insert inside the alternative weekly Twin Cities Reader. Q Monthly won several Vice Versa awards, given to outstanding LGBT publications nationwide. Originally the publication was owned by Twin Cities Reader owner American City Business Journals, but was later bought by Stern Publishing.

== History ==
In February 1995, the publication was launched as a standalone free publication with its own distribution by then Twin Cities Reader publisher R.T. Rybak and Twin Cities Reader editor David Carr. R.T. Rybak later became mayor of Minneapolis and David Carr went on to be a well-known reporter and columnist at the New York Times. Q Monthly's editor was Rick Nelson, and its executive editor was Claude Peck. It was launched soon after another LGBT newspaper, Equal Time, folded.

In March 1997, Stern Publishing (publisher of The Village Voice) bought the Twin Cities Reader (it had bought competing alt-weekly City Pages a month earlier). The Twin Cities Reader ceased publication, but Q Monthly, which was included in the sale, continued to be published by City Pages under editor Joel Hoekstra until it was discontinued in late 1998 by City Pages publisher Mark Bartel, despite being profitable. Q Monthly generated $200,000 in revenues in its final year.

== Content ==
The monthly, with a circulation of 25,000, included news, interviews and opinion as well as features on lifestyle, arts, entertainment and personalities. Issues, printed on newsprint in tabloid size, varied in size from 16 to 32 pages.

The publication included magazine-style cover stories, "Hit and Run" (a blind-item gossip column), "Person, Place and Thing," an events calendar and a monthly Q & A. Regular contributors included Ken Darling, David Anger, Cynthia Scott, Nelson, Peck, and Hoekstra. Cover stories reported on influential LGBT Twin Citians, "Straights We Love," neighborhoods with large LGBT populations, polar explorer Ann Bancroft, the myth of gay affluence, and the high cost of living with AIDS.

== Archived copies ==
Full runs of the publication are held at the Quatrefoil Library in Minneapolis, the Tretter Collection at the University of Minnesota, and the Minneapolis History Collection at Hennepin County Library's downtown Minneapolis location.
