= Richard Erdall =

American politician (1933–2018)

Richard M. Erdall
- Erdall C.1973

40th Mayor of Minneapolis
- In office December 31, 1973
- Preceded by: Charles Stenvig
- Succeeded by: Albert Hofstede

Member of the Minneapolis City Council from the 13th ward
- In office 1967–1974

Commissioner on the Minneapolis Park and Recreation Board In office 1965-1967

Personal details
- Born: January 13, 1933 Minneapolis, Minnesota, U.S.
- Died: July 3, 2018 (aged 85) Minneapolis, Minnesota, U.S.
- Party: Republican
- Children: 3

Richard M. Erdall (January 13, 1933 – July 3, 2018) was an American politician. He was the 40th mayor of Minneapolis, Minnesota, serving for one day, on December 31, 1973; as such, he is the shortest-serving mayor of the city. Before that, he was alderman for the City's 13th Ward and the president of the Minneapolis City Council. In 1965, Erdall was elected to the Minneapolis Park Board. On January 13, 1967 (his 34th birthday), he was appointed 13th Ward alderman to fill the vacancy caused by the election of John Warren Johnson to the Minnesota legislature. Erdall was elected to the council in 1967 and reelected in 1969 and 1971. He was elected president of the city council on July 7, 1969, and reelected in 1971. On August 13, 1971, Erdall was ousted as president when a member of his caucus sided with the DFL to elect himself president. On January 28, 1972, Erdall was restored to the presidency, which he held until January 2, 1974. He was defeated for reelection as alderman in November 1973. The opportunity to serve as mayor arose because the incumbent mayor, Charles Stenvig, a former police inspector who had also been defeated for reelection, resigned on his final day in office to become acting Chief of Police.

Erdall was a member of the Republican Party, and is to date the last Republican to serve as mayor of Minneapolis or as council president. In 1976, Erdall received the Independent-Republican nomination in the contest to represent Minnesota's 5th Congressional district, which was then represented by seven-term incumbent (and future Minneapolis mayor) Donald M. Fraser. He received less than 26% of the vote, as Fraser was reelected. He was born in Minneapolis and died there on July 3, 2018, at the age of 85, survived by his children Richard, Kristen, and Susan.

Political offices
Preceded by Charles Stenvig	40th Mayor of Minneapolis; December 31, 1973	Succeeded by Albert Hofstede
