= Orlando C. Merriman =

American lawyer, politician and businessman (1827–1906)

Orlando Crosby Merriman, Sr.
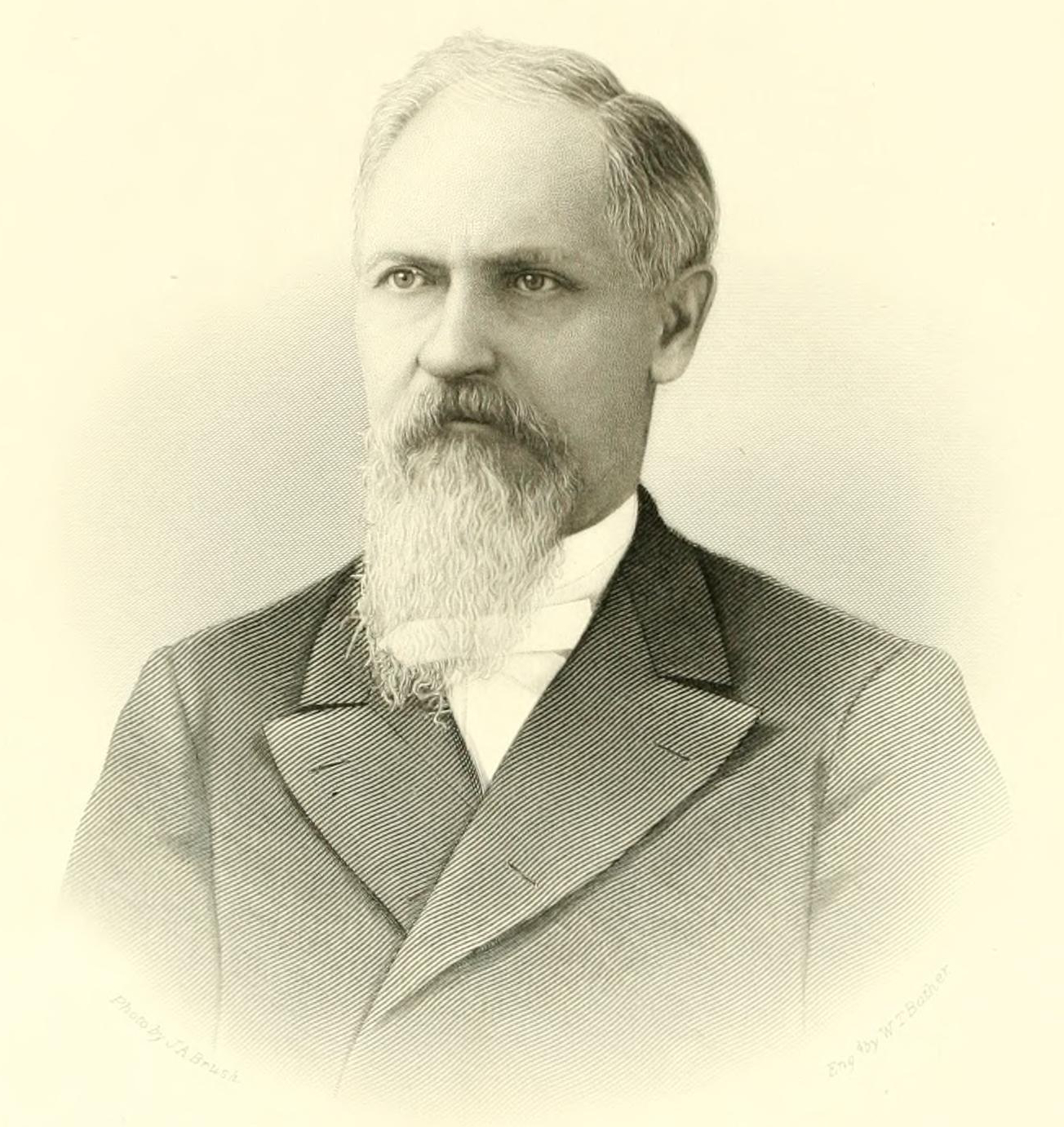
- Merriman c. 1893

8th Mayor of Minneapolis
- In office April 13, 1875 – April 11, 1876
- Preceded by: Eugene McLanahan Wilson
- Succeeded by: A. A. Ames

Mayor of St. Anthony
- In office April 10, 1866 – April 7, 1868
- In office April 11, 1864 – April 7, 1865
- In office April 8, 1861 – April 1863

Personal details
- Born: July 27, 1827 St. Lawrence County, New York, U.S.
- Died: August 2, 1906 (aged 79) Minneapolis, Minnesota, U.S.
- Resting place: Lakewood Cemetery
- Party: Democratic
- Spouse: Rosannah Herring

Orlando Crosby Merriman, Sr. (July 27, 1827 – August 2, 1906) was a lawyer, businessman, and Democratic politician who served five terms as the mayor of St. Anthony, Minnesota and one term as the eighth mayor of Minneapolis.

== Early life and career ==
Merriman was born in the town of Somerville in St. Lawrence County, New York, to Orramel and Amanda Merriman. He attended local schools and went to college at Gouverneur Wesleyan Seminary, attending his classes in the spring and fall while working as a schoolteacher in the winter and helping with his family farm during the summer. After graduating in 1850, he began to read law under Charles Anthony and was admitted to the bar in 1854.

Merriman married Rosannah Herring on April 3, 1854, and the two soon relocated to Janesville, Wisconsin. Merriman entered into a law practice with David Noggle, Amos Pritchard, and John M. Berry. He later moved to Jefferson, Wisconsin, and began a law firm with the state's first lieutenant governor John Edwin Holmes. While living in Jefferson, he also became active in local politics and served as the local superintendent of schools, as the clerk of the board of supervisors, and as postmaster. In 1859, Merriman moved to St. Anthony, Minnesota to continue his legal career.

== Life in Minnesota ==
Just a week before the outbreak of the American Civil War, Merriman was elected the mayor of St. Anthony, Minnesota. After the war began, Merriman worked to ensure the town provided soldiers for the war. He was re-elected in 1862 but left to serve in the 6th Minnesota Volunteer Infantry Regiment where he had been named captain. His unit served in the Dakota War of 1862 and was present at the Battle of Birch Coulee and Battle of Wood Lake. In June 1864, Merriman resigned his commission due to poor health.

Merriman returned to his legal and political career. He formed a law firm with William Lochren and was re-elected mayor of St. Anthony in 1866 and 1867. In 1864, he was appointed by the state legislature (with John Sargent Pillsbury and John Nicols) to help the University of Minnesota deal with a financial crisis. Merriman became involved in various lumber companies in the area and helped construct a lumber mill on Saint Anthony Falls. In 1875, he was elected mayor of Minneapolis with the support of both parties. In 1881, he helped found the First Unitarian Society of Minneapolis.

In 1891, he left the lumber business and became involved in banking, working with the Northwestern National Bank and Commercial Bank of Minneapolis. In 1897, he was named a Referee in Bankruptcy.

Merriman died on August 2, 1906, in Minneapolis. He was buried in Lakewood Cemetery.

== Electoral history ==
- St. Anthony Mayoral Election, 1861
  - Orlando Crosby Merriman 419
  - E. W. Cutter 169
- St. Anthony Mayoral Election, 1862
  - Orlando Crosby Merriman 325
- St. Anthony Mayoral Election, 1864
  - Orlando Crosby Merriman 261
  - B. B. Meeker 1
- St. Anthony Mayoral Election, 1864
  - William Winford Wales 182
  - Orlando Crosby Merriman 130
- St. Anthony Mayoral Election, 1866
  - Orlando Crosby Merriman 244
  - Horatio P. Van Cleve 214
- St. Anthony Mayoral Election, 1867
  - Orlando Crosby Merriman 316
  - David A. Secombe 189
- Minneapolis Mayoral Election, 1875
  - Orlando Crosby Merriman 3,855
  - Write-Ins and Scattering 40

Political offices
Preceded by George A. Brackett	Mayor of Minneapolis; 1875 – 1876	Succeeded by A. A. Ames
