= 2001 Minneapolis municipal election =

- November 6, 2001
- City Council results by ward

The 2001 Minneapolis municipal elections in the U.S. state of Minnesota held a general municipal election on 6 November, 2001. Voter turnout was 40.2%.

== Results ==
=== Mayor ===
Incumbent mayor Sharon Sayles Belton was running for re-election. She was defeated by the development director for Minneapolis's downtown council, R.T. Rybak.

Candidate	Votes	%
R. T. Rybak	57,739	64.69
Sharon Sayles Belton	30,896	34.61
Write-in	625	0.70
Total	89,260	100.00
Source: City of Minneapolis

=== City Council ===
Party	Candidates	Votes		Seats
Party	Candidates	No.	%	Seats
Democratic–Farmer–Labor Party (DFL)	18	63,767	75.00	10
Green Party of Minnesota	4	8,318	9.78	2
Independent	3	11,178	13.15	1
Republican Party of Minnesota	1	1,229	1.45	0
Write-in		529	0.62	0
Total		85,021	100.00	13
Source: Minneapolis Elections & Voter Services
