= David P. Jones =

American banker and politician (1860–1927)

David Percy Jones
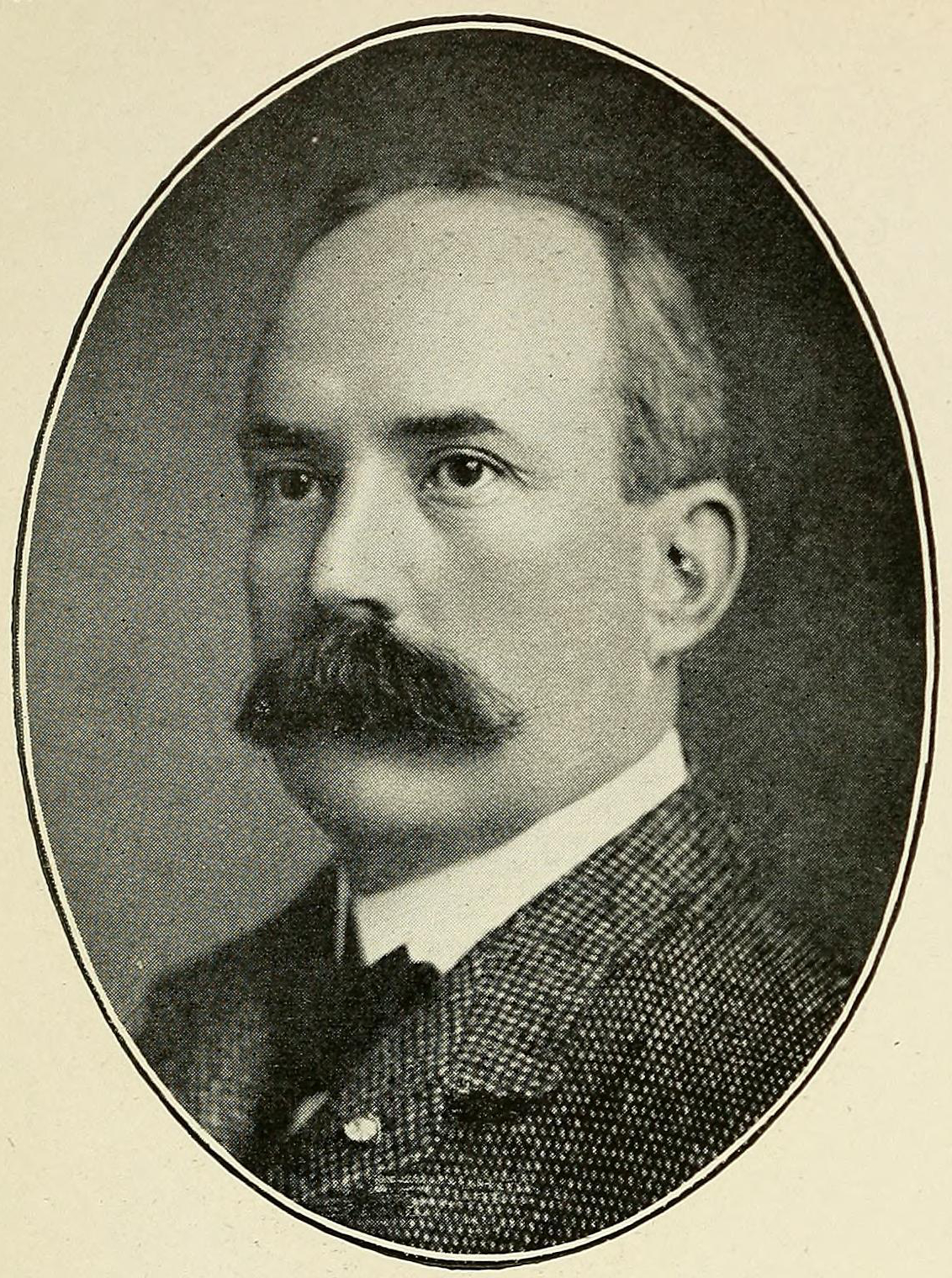
- Jones c. 1903

21st & 23rd Mayor of Minneapolis
- In office January 2, 1905 – January 7, 1907
- Preceded by: J. C. Haynes
- Succeeded by: J. C. Haynes
- In office August 27, 1902 – January 5, 1903
- Preceded by: A. A. Ames
- Succeeded by: J. C. Haynes

President of the Minneapolis City Council
- In office January 7, 1901 – August 27, 1902
- Preceded by: John Crosby
- Succeeded by: Fred M. Powers

Member of the Minneapolis City Council from the 5th Ward
- In office January 2, 1899 – August 27, 1902

Personal details
- Born: July 6, 1860 Minneapolis, Minnesota, U.S.
- Died: August 3, 1927 (aged 67) Minneapolis, Minnesota, U.S.
- Resting place: Lakewood Cemetery
- Party: Republican
- Parents: Edwin S. Jones (father); Harriet M. James (mother)
- Education: University of Minnesota
- Profession: Banker; Stockbroker

David Percy Jones (July 6, 1860 – August 3, 1927) was a banker and Republican politician who served as the 21st and 23rd mayor of Minneapolis.

== Life and career ==
Jones was born in Minneapolis, Minnesota to Edwin S. Jones and Harriet M. James. His father was a lawyer and judge who founded the Hennepin County Savings Bank and a mortgage investment firm. Jones attended Minneapolis Public Schools and the University of Minnesota, graduating in 1883 and working in his father's investment firm thereafter. In 1898, Jones was elected to the Minneapolis City Council; he served as the council's president beginning in 1900. When mayor A. A. Ames fled the city in 1902 to avoid prosecution for corruption, Jones became the city's acting mayor and enacted a series of reforms to rein in the liquor, gambling and prostitution businesses which had proliferated under Ames. While he did not stand for re-election in the fall of 1902, he ran again in 1904 and won a second term where he continued his reforms. He was defeated in his bid for re-election in 1906.

Jones died on August 3, 1927, at Abbot Hospital. He was buried in Lakewood Cemetery.

== Electoral history ==
- Minneapolis Mayoral Election, 1904
  - David Percy Jones 18,445
  - James C. Haynes 18,189
  - Milton K. Rogers 2,682
  - Charles M. Way 777
  - Benjamin Adolphus Frankford 296
- Minneapolis Mayoral Election, 1906
  - James C. Haynes 21,778
  - David Percy Jones 18,213
  - Milton K. Rogers 1,002

Political offices
Preceded by A. A. Ames	Mayor of Minneapolis; 1902 – 1903	Succeeded by J. C. Haynes
Preceded by J. C. Haynes	Mayor of Minneapolis; 1905 – 1907	Succeeded by J. C. Haynes
