= Wallace G. Nye =

American politician (1859–1926)

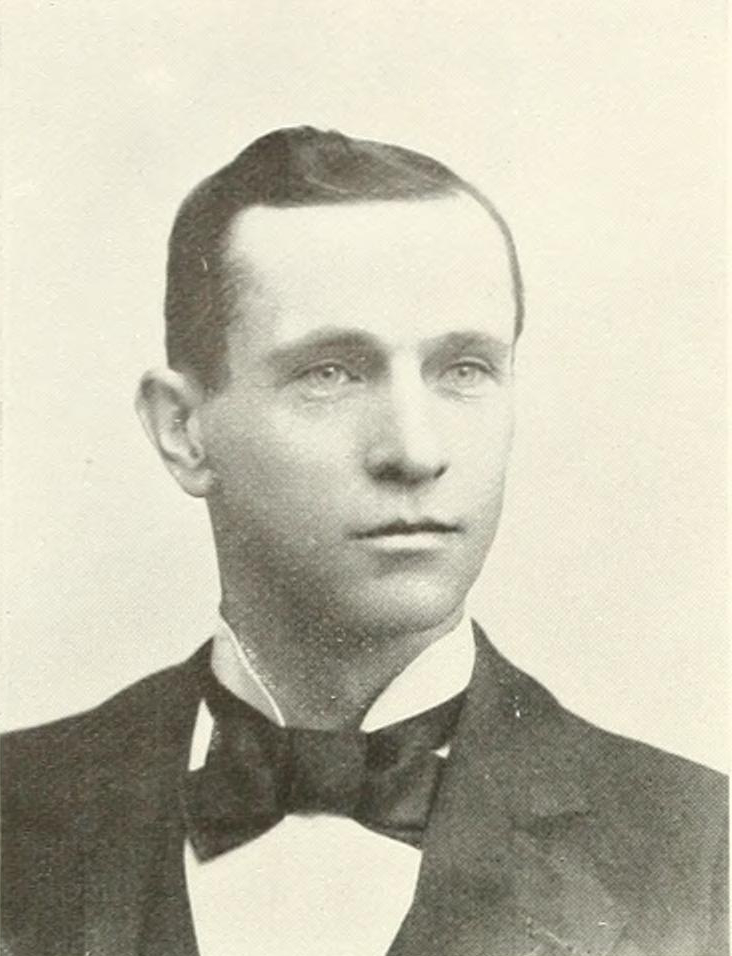
- Nye c. 1897

25th Mayor of Minneapolis
- In office 1913–1917
- Preceded by: J. C. Haynes
- Succeeded by: Thomas Van Lear

Personal details
- Born: Wallace George Nye; October 7, 1859 Hortonville, Wisconsin, U.S.
- Died: March 4, 1926 (aged 66) Minneapolis, Minnesota, U.S.
- Resting place: Lakewood Cemetery
- Party: Republican
- Education: University of Wisconsin–Oshkosh
- Profession: Educator, druggist

Wallace George Nye (October 7, 1859 – March 4, 1926) was the 25th mayor of Minneapolis, Minnesota from 1913 to 1917. His nephew was Gerald Nye, a U.S. Senator from North Dakota.

== Life and career ==
Nye was born in Hortonville, Wisconsin in 1859. He attended local schools and the University of Wisconsin–Oshkosh and spent several years after college working as a school principal. In 1881, he left for Chicago, Illinois to study pharmacy. Instead of returning home to Wisconsin after finishing, he decided to relocate to Minneapolis and began a drug business there. He also became active in local Republican politics, winning election as Minneapolis comptroller in 1892 to 1894 and also serving on the park board. In 1905, Nye was a leading member of the Minneapolis Public Affairs Committee, a non-governmental organization dedicated to the business and municipal affairs of the city.

He was elected mayor in 1912, defeating Democrat Charles Gould and Socialist Thomas Van Lear. During his term as mayor, Nye was involved in a controversy over the exhibition of the film The Birth of a Nation in Minneapolis. Nye opposed the showing of the film and stated he would put a stop to it, but a district court judge issued an injunction ordering Nye not to interfere. When that injunction was reversed just a week later, screenings of the film were stopped out of fear Nye would intervene. Nye eventually accepted a proposal to form a public censorship committee to review the film and to abide by their decision. When the committee met and a majority approved the film, Nye stood aside and let the film be shown.

Nye was defeated by Van Lear in the 1916 mayoral election, mainly due to a financial scandal involving financing of the city's streetcar system and Nye's supplying of police protection to scab workers during a general Teamsters strike.

Nye died at his home in Minneapolis on March 4, 1926. He is buried at Lakewood Cemetery in Minneapolis.
