= Arthur Naftalin =

American politician and academic (1917–2005)

- Naftalin in 1966

38th Mayor of Minneapolis
- In office July 3, 1961 – July 6, 1969
- Preceded by: P. Kenneth Peterson
- Succeeded by: Charles Stenvig

Personal details
- Born: June 28, 1917 Fargo, North Dakota, U.S.
- Died: May 16, 2005 (aged 87) Minneapolis, Minnesota, U.S.
- Party: Minnesota Democratic-Farmer-Labor Party
- Relatives: Mark Naftalin (son)
- Education: University of Minnesota Twin Cities
- Profession: academic, professor

Arthur Naftalin (June 28, 1917 – May 16, 2005) was an American political scientist and politician. A member of the Minnesota Democratic-Farmer-Labor Party (DFL), he served as mayor of Minneapolis from July 3, 1961, to July 6, 1969. He was the first Jewish mayor of Minneapolis.

== Early life ==
Naftalin was born in Fargo, North Dakota, one of four children of Sandel and Tillie Naftalin. He was married to Frances Healy Naftalin; among their children is Mark Naftalin, a musician who was inducted into the Rock and Roll Hall of Fame in 2015 as a member of the Paul Butterfield Blues Band. Their other notable children are David Michael Bismarck and Gail Marie Naftalin.

== University of Minnesota and Hubert Humphrey ==
Naftalin came to Minneapolis to attend the University of Minnesota, from which he received a Bachelor of Arts degree in 1939 and a PhD in 1948. His dissertation was a history of the Farmer-Labor Party of Minnesota. During this time, he became acquainted with Hubert Humphrey and helped Humphrey lead the merger of Minnesota's Democratic and Farmer-Labor parties into the DFL in 1944.

In 1945, Humphrey was elected mayor and Naftalin was appointed to work in his office. Naftalin later became a professor in the department of political science at the University of Minnesota. He served as commissioner of administration under Governor Orville L. Freeman.

== Mayor ==
In 1961, he won the first of his four two-year terms as mayor, defeating incumbent Republican Mayor P. Kenneth Peterson by a margin of 52.04% to 47.96%. He attended the 1963 March on Washington for Jobs and Freedom and was present at Martin Luther King Jr.'s "I Have a Dream" speech. He ran for the DFL endorsement for lieutenant governor in 1966. In 1967, he called in the National Guard to quell the 1967 Plymouth Avenue civil unrest. Naftalin declined to seek reelection in 1969, becoming the only mayor of Minneapolis in the period 1913–1979 who never resigned or lost an election. Naftalin was succeeded by Charlie Stenvig, a police officer with no previous political experience who promised a "law and order" approach to any future civil unrest.

== Life after leaving office ==
After leaving office, Naftalin became a professor in the department of public affairs at the University of Minnesota (now the Hubert H. Humphrey School of Public Affairs). In 1971, he joined the board of directors of the Citizens League, and served as president of the board in 1975–1976. From 1976 to 1987, he produced and hosted 500 installments of Minnesota Issues, a weekly public-affairs program on local public television station KTCA. In 1980 he produced, wrote, and narrated a series of one-hour television documentaries about former Minnesota governors. He retired in 1987.

On the morning of May 16, 2005, Naftalin struck his head in a fall, went into a coma, and died later in the day at Abbott Northwestern Hospital in Minneapolis. He donated his body to the University of Minnesota for research.

Political offices
| Preceded by P. Kenneth Peterson | Mayor of Minneapolis; 1961–1969 | Succeeded by Charles Stenvig |
