= Albert Hofstede =

American politician

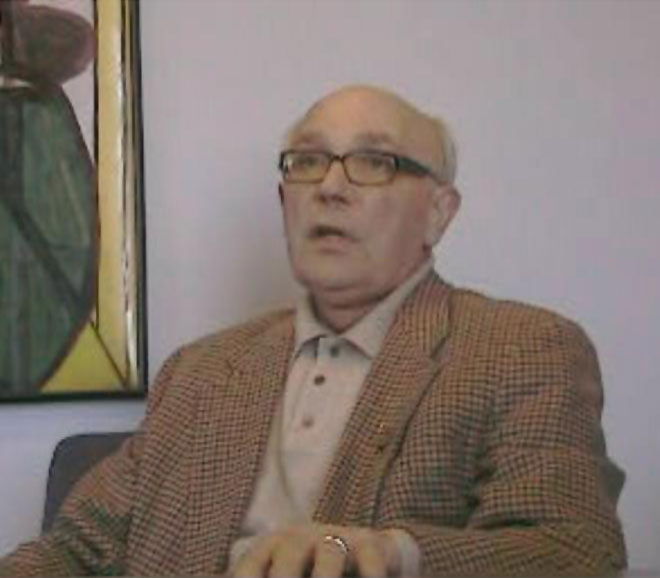
- Al Hofstede in 2008

41st & 43rd Mayor of Minneapolis
- In office January 1, 1974 – December 31, 1975
- Preceded by: Richard Erdall
- Succeeded by: Charles Stenvig
- In office January 1, 1978 – December 31, 1979
- Preceded by: Charles Stenvig
- Succeeded by: Donald M. Fraser

Personal details
- Born: September 25, 1940 Minneapolis, Minnesota, U.S.
- Died: September 3, 2016 (aged 75) Minneapolis, Minnesota, U.S.
- Party: Democratic-Farmer-Labor
- Spouse: Emma Hofstede
- Children: 2, including Emily Koski
- Education: University of St. Thomas
- Profession: Politician; advisor

Albert "Al" J. Hofstede (September 25, 1940 – September 3, 2016) was an American politician who served two non-consecutive terms as mayor of Minneapolis, Minnesota, both times representing the Minnesota Democratic-Farmer-Labor Party.

== Political career ==
Over the course of his career, Hofstede served Minnesota governor Karl Rolvaag, was a member of the Minneapolis City Council for four years, a chairperson of the Metropolitan Council from 1971 to 1973, and mayor of Minneapolis for two terms. His position as Metropolitan Council chairperson was granted by governor Wendell Anderson.

Hofstede was Minneapolis's first Roman Catholic mayor as well as its youngest at the time of his first election; his first term, as the city's 41st mayor, began on January 1, 1974, when he was 34 years old. The term ended on December 31, 1975, after he was defeated for reelection by independent Charles Stenvig, who had already been mayor from 1970 to 1973. In 1977 Hofstede defeated Stenvig to win another term (the 43rd), which ended on December 31, 1979.

During the years that Milwaukee Avenue, a two-block area of half-lot, almost identical houses, was threatened, Hofstede led the way to protect it. He led a tour of the area for residents, neighbors, activists and others. The area was eventually designated an historic district.

Later, Hofstede worked as an advisor at North State Advisors.

== Personal life ==
Hofstede was born in Minneapolis on September 25, 1940. He and his wife, Barb, had two children, Emily and Albert. Barb Hofstede died of breast cancer while their children were still young. Albert met and married his second wife, Emma Hofstede (née Hild), a schoolteacher and a nun.

Hofstede's daughter, Emily Koski, was elected to the Minneapolis City Council in 2021, representing Ward 11. His sister-in-law, Diane Hofstede, was elected to the Minneapolis Library Board and later to the Minneapolis City Council, representing Ward 3. Hofstede died on September 3, 2016, in Minneapolis at the age of 75. At the time he lived in Blaine.

Political offices
Preceded by Richard Erdall	41st Mayor of Minneapolis; 1974–1975	Succeeded by Charles Stenvig
Preceded by Charles Stenvig	43rd Mayor of Minneapolis; 1978–1979	Succeeded by Donald M. Fraser
