= J. C. Haynes =

American politician (1848–1913)

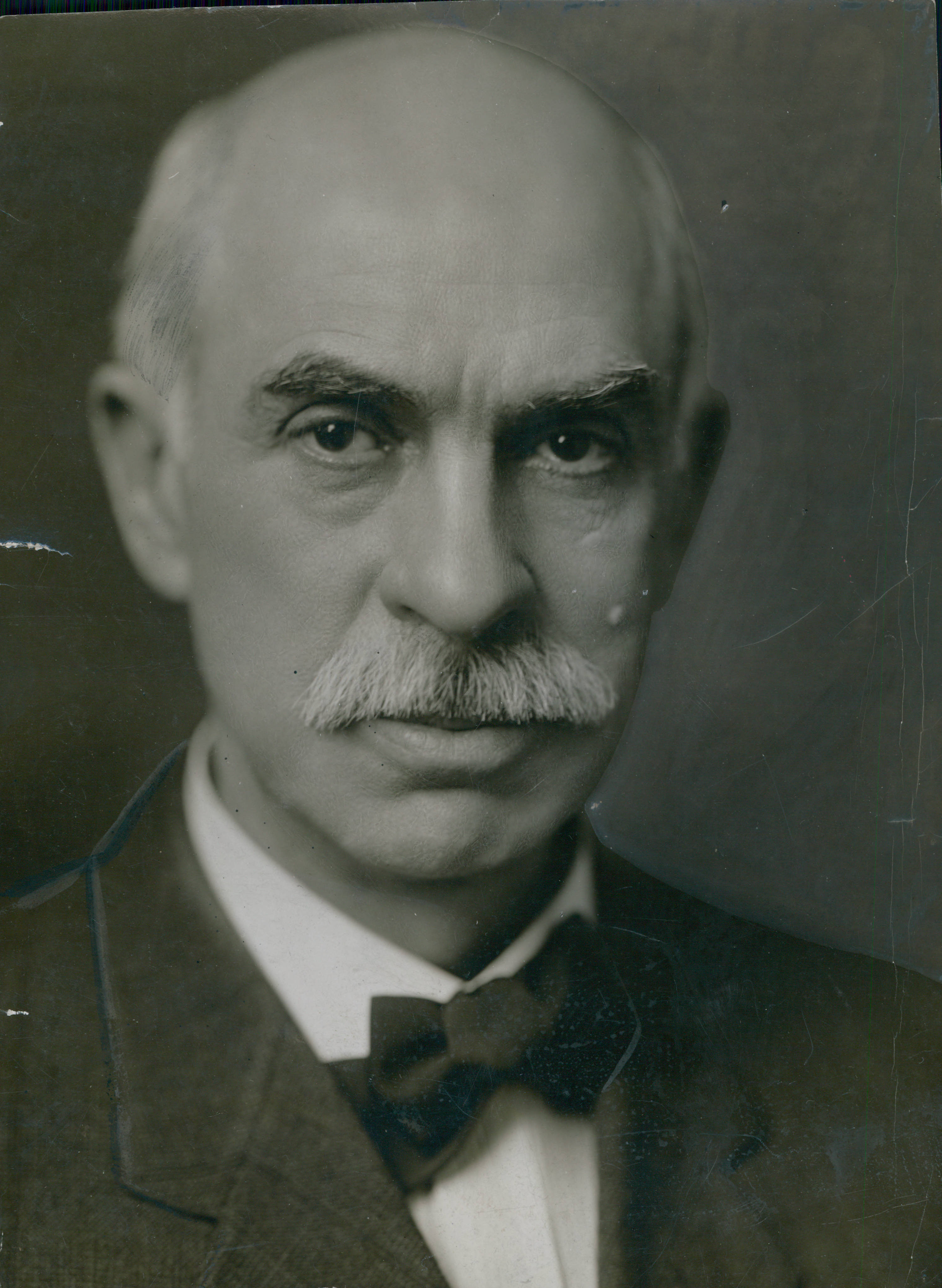

24th Mayor of Minneapolis
- In office 1907–1913
- Preceded by: David P. Jones
- Succeeded by: Wallace G. Nye

22nd Mayor of Minneapolis
- In office 1903–1905
- Preceded by: David P. Jones
- Succeeded by: David P. Jones

Personal details
- Born: James Clark Haynes; September 22, 1848 Baldwinsville, New York, U.S.
- Died: April 14, 1913 (aged 64) Minneapolis, Minnesota, U.S.
- Resting place: Lakewood Cemetery
- Party: Democratic
- Education: Columbia Law School
- Profession: Lawyer; politician

James Clark Haynes (September 22, 1848 – April 14, 1913) was a lawyer and Democratic politician who served as the 22nd and 24th mayor of Minneapolis.

== Life and career ==
James Clark Haynes was born on September 22, 1848, near Baldwinsville, New York, to Eliza Ann (née Clark) and James Haynes. He was largely raised on the family's farm. At age 11 he began attending local schools (future Minnesota attorney general Henry W. Childs was a classmate and friend). After graduating, he worked as a teacher for several years while still helping with the family's farm. In 1871, he began college at Onondaga Valley Academy and Cazenovia Seminary. He went on to read law and completed some final studies at Columbia Law School, gaining admission to the bar in 1875. He initially practiced law in Buffalo, New York and Eau Claire, Wisconsin before relocating to Minneapolis in 1878.

After arriving in Minneapolis, Haynes developed a law practice specializing in business law. He was also a backer and president of the American District Telegraph Company of Minneapolis from 1883 to 1906. Haynes also became involved with the local Democratic party. He was elected as an alderman in 1890; in 1892 he was the Democratic nominee for mayor but was defeated. In 1902 he ran again for mayor, winning by a significant margin. Haynes was narrowly defeated in his re-election campaign in 1904, but won again in 1906 as well as 1908 and 1910. As a member of the city council and mayor, Haynes was involved in efforts to create a water reservoir in Columbia Heights, Minnesota, the continuing development of the city's streetcar network, and working to restore public trust and eliminate corruption in the wake of former mayor A. A. Ames.

Haynes died on April 14, 1913, in Minneapolis. He was buried in Lakewood Cemetery.

== Electoral history ==
- Minneapolis Mayoral Election, 1892
  - William H. Eustis 17,910
  - James C. Haynes 15,728
  - Charles M. Way 1,842
  - Theodore F. Stark 1,665
- Minneapolis Mayoral Election, 1902
  - James C. Haynes 20,345
  - Fred M. Powers 14,437
  - William B. Hammond 704
  - Charles D. Raymer 354
- Minneapolis Mayoral Election, 1904
  - David Percy Jones 18,445
  - James C. Haynes 18,189
  - Milton K. Rogers 2,682
  - Charles M. Way 777
  - Benjamin Adolphus Frankford 296
- Minneapolis Mayoral Election, 1906
  - James C. Haynes 21,778
  - David Percy Jones 18,213
  - Milton K. Rogers 1,002
- Minneapolis Mayoral Election, 1908
  - James C. Haynes 19,814
  - Charles H. Huhn 19,558
  - J. D. Engle 1,322
  - W. L. Beeman 977
- Minneapolis Mayoral Election, 1910
  - James C. Haynes 12,788
  - W. E. Satterlee 12,754
  - Thomas Van Lear 11,601
  - Frank H. Mellen 617

Political offices
Preceded by David P. Jones	Mayor of Minneapolis; 1903 – 1905	Succeeded by David P. Jones
Preceded by David P. Jones	Mayor of Minneapolis; 1907 – 1913	Succeeded by Wallace G. Nye
