= Annie Young =

American politician

Annie Young was an American politician and member of the Green Party of Minnesota in Minneapolis, Minnesota. She was an elected at-large member of the Minneapolis Park and Recreation Board. Young ran for Minnesota State Auditor in the 2010 election.

On November 8, 2005, Young, Tom Nordyke, and Mary Merrill Anderson were elected as at-large commissioners of the Minneapolis Park and Recreation Board. She was endorsed by the Green Party of Minnesota. Young ran for re-election in the 2009 Minneapolis municipal election. She was one of two elected Green Party members in the Minneapolis city government; the other is city council member Cam Gordon.

Young, who had been suffering from chronic obstructive pulmonary disease, died on January 22, 2018, aged 75 years.
