= Alvaren Allen =

American businessman and politician

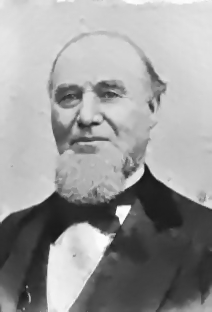

Mayor of St. Anthony, Minnesota
- In office April 9, 1856 – August 23, 1856
- Preceded by: Henry T. Welles
- Succeeded by: David A. Secombe

Personal details
- Born: September 25, 1822; Morristown, New York
- Died: November 8, 1907 (aged 85); St. Paul, Minnesota
- Spouse: Louisa Chase Sowles

Alvaren Allen (September 25, 1822 – November 8, 1907) was a businessman and Democratic politician who served as the second mayor of St. Anthony, Minnesota.

== Life and career ==
Alvaren Allen was born in 1822 to Aaron and Elizabeth (née Gould) Allen. In 1837, he moved to Fort Atkinson, Wisconsin with his father and later attended school in Beloit, Wisconsin. After working in the Milwaukee area for a brief period he decided to move west. In 1851 he left for Dubuque, Iowa and later took a steamship up river to St. Paul, Minnesota.

Allen gradually built a very successful stagecoach business with lines running across Minnesota and into Wisconsin. In 1856 he was elected the second mayor of St. Anthony, Minnesota (though he resigned midway through his term). In 1869, Allen sold his stagecoach business and invested in railroads including the Northern Pacific Railway and the St. Paul and Duluth Railroad. He purchased the Merchants Hotel in St. Paul.

In September 1884, Allen was the highest bidder for the right to exhibit the Lakota chief Sitting Bull. He organized a 15 city tour which kicked off at his hotel in St. Paul. This took place a year before he toured with the Buffalo Bill's Wild West show.

Allen lived in St. Paul and operated the Merchants Hotel until shortly before his death in 1908.
