= Citizens League =

American nonpartisan think tank

- Founded: 1952
- Type: nonpartisan think tank
- Headquarters: St. Paul, MN, United States
- Revenue: $1,210,042 (2019)
- Expenses: $1,194,137 (2019)
- Website: www.citizensleague.org

The Citizens League is a nonpartisan think tank based in the Minneapolis-St. Paul metropolitan area of Minnesota. It was established in 1952 as a good government advocacy and policy group.

The first Citizens League board of directors was elected on February 14, 1952; the League's first president was Stuart Leck. Dues were $5.

In the past 68 years, the Citizens League has had only nine executive directors: Ray Black (1952–1958); Verne Johnson (1958–1967); Ted Kolderie (1967–1980); Curt Johnson (1980–1991); Lyle Wray (1992–2003); Sean Kershaw (2003–December 1, 2017); Pahoua Yang Hoffman (2017- May 15, 2020); Kate Cimino (2020 – September 2023); and Jake Loesch (2023–Present).

== Records ==
Records of the Citizens League are available for research use. They include minutes (1971-1981), correspondence, reports (1958-1984), subject files, notebooks, financial information, and printed materials.
