= William W. Wales =

American politician

William Winford Wales

Mayor of St. Anthony, Minnesota
- In office April 7, 1857 – April 6, 1858
- Preceded by: David A. Secombe
- Succeeded by: Orrin Curtis
- In office April 7, 1865 – April 10, 1866
- Preceded by: Orlando C. Merriman
- Succeeded by: Orlando C. Merriman

Personal details
- Born: March 14, 1818; Iredell County, North Carolina
- Died: August 23, 1902 (aged 84); Asheville, North Carolina

William Winford Wales (March 14, 1818 – August 23, 1902) was a Minnesota politician who served as a member of the Territorial Legislature and twice as the mayor of St. Anthony, Minnesota.

== Life and career ==
Wales was born in Iredell County, North Carolina in 1818. In 1845, he relocated to Indiana to teach school. While there he married Catherine Bundy in 1848. The two moved to Minnesota in 1851, settling in St. Anthony. Wales was the first Quaker to settle in Minnesota Territory. Wales held a number of odd jobs as a wallpaper hanger, bookseller and gardener. In 1856, he was elected mayor of St. Anthony. Wales also served on the board of education. The next year he was elected to the Minnesota Territory Legislature in a special election. After a brief period in Mississippi, he returned to St. Anthony where he served as city clerk and postmaster. In 1865 he was re-elected mayor of the city for a second time. Later in his life he did missionary work in North Carolina. He died in Asheville, North Carolina in 1902.
