= Merchants Manor Hotel =

Hotel in Cornwall, England

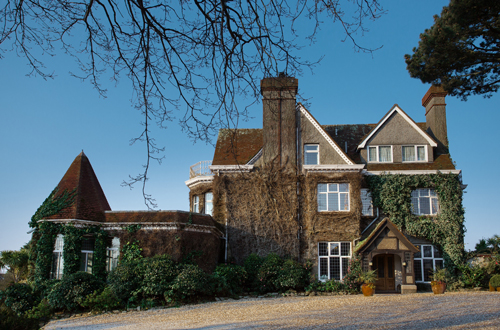
- Picture of Merchants Manor Hotel

- Location within Cornwall

General information
- Type: Hotel
- Location: 1 Western Terrace, Falmouth; Cornwall, TR11 4QJ, United Kingdom
- Coordinates: 50.148933566640515°N 5.07502079010007°W
- Construction started: 2012
- Owner: Nick Rudlin; Sioned Parry-Redlin

Other information
- Number of rooms: 39

Website
- www.merchantsmanor.com

Merchants Manor Hotel is a hotel set on a hill above the town of Falmouth in Cornwall. Originally a mansion built in 1913 for the Carne family of merchants and brewers who developed the screw–cap bottle, in 1958, it became known as the Green Lawns Hotel. It became the Merchants Manor Hotel in 2012.
