= Merchants Hotel (St. Paul) =

Former hotel in Minnesota, US

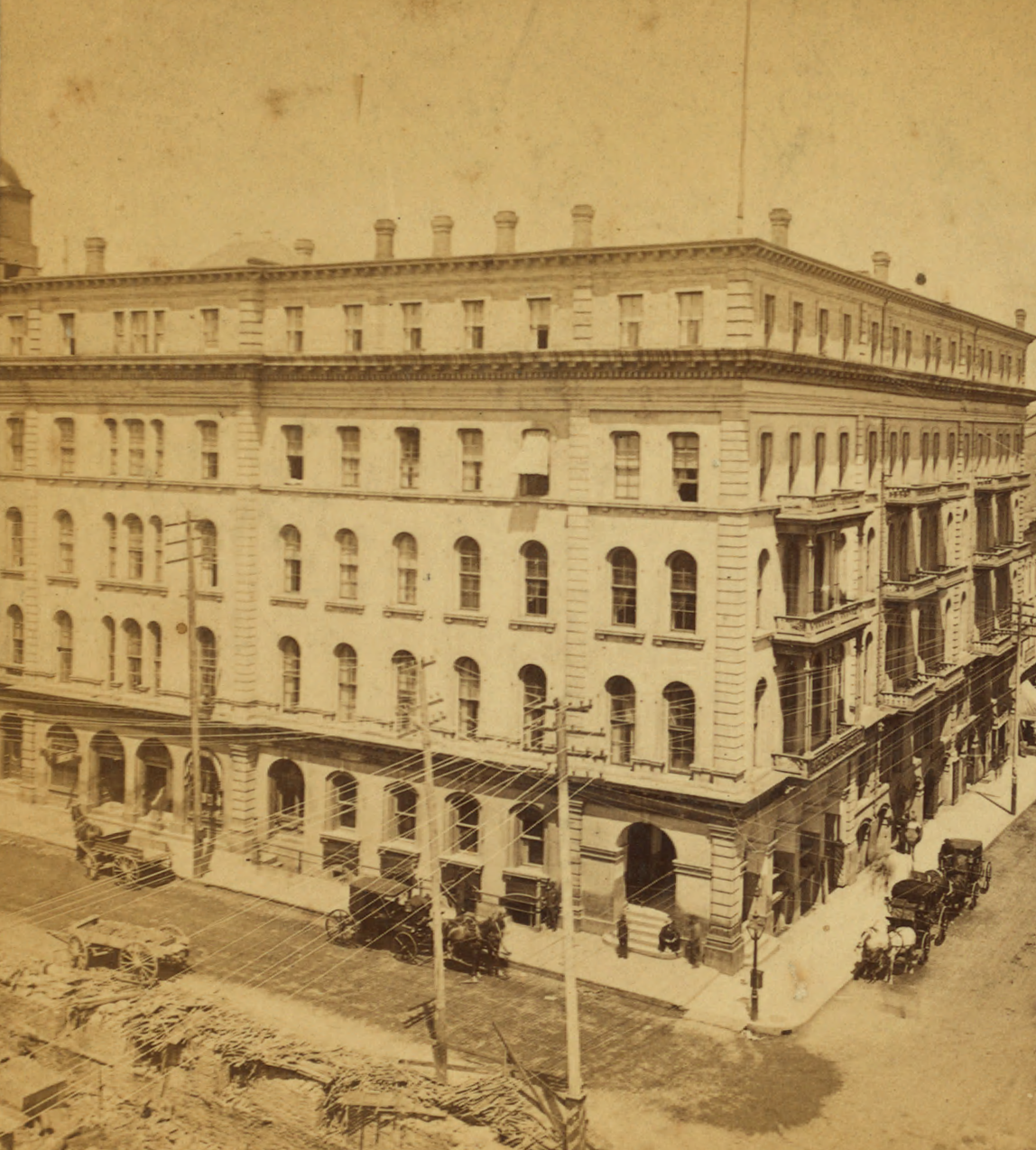
Merchants Hotel by Truman Ward Ingersoll

Merchants Hotel is a former hotel in St. Paul, Minnesota. It was built on the site of the St. Paul House, St. Paul's first hotel, and was upgraded and expanded over many years to become a stone building. It was demolished in 1923 after newer hotels drew away customers.

Sitting Bull was exhibited at the hotel by the hotel's owner Alvaren Allen.

The building was Italianate in design. It was four stories with a fifth eventually added on.

The hotel was located at 159 East Third Street, now renamed Kellogg Boulevard.
