= Sharon Sayles Belton =

American community leader, politician and activist

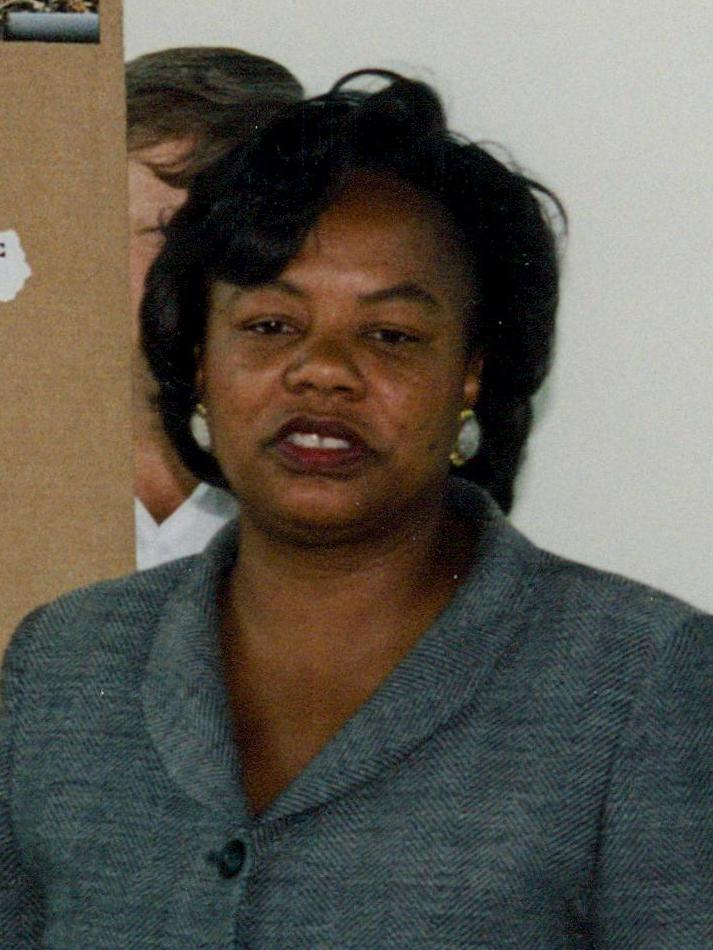
- Sharon Sayles Belton as Mayor of Minneapolis, 1990s

45th Mayor of Minneapolis
- In office January 1, 1994 – December 31, 2001
- Preceded by: Donald M. Fraser
- Succeeded by: R. T. Rybak

President of the Minneapolis City Council
- In office 1990–1993

Member of the Minneapolis City Council from the 8th Ward
- In office 1983–1993

Personal details
- Born: Sharon Sayles; May 13, 1951 (age 75) Saint Paul, Minnesota, U.S.
- Party: Democratic (DFL)
- Children: 3
- Education: Macalester College

Sharon Sayles Belton (born May 13, 1951) is an American community leader, politician and activist. She is Vice President of Community Relations and Government Affairs for Thomson Reuters Legal.

She served as mayor of Minneapolis, Minnesota, from 1994 until 2001, and was the first African American and first woman to hold that position.

== Early life and education ==
Sayles Belton was born in Saint Paul, Minnesota, one of four daughters of Bill and Ethel Sayles. After her parents separated, she lived for one year with her mother in Richfield, Minnesota, where she was the only African American in East Junior High School. She then moved to south Minneapolis to live with her father and stepmother. She attended Central High School in Minneapolis. She volunteered as a candy striper at Mount Sinai Hospital, and later worked as a nurse's aide. She was briefly a civil rights activist in the state of Mississippi.

Sayles Belton attended Macalester College in Saint Paul, where she studied biology and sociology. She later worked as a parole officer with victims of sexual assault. Like her grandfather Bill Sayles, she became a neighborhood activist.

== Career ==
In 1983, Sayles Belton was elected by the Eighth Ward to the Minneapolis City Council. She was inspired by working with mayor Donald M. Fraser. She represented the state at the 1984 Democratic National Convention, where Minnesota politician Walter Mondale was nominated for President of the United States. A member of the Minnesota Democratic-Farmer-Labor Party, Sayles Belton was elected city council president in 1990.

In 1993, she announced her candidacy for mayor. With the help of three phone banks and a staff of ten, she was elected on a platform that included reform of the police department, and focused on her election as the first African American and the first woman mayor in the city's 140-year history. She defeated DFL former Hennepin County Commissioner John Derus. She was reelected in 1997, defeating Republican candidate Barbara Carlson. Sayles Belton held the position for two terms, from January 1, 1994, to December 31, 2001.

During her tenure, the city addressed archaic utilities billing, outdated water treatment and neighborhood flooding. By the end of the decade, Minneapolis saw increased property values, its first increase in population since the 1940s, and a reversal of a "50-year economic slide." Sayles Belton is credited with stabilizing neighborhoods amid racial tensions, supporting the school system, and being an able and savvy city manager. Critics of Sayles Belton opposed the use of city subsidies for downtown development, said to total $90 million combined for the Target store and Block E.

In the 2001, election Sayles Belton lost her party's endorsement and the Democratic primary to R. T. Rybak, who received the support of the powerful Minneapolis Police Federation. After leaving the mayor's office, Sayles Belton became a senior fellow at the Roy Wilkins Center for Human Relations and Social Justice. The center is part of the Hubert H. Humphrey Institute of Public Affairs.

Sayles Belton worked in community affairs and community involvement for the GMAC Residential Finance Corporation, headquartered in Minneapolis. In 2010, she joined Thomson Reuters as vice president of Community Relations and Government Affairs, based in Eagan, Minnesota.

== Personal life ==
She is married to Steven Belton, with whom she raised three children: Kilayna, Jordan, and Coleman.

== Associations ==
Sayles Belton is involved in initiatives supporting racial equity, community and neighborhood development, public policy, women's rights, family and children's issues, police-community relations and youth development. In 1978 she co-founded the Harriet Tubman Shelter for Battered Women in Minneapolis. She is a co-founder of the National Coalition Against Sexual Assault. She contributed to the Neighborhood Revitalization Program, Clean Water Partnership, Children's Healthcare and Hospital, the American Bar Association, the Bush Foundation, the United States Conference of Mayors, the National League of Cities, and Hennepin County Medical Center by chairing or serving on their boards.

== Awards and recognition ==
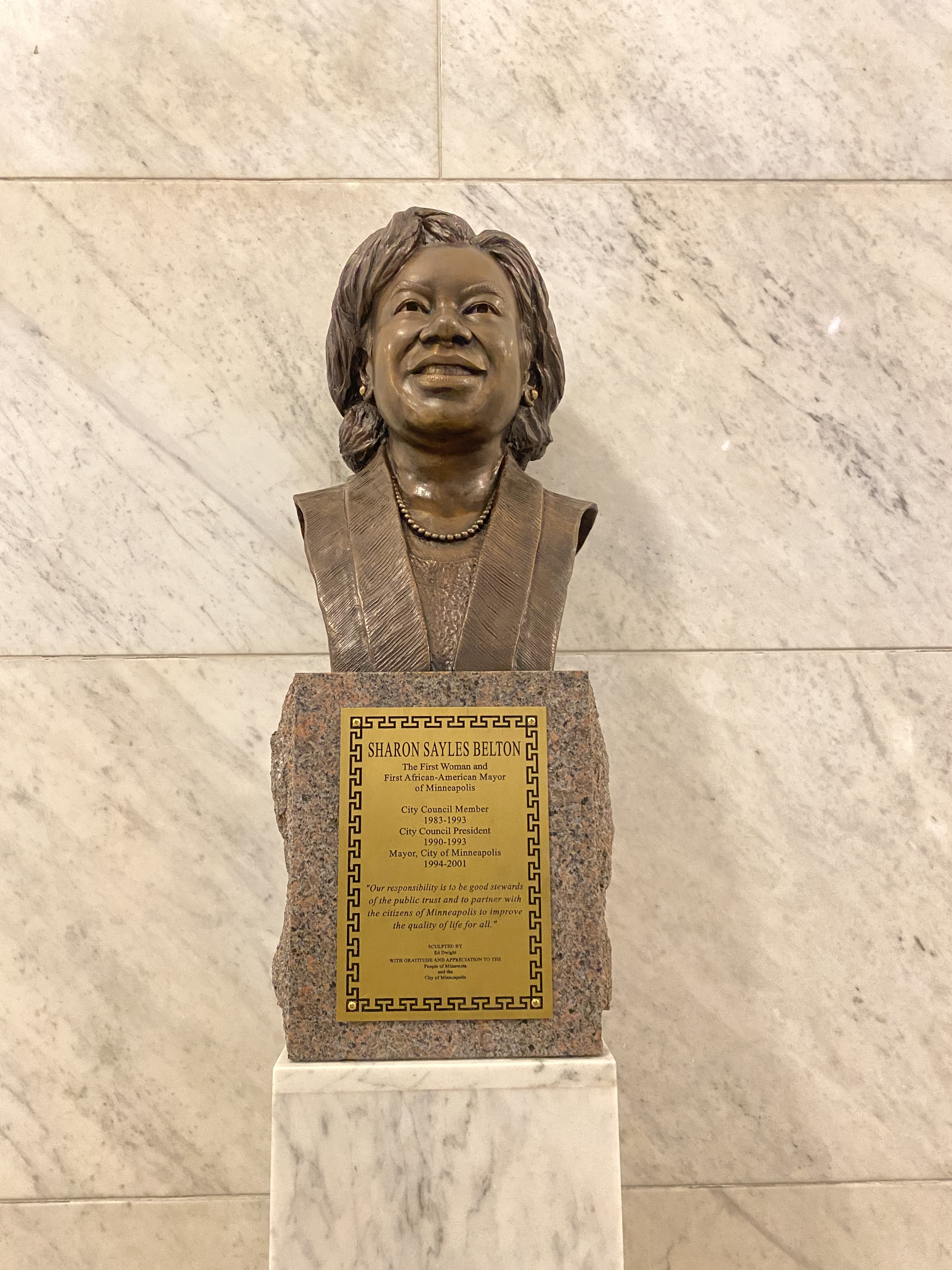
Bust of Sayles Belton in Minneapolis City Hall, pictured in 2023

- Gertrude E. Rush Distinguished Service Award presented by the National Bar Association
- Rosa Parks Award, presented by the American Association for Affirmative Action
- A bust of Sayles Belton was unveiled in Minneapolis City Hall on May 16, 2017, which was declared Sharon Sayles Belton day in Minnesota by Governor Mark Dayton.

== Notes ==
Political offices
Preceded by Donald M. Fraser	Mayor of Minneapolis; 1994 – 2001	Succeeded by R.T. Rybak
