= David A. Secombe =

American politician (1827–1892)

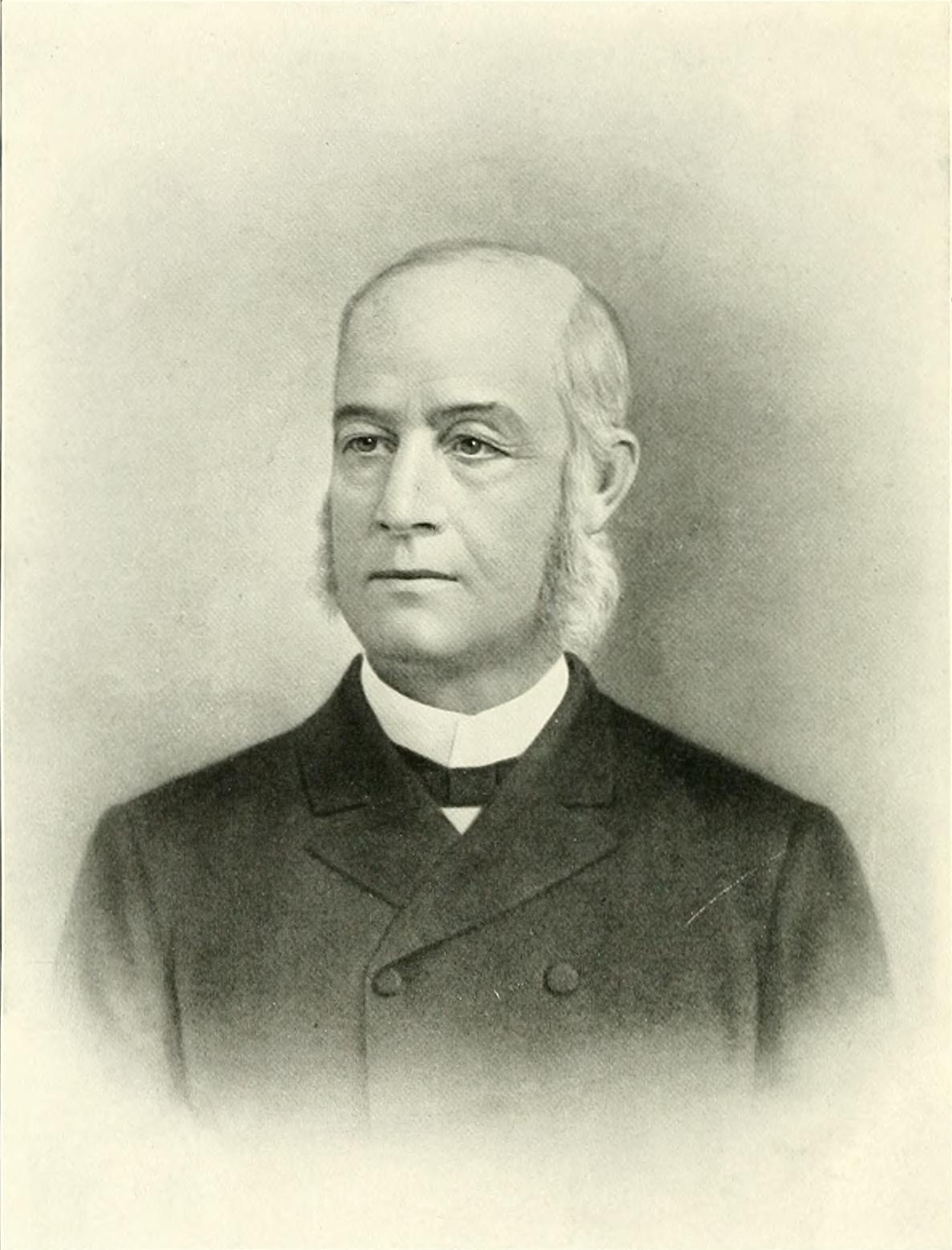

Mayor of St. Anthony, Minnesota
- In office August 23, 1856 – April 7, 1857
- Preceded by: Alvaren Allen
- Succeeded by: William W. Wales

Personal details
- Born: David Adam Secombe; May 25, 1827 Milford, New Hampshire, U.S.
- Died: March 25, 1892 (aged 64) Minneapolis, Minnesota, U.S.
- Resting place: Lakewood Cemetery
- Spouse: Charlotte A. Eaton (m. 1855)
- Children: 3

David Adam Secombe (May 25, 1827 – March 25, 1892) was a lawyer and Republican politician in Minnesota. He served as mayor of St. Anthony, as a delegate at the state's constitutional convention and in the Minnesota House of Representatives.

== Early life and career ==
David Adam Secombe was born on May 25, 1827, in Milford, New Hampshire. He attended local schools and attended Hancock and Pembrooke academies. He entered Dartmouth College in 1847, but left before graduating to study law under Daniel Clark. In June 1851, he relocated to Minnesota and settled in St. Anthony; he was admitted to the bar in July 1852. He briefly worked in partnership with John W. North but later left to pursue an independent practice. Secombe remained an active lawyer in Hennepin County for the next four decades.

== Career ==
He was briefly active in Republican politics. In 1856 he was elected as an alderman in St. Anthony. When Alvaren Allen resigned as mayor, Secombe served out the remainder of his term. He attended Minnesota's Republican Constitutional Convention in 1858 and served one term in the Minnesota House of Representatives from 1859 to 1861. He was a delegate at the 1860 Republican National Convention. After serving briefly as Hennepin County Attorney from 1871 to 1872, he withdrew from politics to focus on his law practice.

== Personal life ==
Secombe married Mrs. Charlotte A. Eaton, daughter of William K. Eastman, of Conway, New Hampshire, on February 27, 1855. He had a daughter and two sons, Mrs. E. C. Chatfield, William and Frank.

Secombe died at his home on Oak Grove Street in Minneapolis on March 18, 1892. He was buried in Lakewood Cemetery.
