= Donald M. Fraser =

American politician (1924–2019)

Don Fraser
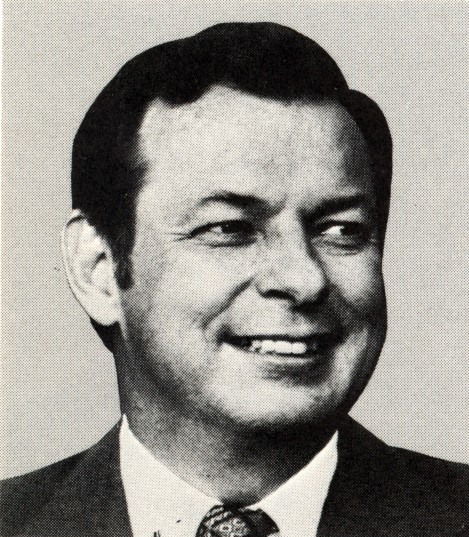
- Official portrait, 1977

44th Mayor of Minneapolis
- In office January 2, 1980 – January 3, 1994
- Preceded by: Albert Hofstede
- Succeeded by: Sharon Sayles Belton

67th President of the National League of Cities
- In office 1993
- Preceded by: Glenda Hood
- Succeeded by: Sharpe James

Member of the U.S. House of Representatives from Minnesota's 5th district
- In office January 3, 1963 – January 3, 1979
- Preceded by: Walter Judd
- Succeeded by: Martin Olav Sabo

Member of the Minnesota Senate
- In office 1955–1963

Personal details
- Born: Donald MacKay Fraser; February 20, 1924 Minneapolis, Minnesota, U.S.
- Died: June 2, 2019 (aged 95) Minneapolis, Minnesota, U.S.
- Party: Democratic (DFL)
- Spouse: Arvonne Skelton (m. 1950; died 2018)
- Children: 6
- Education: University of Minnesota (BA, LLB)

Donald MacKay Fraser (February 20, 1924 – June 2, 2019) was an American politician from Minnesota who served as U.S. Representative from Minnesota's 5th congressional district from 1963 to 1979 and as mayor of Minneapolis from 1980 to 1994.

== Early life ==
Fraser was born in Minneapolis, Minnesota, to Everett and Lois (McKay) Fraser, immigrants from Canada. His father studied law at Harvard University, began teaching at George Washington University and became dean of the University of Minnesota Law School in 1920. Fraser graduated from University High School in 1941 and enrolled at the University of Minnesota that same year. During his college years, he was a member of the varsity swimming team.

Having joined the university's NROTC program, he was placed on active duty in July 1942 and continued his naval studies on campus until February 1944, when he was commissioned an officer after graduating with a bachelor's degree and was sent to the Pacific Theater during World War II. Fraser served as a radar officer into the peacetime that followed, ending in 1946. In June 1946, Fraser returned to Minneapolis to study law at the University of Minnesota Law School.

Fraser served as a member of the Minnesota Law Review and wrote a law review article on the illegality of racial covenants for land. This viewpoint was later upheld by the Supreme Court in its 1948 decision, Shelley v. Kraemer. That same year, Fraser earned his law degree and was admitted to the bar. He joined the politically active firm of Larson, Loevinger, Lindquist, Freeman, and Fraser, where he engaged in general law practice and served as the municipal attorney for Brooklyn Center, Minnesota, a suburban community. He married Arvonne Skelton in 1950 and the following year, they had the first of their six children: Thomas, Mary, John, Lois, Anne, and Jean.

== Political career ==
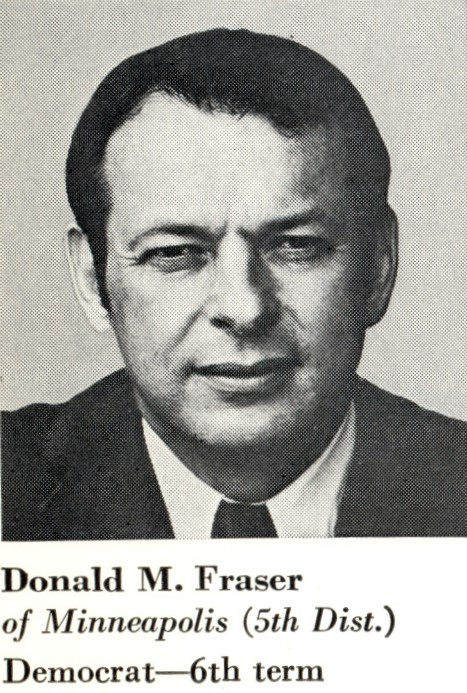
1973, Congressional Pictorial Directory

In 1954, Fraser was elected to the Minnesota Senate and served for eight years. In 1962, he was elected to the U.S. House of Representatives from Minnesota's Fifth District. He served there in the 88th through the 95th Congresses, from January 3, 1963 until January 3, 1979. Fraser is now best known for his work as the chair of the International Organizations and Movements subcommittee, a post he used to hold hearings on human rights violations in U.S. allies. As the historian Barbara Keys has shown, from 1973 to 1976, Fraser was a key leader in Congress in drafting legislation to reduce U.S. aid to countries whose governments engaged in a pattern of "gross violations of human rights." His efforts laid the foundations for much of Jimmy Carter's human rights agenda and transformed the way the U.S. Department of State operates, mandating that it write annual country reports on human rights and ensuring that diplomatic posts take note of human rights issues. In 1978, following the death of incumbent U.S. senator Hubert Humphrey, Fraser chose to run in the special election for Humphrey's old senate seat instead of running for re-election to the house. Fraser received the endorsement of the DFL but was narrowly defeated by the more conservative businessman Bob Short. Short went on to lose the general election to attorney David Durenberger.

Fraser served as president of Americans for Democratic Action from 1974 to 1976. He was elected mayor of Minneapolis in 1979, taking office on January 2, 1980. His first mayoral term was two years; he was re-elected to three four-year terms. He was the oldest, longest-lived and longest-serving mayor in Minneapolis history. In 1993, he served as president of the National League of Cities. He left office as mayor on January 3, 1994, and was succeeded by the city's first female and first African-American mayor, Sharon Sayles Belton.

Fraser died on June 2, 2019, at age 95.

== Papers ==
His papers are available for research. The collection is particularly strong in its documentation of international relations, Democratic Party policy and reform, human rights issues, environmental conservation, and women's issues, in the 1960s and 1970s.

== Endorsement of United Nations Parliamentary Assembly (UNPA) ==
On April 23, 2014, Fraser endorsed the proposal for the United Nations Parliamentary Assembly. He is one of only six people who served in Congress to do so.

== See also ==
- McGovern–Fraser Commission

U.S. House of Representatives
Preceded by Walter Judd	Member of the U.S. House of Representatives from Minnesota's 5th congressional district 1963–1979	Succeeded by Martin Olav Sabo
Party political offices
Vacant Title last held by Howard Baker, George H. W. Bush, Peter Dominick, Gerald Ford, Robert Griffin, Thomas Kuchel, Mel Laird, Bob Mathias, George Murphy, Dick Poff, Chuck Percy, Al Quie, Charlotte Reid, Hugh Scott, Bill Steiger, John Tower; 1968	Response to the State of the Union address 1970; Served alongside: Scoop Jackson, Mike Mansfield, John McCormack, Ed Muskie, Bill Proxmire, Patsy Mink	Succeeded by Mike Mansfield
Political offices
Preceded by Albert Hofstede	Mayor of Minneapolis; 1980–1994	Succeeded by Sharon Sayles Belton
