= R. T. Rybak =

Mayor of Minneapolis (2002-2014)

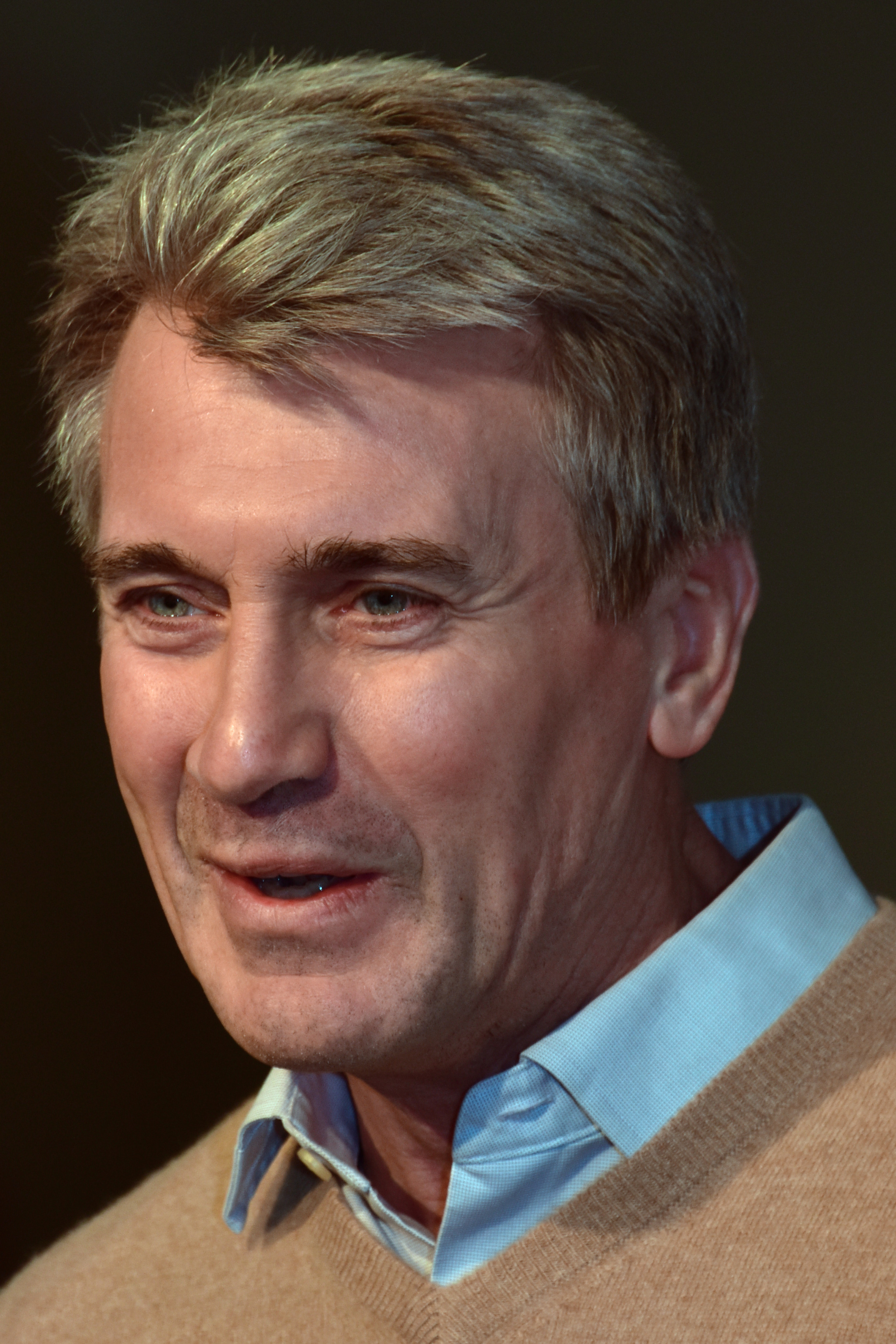
- Rybak in 2018

46th Mayor of Minneapolis
- In office January 1, 2002 – January 2, 2014
- Preceded by: Sharon Sayles Belton
- Succeeded by: Betsy Hodges

Personal details
- Born: Raymond Thomas Rybak Jr. November 12, 1955 (age 71)
- Party: Democratic
- Education: Boston College (BA)

Raymond Thomas Rybak Jr. (born November 12, 1955) is an American politician, journalist, businessman, and activist who served from 2002 to 2014 as the 46th mayor of Minneapolis. In 2001, Rybak defeated incumbent mayor Sharon Sayles Belton by a margin of 65% to 35%, the widest margin of victory over an incumbent mayor in city history. He took office in January 2002, and was reelected in 2005 and 2009. In December 2012, he announced that he would not run for another term and would concentrate on his family. Rybak called being mayor his "dream job".

Before being elected mayor, Rybak worked in journalism, business and activism. The first mayor of a major U.S. city to endorse Barack Obama's 2008 campaign for president, Rybak was one of five vice chairs of the Democratic National Committee.

== Background ==
Rybak grew up in Minneapolis, the son of Lorraine Ann (née Palmer) and Raymond Thomas Rybak, a pharmacist. He is partly of Czech descent. He graduated from Breck School in 1974 and from Boston College in 1978.

After returning to Minneapolis, in the 1970s and '80s Rybak worked as a journalist for the Minneapolis Tribune. He became managing editor of the Twin Cities Reader, where he also launched Q Monthly, a local gay and lesbian newspaper. For a few years, he headed Internet Broadcasting Systems, which started as an online division of Minneapolis television station WCCO and runs websites for many stations across the country. Rybak did consulting work as an Internet strategist and assisted with some projects with Minnesota Public Radio and Public Radio International.

He also acted as Development Director for Minneapolis's Downtown Council. During this time, Rybak worked as a community and political activist. In 1994, he was campaign manager for Tony Bouza, the former Minneapolis chief of police who unsuccessfully sought the DFL nomination for governor of Minnesota. Rybak was an early member of the group ROAR ("Residents Opposed to Airport Racket"), which campaigned for noise mitigation projects in neighborhoods around the Minneapolis–Saint Paul International Airport. The group staged a memorable "pajama protest" in which area residents wore their nighttime clothes at the airport to show that they were losing sleep because of airplane noise.

Rybak serves on the board of directors of Nice Ride Minnesota, a public bicycle-sharing program.

== Mayor of Minneapolis (2002-2014) ==
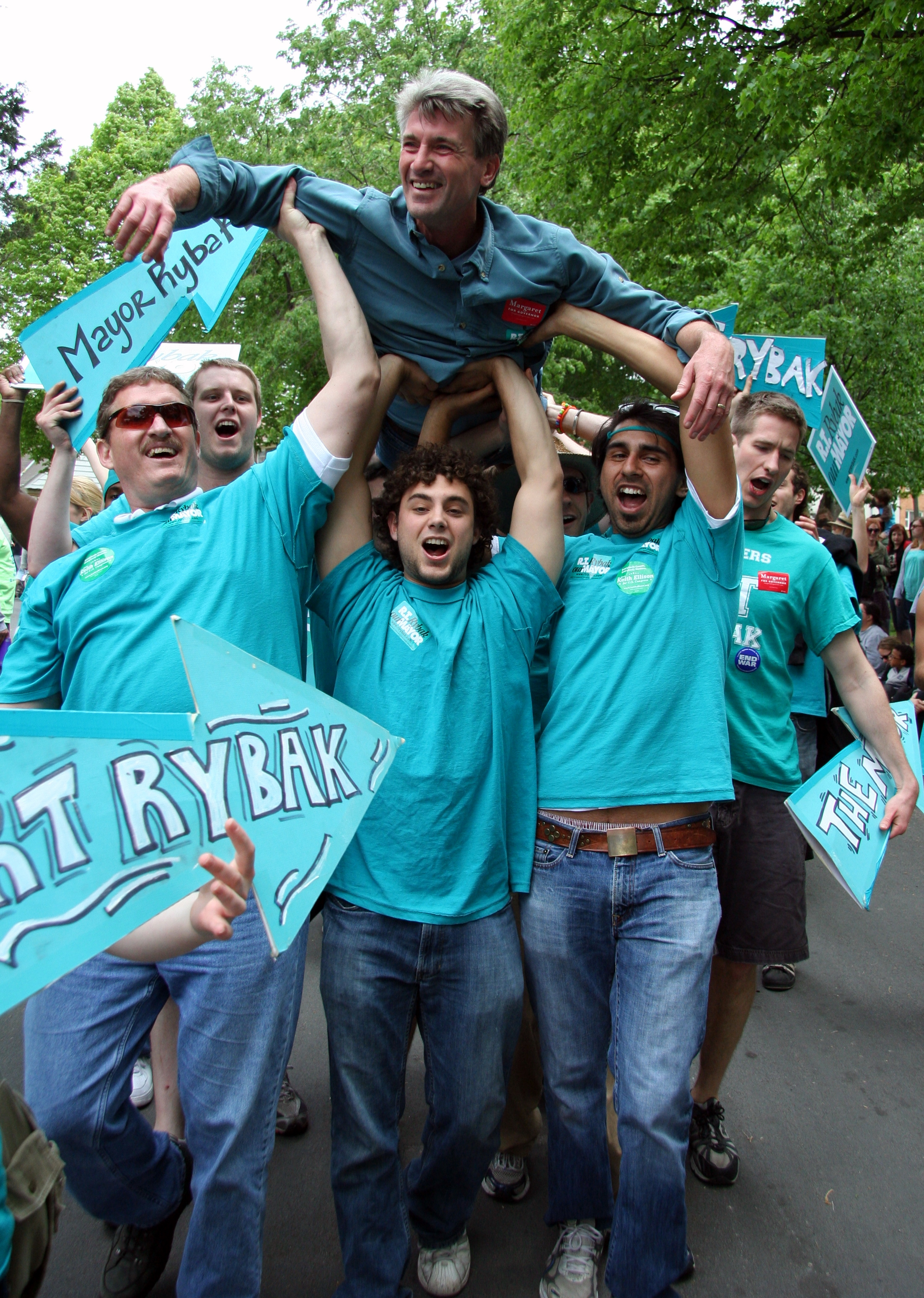
Rybak crowd surfing in a Minneapolis parade

In 2001, Rybak defeated incumbent mayor Sharon Sayles Belton, receiving 57,739 votes (64.7%) to her 30,896 (34.6%).

Rybak's mayoralty focused mostly on reducing crime, creating jobs, building affordable housing, and balancing the city budget. He regularly attended public events and participated directly in discussions of city issues on his Facebook page. He notably crowd-surfed while mayor, diving from the stage during a "Rock for Democracy" event at the Minneapolis club First Avenue in July 2004.

In 2002, Rybak developed the City of Lakes Loppet, a 35-kilometer urban cross-country ski race through Theodore Wirth Park and across Cedar Lake, Lake of the Isles, and Bde Maka Ska, which ends on the streets of the Uptown Minneapolis. The event attracts nearly 2,000 skiers. Rybak is a skier and has participated in races.

Rybak made many public appearances at rallies and protests. In 2004, he spoke to a rally of striking Metro Transit workers at the Hennepin County Government Center plaza. Like many Twin Cities politicians, he marched in the annual Twin Cities Pride Parade.

In his 2005 reelection campaign Rybak defeated challenger (and fellow DFLer) Peter McLaughlin by nearly 25 percentage points, 61.5% to 36.7%. He celebrated with another crowd-surf.

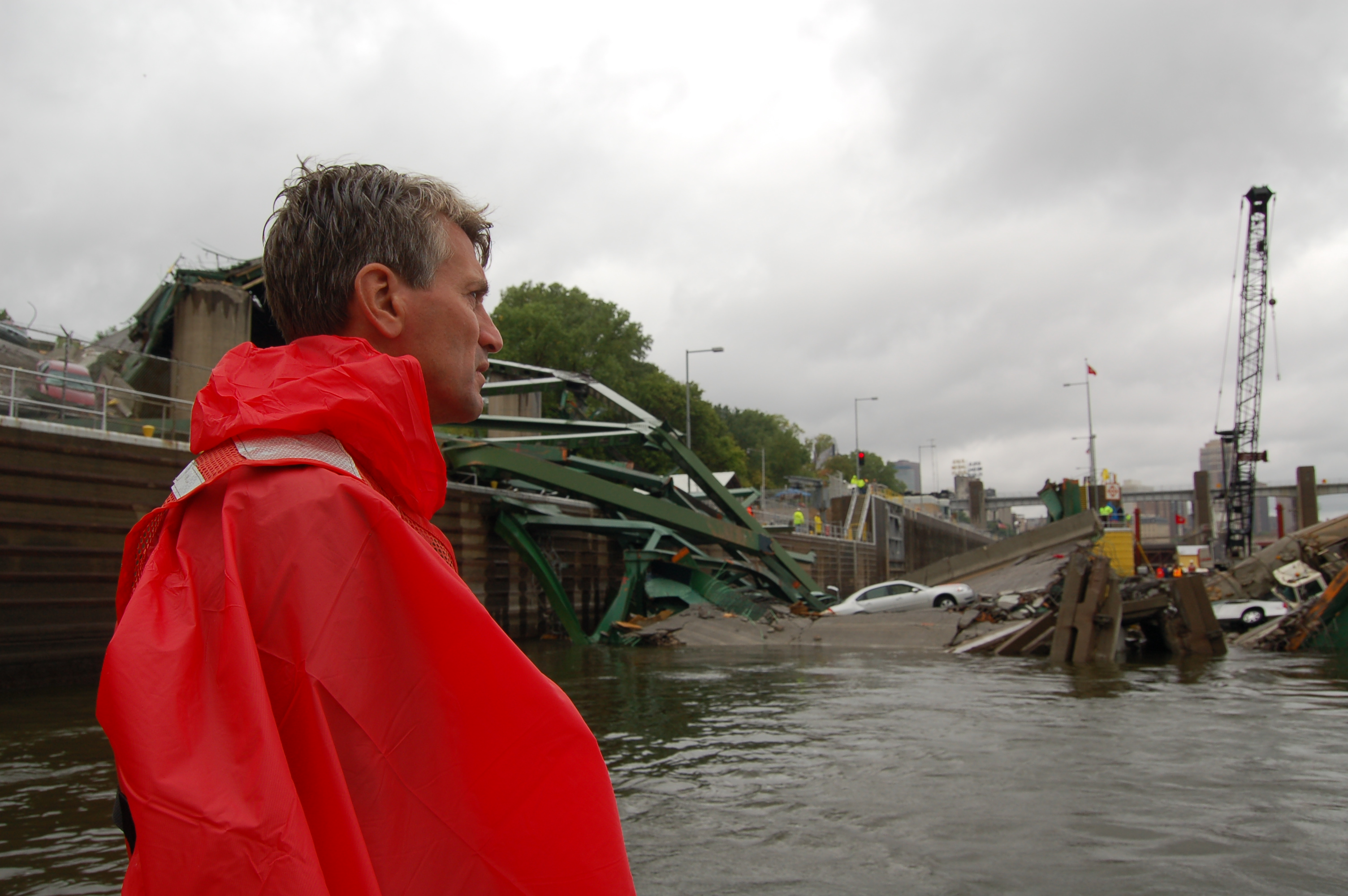
Rybak at the site of the bridge collapse

In August 2007, after the collapse of the I-35W Mississippi River bridge, Rybak asked Governor Tim Pawlenty and Minnesota state officials to implement its replacement, ensuring that the new bridge would be capable of handling mass transit. Rybak pushed to ensure that future needs and policy considerations would not be ignored in the rush to build a replacement. The resulting plan accommodated a light rail line. Rybak said, "we [the city] have a vision that we believe will be for a bridge that will serve us for many years to come." His role also involved authorizing municipal consent of the final bridge replacement.

Rybak was listed as a finalist for the 2008 World Mayor award. In June 2008, he was elected Vice President for Communications of the National Conference of Democratic Mayors.

According to DNC Chair Debbie Wasserman Schultz, Rybak was the first mayor of a large U.S. city to endorse Barack Obama's presidential campaign in 2007. He campaigned for Obama and was active in the campaign's youth wing.

In January 2009, Rybak announced his intention to run for reelection to a third term.

In March 2009, Rybak proposed eliminating the Minneapolis Civil Rights Investigations Division, which was established in 1967 to investigate discriminatory practices as part of the city's Civil Rights Department. The plan was met by community opposition, with both the DFL African American Caucus and the Minneapolis Urban League speaking out against it. During his mayoralty, Rybak went through six civil rights directors and decreased the number of workers in the department.

On November 3, 2009, Rybak was elected to a third term, winning more than 73.6% of the first-place votes.

Rybak's office regularly used social media including Twitter to alert followers to vital city information.

Rybak chose not to run for a fourth term. His mayoralty ended on January 2, 2014, when Betsy Hodges was sworn in as the city's 47th mayor. After leaving office, Rybak became executive director of Generation Next, an organization seeking to help close the achievement gap for minority students. He is now president and CEO of the Minneapolis Foundation.

== 2010 gubernatorial campaign ==
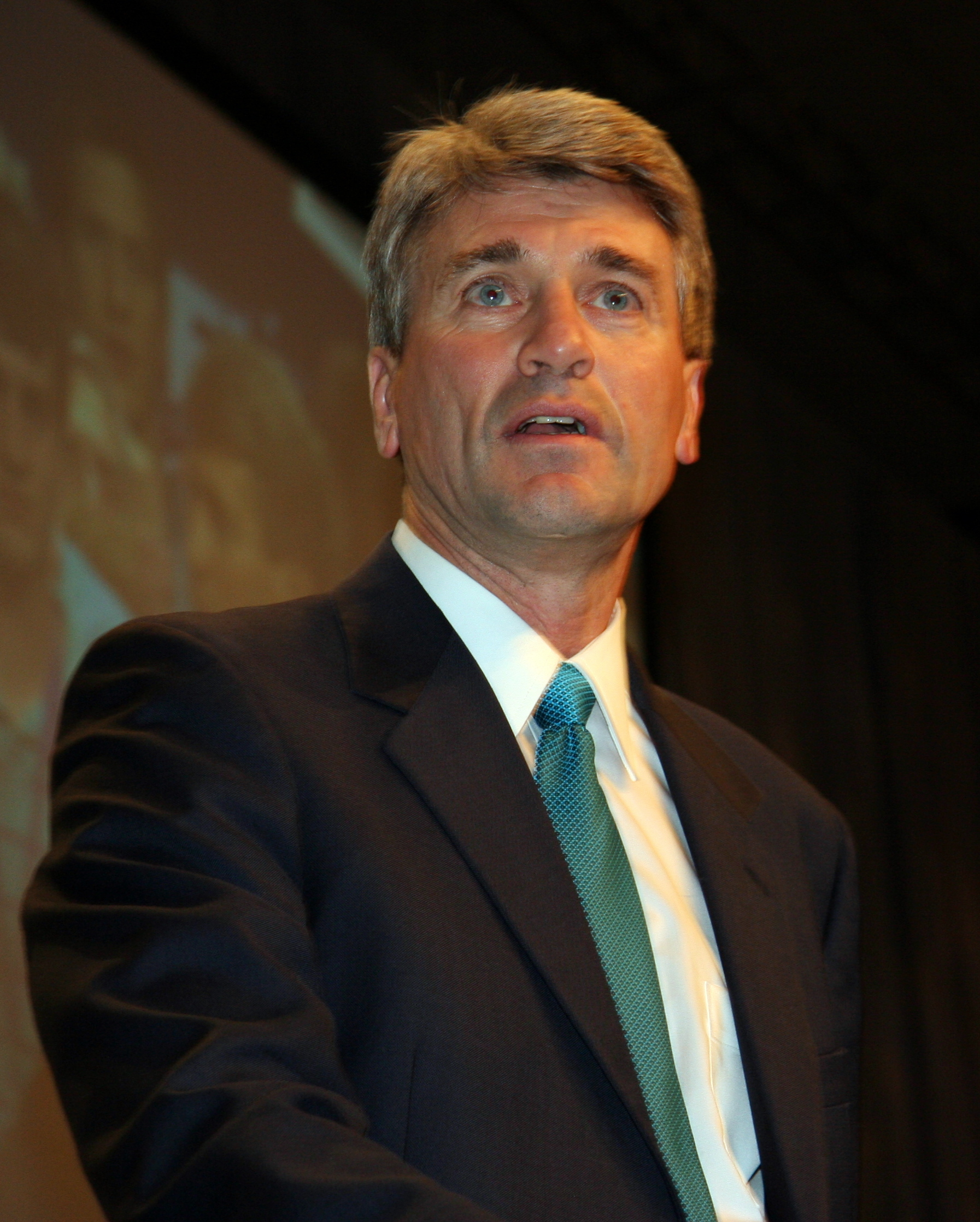
Rybak ending his campaign for governor of Minnesota

On November 5, 2009, Rybak filed paperwork creating a campaign for governor of Minnesota. A month later, he officially announced his candidacy at the Varsity Theater in Minneapolis. Rybak won the straw poll on February 2, 2010, at Minnesota's precinct caucus events statewide.

At the DFL convention on April 24, 2010, Rybak withdrew his name from consideration for the nomination after six ballots. He endorsed Margaret Anderson Kelliher, and called on Democrats remaining in the race to withdraw and support her. Former U.S. Senator Mark Dayton subsequently won the nomination and the general election.

== Other work ==
Living Cities, a philanthropic collaborative of 22 foundations and financial institutions, reported that Rybak was hired in May 2014 as a senior advisor for municipal practice. Living Cities members include Bank of America, J.P. Morgan, Wells Fargo and Morgan Stanley.

In September 2011, Rybak became vice chairman of the Democratic National Committee.

== Personal life ==
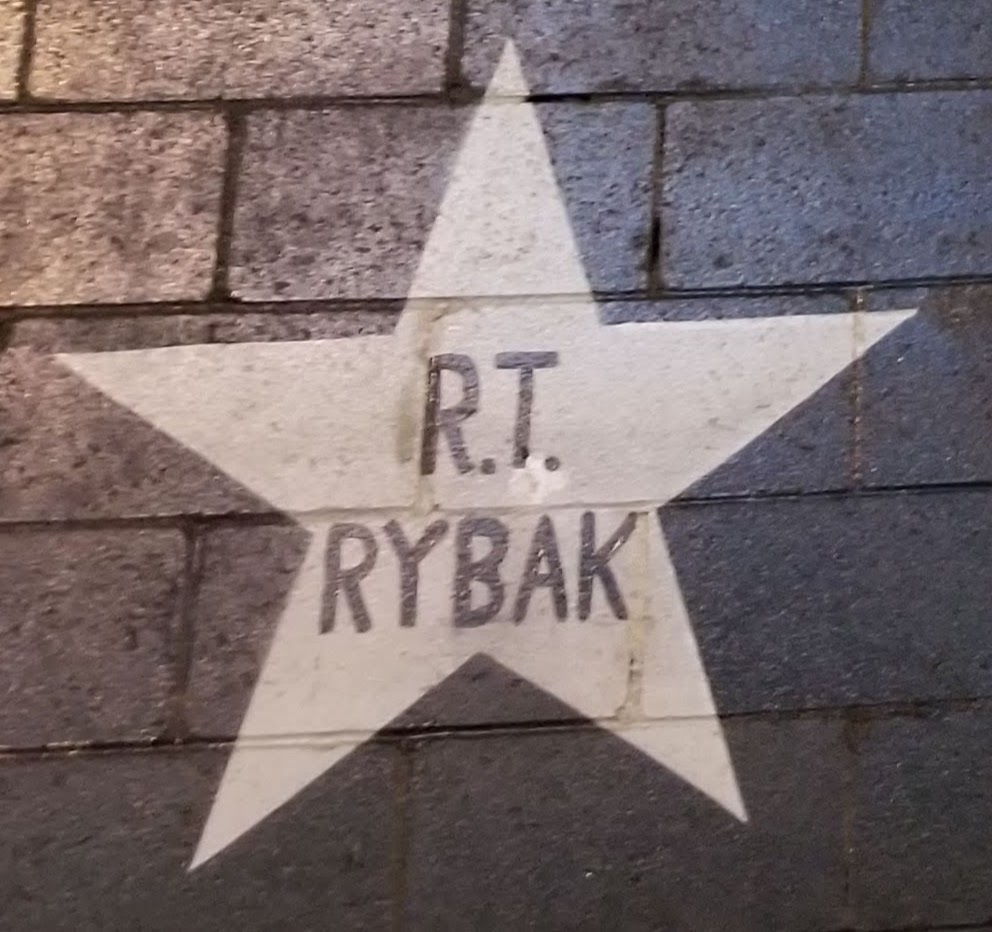
Rybak's star on the outside mural of Minneapolis nightclub First Avenue

Rybak lives in the city's East Harriet neighborhood with his wife, Megan, and their children, Charlie and Grace. Like their father, the Rybak children have attended Breck School, an Episcopal private school. Rybak's mother worked there during a difficult period in his childhood. Rybak was awarded Breck's Distinguished Alumnus award in 2002, and spoke at the school's commencement ceremony in 2015.

On January 4, 2014, Rybak was cross-country skiing when he started experiencing chest pains and shortness of breath. He was hospitalized and received an angioplasty and stents after it was determined he had had a heart attack. Heart problems run in his family.

Rybak has been honored with a star on the outside mural of the Minneapolis nightclub First Avenue. The mural recognizes performers who have played sold-out shows or otherwise demonstrated a major contribution to the culture at the venue. Receiving a star "might be the most prestigious public honor an artist can receive in Minneapolis", according to journalist Steve Marsh. Rybak is one of the few non-musicians to have a star on the mural.

Political offices
Preceded by Sharon Sayles Belton	Mayor of Minneapolis; 2002–2014	Succeeded by Betsy Hodges
