= Allys Dwyer =

American actress (1903–1998)

Allys Dwyer (August 10, 1903 – October 15, 1998) was an American actress who became a college educator.

== Early years ==
Dwyer was the daughter of Mr. and Mrs. Thomas Augustin Dwyer of New York. Her father was vice-president of the Brunswick-Balke-Collender Company. She graduated cum laude with a bachelor of arts degree from the College of New Rochelle. She also acted in a student production while she was there.

== Career ==
=== Acting ===
Dwyer debuted as a professional actress in the play The Fool, performing with a touring company, after which she joined the Henry Jewett Players in Boston. In 1925, she performed with the Dowling and Anhalt troupe. In 1926, she acted with the Fulton Players in Lancaster, Pennsylvania. In August 1929, she became the leading actress with the Bainbridge Players at the Shubert Theater in Minneapolis. Her work there included portraying Nina in a production of Eugene O'Neill's Strange Interlude. Her tenure with the Bainbridge Players ended in December 1929, when she left to work in motion pictures under a contract with Fox Film Corporation.

On Broadway, Dwyer appeared in The Five O'Clock Girl (1927), A Regular Guy (1931), and Hot Money (1931).

=== Academics ===
By 1936, Dwyer (going by her married name, Allys Dwyer Vergara) had become a lecturer in speech at the College of New Rochelle. By 1939, she had become an associate professor of speech. She also continued her own education at Columbia Teachers College, where in 1946 she wrote the dissertation A Critical Study of a Group of College Women's Responses to Poetry.

== Personal life ==
Dwyer was married to George Vergara, a former professional football player who later owned an insurance agency in New Rochelle, New York, and was mayor there from 1956 to 1960.

== Recognition ==
The College of New Rochelle established the Allys Dwyer Vergara Award to recognize students for excellence in speech.
