= Herold J. Weiler =

American lawyer

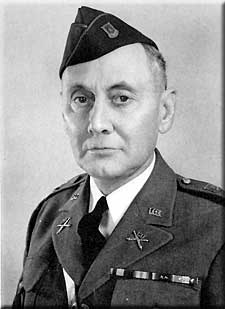
- Weiler as commander, 131st Field Artillery Regiment, 1940
- Born: April 12, 1886; Tioga, Illinois, U.S.
- Died: November 18, 1945 (aged 59); Refugio, Texas, U.S.
- Burial place: Oakwood Cemetery, Corsicana, Texas
- Military career
- Allegiance: United States
- Branch: United States Army
- Service years: 1907–1945
- Rank: Colonel
- Units: Texas Army National Guard; National Guard Bureau
- Commands: 2nd Battalion, 131st Field Artillery Regiment; 131st Field Artillery Regiment; Chief of the National Guard Bureau
- Conflicts: Pancho Villa Expedition; World War I World War II
- Other work: Factory owner Oil field manager

Herold J. Weiler (April 12, 1886 – November 18, 1945) was a United States Army officer who served as acting Chief of the National Guard Bureau.

== Early life ==
Herold James Weiler was born in Tioga, Illinois on April 12, 1886. He was raised and educated in Corsicana, Texas, and enlisted in the Texas National Guard's, Troop D, 1st Cavalry Squadron in 1907.

Weiler rose through the ranks and was a First Sergeant when he was commissioned as a First Lieutenant in 1912.

In his civilian career Weiler was the owner and operator of Weiler Manufacturing, makers of heavy duty overalls, pants, and other outdoor wear for oil field and oil rig workers. In the 1920s he also worked in other management positions within the oil industry.

Weiler served on the Mexican border during the Pancho Villa Expedition in 1916 as a member of Troop D.

== World War I ==
During World War I Weiler served in France as a member of the 131st Field Artillery Regiment, a unit of the 36th Infantry Division.

== Post World War I ==
After World War I, Weiler continued his military service, including command of 2nd Battalion, 131st Field Artillery as a Major.

Weiler was a Lieutenant Colonel when he graduated from the United States Army Command and General Staff College in 1929.

== National Guard Bureau ==
In the early 1930s, Weiler was assigned to full-time National Guard duty with the Militia Bureau (now National Guard Bureau), serving as Chief of the Personnel Division.

Weiler was acting Chief of the Militia Bureau (now Chief of the National Guard Bureau) from December, 1935 to January, 1936.

== Return to Texas ==
In 1935, Weiler returned to Texas as commander of the 131st Field Artillery Regiment and U.S. Property and Disbursing Officer for Texas.

Weiler graduated from Washington College of Law in 1936 and passed the bar in Texas and Washington, D.C.

== World War II ==
During World War II Weiler served as procurement officer for the Texas Selective Service Department. He was approaching the mandatory retirement age of 60 and was on terminal leave at the time of his death.

== Death and burial ==
Weiler died in Refugio, Texas on November 18, 1945. He was killed in an accident while hunting, when a motorist drove through a field and crashed his car into Weiler's duck blind. Weiler was buried at Oakwood Cemetery in Corsicana.

== External resources ==
Military offices
Preceded by George E. Leach	Chief of the National Guard Bureau; 1935 –- 1936	Succeeded by John F. Williams (Acting)
