= Near v. Minnesota =

- Supreme Court of the United States

Argued January 30, 1930 Decided June 1, 1931
- Full case name: J. M. Near v. Minnesota, ex rel. Floyd B. Olson, County Attorney, Hennepin County, Minnesota
- Citations: 283 U.S. 697 (more) 51 S. Ct. 625; 75 L. Ed. 1357; 1931 U.S. LEXIS 175; 1 Media L. Rep. 1001

Case history
- Prior: Temporary injunction granted, 11-27-27; defendants' demurrer denied, State ex rel. Olson v. Guilford, Hennepin County District Court; affirmed, 219 N.W. 770 (Minn. 1928); judgment and injunction for plaintiffs, Hennepin County District Court; affirmed, 228 N.W. 326 (Minn. 1929)
- Subsequent: None

Holding
- A Minnesota law that imposed permanent injunctions against the publication of newspapers with "malicious, scandalous, and defamatory" content violated the First Amendment, as applied to the states by the Fourteenth.

Court membership
- Chief Justice Charles E. Hughes Associate Justices Oliver W. Holmes Jr. · Willis Van Devanter; James C. McReynolds · Louis Brandeis; George Sutherland · Pierce Butler; Harlan F. Stone · Owen Roberts

Case opinions
- Majority: Hughes, joined by Holmes, Brandeis, Stone, Roberts
- Dissent: Butler, joined by Van Devanter, McReynolds, Sutherland

Laws applied
- U.S. Const. amends. I, XIV; Minn. Stat. §§ 10123-1 to 10123-3 (1925)

Near v. Minnesota, 283 U.S. 697 (1931), is a landmark decision of the US Supreme Court under which prior restraint on publication was found to violate freedom of the press as protected under the First Amendment. This principle was applied to free speech generally in subsequent jurisprudence. The Court ruled that a Minnesota law that targeted publishers of "malicious" or "scandalous" newspapers violated the First Amendment to the United States Constitution (as applied through the Fourteenth Amendment). Legal scholar and columnist Anthony Lewis called Near the Court's "first great press case".

It was later a key precedent in New York Times Co. v. United States (1971), in which the Court ruled against the Nixon administration's attempt to enjoin publication of the Pentagon Papers.

== Background of the case ==
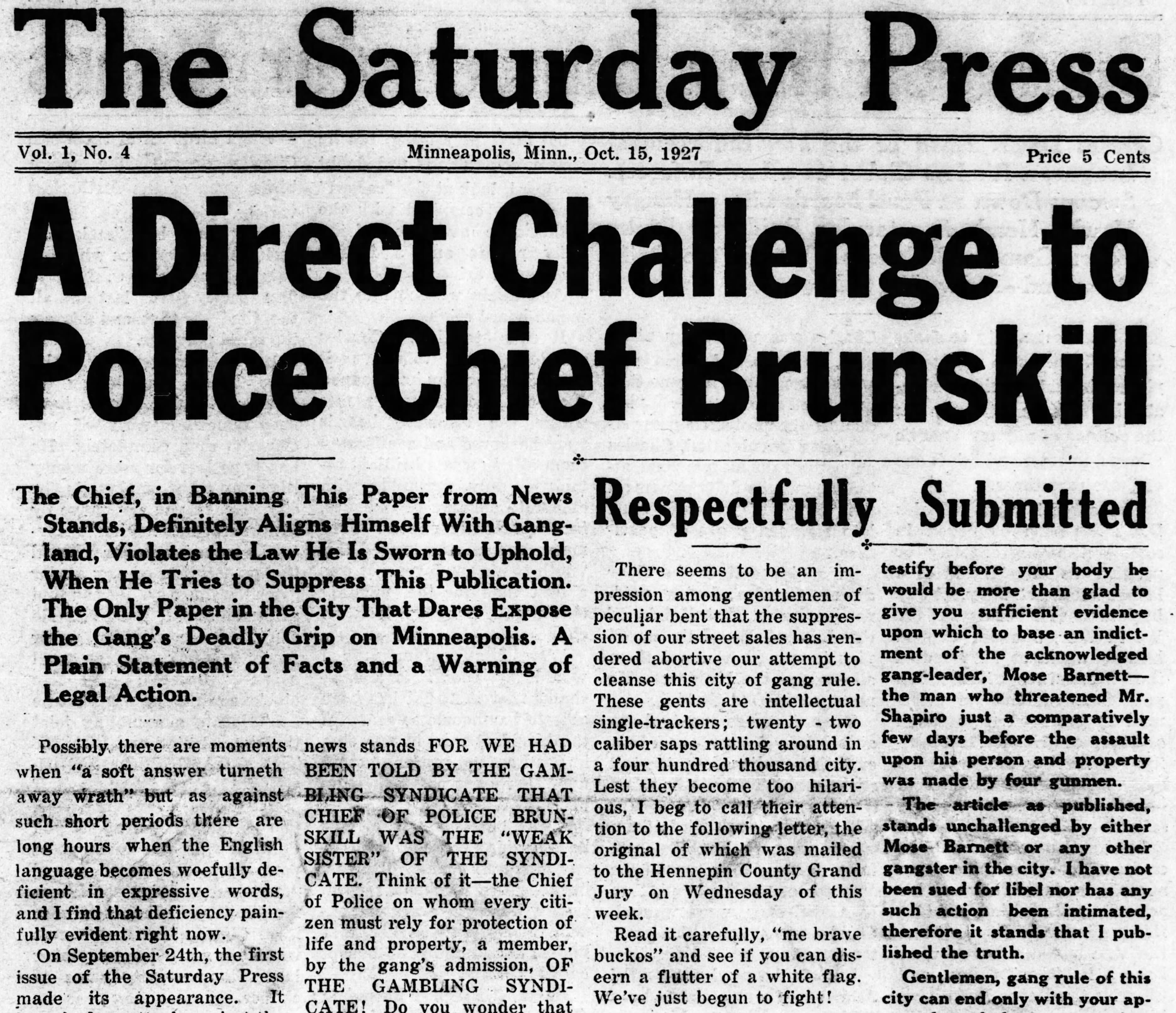
The October 15, 1927 edition of The Saturday Press

In 1927, Jay M. Near, who has been described as "anti-Catholic, anti-Semitic, anti-black, and anti-labor" began publishing The Saturday Press in Minneapolis with Howard A. Guilford, a former mayoral candidate who had been convicted of criminal libel.

The paper claimed that Jewish-American organized crime was "practically ruling" the city along with the police chief, Frank W. Brunskill, whom Near accused of corruption. Among the paper's other targets were mayor George E. Leach, Hennepin County attorney and future three-term governor Floyd B. Olson, and the members of the grand jury of Hennepin County, who, the paper claimed, were either incompetent or willfully failing to investigate and prosecute known criminal activity.

Shortly after the first issue was distributed, Guilford was shot and hospitalized, where a further attempt on his life was made. At least one of the stories printed in The Saturday Press led to a successful prosecution of a gangster called Big Mose Barnett who had tried to extort protection money from a local dry cleaner by destroying his customers' clothing.

=== First trial court proceeding ===
Olson filed a complaint against Near and Guilford under the Public Nuisance Law of 1925. Also known as the "Minnesota Gag Law", it provided permanent injunctions against those who created a "public nuisance," by publishing, selling, or distributing a "malicious, scandalous and defamatory newspaper." Olson claimed that the allegations raised against him and the other named public officials in all nine issues published between September 24, 1927, and November 19, 1927, as well as the paper's overall antisemitic tone, constituted a violation of this law. On November 22, 1927, Judge Matthias Baldwing of the Hennepin County District Court issued a temporary injunction that barred the defendants from editing, publishing, or circulating The Saturday Press or any other publication containing similar material. This injunction was granted without notice to either defendant on an ex parte hearing between Olson and the judge, and was to extend until the hearing on the judge's order for the defendants to show cause as to why they should not be permanently enjoined from publishing their paper. The hearing was held December 9, and future Minneapolis mayor Thomas E. Latimer argued that the defendants' activities were protected by the U.S. and Minnesota constitutions and demurred to the complaint.

Judge Baldwin denied the demurrer and was affirmed by the Minnesota Supreme Court on appeal.

=== First Minnesota Supreme Court decision ===
The State Supreme Court wrote that a scandalous publication "annoys, injures and endangers the comfort and repose of a considerable number of persons," and so constituted a nuisance just as surely as "places where intoxicating liquor is illegally sold," "houses of prostitution," "dogs," "malicious fences" "itinerant carnivals," "lotteries," and "noxious weeds." The court considered that a newspaper may also endanger safety, because "scandalous material" tended to disturb the peace and provoke assaults. The court cited previous Minnesota decisions that upheld the right of the state to enjoin the publication of "details of execution of criminals" and the teaching of "things injurious to society." Restricting the publication of a newspaper based on its harmful content accordingly fell within the legitimate power of "the people speaking through their representatives" to preserve "public morals" and the "public welfare." The court stated that it had to give heavy deference to such decisions, because "it is the prerogative of the legislature to determine not only what the public interests require but also the measures necessary to protect such interests."

Regarding Near and Guilford's defense of freedom of the press under article 1, section 3 of the Minnesota Constitution, the State Supreme Court did not believe that the right was intended to protect the publishing of "scandalous material", but that it only provided "a shield for the honest, careful and conscientious press," not the "defamer and the scandalmonger." Instead, "he who uses the press is responsible for its abuse." The court also ruled that the state constitution's due process clause did not extend any additional protection.

=== The trial court's decision after remand ===
The case then returned to the Hennepin County District Court, and Near and Guilford renewed their objection to the constitutionality of the Public Nuisance Law. Judge Baldwin again overruled their objection. Only the verified complaint that Olson had filed and the newspaper issues themselves were entered as evidence, and the defendants did not try to argue that the Saturday Press did not fit the definition under the statute, or that their published stories were in fact true. Baldwin ruled that the newspapers contained nothing but scandalous and defamatory material, and permanently enjoined the defendants "from producing, editing, publishing, circulating, having in their possession, selling or giving away any publication whatsoever which is a malicious, scandalous or defamatory newspaper, as defined by law," and also "from further conducting said nuisance under the name and title of said The Saturday Press or any other name or title."

=== Second Minnesota Supreme Court decision ===
[Robert R.] McCormick's attorney argued ... defaming the government is 'an inalienable privilege of national citizenship.'

On appeal once again, the Minnesota Supreme Court ruled that its first decision left little question as to the constitutionality of the statute, both under the defendants' state constitutional challenge and a new argument based on due process under the 14th Amendment to the U.S. Constitution. The defendants also argued that the trial court's injunction went too far because it effectively prevented them from operating any newspaper, but their appeal did not request a modification of the order. The court in any case disagreed with their interpretation of the order's scope, stating that it did allow them to publish a newspaper, so long as it was operated "in harmony with the public welfare."

Only Near appealed from this decision to the U.S. Supreme Court, thanks to last-minute financial help from Col. Robert R. McCormick, the publisher of the Chicago Tribune. A quotation from the U.S. Supreme Court's decision written by Hughes is engraved in the lobby of the Tribune today.

== The U.S. Supreme Court's decision ==
The U.S. Supreme Court, in a 5–4 decision, reversed the decision of the Minnesota Supreme Court and ruled that the Public Nuisance Law of 1925 was unconstitutional. The Court held that, except in rare cases, censorship is unconstitutional. The Court held:

For these reasons we hold the statute, so far as it authorized the proceedings in this action under clause (b) [723] of section one, to be an infringement of the liberty of the press guaranteed by the Fourteenth Amendment. We should add that this decision rests upon the operation and effect of the statute, without regard to the question of the truth of the charges contained in the particular periodical. The fact that the public officers named in this case, and those associated with the charges of official dereliction, may be deemed to be impeccable cannot affect the conclusion that the statute imposes an unconstitutional restraint upon publication.

Note that the paragraph above cites the Fourteenth Amendment and not the First Amendment. This is because the Fourteenth Amendment incorporates the First and makes it applicable to the States. As literally written, the First Amendment applies to Congress and the federal government, not the states.

This case strengthened the notion that a prior restraint of the press violates the First Amendment. However, it left a loophole which would be used later for other prior restraint cases, citing certain circumstances in which prior restraint could potentially be used:

The objection has also been made that the principle as to immunity from previous restraint is stated too broadly, if every such restraint is deemed to be prohibited. That is undoubtedly true; the protection even as to previous restraint is not absolutely unlimited. But the limitation has been recognized only in exceptional cases. 'When a nation is at war many things that might be said in time of peace are such a hindrance to its effort that their utterance will not be endured so long as men fight and that no Court could regard them as protected by any constitutional right.' (Schenck v. United States, 1919). No one would question but that a government might prevent actual obstruction to its recruiting service or the publication of the sailing dates of transports or the number and location of troops. On similar grounds, the primary requirements of decency may be enforced against obscene publications. The security of the community life may be protected against incitements to acts of violence and the overthrow by force of orderly government.

Hughes (Ct):

...the fact that liberty of press may be abused does not make any less necessary the immunity of the press from prior restraint ... a more serious evil would result if officials could determine which stories can be published ...

== Subsequent developments ==
Near returned to publishing The Saturday Press, calling it "the paper that refused to stay gagged". Guilford later joined the staff of the Twin City Reporter. He continued to draw the ire of organized crime in Minneapolis and was shot and killed on September 6, 1934.

The Court closed off one of the few outlets remaining to censor the press under Near in New York Times Co. v. Sullivan (1964), which seriously limited the grounds upon which a public official could sue for libel. Statements made regarding their official conduct were only actionable if made with "actual malice", meaning a knowing or reckless disregard for the truth.

Hustler Magazine v. Falwell (1988) excluded parodies from even this limited standard, as they included no actionable statements of fact. Hustler made clear this protection extended beyond merely defamation suits to cover other torts such as intentional infliction of emotional distress.

== Basic case law resulting from this case ==
No prior restraint of the content of news by the government is allowed unless it reveals crucial military information, contains obscenity, or may directly incite "acts of violence".

== See also ==
- List of United States Supreme Court cases, volume 279
- Pentagon Papers
- Yellow journalism
- Muckraking
- Kid Cann
