= John F. Williams =

United States Army general (1887–1953)

John Francis Williams
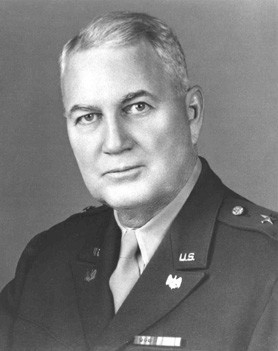
- Born: January 7, 1887; Wilkes-Barre, Pennsylvania, US
- Died: May 29, 1953 (aged 66); Pasadena, California, US
- Burial place: Arlington National Cemetery
- Military career
- Branch: United States Army
- Service years: 1903–1904; 1917–1919; 1921–1946
- Rank: Major General
- Units: Missouri National Guard; National Guard Bureau
- Commands: 196th Infantry Brigade; Chief of the National Guard Bureau
- Conflicts: World War I World War II
- Awards: Army Distinguished Service Medal
- Other work: Journalist

John Francis Williams (January 7, 1887 – May 29, 1953) was an Army National Guard Major General who served as Chief of the National Guard Bureau during World War II.

== Early life ==
John Francis Williams was born in Wilkes-Barre, Pennsylvania on January 7, 1887, and raised in Pierce City, Missouri. He enlisted in the 2nd Infantry Regiment of the Missouri National Guard in March 1903 and was discharged in September 1904 with the rank of private.

He worked as the manager of zinc mines in Missouri until attending college, graduating from the University of Missouri in 1911. He then became a reporter and editor for the St. Louis Star and other Missouri newspapers.

== World War I ==
When the United States entered World War I in April 1917, he was commissioned a first lieutenant in the 128th Machine Gun Battalion, 35th Infantry Division, and served in France until returning home in 1919.

Following the war, Williams became a reporter for the Kansas City Star and editor for the Joplin Globe, later the Joplin News-Herald.

== Post World War I ==
From 1922 to 1936 Williams was director of publications for the University of Missouri.

Williams again entered the military when he was appointed major in June 1921 and became commander of the 128th Field Artillery Regiment with the rank of colonel in April 1923.

In 1935 he was appointed Deputy Chief of the National Guard Bureau as a brigadier general, and also served as Chief of the National Guard Bureau's Regulations and Personnel Divisions. In 1936 he acted as Chief of the National Guard Bureau prior to Albert H. Blanding assuming the post.

== World War II ==
He was appointed as Chief of the National Guard Bureau in January 1940, with the rank of major general, and served for the entire duration of the US involvement in World War II.

During his tenure Williams lobbied to ensure that the National Guard would be considered in the Army's post-war plans, and that it would be included in the newly organized United States Air Force.

== Awards and decorations ==
Williams received the Distinguished Service Medal in recognition of his World War II service.

== Death and burial ==
Following retirement in January 1946, Williams moved to Pasadena, California, where he died from cancer on May 29, 1953. Williams and his wife Mary Way Williams (1889–1952) are buried at Arlington National Cemetery

Military offices
| Preceded by Herold J. Weiler | Chief of the National Guard Bureau; 1936 | Succeeded by Albert H. Blanding |
| Preceded by Albert H. Blanding | Chief of the National Guard Bureau; 1940–1946 | Succeeded by Butler B. Miltonberger |
