= Thomas F. Gallagher =

American judge

- Gallaghar in 1938

Associate Justice of the Minnesota Supreme Court
- In office 1943–1967

Personal details
- Born: November 24, 1897 Faribault, Minnesota, U.S.
- Died: March 3, 1985 (aged 87)
- Party: Democratic
- Education: Saint Thomas Academy; University of Minnesota (BA); University of Minnesota Law School (LLB)
- Profession: Judge

Thomas Francis Gallagher (November 24, 1897 in Faribault, Minnesota – March 3, 1985) was a justice of the Minnesota Supreme Court from 1943 until his retirement in 1967.

== Early life and education ==
Gallagher attended Saint Thomas Academy, then located in Saint Paul, Minnesota (1912–1914) but graduated from Faribault High School in 1915 (it is not clear why he left St. Thomas). He earned his B.A. in 1919 from the University of Minnesota after having interrupted his schooling in 1918 to serve as a commissioned officer in the United States Field Artillery. In 1921 he was graduated from the University of Minnesota Law School with an LL.B. He practiced law in Minneapolis from 1921 until 1942, at first with his uncle, John E. Tappan, the founder of Investors Diversified Services, Inc. ("IDS," then called the Investors Syndicate) now called Ameriprise Financial, Inc. In 1929, Judge Gallagher opened his own law office in Minneapolis, where he practiced until 1942.

== Career ==
In 1936, Judge Gallagher was the Democratic Party's candidate for the office of Attorney General. He led the Minnesota campaign for President Franklin D. Roosevelt, speaking from a sound truck-trailer on street corners in more than 400 Minnesota villages, towns and cities. In 1938, he was the Democratic Party's candidate for Governor of Minnesota. This was prior to the merger of the Democratic and Farmer Labor parties, now known as the DFL. The Farmer-Labor, and Republican Party candidates received a higher percentage of the vote, than the Democratic candidates for most statewide offices at the time. In 1939 and 1940 Gallagher led a drive promoting the merger of the two parties. Judge Gallagher promoted the ideas and platform of the national Democratic Party, but also was one of the first to espouse merger of the two liberal state political parties. In 1940 he served as Minnesota delegate at large at the Democratic national convention in Chicago. The Minnesota Democratic Party and the Farmer–Labor Party did eventually merge on April 15, 1944. Shortly before he died, Franklin D. Roosevelt had appointed Judge Gallagher to serve on the United States District Court, but U.S. Senator Joseph H. Ball, blocked the appointment. Senator Ball was a political ally of fellow Republican Harold Stassen, and disapproved of the domestic policies of F.D.R. and his successor, Harry S. Truman.

Thomas Francis Gallagher was elected as an associate justice of the Minnesota Supreme Court in 1943, and re-elected thereafter until his retirement in 1967. During his twenty-four years on the Court, Judge Gallagher participated in more than 4,000 decisions and personally wrote over 600 majority and dissenting opinions. Judge Gallagher's work on the Court received praise from many. Professor Brainerd Currie of Duke University Law School wrote that Justices Thomas Gallagher, Harlan Stone, Robert H. Jackson and Roger Traynor were "among the modern Justices whose work has contributed to the enlightenment and to the cause of justice and reason in the conflict of laws." (13 Stanford Law Review 719.) Judge Gallagher's opinions are regarded by many members of the Minnesota bar as notable for their clarity and brevity. Judge Gallagher also took pride in mentoring his law clerks to think and write clearly. His law clerks who later obtained prominence include Harry M. Walsh, Minnesota Revisor of Statutes, and Walter F. Mondale, Vice President of the United States.

When the Court was in recess, Judge Gallagher served on Presidential Emergency Boards created by President Harry S. Truman to avert railway strikes. He served as President of the Minnesota Safety Council for seven years. In 1948, he was Chairman of the Minnesota Branch of the National Conference of Christians and Jews. He was active in the American Legion, serving as Commander of Downtown Post 335, and as Judge Advocate for its Fifth District. Each year, he conducted panels for Legion-sponsored "Boys' State," in which he outlined for the young delegates the structure, procedure and jurisdiction of the state and federal courts. In 1962, he served as President of the University of Minnesota Law School Alumni Association.

Party political offices
Vacant Title last held by John E. Regan (1934)	Democratic nominee for Governor of Minnesota; 1938	Succeeded by Edward Murphy
Vacant Title last held by Alric Anderson	Democratic nominee for Minnesota Attorney General; 1936	Succeeded by John D. Sullivan
