= J. E. Meyers =

American politician (1862–1944)

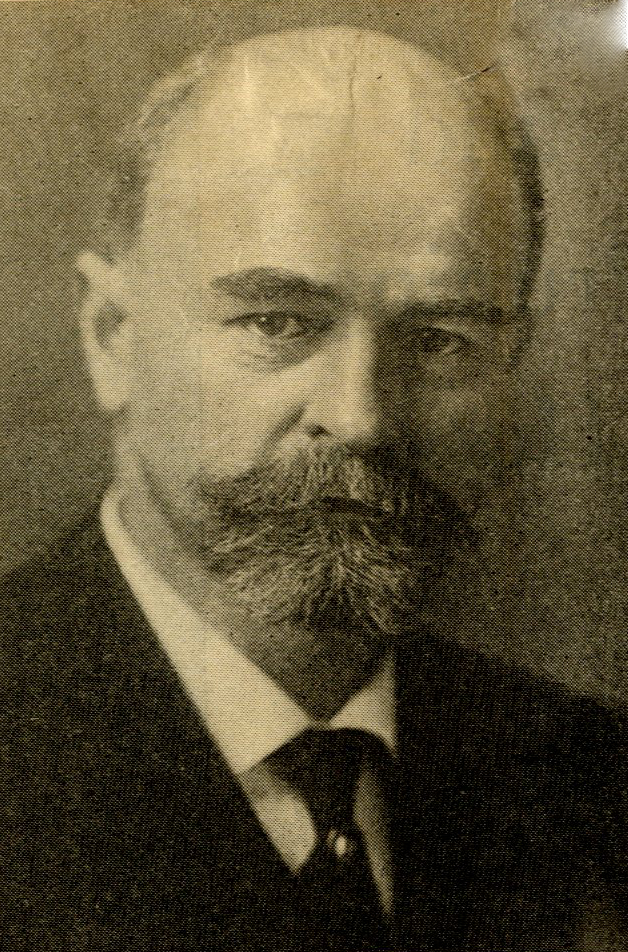
- Meyers in 1919

27th Mayor of Minneapolis
- In office 1919–1921
- Preceded by: Thomas Van Lear
- Succeeded by: George E. Leach

Personal details
- Born: J. Edward Meyers; December 22, 1862 Dayton, Ohio, U.S.
- Died: June 11, 1944 (aged 81) Minneapolis, Minnesota, U.S.
- Resting place: Lakewood Cemetery
- Party: Loyalist
- Education: University of Minnesota Law School
- Profession: insurance salesman

J. Edward Meyers (December 22, 1862 – June 11, 1944) was an American insurance salesman, philanthropist, and politician and the 27th mayor of Minneapolis.

== Early life and education ==
Meyers was born on December 22, 1862, in Dayton, Ohio. He was educated in local schools in Dayton and moved to Minnesota in 1882, living for a time in Duluth, St. Paul, and finally moving to Minneapolis in 1888. He graduated from the University of Minnesota Law School.

== Career ==
After moving to Minneapolis in 1888, Meyers began a career in the insurance business with Aetna. In 1918, Meyers ran for mayor on a patriotic platform supporting America's soldiers in World War I dubbed the "Loyalty Party." He defeated socialist incumbent Thomas Van Lear and served for a single term, working particularly hard to get the city council to approve his nominees to the city's first planning commission and to ensure returning military veterans were able to find housing and jobs. He did not run for re-election but later became involved in the city's board of education and board of estimate.

Meyers served as the Minnesota manager of Aetna for 28 years. From 1925 to 1931, he was a member of the board of education and from 1931 to 1935, he was a member of the estimate board. He proposed a state song for Minnesota and advocated for the restoration of Minnehaha Falls by cementing its creek bed.

== Personal life ==
Meyers died on June 11, 1944, at the Swedish Hospital in Minneapolis. Just a month before his death, it was revealed that Meyers has been the anonymous benefactor behind a Minneapolis-based group called "Youth, Incorporated" which provided Americanist materials to Minneapolis children. He was buried in Lakewood Cemetery.
