= Thomas E. Latimer =

American lawyer and politician (1879–1937)

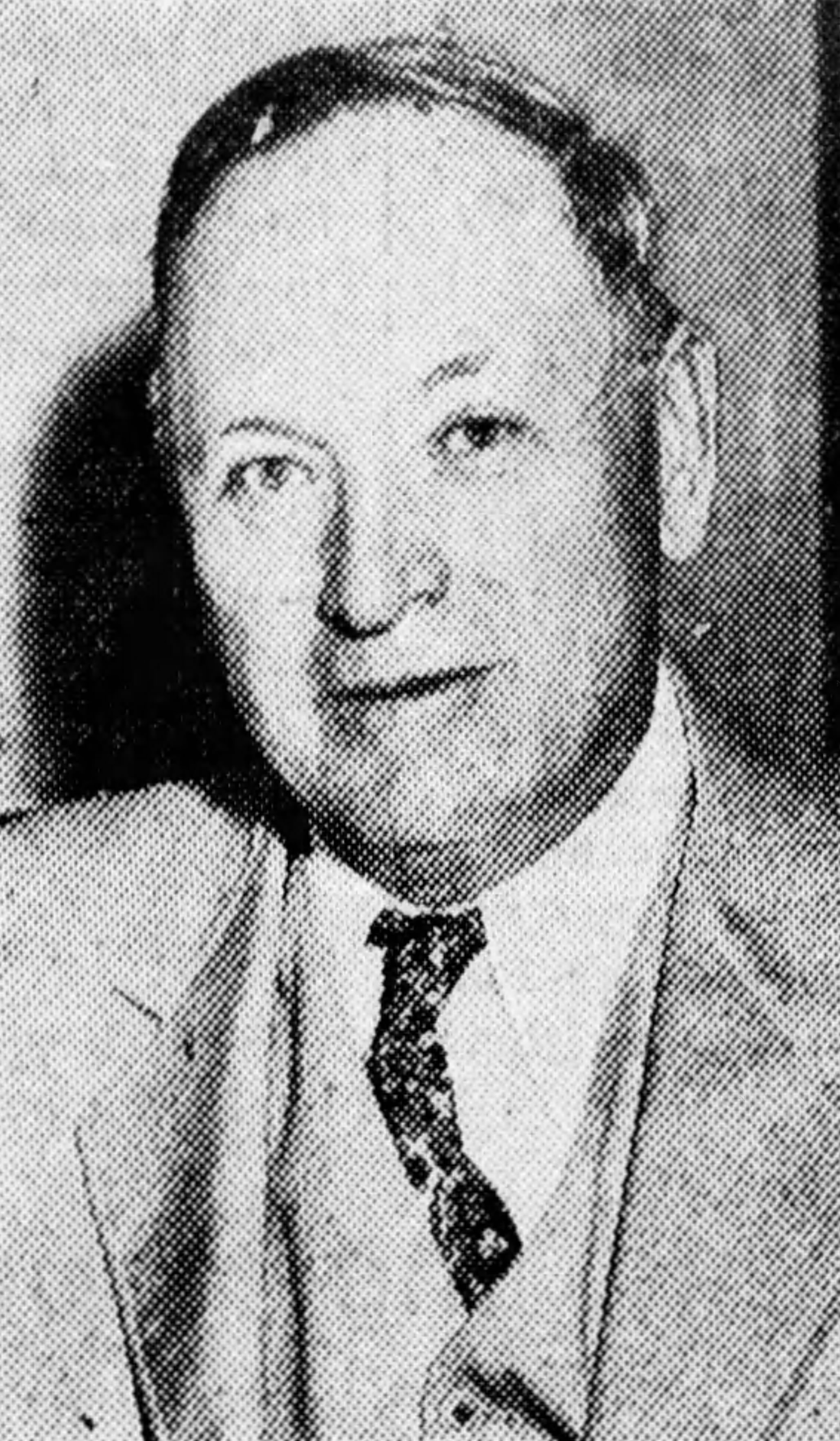
- Latimer in 1935

32nd Mayor of Minneapolis
- In office July 8, 1935 – July 4, 1937
- Preceded by: A. G. Bainbridge
- Succeeded by: George E. Leach

State Secretary of the Socialist Party of Minnesota
- In office 1912–1914
- Preceded by: Jay E. Nash
- Succeeded by: Fred Miller

Personal details
- Born: April 6, 1879 Hilliard, Ohio, U.S.
- Died: November 6, 1937 (aged 58) Minneapolis, Minnesota, U.S.
- Party: Farmer-Labor
- Other political affiliations: Socialist (before 1919)
- Spouse(s): May Helser (1905, divorce); Elsie Henry (?-1932, her death); Mildred Unger (1934-1937, his death)
- Children: 1

Thomas Erwin Latimer (April 6, 1879 – November 6, 1937) was an American politician and lawyer who served as the Minnesota Farmer–Labor Party mayor of Minneapolis from 1935 to 1937. His mayoral term coincided with a period of labor unrest in the city. Prior to that, Latimer worked as a lawyer on the freedom of the press dispute that ultimately resulted in the Supreme Court's landmark decision in Near v. Minnesota. Latimer is of no direct relation to former St. Paul mayor George Latimer.

== Early life ==
Latimer was born in 1879 on a farm in Hilliard, Ohio. He attended Ohio State University and played football there until his father's death, after which he returned to the family farm. He taught at a school for a brief period before joining the Klondike Gold Rush at the age of 20. He then moved on to work in silver and lead mines in Idaho and gold mines in Mexico.

Latimer returned to Ohio in 1905. There he married a woman from Hilliard named May Helser. The couple divorced three months later, and in 1906 May bore a son. Latimer had reportedly lost touch with his former wife, but heard that May's son had allegedly died. The falsity of the allegations would not be revealed to Latimer until 30 years later. As Time magazine reported in 1935, Latimer's son, Ira - at that time a Chicago radio news commentator who had suspected that Thomas was his father and had been brought up as Ira Jenkins by his mother and her second husband - read of Latimer's election as Minneapolis mayor and became convinced of his paternity upon learning that Thomas had been born in Hilliard. As the brief Time write-up noted, when confronted with his son Ira, Thomas Latimer "demanded proof, got it" and thus among the "chief guests at his inauguration...were his son, daughter-in-law, [and] two-year-old grandson." Ira Latimer, as he became known, was a lawyer, minister, and civil rights activist.

After breaking with May Helser, Latimer had continued his education. He earned bachelor's and master's degrees and served as school superintendent in Juneau, Alaska. Latimer eventually left Alaska and returned to the United States in 1912 (the same year Alaska was granted territorial status) where he would embark on a career in law.

== Legal career and Near v. Minnesota ==
Latimer studied law at the University of Minnesota. It was there that he met his second wife, Elsie Henry. They graduated law school, took the bar exam together, and then opened the law firm of Latimer & Latimer. They apparently did not have any children. Elsie would die five years before Thomas in 1932.

By the 1920s Latimer was "a prominent Minneapolis attorney." Arguably his most important work came in a years-long freedom of the press dispute that culminated in the critical Supreme Court ruling in Near v. Minnesota. The case stemmed from an attempt by then-Hennepin County Attorney Floyd B. Olson (later the Governor of Minnesota and leading light of the Minnesota Farmer-Labor Party) to place an injunction against a Minneapolis newspaper, The Saturday Press. Published by Jay M. Near and Howard A. Guilford and known for its anti-Semitism, anti-Communism and propensity to attack supposedly corrupt local officials such as mayor George E. Leach and police chief Frank W. Brunskill, The Saturday Press was a ripe target for Minnesota's new Public Nuisance Law of 1925. Also known as the "Minnesota Gag Law," the statute provided permanent injunctions against those who published, sold, distributed, or had in their possession any "malicious, scandalous and defamatory newspaper." A temporary injunction was granted against The Saturday Press and it was forced to cease publication pending further legal proceedings.

While Latimer was hardly a partisan of The Saturday Press, he did sympathize with their cause and was - as Near v. Minnesota chronicler Fred Friendly would later put it - "a kind of self-appointed Legal Aid Society." Under Latimer's advice, publishers Near and Guilford demurred in reply to the restraining order. While still abiding by that order in that they ceased publication, they argued that the temporary injunction was unconstitutional and did "not state facts sufficient to constitute a cause of action" on the part of the court.

In the hearing over the demurrer on December 1, 1927, Latimer argued that the Public Nuisance Law was "a subterfuge voted by the 1925 Legislature to get away from the state's constitution and libel laws..." He pointed out that "There are only two other countries in the world today with a statute similar to the one at issue...Italy and Russia." The latter comment was an ironic reference to a recent editorial in the influential Minneapolis Tribune, which had railed against the lack of press freedom in Benito Mussolini's Italy yet supported the Public Nuisance Law.

Judge Mathias Baldwin rejected the demurrer two weeks after the hearing. However, he certified the case to the Minnesota Supreme Court, leaving it to that body to decide the question of the law's constitutionality. As Friendly would later note, "By demurring, Latimer had opened the door for appeal, and by certifying the case, Judge Baldwin had kept the litigation alive..." The case came before the Minnesota Supreme Court on April 28, 1928, at which time Latimer argued that the Public Nuisance Law violated the Minnesota constitution and was "null, void, and invalid, being in contravention of the Fourteenth Amendment to the Constitution of the United States." The Minnesota court rejected this argument and affirmed the constitutionality of the law. However more powerful forces would soon pick up the fight against Minnesota's Public Nuisance Law (including the American Civil Liberties Union and the publisher of the Chicago Tribune) and take the case to the U.S. Supreme Court. It marked the first time that a freedom of the press case involving prior restraints had made it to the high court. The Supreme Court, in what is widely hailed as a critical victory for freedom of the press, ultimately ruled that the Public Nuisance Law was unconstitutional. Though Latimer did not argue the case before the Court, it was the original demurrer he filed early in the case that created the basis on which the successful constitutional challenge would proceed.

== Minnesota Farmer-Labor Party, mayoralty, and later life ==
By the mid-1930s Latimer was a veteran politician of the Minnesota Farmer-Labor Party and successfully ran for mayor of Minneapolis in 1935. Though more liberal than his Republican predecessor A. G. Bainbridge, Latimer partially continued the antilabor policies of the city police and also adopted a more restrictive approach toward welfare spending. These actions alienated labor groups and some traditional liberals. Minneapolis Communists in the Popular Front faction of the Farmer-Labor party also found themselves in opposition to Latimer after he joined the Committee for the Defense of Leon Trotsky, the exiled Soviet politician and staunch opponent of Stalin and the Comintern.

During Latimer's first months in office, Minneapolis was wracked by labor unrest. Workers at the Flour City Ornamental Iron Works went on strike in July 1935, and when the company refused to arbitrate and brought in scab workers, the situation quickly became violent. To the surprise of some, given that he was a member of the Farmer-Labor Party, Latimer granted a request by the company for police protection. Soon there were complaints that the police were dealing with striking workers too violently, and after police fired into a crowd and killed two bystanders Latimer withdrew the police protection and closed the plant. His political future had been endangered as a result of the police actions, and Latimer "dared not offend labor further," as Floyd B. Olson's biographer George Mayer noted.

A second strike began soon after at the Strutwear Knitting Mills. This time Latimer refused the owner's request for police protection and spoke against the refusal of Strutwear officials to negotiate. Latimer attempted to broker a resumption of negotiations, but the unwillingness of company officials to compromise (combined with the unified front put up by labor in the city) made that impossible. Ultimately the Strutwear strike was resolved in favor of the workers, as was the dispute at the Flour City Ornamental Iron Works. These were key victories for the Minneapolis labor movement at the time, though Latimer played a somewhat conflicted role which may have cost him labor support.

Latimer sought re-election, but more left-wing elements of the party associated with the Popular Front had gained control of the Hennepin County Farmer-Labor Alliance. Displeased with Latimer's administration, this group sought to deny him the support necessary to secure re-nomination as the Farmer-Labor candidate for mayor. Popular Front supporters backed Kenneth Haycraft for the nomination, while other elements of the party sided with Latimer. As a result two separate nominating conventions were held which both claimed legitimacy. In arguments before the Farmer-Labor Association State Committee over which convention would be recognized, Latimer supporters "attempted to discredit the Haycraft convention by citing the presence of delegates who had signed petitions to put Communist candidates on the Minnesota ballot in 1936." This tactic would prove unsuccessful as the State Committee supported the Haycraft convention and Latimer ultimately lost the primary. Haycraft was roundly defeated by the Republican candidate, retired Major General and former mayor George E. Leach, in the general election.

Having failed in his bid for re-election, Latimer left office in July 1937. At the time he was living with his third wife, Mildred Unger, whom he had married two years after Elsie Henry's death in 1932 (they had met when Latimer worked as Unger's attorney in her divorce with her previous husband). Four months after leaving office, at the age of 58, Latimer died suddenly of sleeping sickness. According to his obituary, "So deceptive was the illness that he attended the Minnesota-Notre Dame football game a week ago in Memorial stadium."

== Latimer family Bible ==
Nearly 70 years after his death, Latimer's name was once again briefly in the Minneapolis press. In 2004 a woman from Arkansas had in her possession an ornate, leather-bound Bible that once belonged to Latimer (her husband had found the Bible ten years earlier in a pile of discarded books in a San Diego alley). The woman, Teri Norton-Feaser, spent some time trying to track down a relative who would want the Bible, saying she had "called every Latimer in the Minneapolis phone book and e-mailed everybody I could" but had not located anyone directly related to Thomas. Former St. Paul mayor George Latimer was among the Latimers contacted. He had researched his genealogy and was sure that "[Thomas Latimer] and I are not from the same line, but I suppose we could be 15th cousins."

After the Minneapolis Star Tribune ran a story about the Latimer family Bible, two women contacted the paper to claim it: Dorothy Unger Hesli, 85, who was 15 years old when her mother Mildred Unger married Thomas, and Eloise White Saslaw, 83, who was a distant relative - perhaps a great niece of Latimer. Because she had actually known Latimer and was quite fond of him, Hesli was ultimately given the Bible. Hesli noted that she thought she could remember the Bible from her teenage years living with her sister, mother, and Latimer in Minneapolis, however she had no idea how it ended up in a pile of old books in California.

== See also ==
- List of mayors of Minneapolis

Political offices
Preceded by A. G. Bainbridge	Mayor of Minneapolis; 1935 – 1937	Succeeded by George E. Leach
Party political offices
Preceded by Jay E. Nash	State Secretary of the Socialist Party of Minnesota; 1912 – 1914	Succeeded by Fred Miller
Preceded by Frederick F. Lindsay	Socialist Party of Minnesota candidate for U.S. Representative from Minnesota's 5th congressional district 1912 (lost)	Succeeded by Thomas Van Lear
Preceded by Thomas Van Lear	Socialist Party of Minnesota candidate for U.S. Representative from Minnesota's 5th congressional district 1916 (lost)	Succeeded by George Riedel (1934)
