= 1938 Minnesota gubernatorial election =

- November 8, 1938
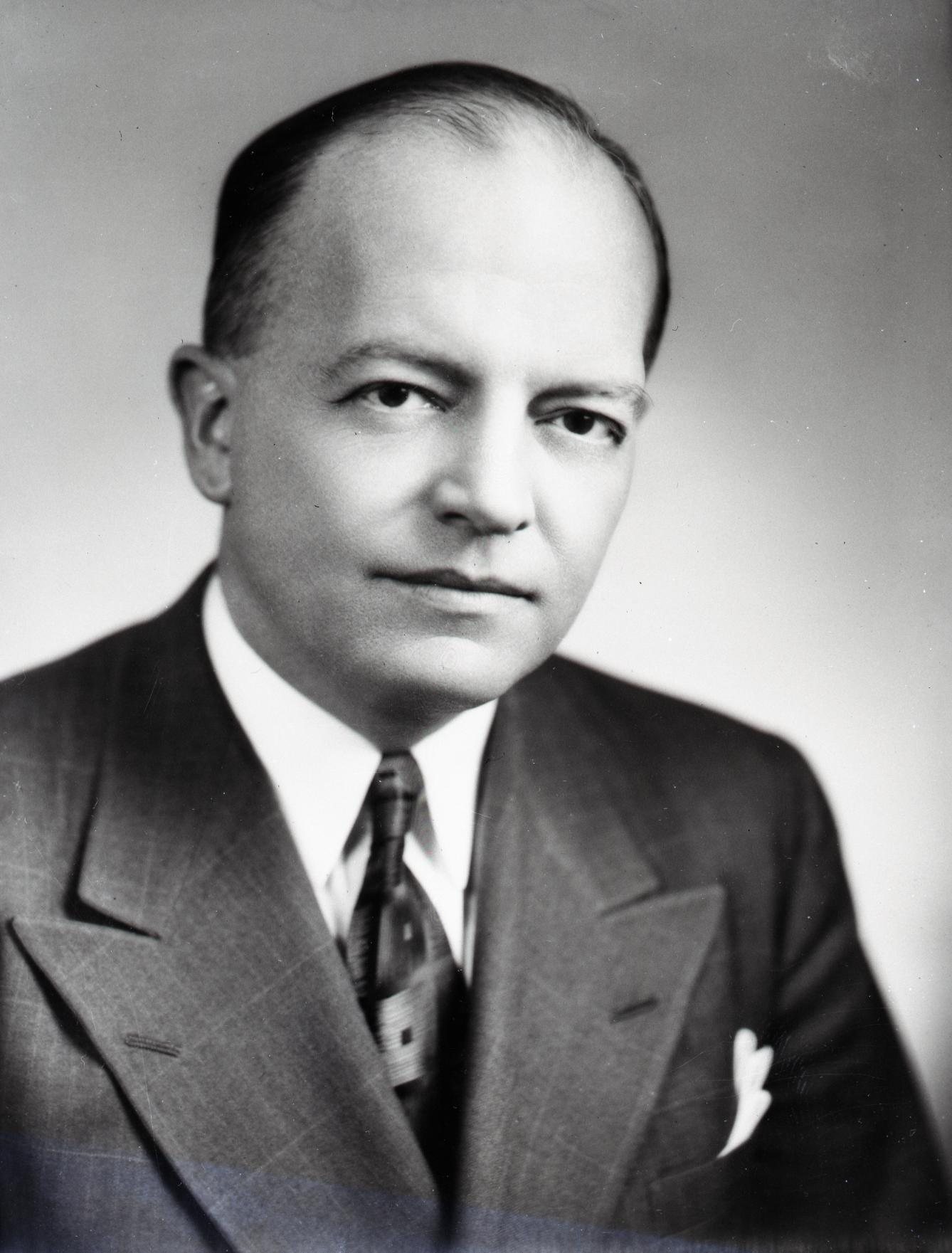

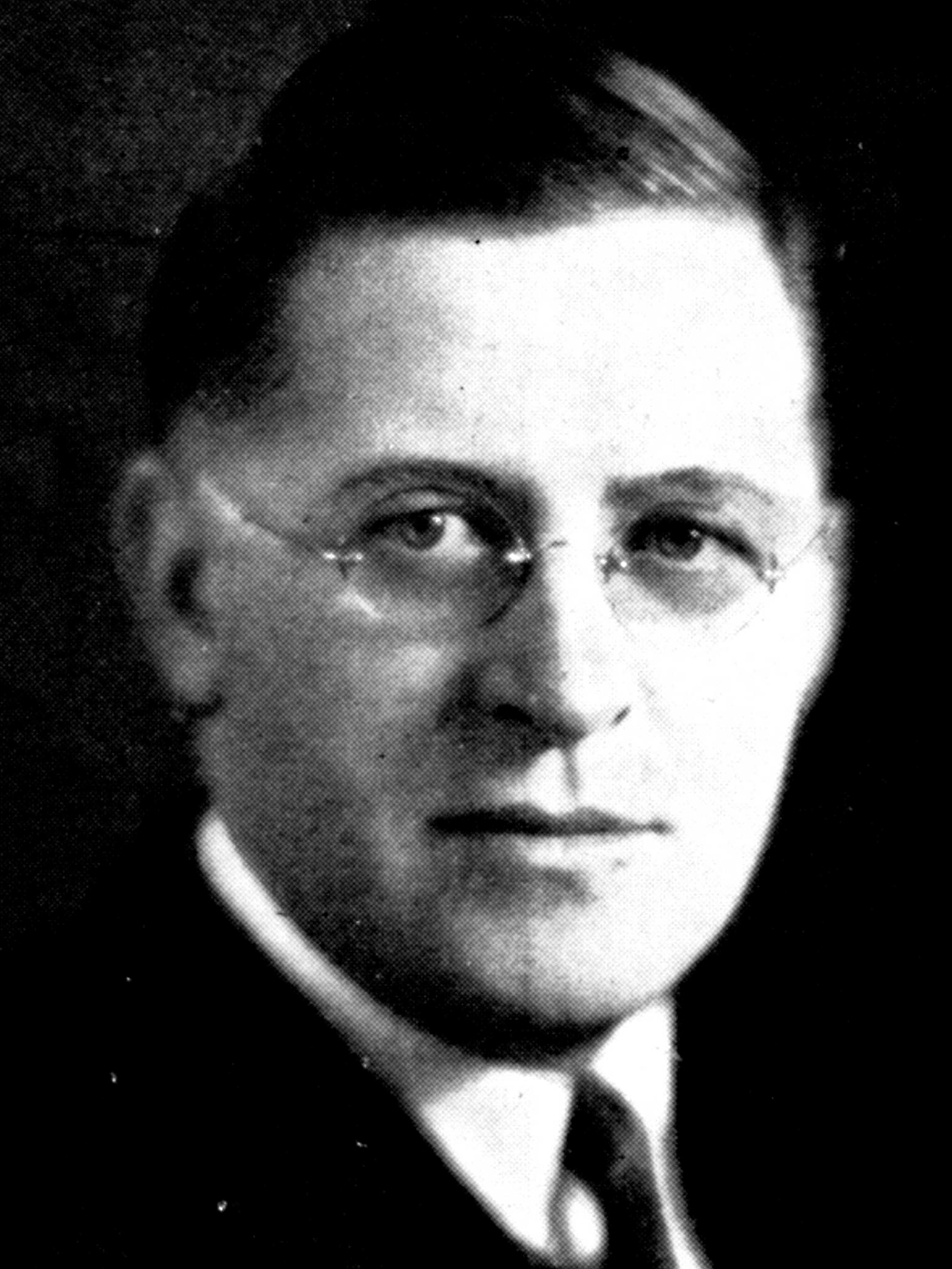

Nominee	Harold Stassen	Elmer Benson	Thomas F. Gallagher
Party	Republican	Farmer–Labor	Democratic
Popular vote	678,839	387,263	65,875
Percentage	59.92%	34.18%	5.81%
- County results Stassen: 40–50% 50–60% 60–70% 70–80% 80–90% Benson 40–50% 50–60%
Governor before election
Elmer Benson
Farmer–Labor
Elected Governor
Harold Stassen
Republican

The 1938 Minnesota gubernatorial election took place on November 8, 1938. Republican candidate Harold Stassen defeated Farmer-Labor incumbent Elmer Benson. Benson ran for a second term.

== Farmer-Labor primary ==
The Farmer-Labor primary election was between incumbent governor Elmer Benson and former governor Hjalmar Petersen.

=== Candidates ===
==== Nominated ====
- Elmer Benson, incumbent

=== Eliminated in primary ===
- Hjalmar Petersen, former governor

=== Results ===
Farmer-Labor Party of Minnesota primary results
Party	Candidate	Votes	%
Farmer–Labor	Elmer Benson	218,235	51.91%
Farmer–Labor	Hjalmar Petersen	202,205	48.09%
Total votes		420,440	100%

== Republican primary ==
The Republican primary election was held with four candidates. Harold Stassen won the election with a 47.42% plurality.

=== Candidates ===
==== Nominated ====
- Harold Stassen, Dakota County attorney

=== Eliminated in primary ===
- George E. Leach, mayor of Minneapolis
- Martin A. Nelson, attorney and Republican gubernatorial candidate in 1934, and 1936
- Harson A. Northrup, pseudoscientist

=== Results ===
Republican Party of Minnesota primary results
Party	Candidate	Votes	%
Republican	Harold Stassen	123,634	47.42%
Republican	Martin A. Nelson	76,532	29.36%
Republican	George E. Leach	57,028	21.88%
Republican	Harson A. Northrup	3,501	1.34%
Total votes		260,695	100%

== Democratic primary ==
=== Candidates ===
==== Nominated ====
- Thomas F. Gallagher, attorney

=== Eliminated in primary ===
- Joel F. Anderson, employee of the Railroad and Warehouse Commission (Farmer-Labor)
- Victor Emanuel Anderson, former assistant attorney general
- Michael F. Murray, former head of the Minnesota department of the American Legion
- Fred Schilplin, newspaper editor
- Charles A. Lethert, former clerk of the Supreme Court

=== Results ===
Democratic Party of Minnesota primary results
Party	Candidate	Votes	%
Democratic	Thomas F. Gallagher	23,240	29.23%
Democratic	Fred Schilplin	20,209	25.41%
Democratic	Michael F. Murray	17,722	22.29%
Democratic	Victor Emanuel Anderson	10,321	12.98%
Democratic	Charles A. Lethert	4,658	5.86%
Democratic	Joel F. Anderson	3,369	4.24%
Total votes		79,519	100%

== Candidates ==
- Elmer Benson, incumbent (Farmer-Labor)
- John William Castle, painter (Industrial)
- Thomas F. Gallagher, attorney (Democrat)
- Harold Stassen, Dakota County attorney (Republican)

== Campaigns ==
Incumbent Benson found his position weakened in 1938. President Franklin D. Roosevelt did not endorse him for a second term, and former governor and primary opponent Hjalmar Petersen refused to fall in line with him. Former political allies from Wisconsin, Governor Philip La Follette and Senator Robert M. La Follette Jr., also broke with Benson, openly preferring Stassen. The La Follettes sought to unite the Farmer-Labor party with the Wisconsin Progressive Party into the National Progressives of America, with candidates already slated in Iowa. Benson refused the union, resulting in the collapse of relations between the two.

Stassen called Benson's administration "the three R's; reactionary, radical, and racketeering." Benson explained his reasoning as: reactionary as in Benson's ideological control of the Farmer-Labor party; radical in its encouragement of strikes, which Stassen claimed were 'violent', and racketeering as in attempts to implement sales tax and liquor tax. Stassen further accused Benson's administration of being more focused on maintaining control than benefitting the people.

Benson attacked Stassen for his call for "tolerance", stating that this was nothing more than tolerating special interests, big banks, and big business. Benson stated, "You cannot serve God and Mammon."

One local Farmer-Laborite leader from Floodwood, S. B. Ruohoniemi, had endorsed Stassen and other Republican candidates. Ruohoniemi allenged that a group of fellow Farmer-Laborites accused him of being a traitor, and went as far as threatening his life.

In early October, Stassen proposed a debate with Benson that would have been the first gubernatorial debate in Minnesotan history. Benson refused.

Stassen's image was heavily impacted by a strike that happened while he was Dakota County commissioner, in November of 1933. A strike in South St. Paul by 1,233 workers of Armour and Company was poorly resolved by Stassen after he ordered the illegal arrests and raids of union leaders. The strike was broken, the workers returned to work with no new compensation, and the strike leaders were blacklisted from jobs. However, the compliance board chairman of the National Recovery Administration, M. J. O'Toole, argued instead that Stassen was uninvolved in the raids or arrests, and fought for the re-instatement of the workers, bringing the issues to the National Labor Relations Board (NLRB) on behalf of the workers when the NLRB was founded in 1935.

A group of Stassen supporters, led by Ray P. Chase, ran an anti-semetic campaign against Benson. Chase collaborated with the Silver Shirts, and their campaign argued that Benson's administration would bring about 'Jewish Communism'. The Silver Shirts threatened that if Benson could not be defeated in the election, then they would violently attempt to depose him.

== Results ==
1938 gubernatorial election, Minnesota
Party	Candidate	Votes	%	±%
Republican	Harold Stassen	678,839	59.92%	+21.37%
Farmer–Labor	Elmer Benson (incumbent)	387,263	34.18%	−26.55%
Democratic	Thomas F. Gallagher	65,875	5.81%	n/a
Industrial	John William Castle	899	0.08%	−0.63%
Majority		291,576	25.74%	
Turnout		1,132,876		
Republican gain from Farmer–Labor		Swing		

== See also ==
- List of Minnesota gubernatorial elections
