= William A. Anderson =

American judge

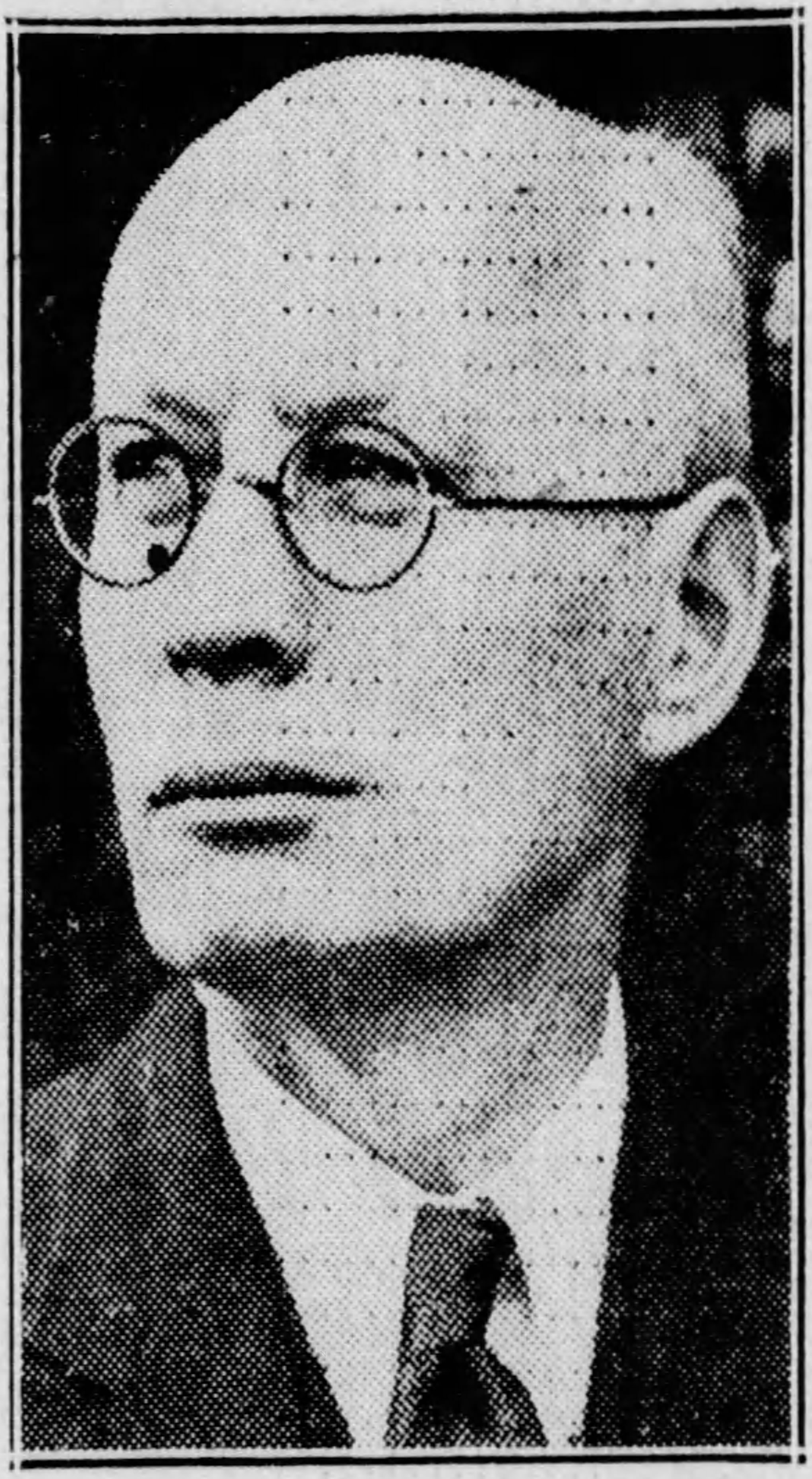
- Anderson c. 1931

30th Mayor of Minneapolis
- In office 1931–1933
- Preceded by: William F. Kunze
- Succeeded by: A. G. Bainbridge

Personal details
- Born: October 19, 1873 Adams County, Wisconsin, U.S.
- Died: December 12, 1954 (aged 81) Minneapolis, Minnesota, U.S.
- Resting place: Lakewood Cemetery
- Party: Farmer–Labor
- Education: Northwestern College of Law
- Profession: Lawyer, farmer, judge

William A. Anderson (October 19, 1873 – December 12, 1954) was a politician and judge who served as the 30th mayor of Minneapolis.

== Life and career ==
Anderson was born to Daniel and Cynthia Anderson on October 19, 1873 in Adams County, Wisconsin. After working as a teacher for several years, he moved to Minneapolis in 1909 to work in the grain milling industry. He attended the Northwestern College of Law and was admitted to the bar in 1914. After graduating he became a law professor and also became involved in politics, winning election to the Minneapolis Park Board in 1916.

In 1919, North Dakota governor Lynn Frazier asked Anderson to relocate there to support the development of the North Dakota Mill and Elevator (citing Anderson's experience in both grain milling and law). He later served as the Assistant North Dakota Attorney General and the secretary of the state's industrial commission. While working there, Anderson also became involved in the formation of the Nonpartisan League.

He returned to Minnesota in the mid-1920s and formed a law practice. In 1931, he was elected mayor of Minneapolis as a member of the Minnesota Farmer–Labor Party. Anderson ran on a law and order platform pledging to improve the performance of the city's police department. During his term he refused to interfere in the Arthur and Edith Lee House race rioting, and banned the play Crazy Quilt starring Fanny Brice from being performed in the city. In 1933, he was challenged for mayor by local theater promoter A. G. Bainbridge and was defeated.

Following his tenure as mayor, he went on to work with the state's income tax department and as a special investigator with the state tax commission. He was appointed a municipal judge in 1936 and a district court judge in 1943. Anderson retired from his judgeship in 1952 and died at his home in Minneapolis in 1954. He is buried at Lakewood Cemetery in Minneapolis.

Political offices
Preceded by William F. Kunze	Mayor of Minneapolis; 1931 – 1933	Succeeded by A. G. Bainbridge
