= William F. Kunze =

American politician (1872–1962)

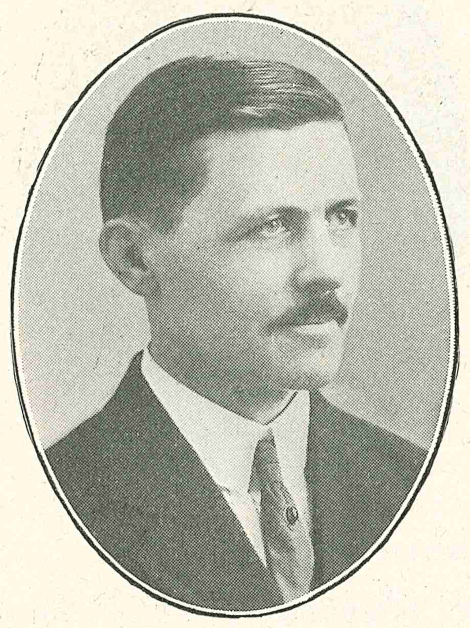
- Kunze in 1911

29th Mayor of Minneapolis
- In office July 8, 1929 – July 5, 1931
- Preceded by: George E. Leach
- Succeeded by: William A. Anderson

Personal details
- Born: June 1, 1872 Sleepy Eye, Minnesota, U.S.
- Died: February 14, 1962 (aged 89) Minneapolis, Minnesota, U.S.
- Party: Republican
- Education: University of Minnesota
- Profession: educator

William F. Kunze (June 1, 1872 – February 14, 1962) was an educator, banker and Republican politician who served in the Minnesota House of Representatives from 1911 to 1913 and as mayor of Minneapolis from 1929 to 1931.

== Life and career ==
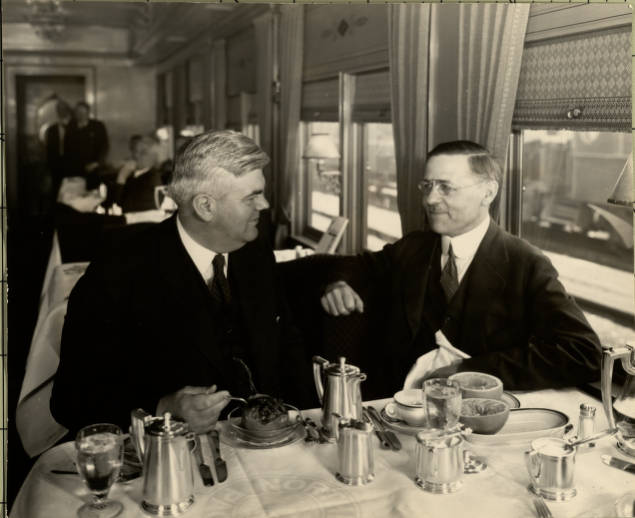
Governor Christianson and Kunze, 1930

Kunze was born in 1872 in Sleepy Eye, Minnesota to Fred Kunze and Minnie Kunze (née Krueger). He attended school in New Ulm, Minnesota before moving to the Twin Cities to attend college. After taking preparatory classes at Hamline University he transferred to the University of Minnesota where he graduated in 1897 with a degree in chemistry.

Kunze worked as a teacher and school administrator for almost a decade holding positions in Lake City, Red Wing, Hastings and Saint Paul. In 1902 he married Galena Muedeking of Owatonna, Minnesota with whom he had three children. Around 1910 he turned to a career in business and found work with a heating and ventilating company in Minneapolis. In 1910 he was elected to the Minnesota House of Representatives for a single term. In 1922 he became a vice president with the Exchange State Bank (which later merged with the Marquette Trust Company).

Kunze was elected Mayor of Minneapolis in 1928, serving one term.

Kunze is believed to be one of the first Minnesotans to have ever appeared on television. WDGY radio (today known as KFAN) had started an experimental mechanical television system using the call sign W9XAT. On September 29, 1930 at the Northwest Radio and Electrical Show a short demonstration was arranged broadcasting a shot of Kunze shaking hands with WDGY personality Clellan Card. This was the first demonstration of broadcast television in Minnesota.

Kunze died on February 14, 1962.
