= Albert H. Blanding =

United States Army general

Albert Hazen Blanding
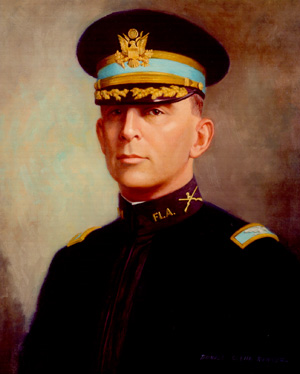
- Blanding as commander of 2nd Florida Infantry, 1916
- Born: November 9, 1876; Lyons, Iowa, U.S.
- Died: December 26, 1970 (aged 94); Bartow, Florida, U.S.
- Burial place: Evergreen Cemetery, Gainesville, Florida
- Military career
- Allegiance: United States
- Branch: United States Army
- Service years: 1895–1940
- Rank: Major General (federal); Lieutenant General (state)
- Service number: 0-222742
- Commands: 2nd Florida Infantry Regiment; 53rd Infantry Brigade; 31st Infantry Division; National Guard Bureau
- Conflicts: Pancho Villa Expedition; World War I World War II
- Awards: Army Distinguished Service Medal

Albert Hazen Blanding (November 9, 1876 – December 26, 1970) was a United States Army officer. Among the most distinguished military figures in Florida's history, he was a recipient of the Distinguished Service Medal.

== Early life ==
Blanding was born in Lyons, Iowa, but his family moved to Florida when he was two years old. Blanding attended East Florida Seminary, now known as the University of Florida, in Gainesville, graduating in 1894. He was commissioned a captain in the Florida National Guard in 1899. At the time, he was a phosphate company executive. he advanced through the ranks in a variety of staff and command positions, receiving promotion to major in 1906 and lieutenant colonel in 1908.

== Pancho Villa Expedition ==
Blanding was promoted to the rank of colonel in 1909 and ran a turpentine, sawmill, and lumber business from 1910 to 1914 while active on the National Guard roster. In the Pancho Villa Expedition, Blanding commanded the Second Florida Infantry.

== World War I ==
On August 5, 1917, Blanding was called up to serve in World War I, where he commanded the 53rd Brigade, part of Major General John F. O'Ryan's 27th Division, O'Ryan's roughnecks as it was often called, as a brigadier general.

In France, he commanded the 185th Infantry Brigade, which included the 370th Infantry Regiment from Illinois.

After hostilities ceased, he was awarded the Army Distinguished Service Medal, the citation for which states the following:

The President of the United States of America, authorized by Act of Congress, July 9, 1918, takes pleasure in presenting the Army Distinguished Service Medal to Brigadier General Albert Hazen Blanding, United States Army, for exceptionally meritorious and distinguished services to the Government of the United States, in a duty of great responsibility during World War I, while serving as Commanding General of the 53d Infantry Brigade of the 27th Division throughout the entire period of active operations.

He was discharged from the Army on March 1, 1919, after which he resumed his service to the Florida National Guard.

== Post World War I ==
Blanding was the production manager of the Florida Citrus Exchange, and served a term as head of Florida's American Legion. and was a member of the Florida Board of Control from 1922 to 1936.

In 1924, he was promoted to major general in the National Guard and commander of the 31st Infantry Division.

== National Guard Bureau ==
From 1936 to 1940, Blanding was Chief of the National Guard Bureau by appointment of President Franklin D. Roosevelt.

At his 1940 retirement, Blanding received a state promotion to lieutenant general in recognition of his service and accomplishments.

== World War II ==
During World War II, Blanding was the Military Advisor to Florida's Governor. After the war, he was an advocate for the establishment of the Everglades National Park.

== Philanthropic and civic activities ==
Blanding was a member of the Elks, the Kiwanias, and a Mason.

== Awards ==
- Army Distinguished Service Medal
- Florida Active Service Medal
- Florida Cross

== Death and burial ==
Blanding died December 26, 1970. He was buried at Evergreen Cemetery in Gainesville, Florida.

== Legacy ==
In 1939, he was honored by the establishment of a military station, Camp Blanding. A major Army training installation for World War II, it was later designated as the primary military reservation and training site for the Florida National Guard.

The University of Florida awarded him Doctor of Laws in May 1942. During World War II he served on the Florida Board of the Selective Service System and helped found Everglades National Park.

Blanding was designated a Great Floridian by the Florida Department of State in the Great Floridians 2000 Program. A plaque attesting to the honor is located at Bartow City Hall.

== Photos ==
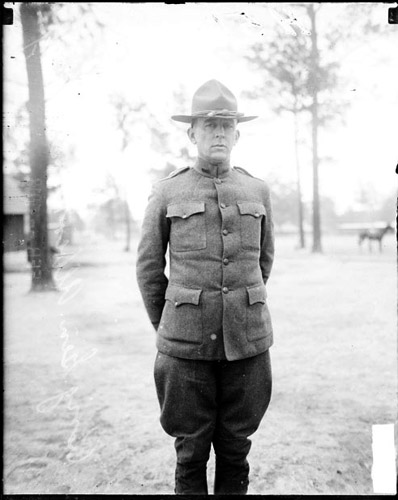
Blanding, Camp Logan in Houston, Texas, 1918

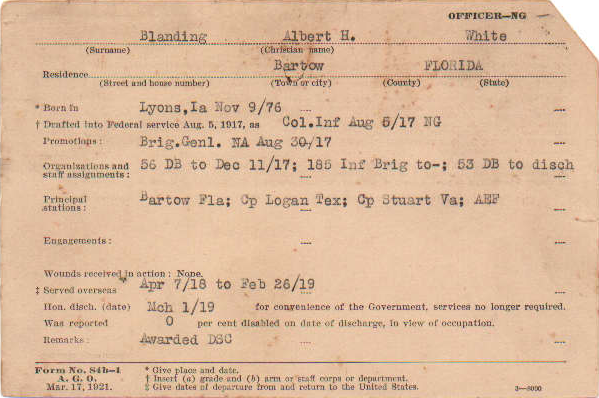
Blanding's service record, incorrectly naming WWI award as Distinguished Service Cross. Blanding received Distinguished Service Medal.

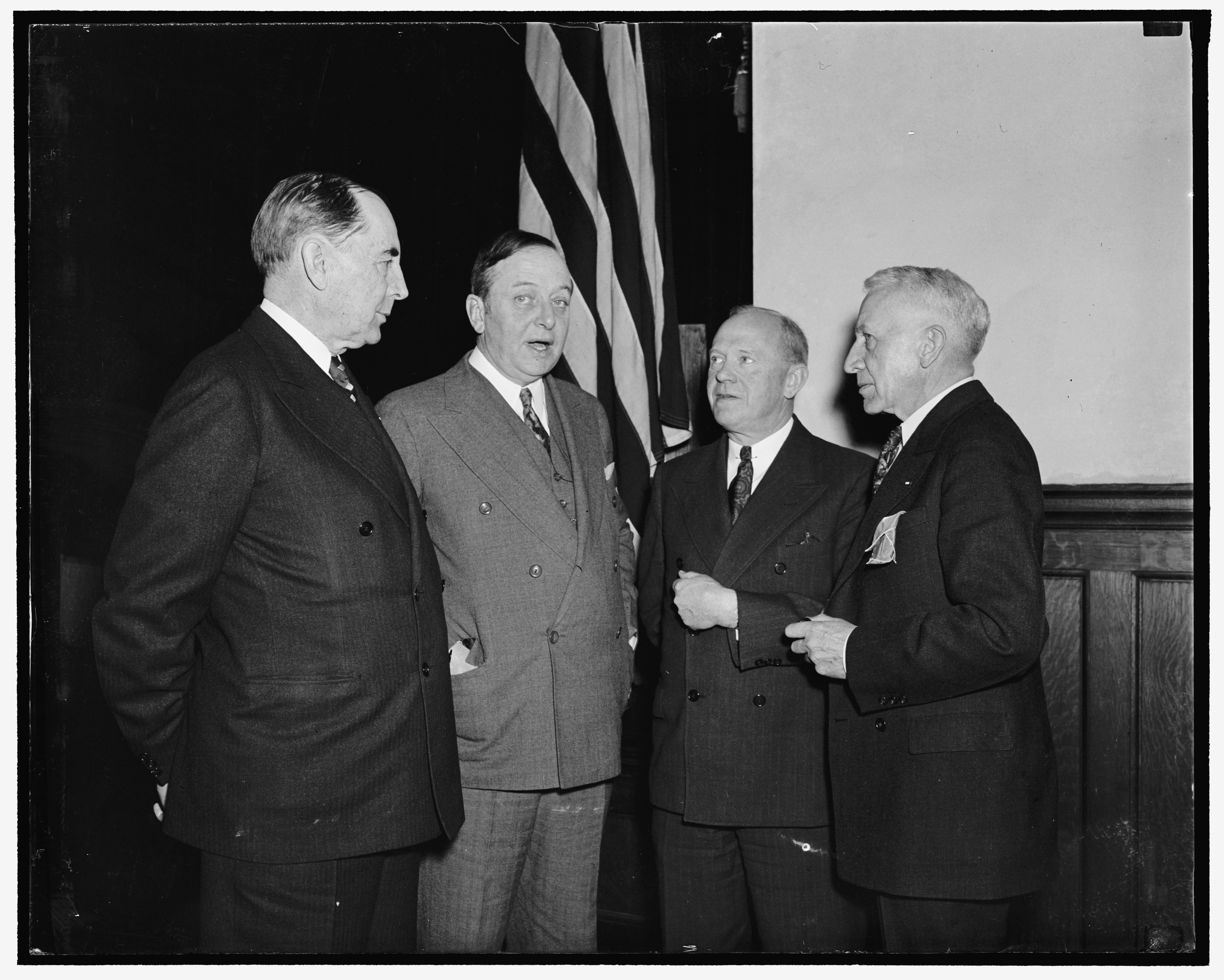
Blanding (left) in 1938

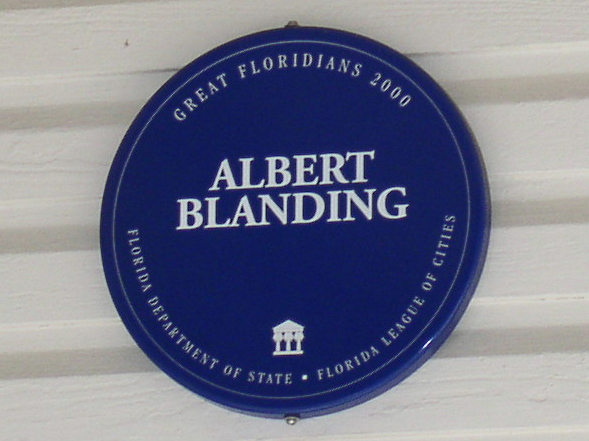
Blanding's Great Floridian Marker

== Bibliography ==
- Davis, Henry Blaine Jr. (1998). Generals in Khaki. Pentland Press, Inc. ISBN 1571970886. OCLC 40298151.
- Borrowed Soldiers: Americans Under British Command, 1918. 2008. University of Oklahoma Press. ISBN 9780806139197 OCLC 171287665

Military offices
Preceded by Col. John F. Williams (acting)	Chief of the National Guard Bureau; 1936 – 1940	Succeeded by MG John F. Williams
