= 1936 Minnesota Attorney General election =

- November 3, 1936
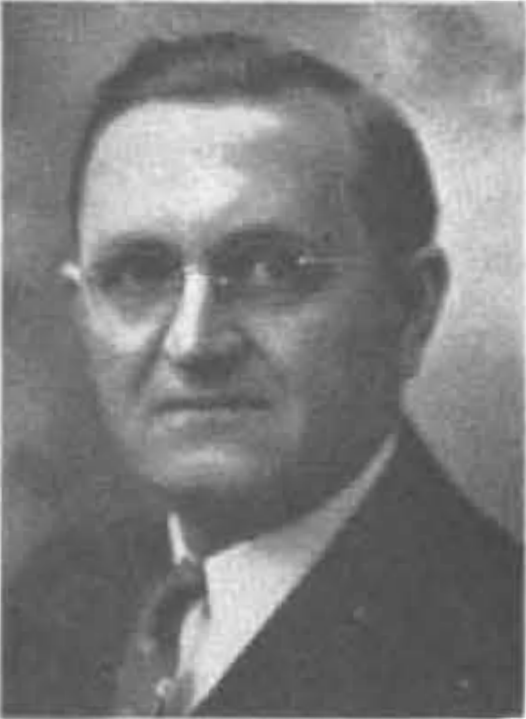

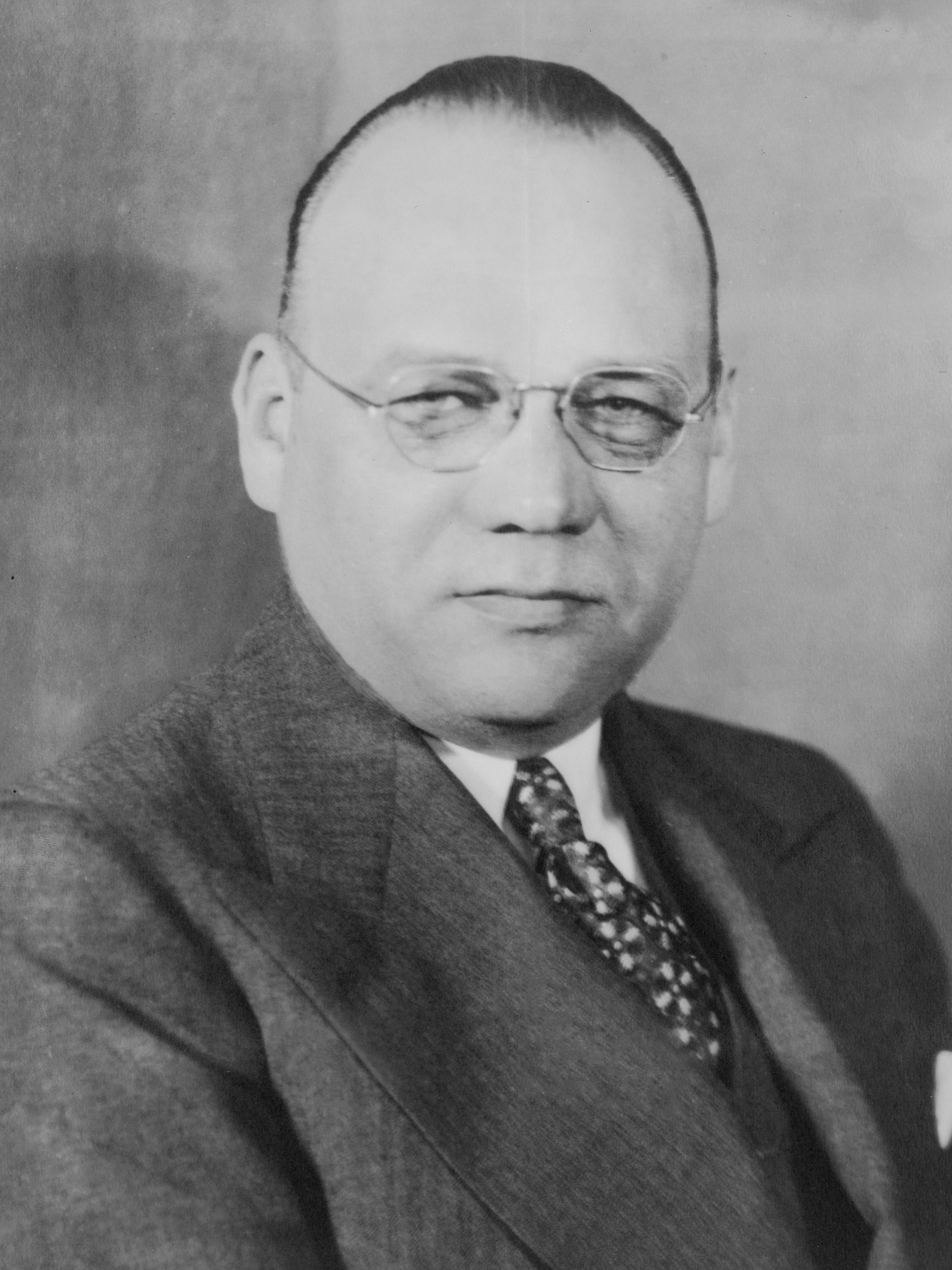

Nominee	Harry H. Peterson	Oscar Youngdahl	Thomas F. Gallagher
Party	Farmer–Labor	Republican	Democratic
Popular vote	530,815	382,846	156,018
Percentage	49.62%	35.79%	14.59%
- County results Peterson: 30–40% 40–50% 50–60% 60–70% 70–80% Youngdahl: 30–40% 40–50% 50–60%
Attorney General before election
Harry H. Peterson
Farmer–Labor
Elected Attorney General
Harry H. Peterson
Farmer–Labor

The 1936 Minnesota Attorney General election was held on November 3, 1936, in order to elect the attorney general of Minnesota. Farmer–Labor nominee and incumbent attorney general Harry H. Peterson defeated Republican nominee Oscar Youngdahl and Democratic nominee Thomas F. Gallagher.

== General election ==
On election day, November 3, 1936, Farmer–Labor nominee Harry H. Peterson won re-election by a margin of 147,969 votes against his foremost opponent Republican nominee Oscar Youngdahl, thereby retaining Farmer–Labor control over the office of attorney general. Peterson was sworn in for his third term on January 4, 1937.

=== Results ===
Minnesota Attorney General election, 1936
Party	Candidate	Votes	%
Farmer–Labor	Harry H. Peterson (incumbent)	530,815	49.62
Republican	Oscar Youngdahl	382,846	35.79
Democratic	Thomas F. Gallagher	156,018	14.59
Total votes		1,069,679	100.00
Farmer–Labor hold			
