= Ira H. Latimer =

Ira Helser Latimer (1906–1985) was an educator, missionary, activist, and lawyer who advocated for civil rights and equal accommodation for African Americans in Chicago. Minneapolis mayor Thomas Erwin Latimer was his father.

== Life ==
He was born in Columbus, Ohio. He was raised as Ira Jenkins until his father's paternity was revealed when Ira was working as a radio broadcaster. He married and had a son and daughter.

== Career ==
He was denied admittance to the Illinois Bar. He wrote to W. E. B. Du Bois about his difficulties with LeMoyne College in Memphis, Tennessee. He wrote a thesis on African American politics at Ohio State University.

As executive director of the Chicago Civil Liberties Commission, he was involved in protests over the banning of Maude Hutchins' book A Diary of Love in Chicago.
