= Tioga, Illinois =

- Unincorporated community
- Location within Illinois Location within the United States
- Coordinates: 40°12′40″N 91°20′50″W
- Country: United States
- State: Illinois
- County: Hancock County
- Township: Walker Township
- Elevation: 745 ft (227 m)
- ZIP code: 62351
- GNIS feature ID: 0419740

Tioga is an unincorporated community in Walker Township, Hancock County, Illinois, United States.
