= A. G. Bainbridge =

American politician (1885–1936)

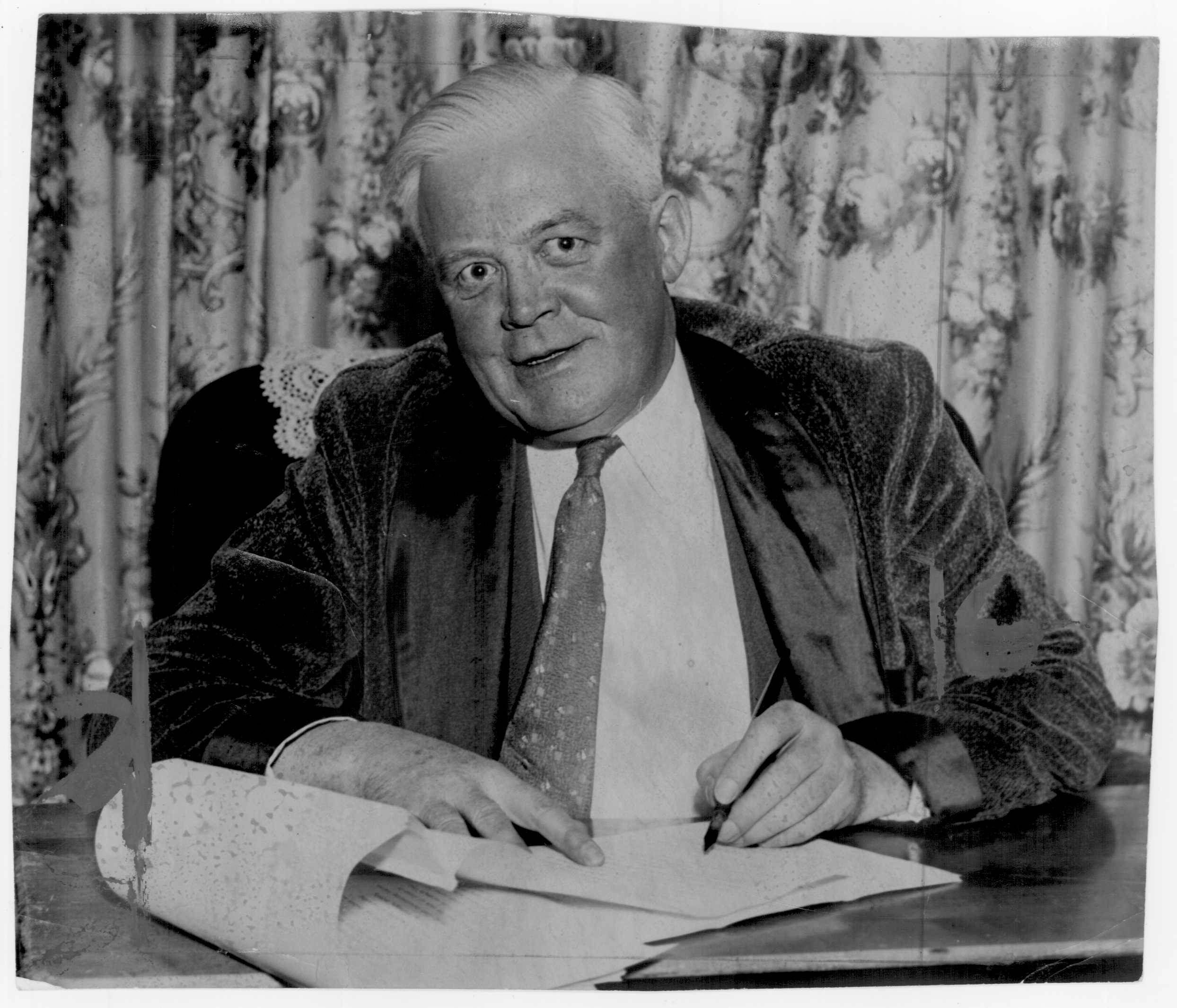
- Alexander Gilbert ("Buzz") Bainbridge, 1930s

31st Mayor of Minneapolis
- In office 1933–1935
- Preceded by: William A. Anderson
- Succeeded by: Thomas E. Latimer

Personal details
- Born: September 4, 1885 Pittsburgh, Pennsylvania, U.S.
- Died: March 14, 1936 (aged 50) Minneapolis, Minnesota, U.S.
- Party: Republican
- Profession: theater manager

Alexander Gilbert "Buzz" Bainbridge (September 4, 1885 – March 14, 1936) was a theater manager who also served as the 31st mayor of Minneapolis.

== Life and career ==
Bainbridge was born in Pittsburgh, Pennsylvania in 1885. At the age of 17 he began working as a bill poster for the Sells-Forepaugh Brothers Circus. He later advanced to working as a press agent for the Barnum & Bailey Circus. He also worked with theaters in Chicago during summers and with The 101 Ranch Wild West Show during the winter. He later relocated to Minneapolis and, from the 1920s through the 1930s, he managed the Shubert Theater. He also founded and managed a company of actors called the Bainbridge Players which became one of the city's leading theater ensembles.

In 1933, Bainbridge surprised many by challenging incumbent mayor William A. Anderson. Playing on his theatrical roots, he announced his candidacy on Friday the 13th while standing under a ladder with an open umbrella and his fingers crossed. Campaigning on ideas like creating government projects to fight unemployment and attracting more tourists and businesses to the city, Bainbridge defeated Anderson in an upset.

During Bainbridge's term in office, tensions between the city's labor unions and the anti-union Citizen's Alliance led to a general strike. Bainbridge sided with the Citizen's Alliance and, through his police chief Michael Johannes, authorized the police to try breaking up the strike. In the ensuing clash, two union picketers were killed and more than 60 were injured by police. Bainbridge faced calls for his resignation due to the violent response. After the strike was resolved and the union's demands were met, he lashed out at the unions and accused them of being communists.

Bainbridge was defeated by Thomas E. Latimer in his 1935 re-election bid and died one year later.
