= Cowles Center for Dance and the Performing Arts =

Venue in Minneapolis, Minnesota

- Interactive map of the Cowles Center for Dance and the Performing Arts area
- Sam S. Shubert Theatre
- U.S. National Register of Historic Places
- Minneapolis Landmark
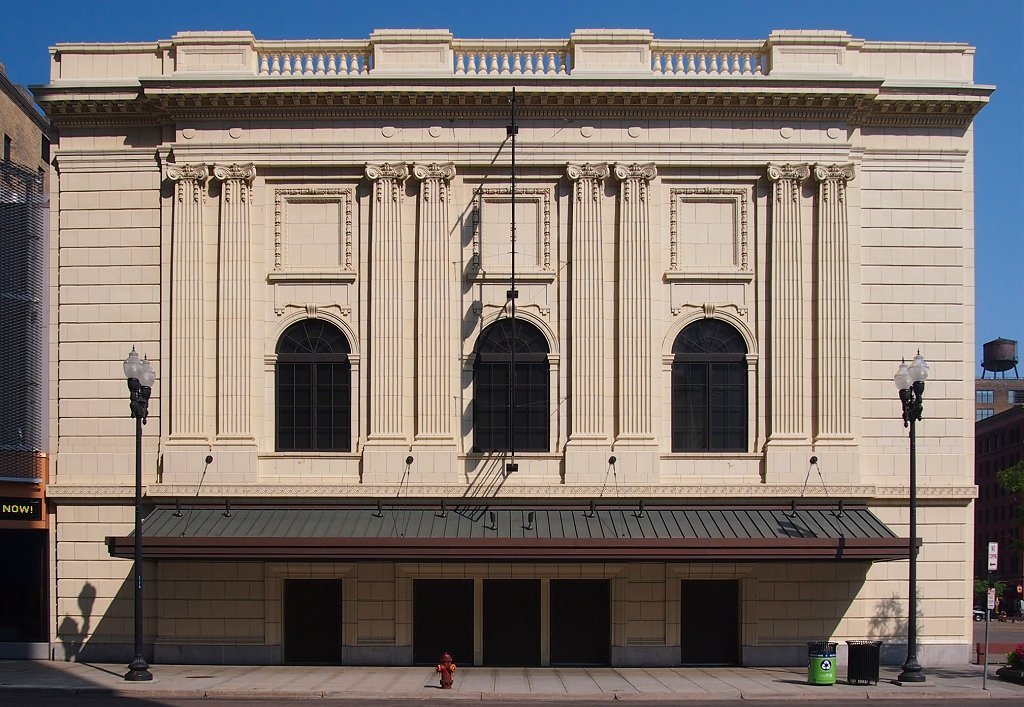
- The Goodale Theater of the Cowles Center for Dance and the Performing Arts

- Location within Minnesota Location within the United States
- Location: 528 Hennepin Avenue; Minneapolis, Minnesota
- Coordinates: 44°58′47″N 93°16′23″W
- Built: 1910
- Architect: Swasey, William Albert; Robinson, J.L. Co., et al.
- Architectural style: Beaux Arts
- NRHP reference No.: 95001230

Significant dates
- Added to NRHP: October 31, 1995
- Designated MPLSL: 1990

The Cowles Center for Dance and the Performing Arts (formerly the Minnesota Shubert Performing Arts and Education Center) is a performing arts center and flagship for dance in downtown Minneapolis, Minnesota, United States. The Cowles Center was developed as an incubation project by Artspace Projects, Inc and includes the refurbished 500-seat Goodale Theater (formerly the Sam S. Shubert Theater); the Hennepin Center for the Arts, home to 20 leading dance and performing arts organizations; a state-of-the-art education studio housing a distance learning program; and an atrium connecting the buildings. The Cowles Center is a catalyst for the creation, presentation and education of dance in the Twin Cities.

The Cowles Center closed the Goodale Theater in March 2024 and ceased all operations in May 2024 due to financial challenges. The abrupt closure ended the performance season two months early, cancelling planned shows.

Both the Goodale Theater and the Hennepin Center for the Arts (formerly the Minneapolis Masonic Temple) are on the National Register of Historic Places.

The distance learning program began teaching students in 2002. Using IP videoconferencing technologies, it brings artists into classrooms throughout Minnesota, nationally and internationally, creating two-way interactive, real-time teaching environments.

== Original Samuel S. Shubert Theater ==
The Shubert Theatrical Company, run by brothers Levi, Samuel, and Jacob, entered the New York theater scene in 1900 and had become the largest theater owning and producing organization in America by 1920.

When Samuel Shubert died in a train wreck in 1905, his brothers memorialized him by naming a few of their new theaters after him. Two of these new theaters opened on the same day in 1910: Saint Paul’s Shubert Theater, which became the Fitzgerald Theater in 1994, and The Samuel S. Shubert Theater in Minneapolis, which reopened as The Cowles Center for Dance and the Performing Arts in September 2011, after a long and dramatic history.

The Samuel S. Shubert Theater was designed by William Albert Swasey (1864–1940). For its time it was a mid-sized house, consisting of 1,500 seats with two shallow balconies. The front of the building had a Classical Revival façade featuring four pairs of bas-relief columns framing three arched windows at the second-story level. As with many of Swasey’s other buildings, the decorative elements of the façade were made of glazed terra cotta.

The opening show at Minneapolis’ new Samuel S. Shubert Theatre was The White Sister starring Viola Allen. Ticket prices ranged from $2.50 to 50 cents.

Alexander G. “Buzz” Bainbridge, a former press agent for Buffalo Bill's Wild West Show and general manager for a Chicago producer of touring shows, became the Shubert's manager in 1910, at the age of 25.

The Shubert had been conceived as a venue for touring Broadway shows, but those tours stopped in the summer, leaving the theater empty, so, the Shuberts tasked Bainbridge with creating a resident acting ensemble. The Bainbridge Players became a popular year-round attraction. Several of its actors, such as Victory Jory, Gladys George, and Johnny Dilson, went on to successful film careers.

In 1915, The Shubert began to play movies, accompanied by a 40-piece pit orchestra. In 1918 the flu epidemic closed all Minneapolis theaters. The Shubert remodeled; new lights were installed, the orchestra pit was expanded, and the theater was repainted.

Throughout the 1920s the prevalence and popularity of films began to push out live theater. While the Shubert held on until 1933, it could not withstand the changing of the tides. Bainbridge disbanded his company, and became mayor of Minneapolis from 1933 to 1935.

== The Alvin ==
The Shubert came back to life as “The Alvin” in 1935, named after its new owner William Alvin Steffes. Steffes added an Art Deco marquee and split the stage time between movies and touring Broadway shows until December 1940, when the theater went under for two months before reincarnating as a burlesque theater.

Despite a fire on July 6, 1941, which necessitated a five-month-long renovation, The Alvin theater kept its doors open as a burlesque theater until 1953. Some of the best known strip-tease artists of the day including Tempest Storm, Candy Barr, and Gypsy Rose Lee performed there. A typical burlesque show offered not only titillation, but entertainment by jugglers, comedians, and variety acts. One of the most noteworthy of these performers was Dudley Riggs, a comedian juggler who went on to found Brave New Workshop, now housed only a few blocks from The Cowles Center.

In November 1953, the Alvin underwent yet another change when the Reverend Russell H. Olson turned the building into the Minneapolis Evangelistic Auditorium. The church closed only three years later.

== The Academy ==
The Shubert came back in 1957 when Ted Mann bought it, converted it into a movie theater, and renamed it The Academy. On July 12, 1957, The Academy hosted the Minneapolis premiere of Minnesota native Michael Todd's Around the World in Eighty Days. Todd, who used to be a candy vendor in the old Shubert Theater, attended the opening with his wife, Elizabeth Taylor.

The Academy began to struggle as suburban multiplexes replaced single-screen houses, and 1983 brought yet another closing of the theater's doors.

== Closed doors and new projects ==
In 1987, 25% of reported crimes in downtown Minneapolis were committed on Block E, where the Shubert was located. In an effort to combat the increasing crime, the Minneapolis City Council approved guidelines for a redevelopment project. However, the project brought The Shubert under threat of the wrecking ball.

Block E was razed in 1988 and 1989 except for the Shubert. In 1990, the Heritage Preservation Commission convinced city officials not to demolish the Shubert unless it proved prohibitively expensive to develop Block E with the theater in place. Save Our Shubert wrote letters to editors and held candlelight vigils outside the theater. The Shubert was added to the National Register of Historic places in 1996, leaving Brookfield Development to find a way to incorporate the Shubert into their Block E proposal.

Artspace Vice President Tom Nordyke had the idea to move the Shubert out of the way, solving the issue in a way that benefited preservationists, developers, and the arts community. Bakke Kopp Ballou and McFarlin Inc of Minneapolis concluded that the option of moving a 6-million-pound building a few blocks was, in fact, feasible.

It took twelve days to move the theater from Block E to its new Hennepin Avenue location in February 1999. At 5.8 million pounds, it was the heaviest building ever moved on rubber tires, and holds a Guinness World Record for this accomplishment.

The Shubert was too large to be moved on city streets, but the only things between it and its new home were parking lots. Renovation of the building at its new location created The Cowles Center for the Performing Arts.

== Goodale Theater ==
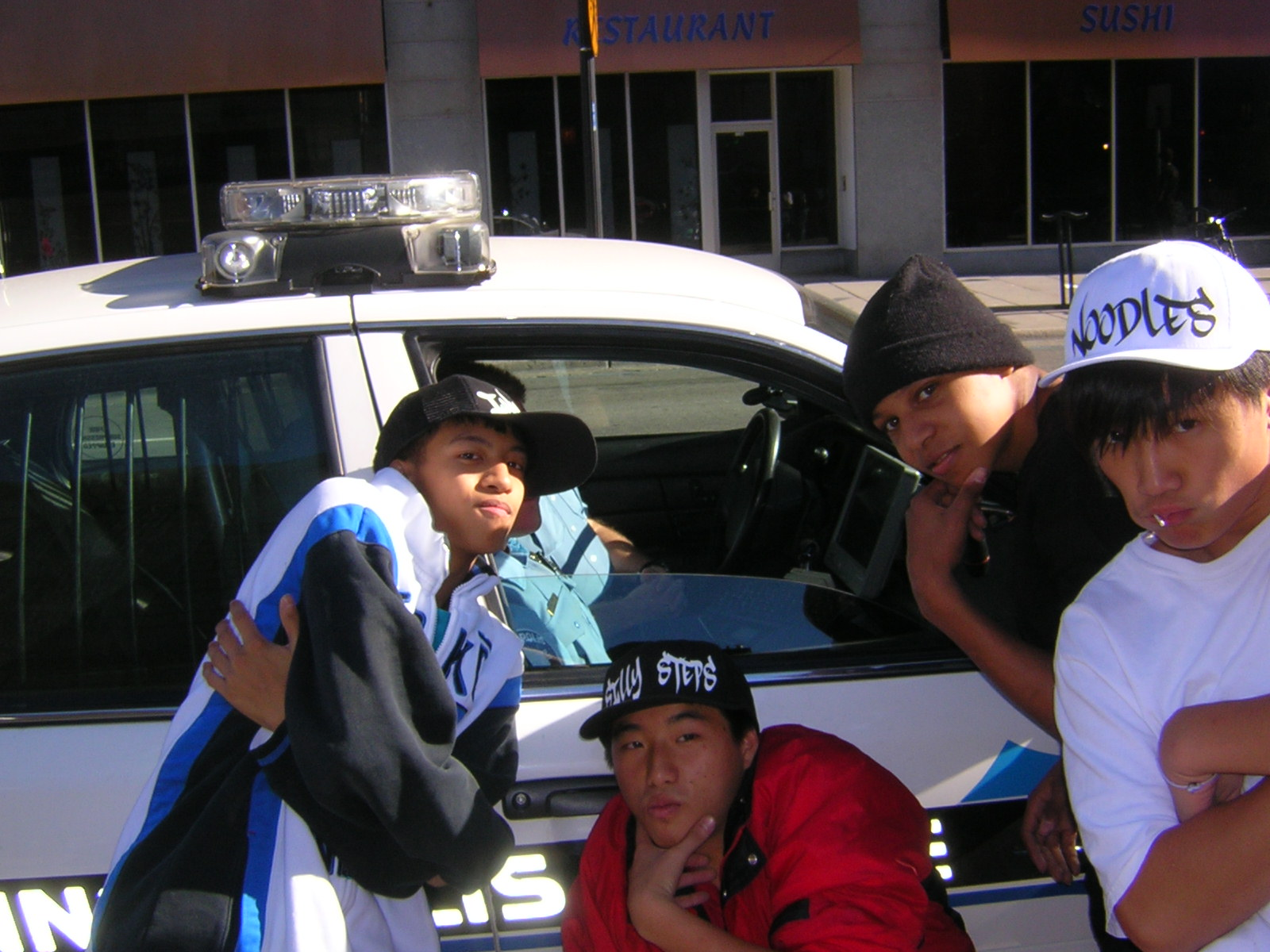
Watching Groundbreaker Battle 2008 at Minnesota Shubert's month-long Hip-Hop Dance: From the Street to the State

The refurbished Goodale Theater with 505 seats (216 orchestra level, 289 Grand Tier level) offer guests intimate, unobstructed views of the entire stage with no seat further than 65 feet from center stage. Each row of seats arcs semi-circularly to face center stage.

Ornate columns of cherrywood and historic architectural details frame the proscenium arch. Floors throughout the backstage area are covered with a special linoleum that allows ballet performers to walk from dressing rooms to the stage without removing their toe shoes. The spacious backstage spaces and dressing rooms allow maximum flexible space to support a wide variety of companies and performance needs. The orchestra pit accommodates up to 42 musicians and adds the dimension of live orchestral music. The orchestra pit can also be adjusted to add two additional rows of seating in the house. The stage is large enough to provide choreographers with ample space in the wings to perform large-scale productions. The stage also includes a full-size stage house with 52 riggings that can support extensive and elaborate set designs.

== U.S. Bank Atrium ==
The main entrance to The Cowles Center houses the box office and information desk, concession space, donor wall, and entrances to the Goodale Theater and The Hennepin Center for the Arts.

A Labanotation wall art piece inspired by Rites of Spring hangs above the concession area. Developed by dance artist and theorist Rudolf Laban (1878–1958), Labanotation is a way of writing down dance which is analogous to the way music notation is a way of writing down music. Labanotation uses symbols to represent points on a dancer's body, the direction of the dancer's movements, the tempo, and the dynamics.

== Target Education Studio ==
The studio was designed specifically for dance with a sprung maple floor, studio lighting and a wall of mirrors. It houses the center's long distance learning program. Using video conferencing technology, the center brings artists into classrooms to create two-way, interactive, real-time teaching environments. Thanks to generous funding, the center is also able to provide free sessions to Minnesota schools.

== Inaugural season ==
The Cowles Center inaugural season spanned the fall of 2011 and the spring of 2012 and brought a variety of Minnesota dance companies to the same venue. Dance companies which performed in the 2011–12 season included:

- Ragamala Dance
- Minnesota Dance Theatre
- Beyond Ballroom Dance Company
- Black Label Movement
- Zorongo Flamenco
- Native Pride Dancers
- James Sewell Ballet
- Matthew Janczewski's Arena Dance
- Stuart Pimsler Dance and Theater
- Katha Dance Theater
- Shapiro and Smith Dance Company
- Zenon Dance Company
- Breaking Boundaries Dance Company
- Tu Dance

The inaugural season also included Cantus, and a performance by New York-based dancers Kegwin + Company.
