= George E. Leach =

American politician (1876–1955)

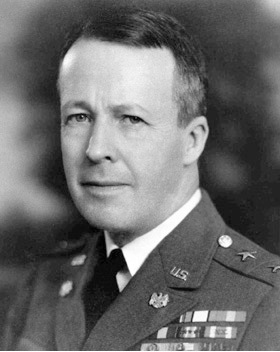
- Leach as Militia Bureau Chief
- Born: July 14, 1876; Cedar Rapids, Iowa, U.S.
- Died: July 17, 1955 (aged 79); Los Angeles, California, U.S.
- Burial place: Fort Snelling National Cemetery
- Military career
- Allegiance: United States
- Branch: United States Army
- Service years: 1905–1941
- Rank: Major General
- Commands: 151st Field Artillery Regiment; 56th Field Artillery Brigade; National Guard Bureau; 34th Infantry Division
- Conflicts: Pancho Villa Expedition; World War I World War II
- Awards: Distinguished Service Cross; Army Distinguished Service Medal; Purple Heart
- Other work: Mayor of Minneapolis; Insurance executive Owner, vending business

28th and 33rd Mayor of Minneapolis
- In office July 5, 1937 – July 6, 1941
- Preceded by: Thomas E. Latimer
- Succeeded by: Marvin L. Kline
- In office July 4, 1921 – July 7, 1929
- Preceded by: J. E. Meyers
- Succeeded by: William F. Kunze

Personal details
- Party: Republican

George Emerson Leach (July 14, 1876 – July 17, 1955) was an American politician who served as a major general in the United States Army and two-time Republican Mayor of Minneapolis.

== Early life ==
George Emerson Leach was born in Cedar Rapids, Iowa on July 14, 1876, and was raised in Minneapolis. He attended Central High School in Minneapolis. After graduating from the University of Minnesota Law School in 1897, he began a career in insurance.

== Career ==
=== Military ===
In April 1905, he was commissioned as a Second lieutenant of Field Artillery in the Minnesota National Guard. Leach advanced through the ranks of the military in command and staff assignments. He graduated from the United States Army Command and General Staff College in 1916. In 1916–7, he saw active duty on the United States–Mexico border during the Pancho Villa Expedition; first as a Major, and later as Colonel and Commander of the 151st Artillery Regiment.

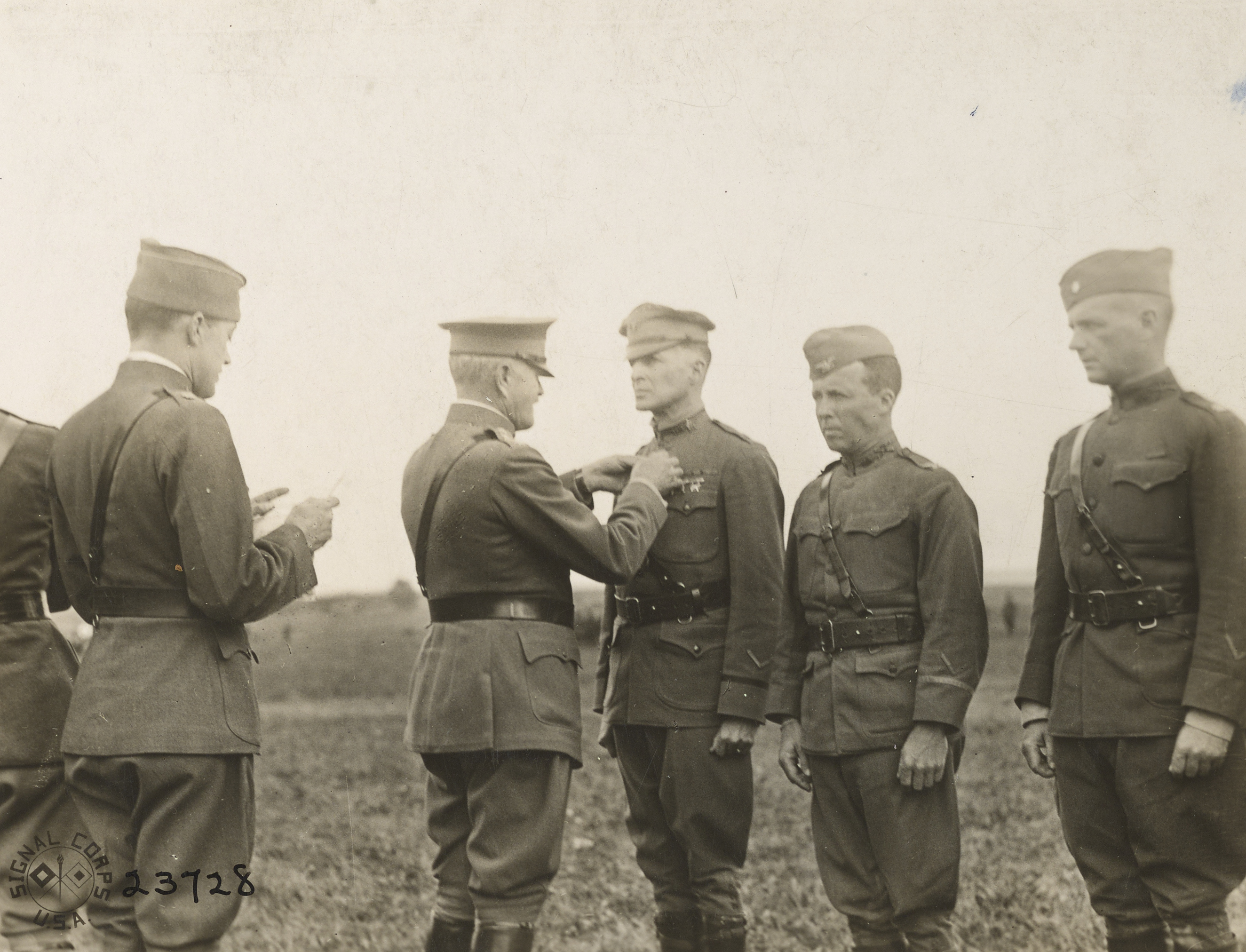
General John J. Pershing decorates Brigadier General Douglas MacArthur (third from left) with the Distinguished Service Cross in late 1918. Major General Charles T. Menoher (furthest left) reads out the citation while Colonel George E. Leach (fourth from left) and Lieutenant Colonel William J. Donovan await their decorations.

During World War I, Leach commanded the 151st Field Artillery Regiment, a unit of the 42nd Infantry Division. He took part in battles at Champagne-Marne, Aisne-Marne, St. Mihiel, and Meuse-Argonne. Leach remained in command of the 151st Field Artillery until November 1921, after which he returned to the insurance business as manager of the St. Paul Fire & Marine Insurance Company.

In 1923, Leach was promoted to brigadier general as commander of Minnesota's 59th Field Artillery Brigade. In 1931, he was appointed Chief of the National Guard Bureau and was promoted to Major General. He served in this position until 1935, after which he returned to command of the 59th Field Artillery Brigade, reverting to his permanent rank of Brigadier General. Later in 1935, he was forced to bail out of a burning US Army airplane during a flight from Washington to California. He wandered through Arizona wastelands until he found someone to lead him to safety. As a result, he became the highest ranking official at the time to become a member of the Caterpillar Club, an informal organization of aviators whose lives have been saved by an emergency parachute jump. In 1937, he was elected President of the National Guard Association of the United States.

From 1940 until his retirement in 1941, Leach was commander of the 34th Infantry Division, again receiving promotion to Major General. Under his command the division was activated and began its initial preparations and training for entry into World War II.

After the war, Leach operated a vending machine company, George E. Leach, Inc., and was Chairman of the National Automatic Merchandising Association.

=== Political ===
In June 1921, Leach was elected Mayor of Minneapolis. He stood for election as a conservative, and was re-elected in 1923. During his second term, Leach's opponents accused him of being a communist because he opposed private ownership of a hydroelectric dam on the Mississippi River.

At the same time, the Ku Klux Klan (KKK) was growing in Minnesota within the ranks of several fraternal orders, primarily the Masons and Shriners. Leach was a member of several such organizations, and the Klan initially regarded him as a de facto ally but later considered him an adversary because he had appointed a Catholic as his secretary and had dined with the Knights of Columbus. The Klan also disliked Leach because he prevented police officers from joining the Klan and because he launched an investigation into Klan activity at the University of Minnesota. The KKK fielded its Exalted Cyclops, Roy Miner, as a mayoral candidate against Leach in 1923. Miner campaigned on elimination of illegal gambling and vice, which he said Leach abetted. The KKK found a woman in a local jail who said she had had an affair with Leach, and publicized this in an effort to enmesh Leach in a scandal. A grand jury decided the story of the affair was criminally libelous. The case went to trial; Floyd B. Olson handled the prosecution against five KKK leaders. The witness said she had lied about Leach, who denied both the affair and the charges of protecting vice and gambling. The all-Protestant jury found the defendants guilty and sentenced them to prison. Leach won a landslide re-election against the KKK's stand-in for Miner, Senator William A. Campbell.

In 1926, Leach was an unsuccessful candidate for the Republican nomination for Governor. He was re-elected mayor in 1927, but was defeated for re-election in 1929. In 1937, he was again elected mayor. He was an unsuccessful candidate for the Republican nomination for Governor of Minnesota in 1938. He was re-elected mayor in 1939, and served until 1941.

== Amateur sports affiliation ==
Leach was an avid skier. In 1924 he managed the U.S. Olympic Ski Team, and he was the National Ski Association's representative to the 1924 convention which led to the creation of the International Ski Federation.

== Death ==
Leach died in Los Angeles, California on July 17, 1955. He was buried at Fort Snelling National Cemetery, Section D.S., Site 65-N.

== Awards and legacy ==
Leach's awards included the Distinguished Service Cross, Distinguished Service Medal and Purple Heart in addition to other service and achievement awards. The George E. Leach Range and Leach Avenue at Camp Ripley, a Minnesota National Guard training facility, are named for him.

Leach was posthumously named to the U.S. Ski and Snowboard Hall of Fame.

== Ribbon bar ==

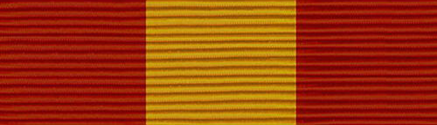

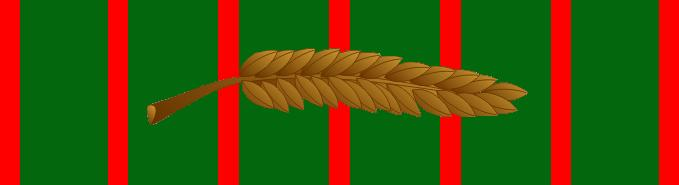

| 1st Row | Distinguished Service Cross | | Army Distinguished Service Medal | |
| 2nd Row | Purple Heart | Mexican Border Service Medal | World War I Victory Medal w/ three battle clasps | Army of Occupation of Germany Medal |
| 3rd Row | American Defense Service Medal | American Campaign Medal | World War II Victory Medal | Minnesota Medal for Merit |
| 4th Row | Officer of the Legion of Honour | French Croix de guerre 1914–1918 with Palm and Star | Commander of the Order of the Crown of Italy | Knight 1st Class of the Norwegian Order of St. Olav |

Political offices
| Preceded by J. E. Meyers | Mayor of Minneapolis; 1921–1929 | Succeeded by William F. Kunze |
| Preceded by Thomas E. Latimer | Mayor of Minneapolis; 1937–1941 | Succeeded by Marvin L. Kline |
Military offices
| Preceded by William G. Everson | Chief of the National Guard Bureau; 1931–1935 | Succeeded by Herold J. Weiler (acting) |
