= Echo Park Dam =

Unbuilt dam in northwestern Colorado, United States

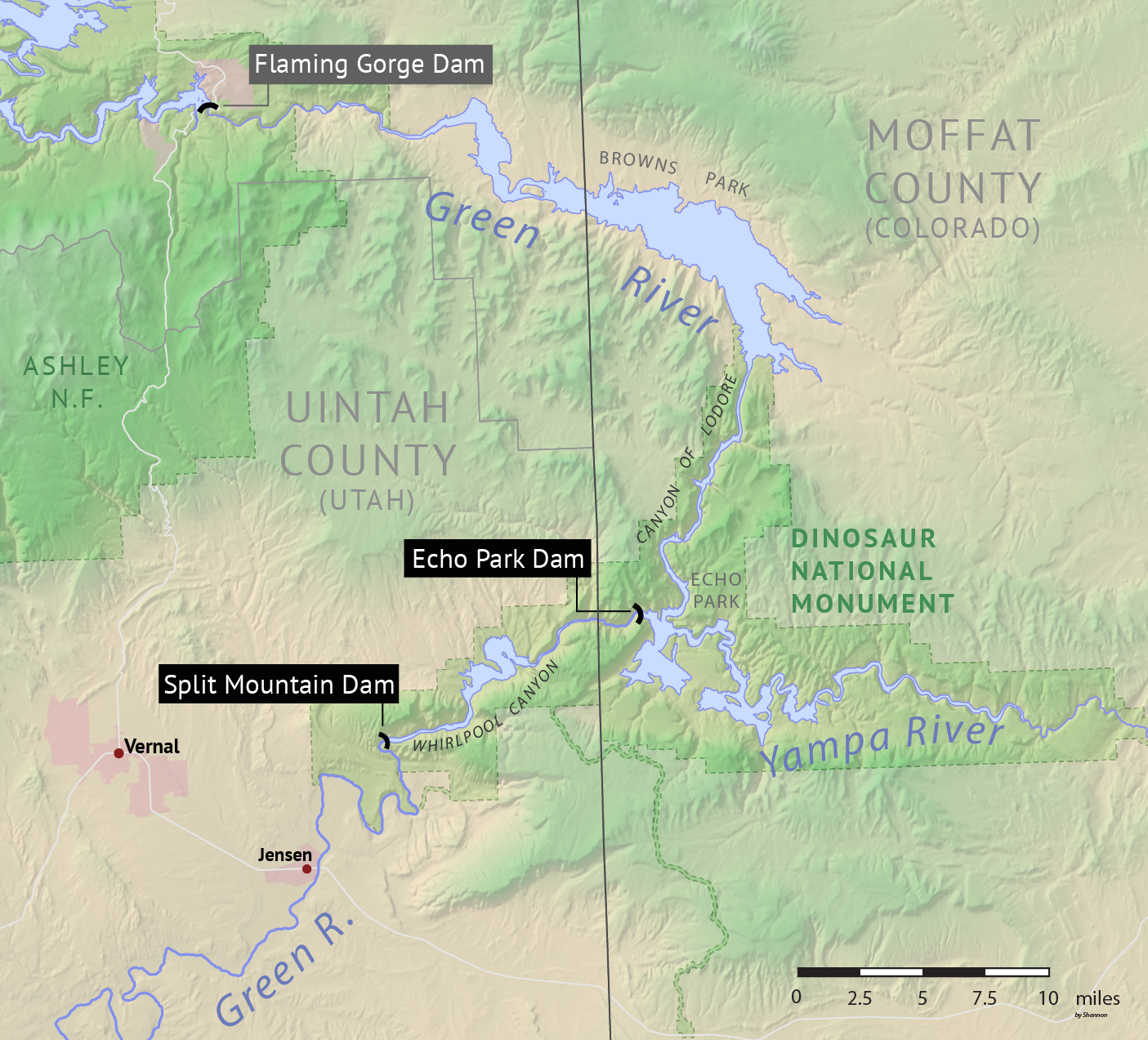
- Locations of the proposed dams and reservoirs

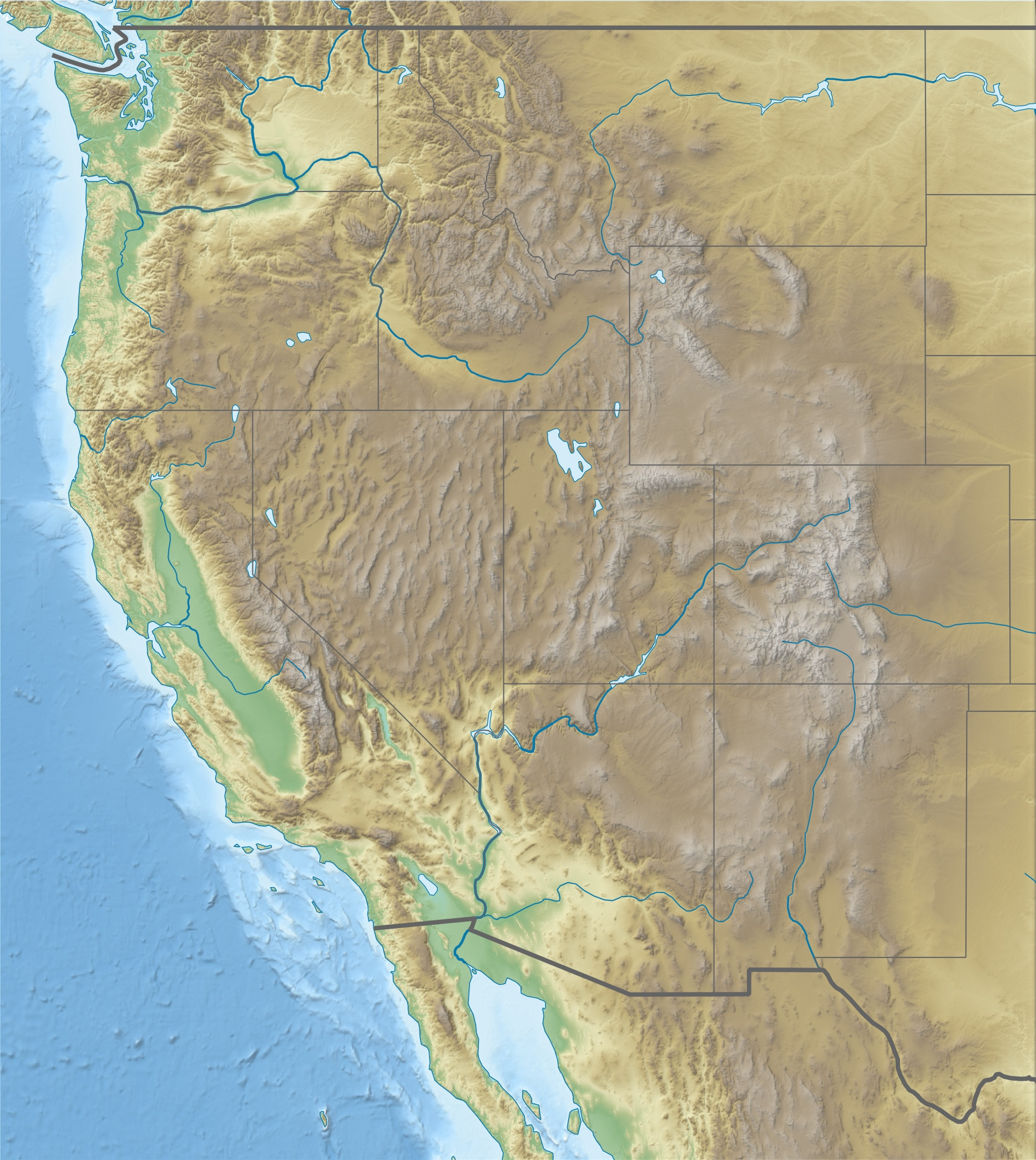
- Location of the proposed Echo Park Dam
- Country: United States
- Location: Northwestern Colorado
- Coordinates: 40°32′43.45″N 109°00′30.35″W
- Status: Unbuilt
- Owner: United States Bureau of Reclamation

Dam and spillways
- Type of dam: Concrete thick arch
- Impounds: Green River
- Height: 529 ft (161 m)

Reservoir
- Total capacity: 6,400,000 acre-feet (7.9 km^{3})
- Normal elevation: 5,500 ft (1,700 m)

Power Station
- Installed capacity: 200 MW

Echo Park Dam was proposed in the 1950s by the United States Bureau of Reclamation as a central feature of the Colorado River Storage Project. Situated on the Green River, a major tributary of the Colorado River, the dam was proposed for the Echo Park district of Dinosaur National Monument, flooding much of the Green and Yampa river valleys in the monument. The dam was bitterly opposed by preservationists, who saw the encroachment of a dam into an existing national park as another Hetch Hetchy, to be opposed as an appropriation of protected lands for development purposes. The Echo Park project was abandoned in favor of Glen Canyon Dam on the main stem of the Colorado, in lands that were not at that time protected. This was eventually regarded as a strategic mistake by conservation organizations.

== Project history ==
The Echo Park Dam project was first proposed in 1941. Dinosaur National Monument was, at the time of its designation in 1915, a small 80-acre (32 ha) park unit focused on the dinosaur fossil beds discovered along the Green River in 1909. The monument was expanded in 1938 to 200,000 acres (81,000 ha), encompassing the canyon networks of the Green and Yampa upstream from the dinosaur quarry. The newly added areas were little known to the public and to the Park Service, and the Park Service initially did not oppose the dam plans, having allied itself with the Bureau of Reclamation to develop Boulder Dam National Recreation Area (later Lake Mead National Recreation Area) and other reservoirs as public recreation facilities. The Park Service finally came out against the proposal in 1950, with director Newton B. Drury in opposition to the position of Secretary of the Interior Oscar L. Chapman, whose department controlled both the Park Service and the Bureau of Reclamation. Drury stated in the 1950 Park Service annual report that reservoir projects would "destroy or impair the beauty and interest" of the national parks.

Drury, a Republican in a Democratic administration, resigned in 1951, leading to criticism of Chapman for forcing Drury out. Drury was succeeded for eight months by Arthur Demaray, then by Conrad Wirth. Wirth took a less confrontational approach, partly under orders from Chapman to make the disagreement less public. Wirth was an advocate of public recreation lands associated with Reclamation projects, and suggested that Echo Park could become a National Recreation Area once flooded with a reservoir.

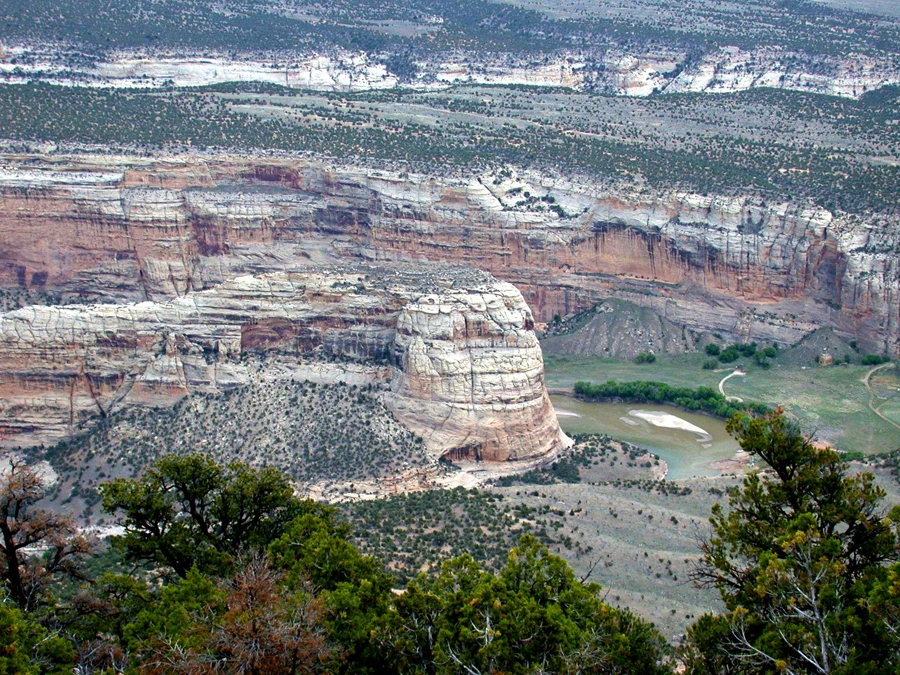
Steamboat Rock, near the Echo Park damsite

The first widely published public reaction to the Echo Park Dam proposal was a July 22, 1950 article by Bernard DeVoto in The Saturday Evening Post, entitled "Shall We Let Them Ruin Our National Parks?" Implicitly comparing the flooding of Echo Park to the Hetch Hetchy intrusion in Yosemite, the article was picked up by Reader's Digest and saw wide circulation.

The Colorado River Storage Project was proposed by the Bureau of Reclamation in the early 1950s as an integrated plan for collecting and using the waters of the upper Colorado River. Politically, the project had the backing of the upper Colorado states: Colorado, Wyoming and Utah, as well as Arizona, who had all fought with California over water allocations from the Colorado, of which California consumed a disproportionate share. Construction of storage reservoirs high on the river system would allow the upstream states more control over the water and its use.

In 1955, the new Secretary of the Interior Douglas McKay withdrew the Interior Department's support for the Echo Park Dam.

=== Glen Canyon Dam ===
Glen Canyon Dam was proposed from the beginning of the Colorado River Storage Project as the project's chief feature. Secretary of the Interior Harold Ickes had proposed the establishment of Escalante National Monument in 1936, at 2,450 square miles (6,300 km^{2}) twice the size of Yellowstone National Park, that would have encompassed Glen Canyon and the surrounding lands. The proposal was whittled down by excluding grazing lands, and then by intervention by Utah, favoring the reservation of Glen Canyon as a reservoir site.

In the 1940s and 1950s this proposal was apparently forgotten or ignored. The Glen Canyon region was a virtually unknown wilderness, not widely regarded as particularly high in scenic value. A 1946 survey of potential recreational resources undertaken by the National Park Service in the Colorado Basin entirely omits the Glen Canyon region from its assessment, focusing instead on the Aquarius Plateau to the northwest and Monument Valley to the southeast.

The Park Service had no official opinion on Glen Canyon, since it was not a Park Service unit and was tacitly excluded from Park Service plans, while the Sierra Club, focused on the fight to keep water development out of established parks, failed to realize until it was too late that Glen Canyon possessed scenic and wilderness value even greater than Dinosaur. Sierra Club executive director David Brower's assent to a suggestion that the proposed Glen Canyon Dam be raised led Brower's critics to argue that he effectively sacrificed Glen Canyon to save Dinosaur. Brower considered the trade to be his biggest mistake.

== Project details ==
The Echo Park project actually involved two dams: the main Echo Park Dam with a reservoir pool elevation of 5,570 feet (1,700 m) above sea level and a smaller afterbay dam downstream at Split Mountain, that would collect and re-regulate discharges from the main dam, assuring an even river flow. The Split Mountain pool was planned for an elevation of 5,050 feet (1,540 m).

Echo Park Dam was planned for a site just downstream from Steamboat Rock, a monolith standing just below the confluence of the Green and Yampa, where the Green flows out of Echo Park, a broad wooded flatland walled by steep canyon cliffs. Located at the base of Harpers Point, the dam was to be a 529-foot (161 m) high concrete gravity dam. Above Echo Park, the 6,400,000-acre-foot (7.9 km^{3}) reservoir was to flood the Canyon of Lodore, extending upstream through Browns Park. The Yampa was to be flooded as well to Lily Park. Roughly half of Steamboat Rock's height would have been underwater, along with archeological sites, caves and wilderness valleys. A Park Service report on the dam's effects on the monument called it a "lamentable intrusion" with "particularly deplorable effects" on wilderness and geological features in the monument. Electric power transmission lines would intrude into the park as well. Installed power generating capacity was to amount to 200 MW.

Split Mountain Dam
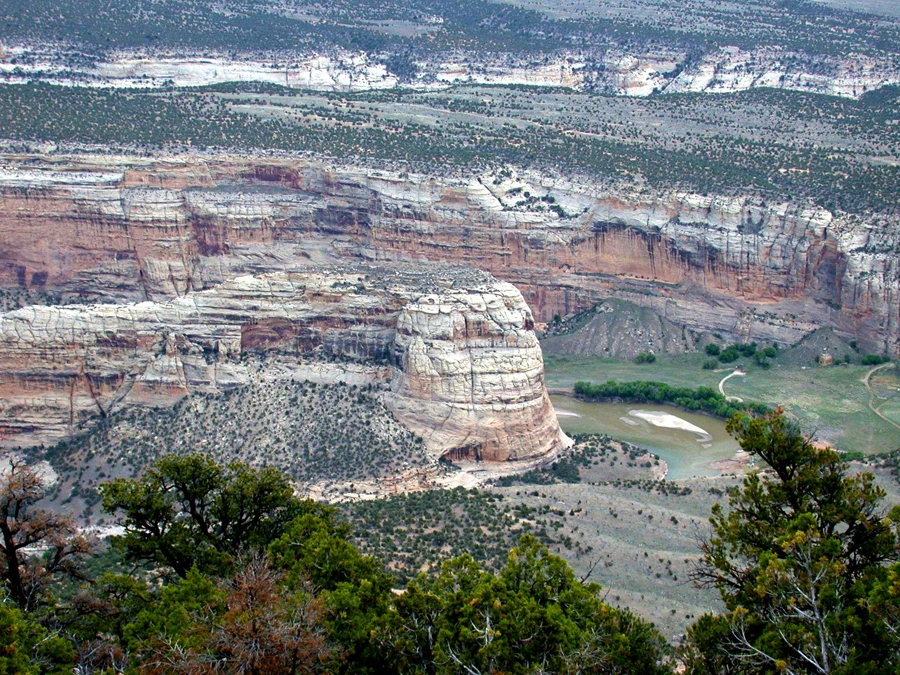
- Interactive map of Split Mountain Dam
- Country: United States
- Location: Northeastern Utah
- Status: Unbuilt
- Owner: U.S. Bureau of Reclamation

Dam and spillways
- Impounds: Green River
- Height: 118 feet (36 m)

Reservoir
- Normal elevation: 5,048 ft (1,539 m)

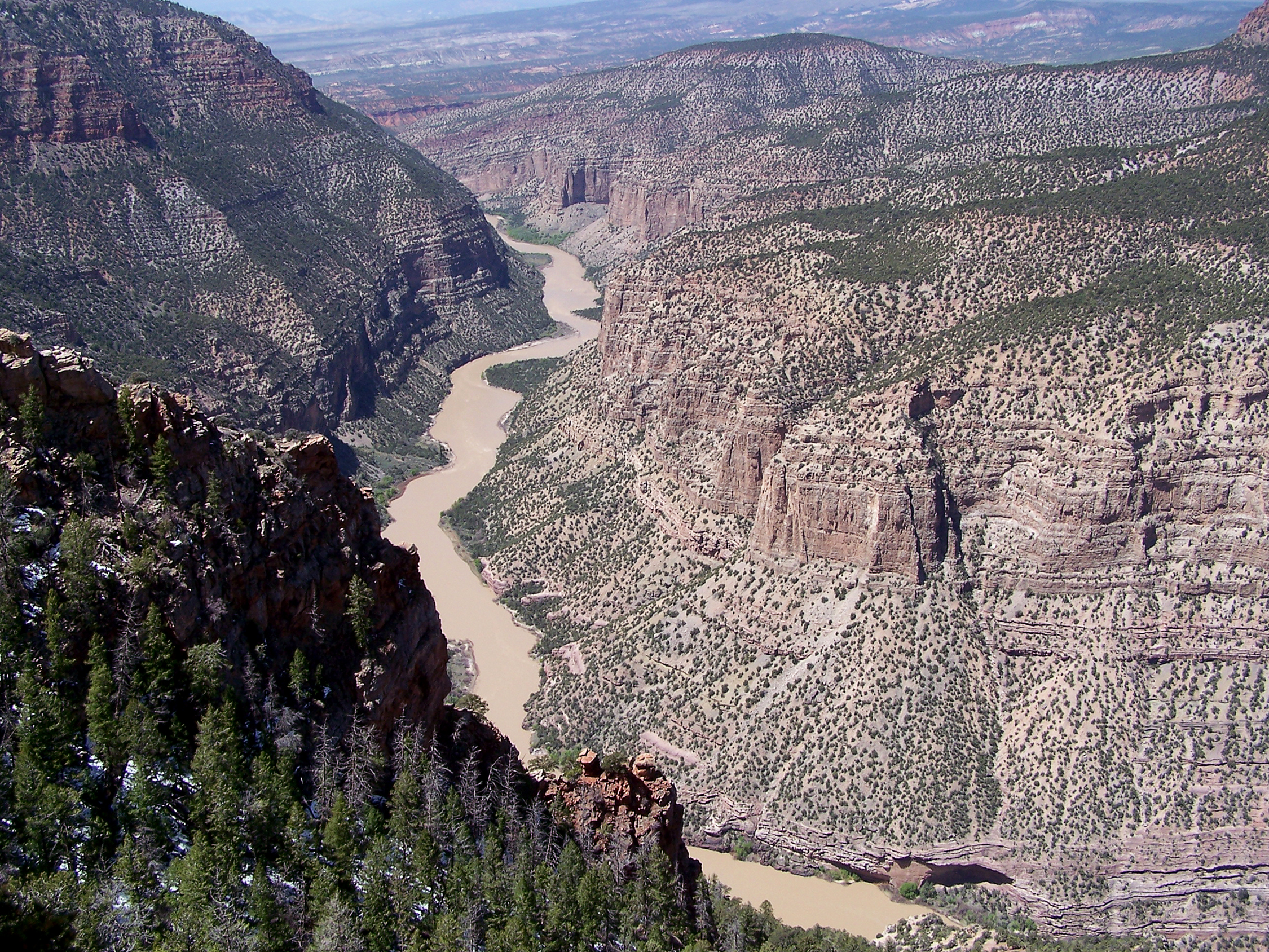
Whirlpool Canyon, which would have been flooded by Split Mountain Dam

Split Mountain Dam, 118 feet (36 m) high, was to be sited a couple of miles downstream from Split Mountain, about two miles in a straight line from the Quarry Visitor Center, or about ten river miles upstream. The pool was to back up through Whirlpool Canyon to the toe of Echo Park Dam. The two dams were to create slackwater reservoirs throughout virtually the entire monument on the Green and Yampa. Although Split Mountain Dam was to have a hydraulic height of about 100 feet (30 m), a 9,000-foot (2,700 m) penstock was planned to be built to carry water across a deep bend of the Green, taking advantage of the river's fall to create a 200-foot (61 m) head for power generation. The Split Mountain reservoir would have inundated Rainbow, Island and Little Rainbow Parks.

== See also ==
- Environmental history of the United States#Organizations
