= Dorothy Waugh (artist) =

American graphic designer, illustrator, and author (1896 - 1996)

- Born: September 23, 1896; Burlington, Vermont
- Died: March 20, 1996 (aged 99)
- Education: George School; Massachusetts School of Art; Museum School of the Cleveland Museum of Art; Ecole des Beaux Arts d'Orlean; John Herron School of Art; School of the Art Institute of Chicago
- Father: Frank Albert Waugh
- Relatives: Frederick V. Waugh; Albert Waugh; Sidney Waugh

Dorothy Waugh (September 23, 1896 - March 20, 1996) was an American artist, illustrator, landscape architect, and author best known for creating a series of posters promoting national and state parks in the 1930s. Her work for the National Park Service (NPS) in designing posters is considered influential in the early use of graphic art by a federal agency to promote public lands.

== Early life ==
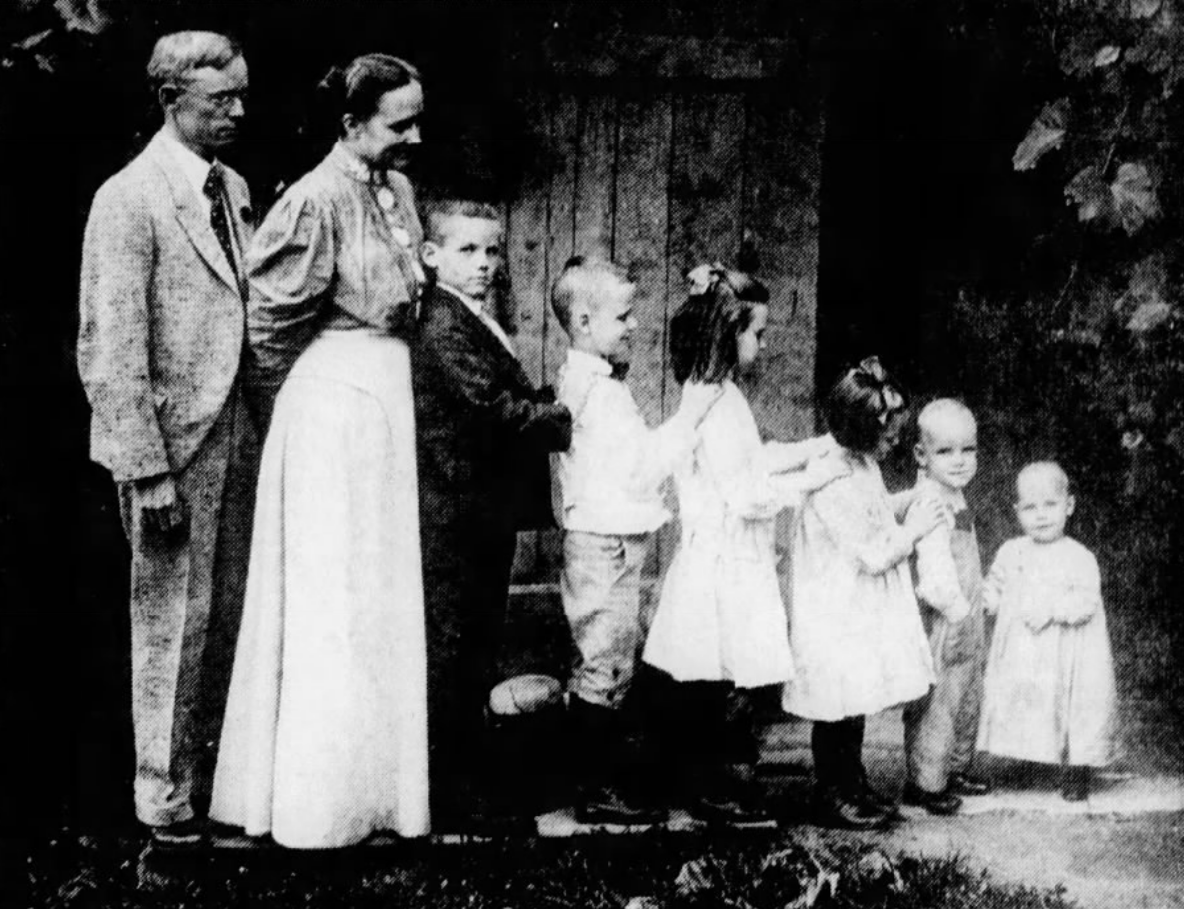
The Waugh family in 1905; Dorothy is fifth from the left.

Waugh was born in Burlington, Vermont, on September 23, 1896 to Mary (née Mary Vail) and Frank Albert Waugh. In August 1902, the family moved to Amherst, Massachusetts so that the father, a landscape architect, could teach at the Massachusetts Agricultural College, which later became the Massachusetts State College and then the University of Massachusetts Amherst. Among her five siblings were Frederick V. Waugh, an agricultural economist; Albert Waugh, a provost at the University of Connecticut (1950–1965); and Sidney Waugh, a sculptor and glass designer.

Waugh often sat in on her father's classes on landscape architecture at the University of Massachusetts Amherst. She attended the George School, a Friends' boarding and preparatory school in Bucks County, Pennsylvania. Waugh was editor-in-chief of the school paper in her senior year.

In 1916, she enrolled in the School of the Art Institute of Chicago (SAIC) (Note: A 1977 interview article stated that her father sent her 'to the Art Institute in Chicago to make her more independent. "It worked too well" [Waugh] said with good humor.') only to be interrupted by the entry of the United States into World War I. A 1935 newspaper article noted her as a Massachusetts State College '17 alumna. Waugh also studied at the Massachusetts School of Art, the Museum School of the Cleveland Museum of Art, the New Orleans Ecole des Beaux Arts, the John Herron School of Art, and the Trenton School of Art.

Waugh's first job was for a summer at a florist, and her second was at a nursery. Later she worked with landscape architects in Boston and Charlotte, North Carolina. In 1921, Waugh took a position as a landscape artist in Cleveland.

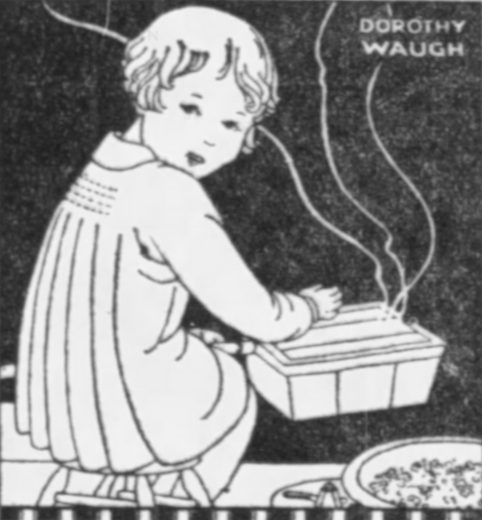
Snow in the House (1928)

In 1925, she and her brother Sidney exhibited works at an exhibition at Massachusetts Agricultural College.

She applied for a passport in 1924, and the next year she traveled to England with Sidney and her father and helped create illustrations of English war memorials for a journal article. In the winter of 1925–1926, Waugh studied landscape art in southern Italy. Upon returning to the United States, she took a job with a landscape architecture firm in New Orleans.

By 1927, Waugh had returned to SAIC in Chicago. During this time she studied book design with Ernst Detterer, a calligrapher and typographer who also taught the history of printing. In 1928, Waugh graduated from SAIC with honors and exhibited in the annual exhibition of the Art Students' League of Chicago. She then worked in Chicago at illustration, copywriting, and design for publishers and advertising firms.

Waugh moved to New York City in 1931 to work as an artist and an author. Later that year, Henry Holt and Company published her book, Among the Leaves and Grasses, an illustrated children's book about common insects. Her free-lance work in New York included "writing, editing, book designing, illustrating and doing jackets for Harcourt Brace, William Morrow, Longmans, Green, Farrar & Rinehart, and other firms."

== Work for the National Park Service ==
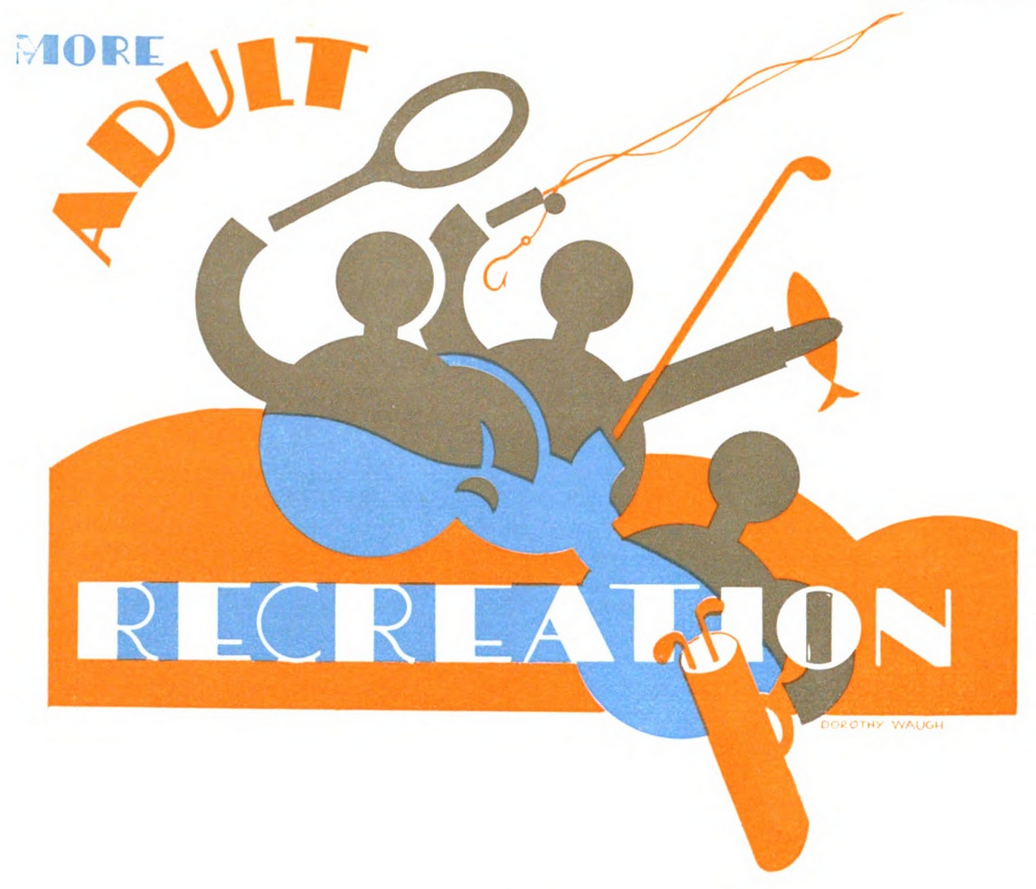
"More Adult Recreation", Recreational use of land in the United States: Part XI of the Report on land planning (1934)

Conrad Wirth had studied with Waugh's father Frank while earning his Bachelor of Science degree in landscape gardening from Massachusetts Agricultural College (now the University of Massachusetts Amherst). Wirth joined the National Park Service (NPS) in 1931. With the coming of the New Deal, he supervised the service's Civilian Conservation Corps (CCC) program in the state parks. Many CCC participants could not interpret blueprints or the accompanying directives. To address this he hired Dorothy Waugh in August 1933 to develop simplified diagrams and instructions for constructing basic park structures. Waugh produced Portfolio of Comfort Stations and Privies (1934) and Portfolio of Park Structures and Facilities (1934). During this time she also drew color illustrations for Recreational use of land in the United States: Part XI of the Report on land planning (1934).

Due to the scale and importance of this effort for the CCC, Waugh went from being the sole NPS employee working on the project to hiring and leading a team of male draftsmen. Additionally, the government hired architects to supervise the building projects who added their own drawings as needed. This meant that her portfolios were followed by manuals in which Waugh had an advisory role, but no longer was contributing drawings.

In 1933, the Roosevelt administration designated 1934 as the "National Parks Year." This allowed for a small budget to create a marketing campaign for the National Parks. Waugh designed posters for the campaign, although she was hampered by the small budget for materials that required her to execute her design on the first try. By late summer of 1934, she had produced "a set of six colorful posters depicting national park scenes." In 1935, Waugh produced another five posters, with recreation the theme for two, cultural heritage for two, and wildlife preservation for the fifth.

In 1936, Waugh produced posters for both National and State parks. Although National Park Service Director Arno B. Cammerer wrote that there were "six posters being issued", only five have been verified. Perhaps this was due to a poster that Waugh designed and that the NPS printed for the Bureau of Biological Survey, then part of the United States Department of Agriculture. The Bureau of Biological Survey, however, disliked the poster's style and the National Park Service subsequently destroyed all 5,000 copies. Also in 1936, Waugh sketched designs for "Fifty colorful envelope stickers -- 35 National Park and 15 State Park -- depicting scenes and activities in these areas" that the National Park Service issued.

In Spring of 1937, the Park Service Bulletin announced that Waugh had resigned the National Park Service and had become "head of the Juvenile Book Department of Alfred Knopf [sic]."

== Later working years ==
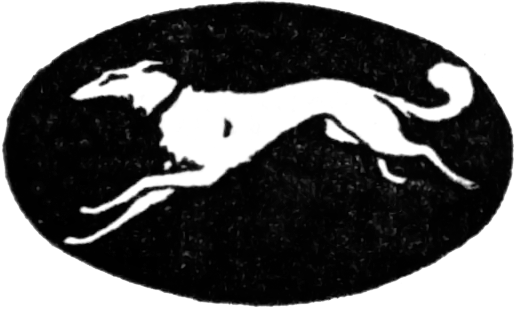
Starting in May 1937, Waugh re-established and reorganized the Department of Books for Young People at Alfred A. Knopf In addition to editing, laying out, and designing the Young People's books, Waugh publicized them through the Borzoi Books for Young People catalog and a mimeographed newsletter, The Borzoi Puppy, both of which referenced Knopf's borzoi logo ( ) in its colophon. Under her stewardship, the department's sales steadily increased.

Although successful, she sought a less demanding position so she could pursue outside interests. In 1940, Waugh left Knopf for a position as the head of public relations at the Montclair Public Library, working there until her retirement at the end of April 1965. During this tenure she was also a public relations specialist for the Office of the Mayor. Starting about the same time, Waugh began teaching typography and production at Parsons School of Design, then a year later, "advanced advertising design for wartime service" at Cooper Union School of Art.

During here time at the Montclair Public Library, Waugh wrote articles and provided illustrations for various periodical publications, including American Magazine, Christian Science Monitor, Country Gentleman, Explicator, Family Circle, Flower Grower, Horticulture, Landscape Architecture, Library Journal, New York Herald Tribune, New York Times, Popular Gardening, Recreation, Yankee, and others. She also wrote and illustrated four books during this period.

== Works ==
=== Gallery ===
Posters created by Dorothy Waugh for the National Park Service
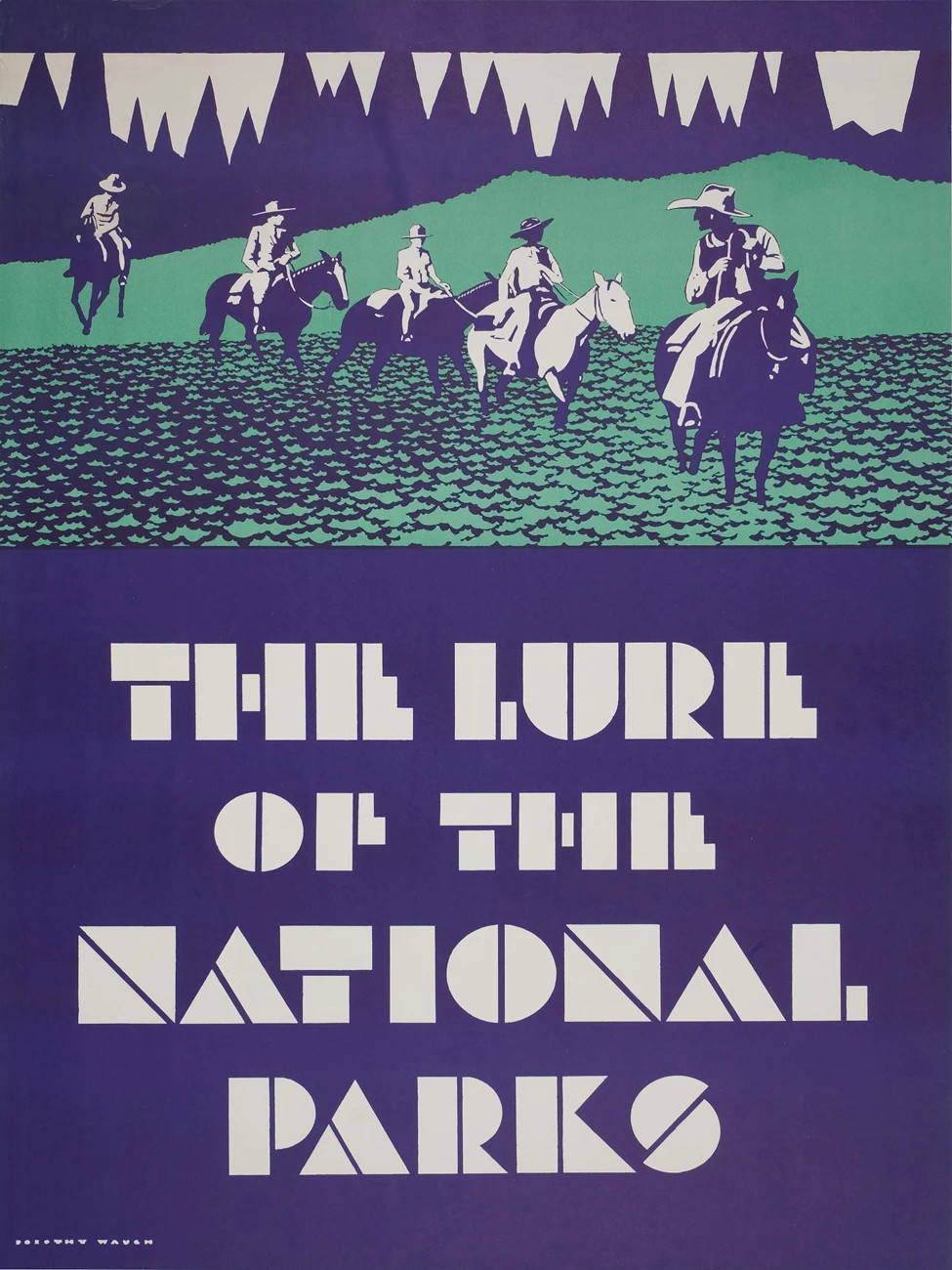
The Lure of the National Parks (1934)

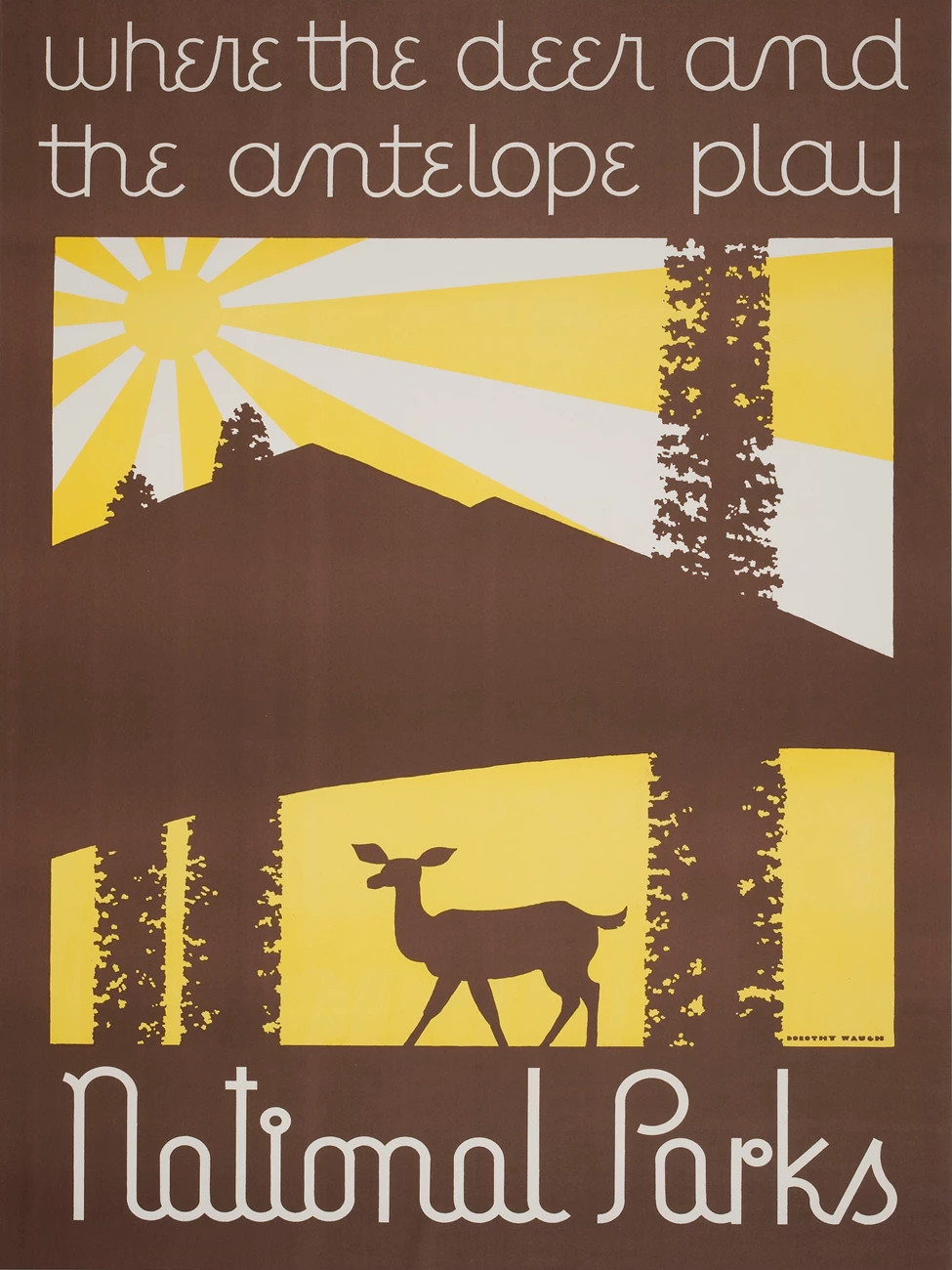
Where the Deer and the Antelope Play National Parks (1934)

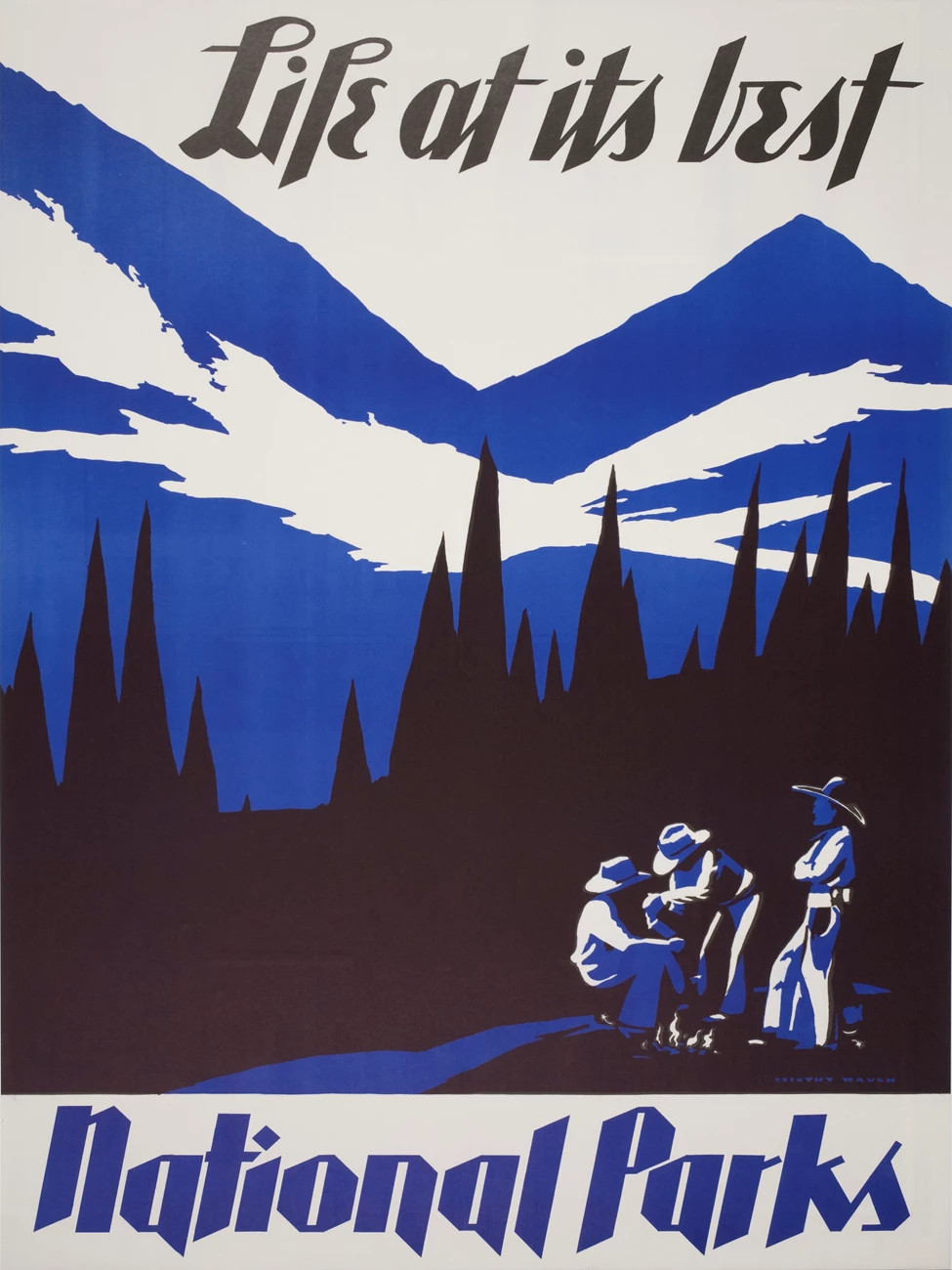
Life at its Best National Parks (1934)

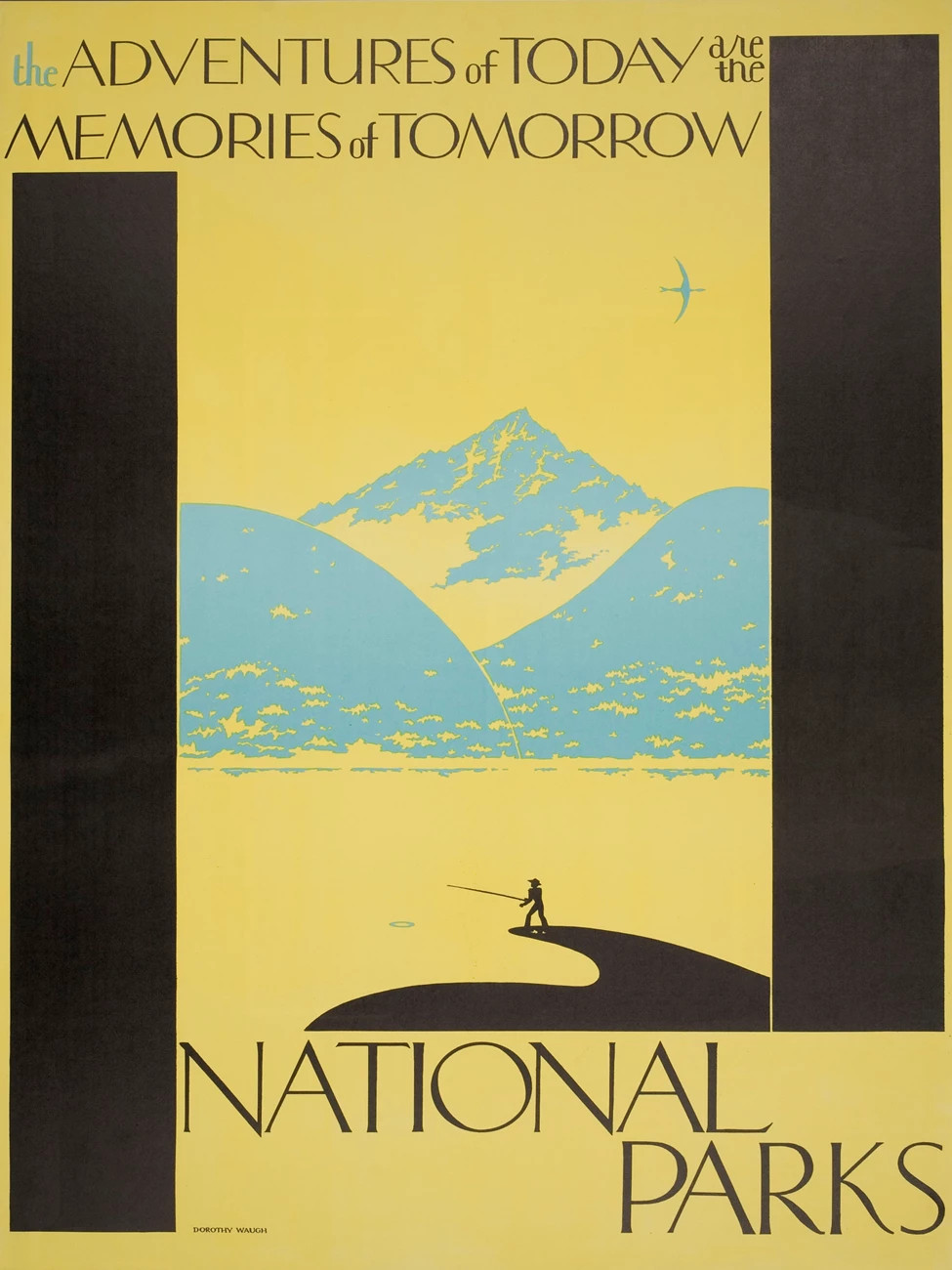
The Adventures of Today are the Memories of Tomorrow (1934)

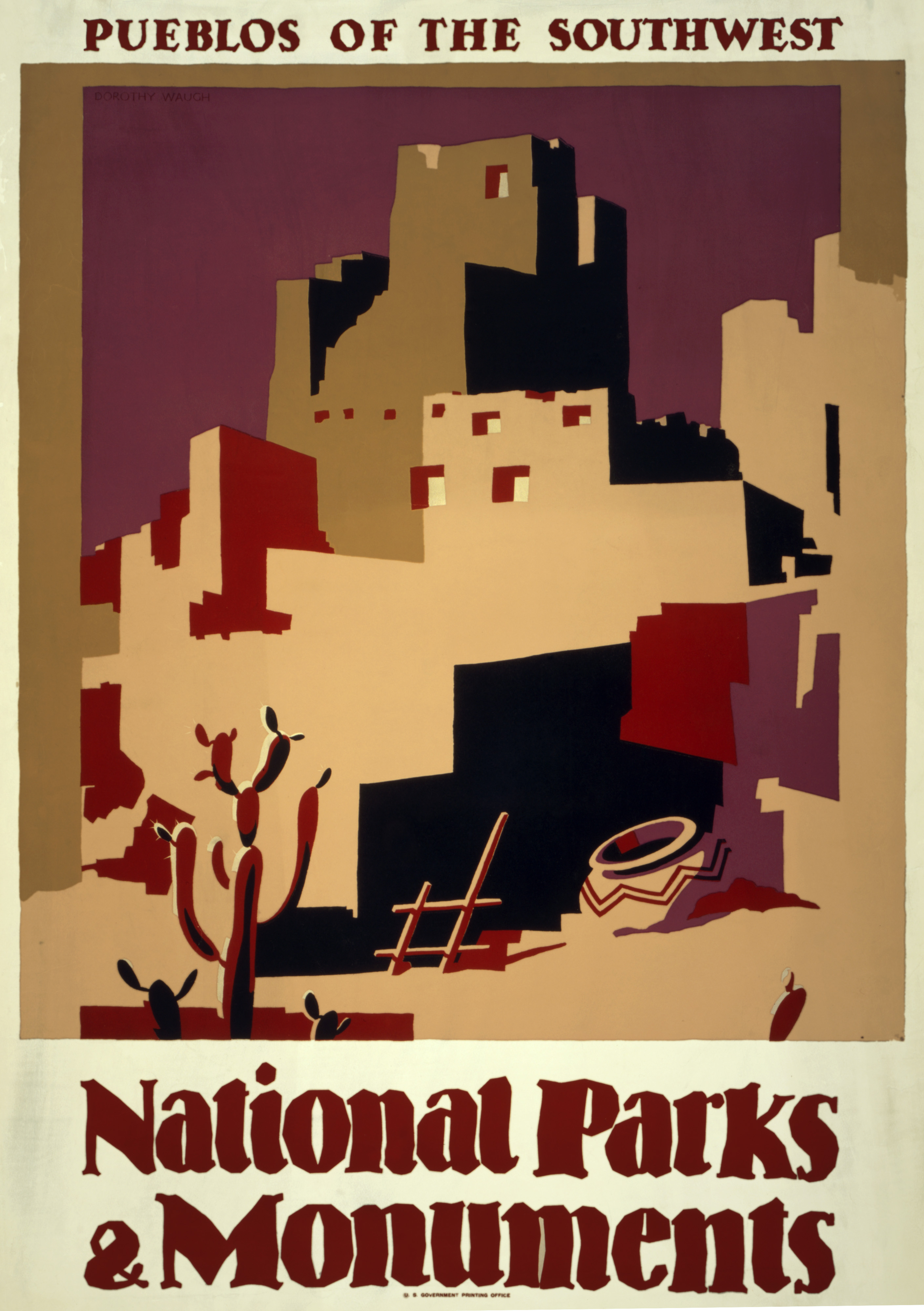
Pueblos of the Southwest (1935)

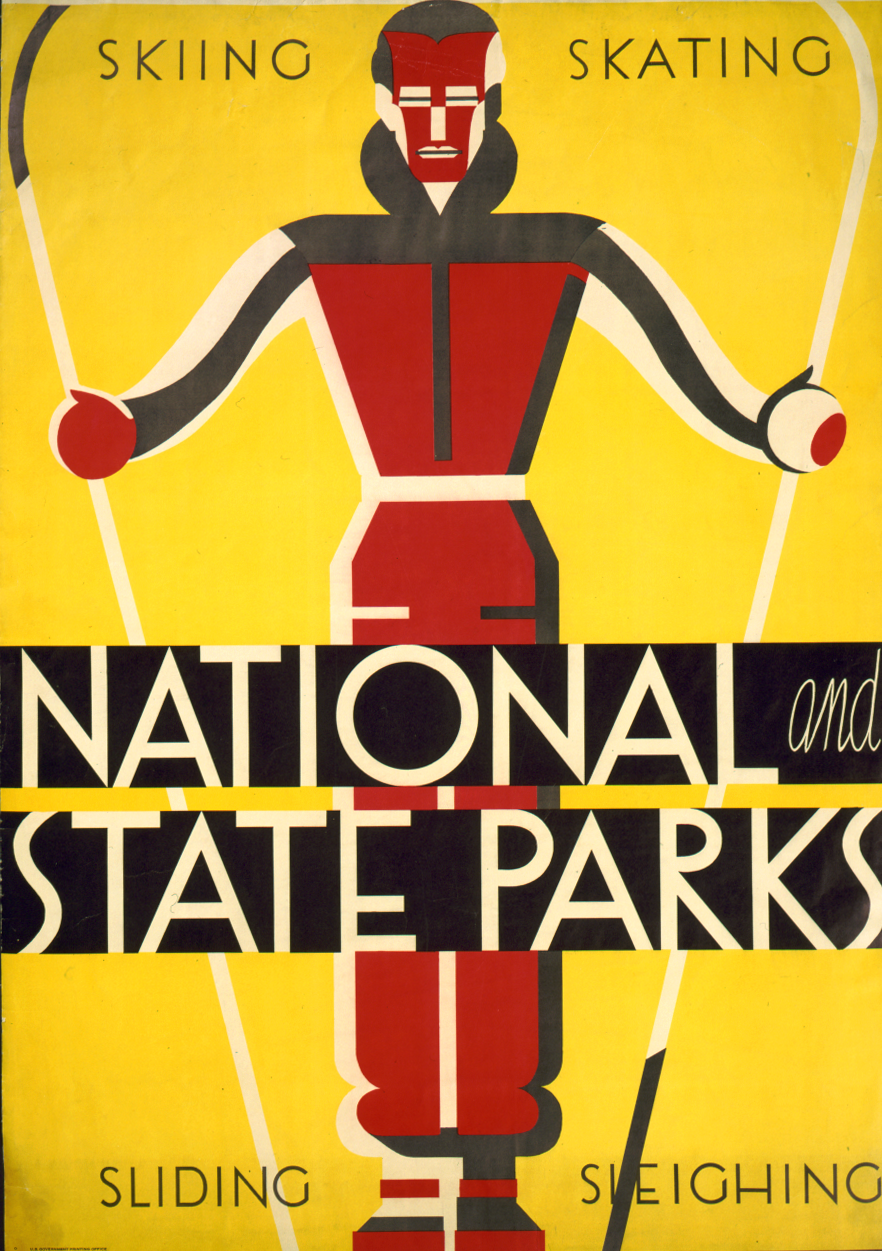
Winter Sports, National and State Parks (1936)

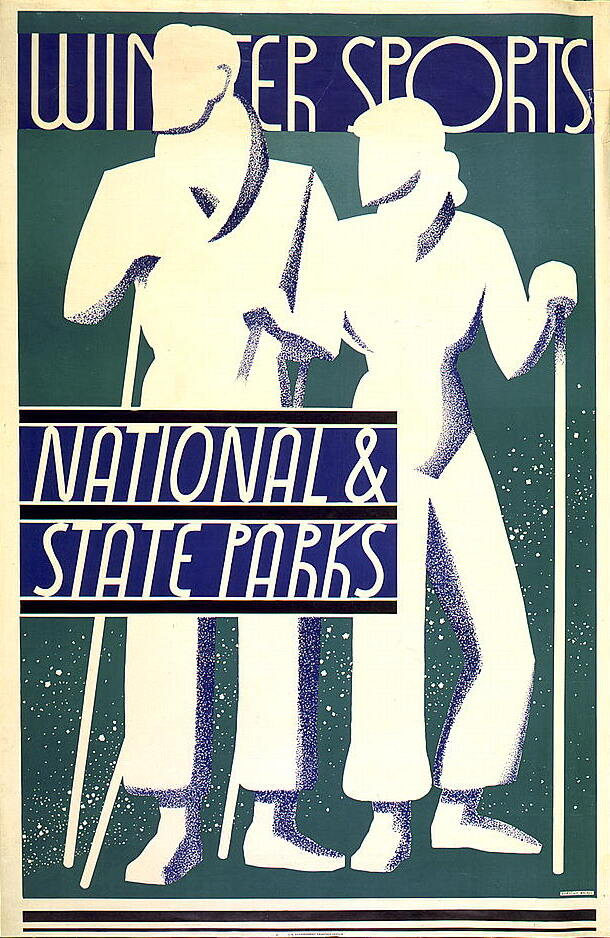
Winter Sports, National & State Parks (1936)

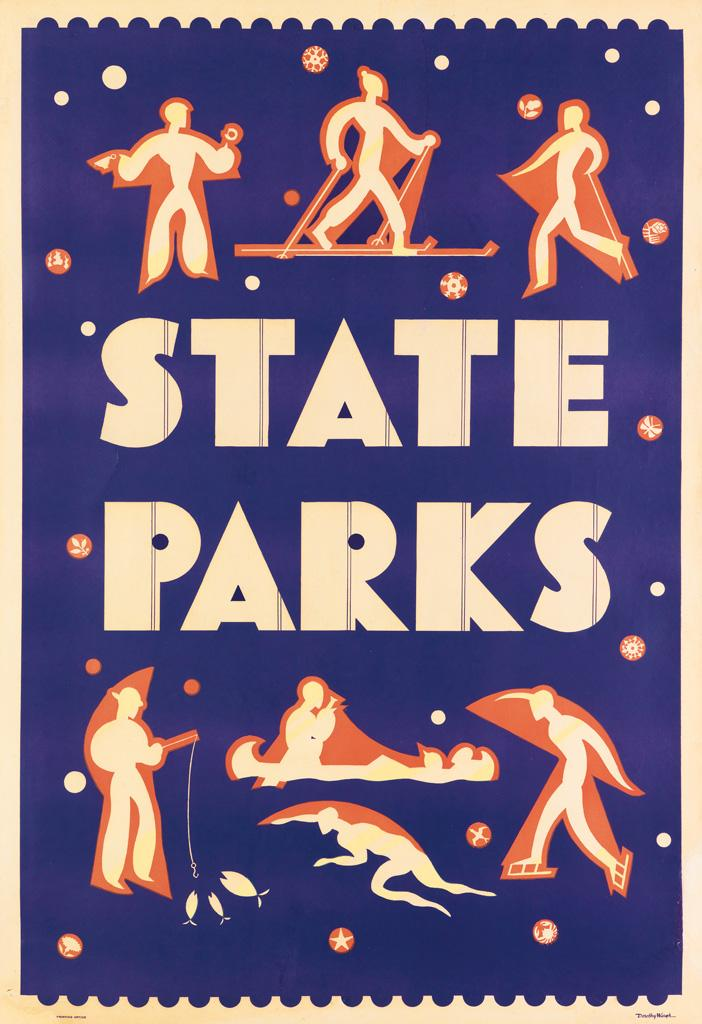
State Parks [Year-Round Recreation] (1936)

=== Publications ===
==== Books ====
- Among the Leaves and Grasses. New York: Henry Holt & Co. 1931. OCLC 509732.
- Warm earth. London: Oxford University Press. 1943. OCLC 2538122.
- Muriel Saves String. New York: D. McKay Co. 1956. OCLC 1036773757 – via Internet Archive.
- A Handbook of Christmas Decorations. New York: Macmillan. 1958. OCLC 949981517 – via HathiTrust. 2011 edition: ISBN 978-1-258-21994-9
- Festive Decoration the Year Round. New York: Macmillan. 1962. OCLC 894729993 – via Internet Archive.
- Emily Dickinson's Beloved: A Surmise. New York: Vantage Press. 1976. ISBN 978-0-533-01945-8. OCLC 2392674.
- Emily Dickinson Briefly. New York: Vantage Press. 1990. ISBN 978-0-533-08762-4. OCLC 23364008.

==== Articles ====
- "Parklets: Gardens of Eden for Those Who Cannot Go to a Real Park". Landscape Architecture. 37 (2). American Society of Landscape Architects: 56–56. 1947. ISSN 0023-8031. JSTOR 44660160. OCLC 82518310.
- "Dickinson's Those Not Live Yet". The Explicator. 15 (4): 52–53. 1957. doi:10.1080/00144940.1957.11481905. ISSN 0014-4940. OCLC 6911191883.
