= Andrew W. Mellon Memorial Fountain =

Fountain in Washington, D.C

- Fountain in 2008
- Artist: Sidney Waugh
- Year: 1951
- Type: Bronze, Granite, Quartz
- Dimensions: 12 m (38 ft)
- Location: Washington, D.C., United States; 38°53′32.4″N 77°1′10.3″W
- Owner: Department of the Interior

The Andrew W. Mellon Memorial Fountain is a bronze fountain sculpture by Sidney Waugh as a memorial to Andrew W. Mellon. It is located at the eastern tip of the Federal Triangle within the intersection of Pennsylvania Avenue, Constitution Avenue, and 6th Street NW in Washington D.C., United States. The fountain is across Constitution Avenue from the West Building of the National Gallery of Art. The Department of the Interior maintains the fountain, which President Harry S. Truman dedicated on May 9, 1952.

== Description ==
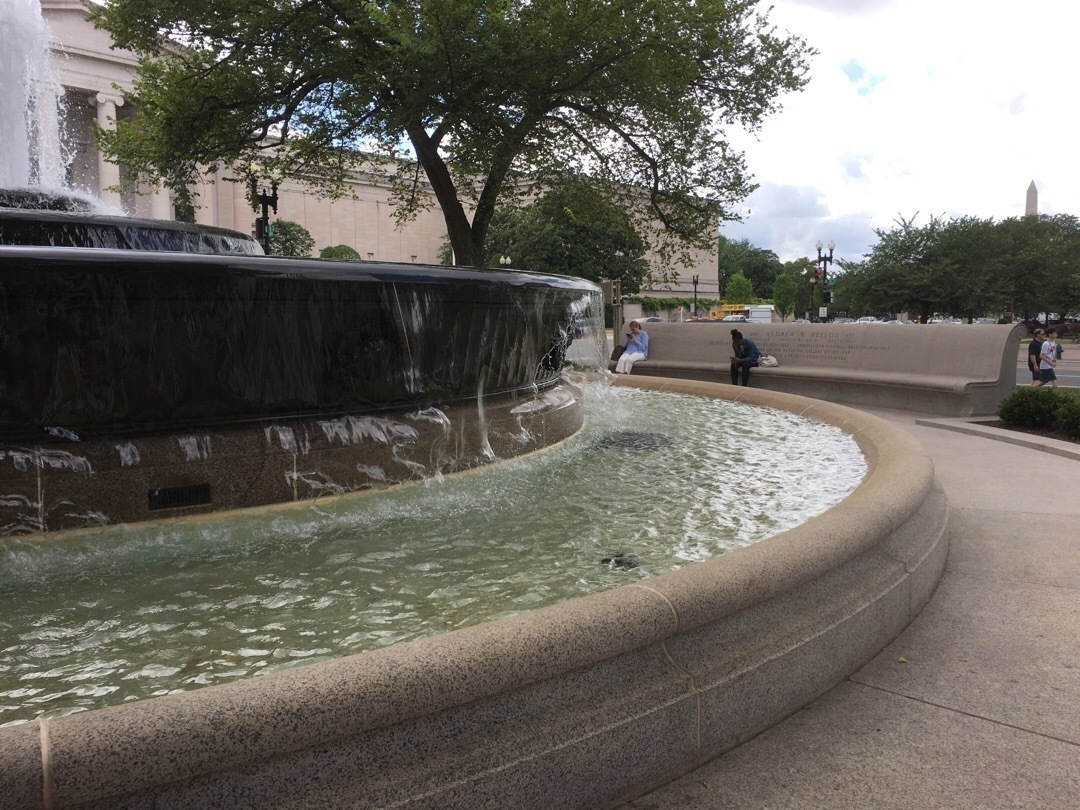
Andrew W. Mellon Memorial Fountain and bench, with West Building of the National Gallery of Art in background (2018)

The round fountain is made up of three small-to-large nested bronze basins, which sit in a granite outer basin. The outer, and largest, bronze basin is decorated in zodiac signs which sit in their "correct astrological position for the sun's rays." The small basin serves as the venue for a 20 foot tall water spouting jet. The water then proceeds to spill over the small basin and over the edge of the other basins, eventually over and into the granite basin. Surrounding the fountain is a seven foot wide granite walkway and a semi-circular granite bench.

The inscription on the bench reads:

1855.ANDREW W. MELLON.1937
FINANCIER.INDUSTRIALIST.STATESMAN
SECRETARY OF THE TREASURY 1921–1932 AMBASSADOR TO GREAT BRITAIN 1932–1933
FOUNDER OF THE NATIONAL GALLERY OF ART 1937
THIS FOUNTAIN IS A TRIBUTE FROM HIS FRIENDS

== Information ==
"It sits like an island, traffic whizzing by on the three major arteries." – Gary Tischler

The fountain serves as a tribute to Andrew Mellon who served as Secretary of the Treasury from 1921 to 1932 and ambassador to Great Britain from 1932 to 1933. The fountain shares a Classical architecture style with and sits close by to the National Gallery of Art where Mellon donated his art collection, as well as funding to build the art museum. This memorial fountain cost $300,000, which was donated by Mellon's friends through the Andrew W. Mellon Memorial Committee. The fountain was dedicated on May 9, 1952 and sits on the former site of the Saint James Hotel.

=== Creation ===
Its creation was authorized by Congress on July 16, 1947 by the Joint Resolution 1701:

Resolved by the Senate and House of Representatives of the United States of America in Congress assembled, That the Secretary of the Interior is hereby authorized and directed to grant authority to the Andrew W. Mellon Memorial Committee to erect a memorial fountain on public grounds in the vicinity of the intersection of Pennsylvania and Constitution Avenues, in the District of Columbia, such grounds being now owned by the United States: Provided, That the design and location of the memorial shall be approved by the National Commission of Fine Arts and the National Capital Park and Planning Commission, and the United States shall be put to no expense in or by the erection of this memorial: Provided further, That unless funds, which in the estimation of the Secretary of the Interior are sufficient to insure the completion of the memorial, are certified available, and the erection of this memorial begun within five years from and after the date of passage of this joint resolution, the authorization hereby granted is revoked.

The fountain's cascading design was inspired by a fountain in Genoa, Italy. Tuck and Eipel served as the structural engineers and Edward E. Ashley Associates were the mechanical engineers. While excavating for the fountain, a 7 ft. x 8 ft. tunnel was discovered. The tunnel had to be backfilled with concrete to make a proper bearing capacity for the fountain. Two concentric rings of 30-ton concrete piles had to be driven down 30–40 ft. into the ground to ensure that the ground was level. The largest bronze basin was the largest of its kind ever cast at the time and required "casting in four sections" which had to be fitted together "with great precision". The fountain was cast by the General Bronze Company and Modern Art Factory may have cast the zodiac signs. The pink granite used is from the Swenson Pink Granite Quarry in South Berwick, Maine.

The Aries zodiac faces directly east with the Libra symbol facing west and the Virgo symbol arranged along Pennsylvania Avenue, leading to some believing that Masonic influences were essential in the architecture. On the vernal equinox the sun directly hits Aries, which then faces the rising sun a month later.

=== Condition ===
In 1993 the fountain was surveyed by the Smithsonian Institution's Save Outdoor Sculpture! program and was described as "well maintained".

== Artists ==
=== Sidney Waugh ===
Sidney Waugh, who designed the zodiacs, also designed the sculptures seen outside of the National Archives and Records Administration and the Federal Reserve Board buildings in Washington, D.C.

== See also ==
- List of public art in Washington, D.C., Ward 6
