= Sidney Waugh =

American sculptor (1904–1963)

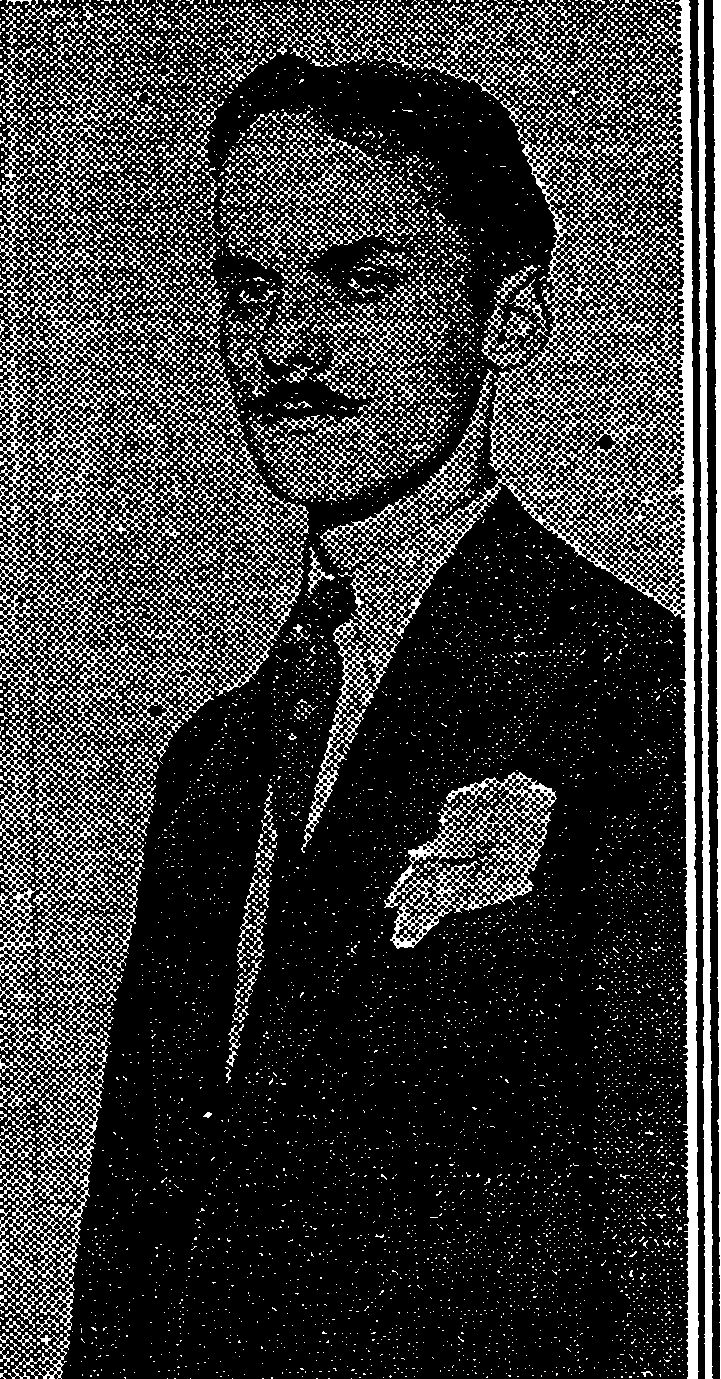
- Waugh in 1929
- Born: January 17, 1904; Amherst, Massachusetts, US
- Died: June 30, 1963 (aged 59); New York City, US
- Known for: Sculpture
- Father: Frank Albert Waugh
- Family: Albert Waugh; Dorothy Waugh; Frederick V. Waugh
- Awards: Prix de Rome (1929)

Sidney Biehler Waugh (January 17, 1904 – June 30, 1963) was an American sculptor known for his monuments, medals, etched and molded glass, and architectural sculpture.

== Biography ==
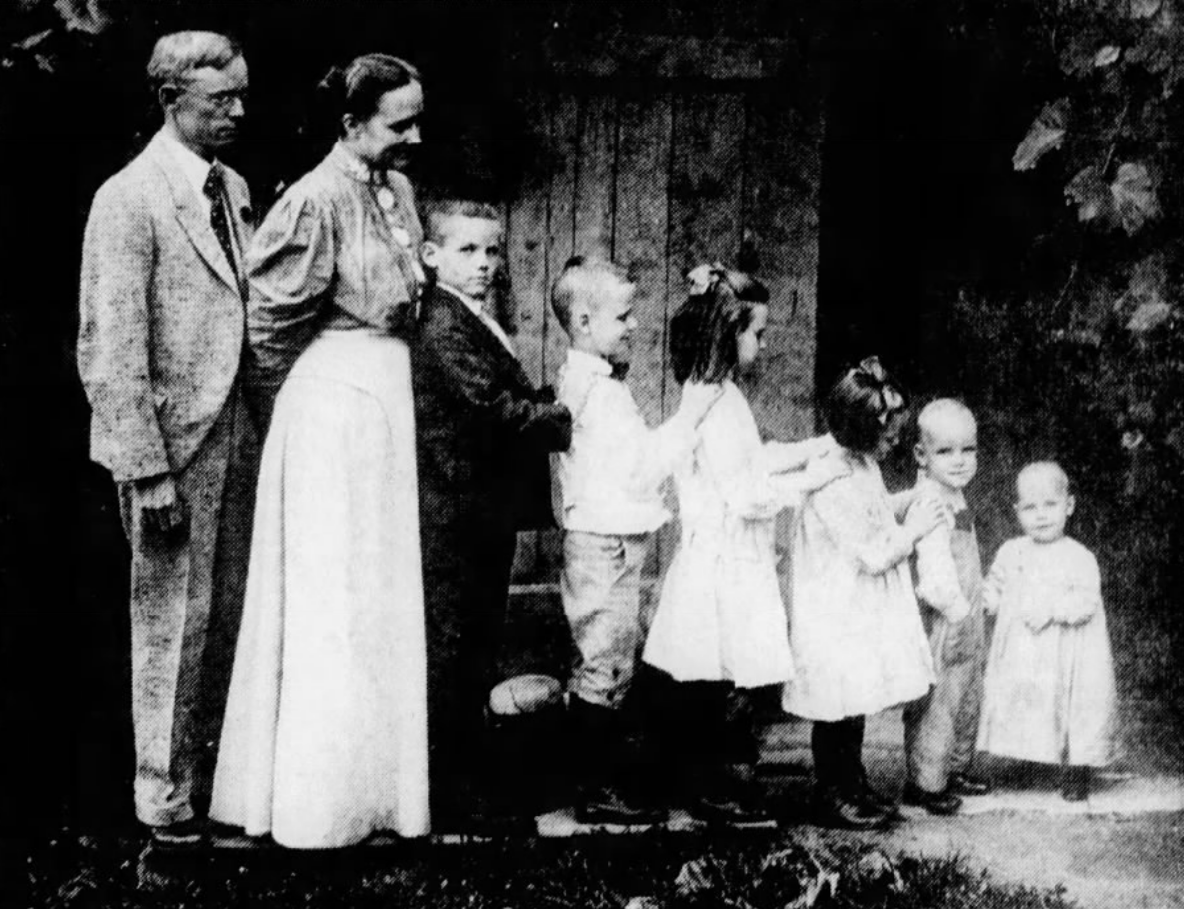
The Waugh family in 1905; Sidney is furthest on the right.

Waugh was born in Amherst, Massachusetts to Mary (née Mary Vail) and Frank Albert Waugh. His father was a landscape architect. Among his siblings were Frederick V. Waugh, an agricultural economist; Albert Waugh, a provost at the University of Connecticut (1950–1965); and Dorothy Waugh, an artist, illustrator, and landscape architect.

Waugh entered the Massachusetts Institute of Technology at the age of 16 and attended for three years. In 1925, he and his sister Dorothy exhibited works at an exhibition at Massachusetts Agricultural College. After this, he studied at the American Academy in Rome and in Paris where he studied with Antoine Bourdelle and worked as an assistant to Henri Bouchard.

He won bronze and silver medals in 1928 and 1929, respectively, at the Salon de Printemps. In 1929 he won the Prix de Rome where he stayed until 1932. He was commissioned by Steuben Glass in 1934 to prepare for designs for the reinvigorated company under the directorship of Arthur Houghton.

During World War II, Waugh served in the US Army as a Captain and received the Silver Star, the Bronze Star, and two Croix de Guerres, and was named a Knight of the Order of the Crown of Italy. He initially served in the US Army Air Force intelligence. In September 1943, he transferred to the Monuments, Fine Arts, and Archives program (MFAA), more commonly known as the "Monuments Men". He worked in North Africa and Italy. After the Battle of Monte Cassino, Waugh helped secure and recover art work and other valuables from the Abbey of Monte Cassino after it was nearly destroyed by Allied bombing.

The year after the war ended, Waugh married Elizabeth Pettigrew Lake. She had also worked for Steuben Glass.

Waugh was later appointed sculptor for the American Battle Monuments Commission for whom he produced The Spirit of American Youth and another representing the spirit of peace on the central high pylon at the Florence American Cemetery and Memorial.

Waugh died in New York City in 1963.

== Works ==
=== Gallery ===
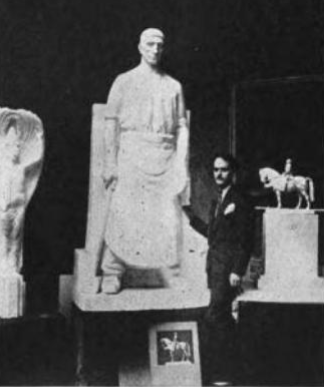
Waugh and his sculpture Steel (1929), which won him a Prix de Rome

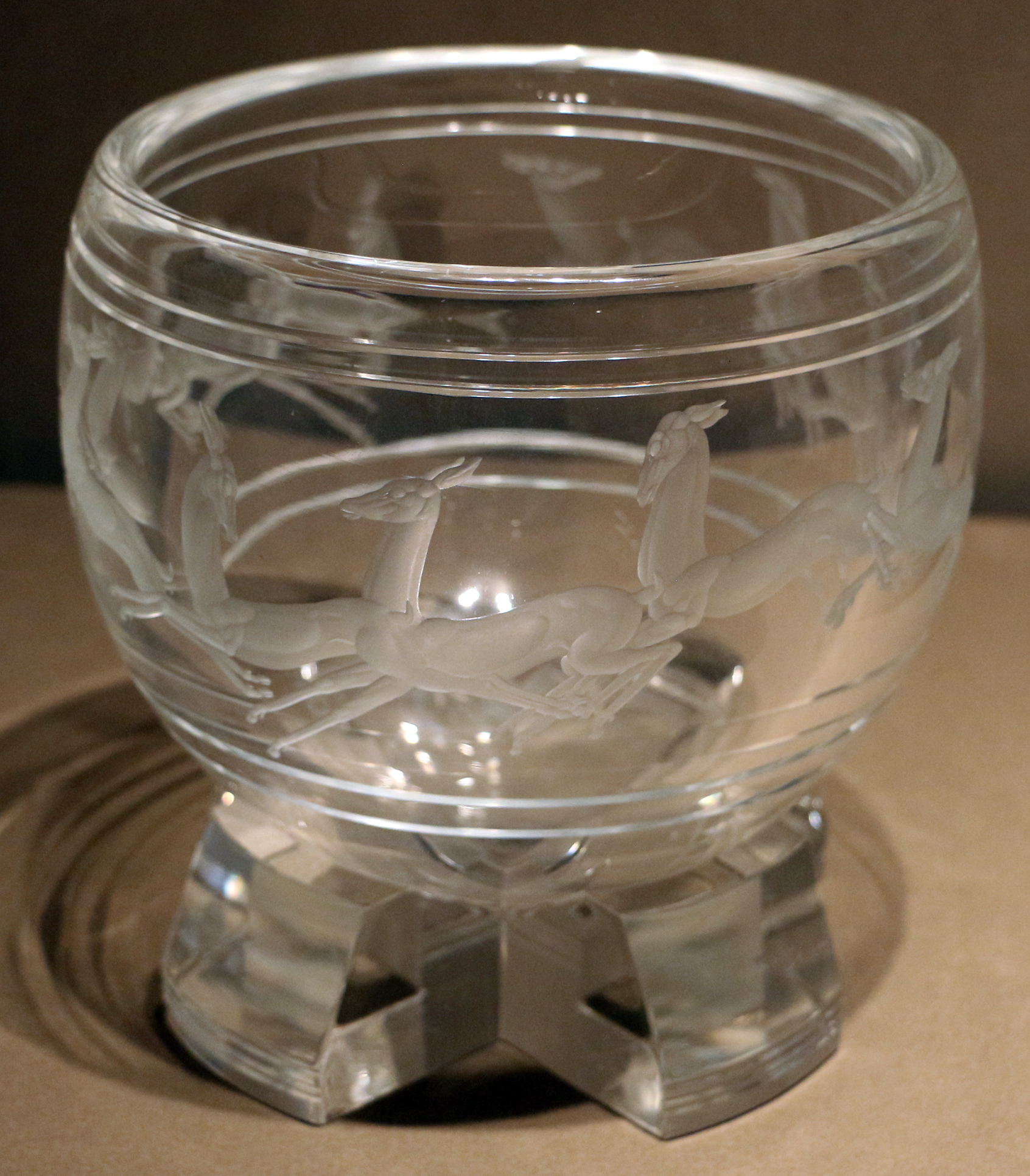
Glassware (1935) in the Indianapolis Museum of Art

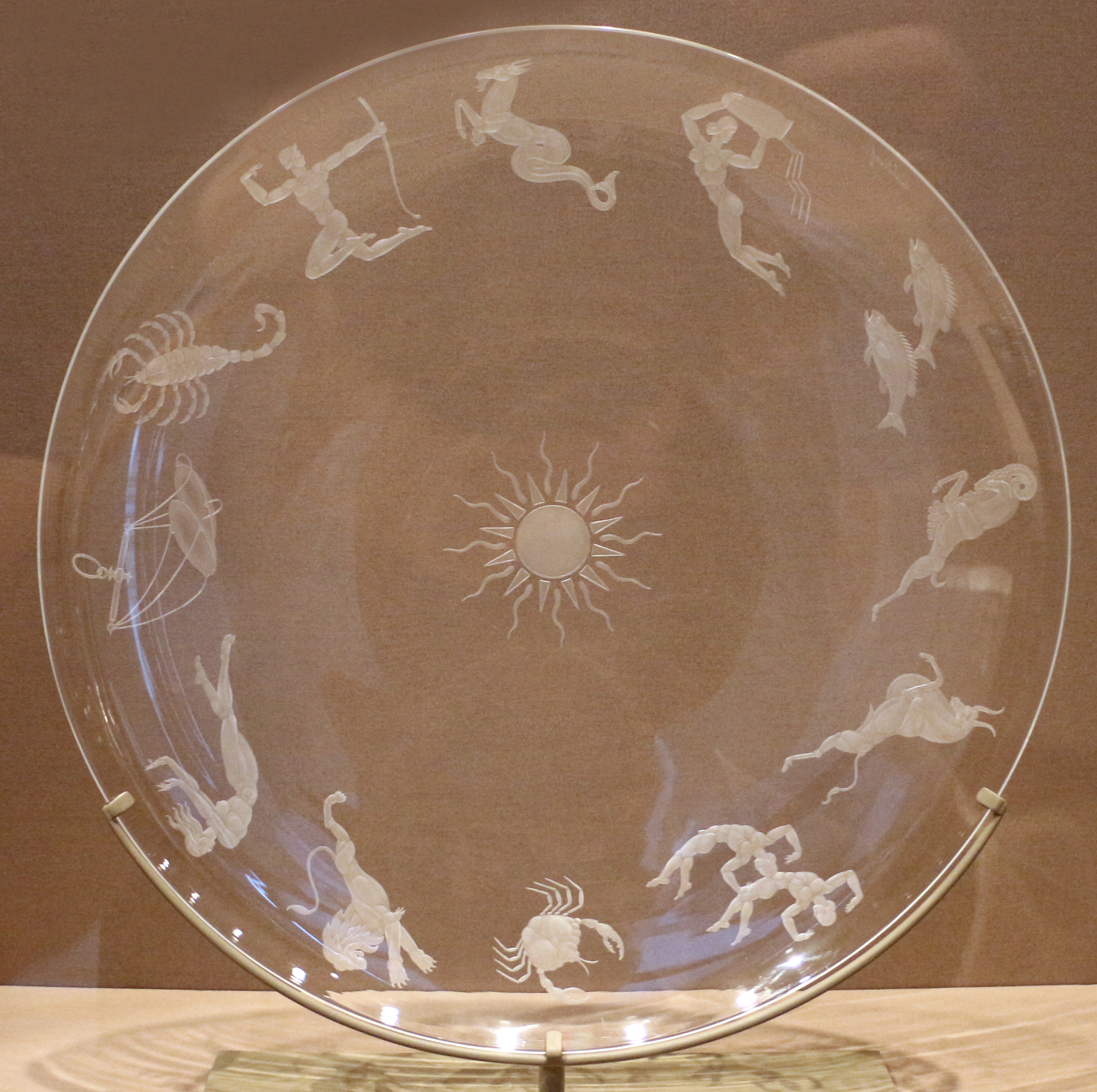
Zodiac Plate (1937) Sidney Waugh and Joseph Libisch (engraver) for Steuben Glass

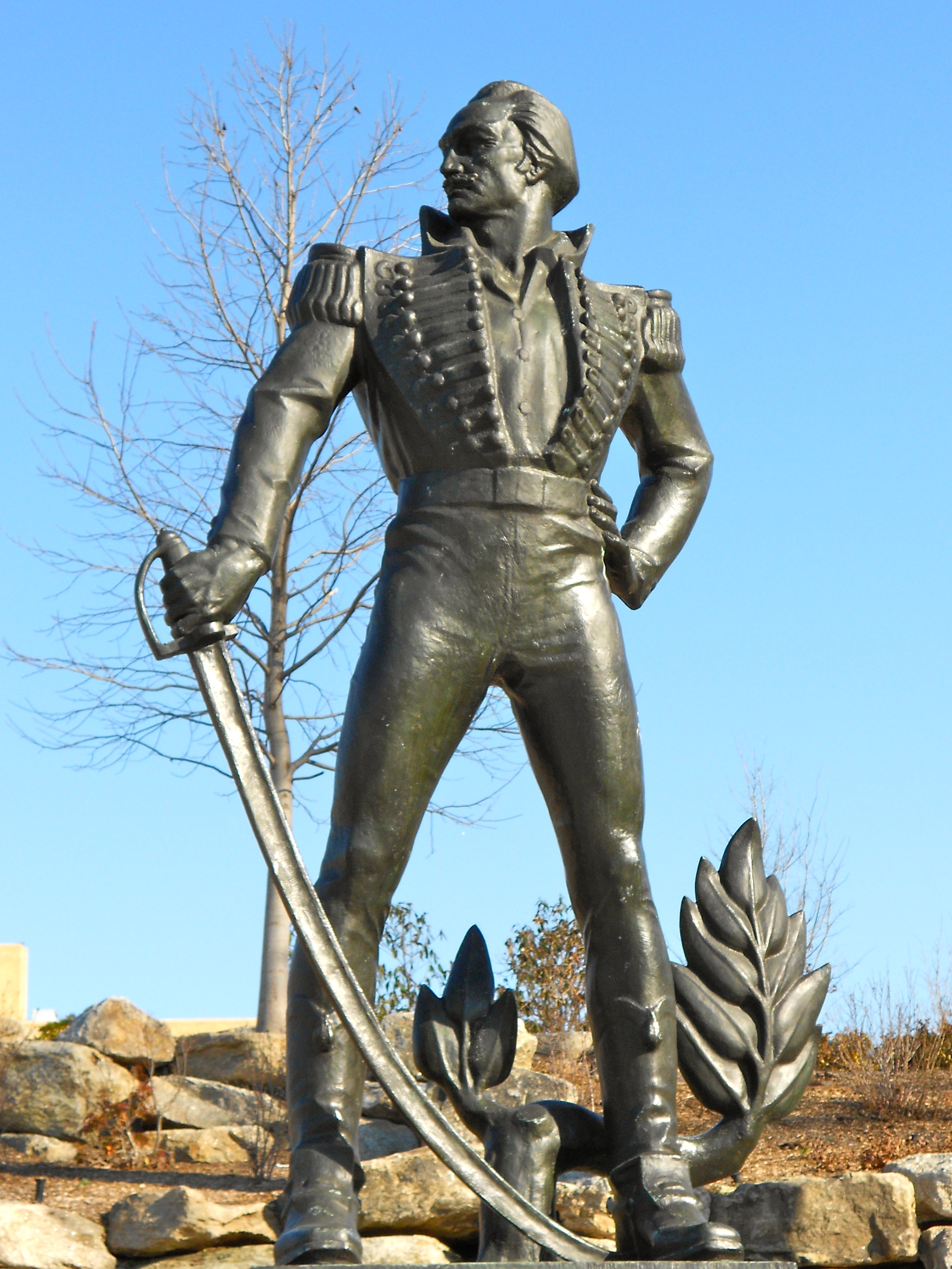
General Casimir Pulaski (1947), Fairmount Park, Philadelphia

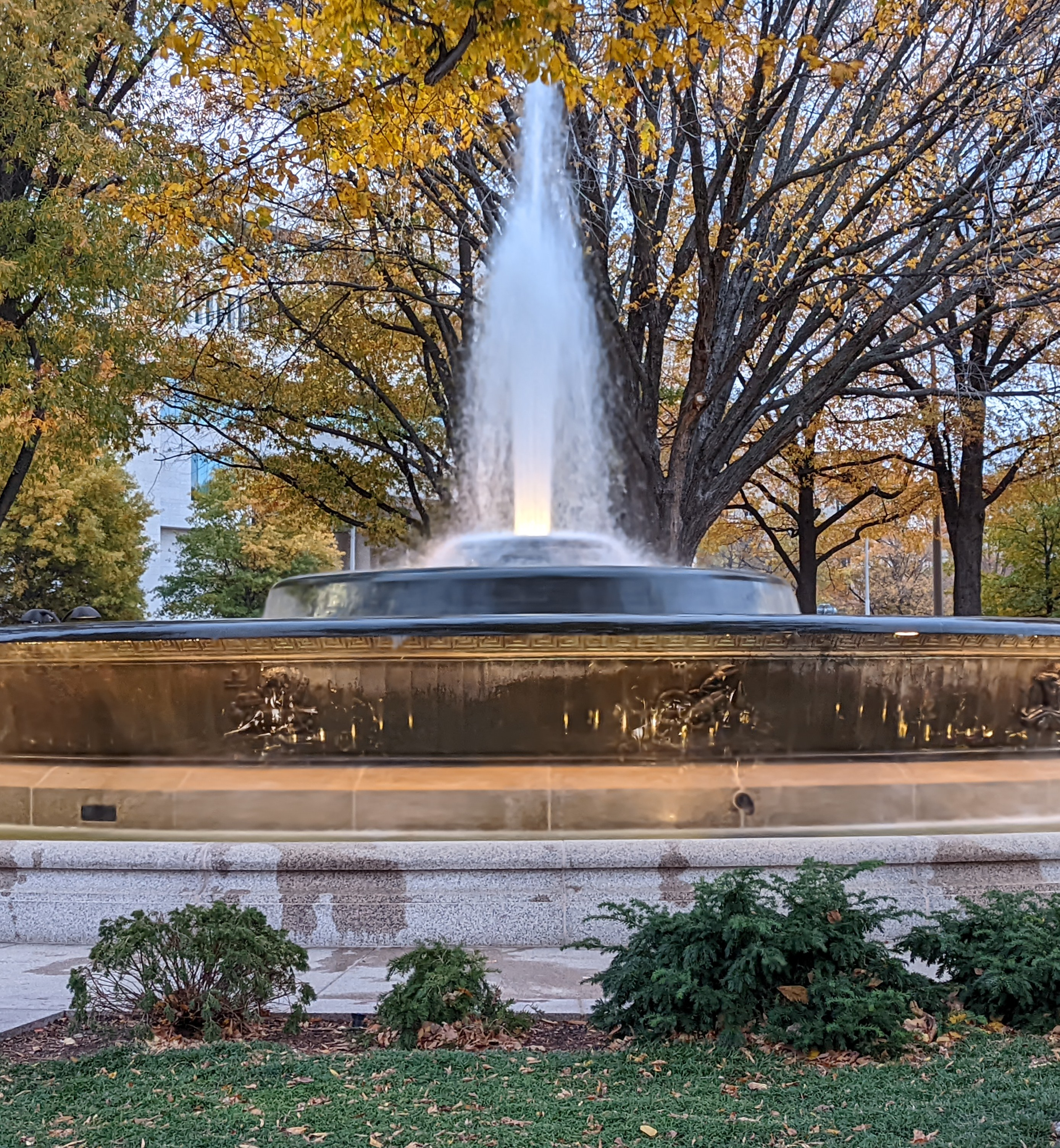
Andrew W. Mellon Memorial Fountain (1952)

=== Books ===
- The Art of Glass Making. New York: Dodd, Mead. 1938. OCLC 596085000 – via HathiTrust.
- The Making of Fine Glass. New York: Dodd, Mead. 1947. OCLC 684730229 – via HathiTrust.
