= Conrad L. Wirth =

American architect and conservationist (1899-1993)

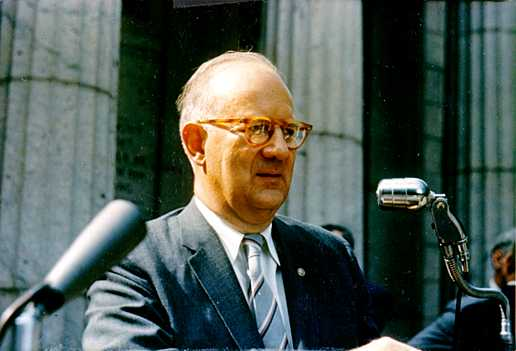

6th Director of the National Park Service
- In office December 9, 1951 – January 7, 1964
- President: Harry S. Truman; Dwight D. Eisenhower; John F. Kennedy; Lyndon B. Johnson
- Preceded by: Arthur E. Demaray
- Succeeded by: George B. Hartzog Jr.

Personal details
- Born: December 1, 1899 Hartford, Connecticut
- Died: July 25, 1993 (aged 93) Williamstown, Massachusetts
- Spouse: Helena Olson
- Children: Theodore J. Wirth; Peter Conrad Wirth
- Parents: Leonie Mense; Theodore Wirth
- Occupation: Landscape architect, conservationist

Conrad Louis Wirth (December 1, 1899 – July 25, 1993) was an American landscape architect, conservationist, and park service administrator. He was the longest-serving director of the National Park Service (NPS), serving from 1951 to 1964.

== Biography ==
Wirth was born in Hartford, Connecticut, where his father Theodore was park superintendent. Seven years later, Theodore moved to Minneapolis, Minnesota, where he became superintendent of the Minneapolis Park System. Conrad Wirth grew up in the Theodore Wirth House, the home built by the Park System for his father, surrounded by city park.

Conrad earned a Bachelor of Science degree in landscape gardening from Massachusetts Agricultural College (now the University of Massachusetts Amherst) and studied with Frank Waugh. He first came to the Washington, D.C., area to work for the National Capital Park and Planning Commission, and he joined the NPS in 1931. With the coming of the New Deal he supervised the service's Civilian Conservation Corps (CCC) program in the state parks. At that time, he hired Dorothy Waugh, Frank Waugh's daughter, to develop a manual with simplified diagrams and instructions for constructing basic park structures as many CCC participants could not interpret blueprints.

His administrative ability made him a successor to Director Arthur E. Demaray, whom he served as associate director before advancing to the top job in December 1951. Wirth's crowning achievement was Mission 66, a 10-year, billion-dollar program to upgrade park facilities and services by the 50th anniversary of the NPS in 1966. Wirth submitted his resignation to President John F. Kennedy in the fall of 1963 and left the directorship in early 1964, after recommending George B. Hartzog Jr. as his successor.

He went on to supervise the Interior Department's CCC program. A member of the National Geographic Society's Board of Trustees, he was also active in conservation and Park Service alumni affairs. He died in his sleep in 1993.

== Legacy ==
The M/V Conrad Wirth, a 25-car ferry was named for him. The 112-ft. vessel was built in 1970 for the North Carolina Department of Transportation Ferry Division to cross Hatteras Inlet between Hatteras and Ocracoke Islands on the outer banks of North Carolina.

Government offices
Preceded by Arthur E. Demaray	Director of the National Park Service; 1951–1964	Succeeded by George B. Hartzog Jr.
