= Margaret Maxfield =

American mathematician and author (1926–2016)

- Born: Margaret Alice Waugh; February 23, 1926; Willimantic, Connecticut, U.S.
- Died: December 20, 2016 (aged 90); Placerville, California, U.S.

Academic background
- Education: Oberlin College (B.A. 1948); University of Wisconsin (M.Sc. 1948); University of Oregon (PhD 1951)
- Thesis: Fermat's Theorem for Matrices over a Modular Ring (1951)
- Doctoral advisor: Ivan Niven

Academic work
- Discipline: Mathematics

Margaret Alice Waugh Maxfield (February 23, 1926 – December 20, 2016) was an American mathematician and mathematics book author.

== Education and personal life ==
Margaret Waugh was born on February 23, 1926, in Willimantic, Connecticut. Her father was agricultural economist Frederick V. Waugh and her grandfather was horticulturist Frank Albert Waugh.

She was active in the mathematics club at Oberlin College in the mid-1940s, and graduated from Oberlin in 1947. After earning a master's degree in 1948 from the University of Wisconsin, she completed her Ph.D. in 1951 at the University of Oregon. Her dissertation, Fermat's Theorem for Matrices over a Modular Ring, was supervised by Ivan M. Niven. In 1948 she had married John Edward Maxfield, another student at Wisconsin and the University of Oregon who became her frequent collaborator.

As students, both Maxfields visited the Naval Air Weapons Station China Lake, then known as the Naval Ordnance Test Station, in the summers. After completing their doctorates they worked at the station from 1951 until 1960, when John Maxfield took a succession of academic posts at the University of Florida, Kansas State University, and (beginning in 1981) at Louisiana Tech University. Margaret became and a professor of mathematics and statistics at Louisiana Tech, and a professor of business at Kansas State

By 2011 Maxfield had retired, but was still active in mathematics, and noted to her alumni magazine that she was using Wikipedia to find bibliographic material for her papers. She died on December 20, 2016, in Placerville, California.

== Contributions ==
While at the Naval Ordnance Test Station, Maxfield coauthored the book Statistics Manual: With Examples Taken from Ordnance Development, with Edwin L. Crow and Frances A. Davis. It was published by the station in 1955, and reprinted by Dover Books in 1960.

With John Maxfield, she was also the coauthor of Contemporary Mathematics for General Education: Algebra (Allyn and Bacon, 1963, also with S. Gould Sadler) Abstract Algebra and Solution By Radicals (W. B. Saunders, 1971; reprinted by Dover Books, 1992), Discovering Number Theory (W. B. Saunders, 1972), and Keys to Mathematics (W. B. Saunders, 1973)

Maxfield was one of the 1968 winners of the Lester R. Ford Award of the Mathematical Association of America for a paper with her father on the rational approximation of square roots.
