= Albert Waugh =

American economist and academic administrator (1903–1985)

Albert E. Waugh
- Born: September 28, 1902; Amherst, Massachusetts, US
- Died: March 6, 1985 (aged 82); Boston, Massachusetts, US
- Education: University of Massachusetts Amherst (B.S.); University of Connecticut (M.S.)
- Occupations: Economist, college professor, academic administrator
- Employer: University of Connecticut

Albert Edmund Waugh (September 28, 1902 — March 6, 1985) was an American economist and long-time academic administrator at the University of Connecticut (UConn) from 1924 to 1965. He served as provost from 1950 to 1965. Waugh's journal, which he kept daily from 1941 to 1974, gave unique insight into the history, academics, and life of the university and was an important primary source for historians such as Bruce M. Stave.

== Early life and education ==
Waugh was born on September 28, 1902, in Amherst, Massachusetts. He was the son of Mary (née Mary Vail) and Frank Albert Waugh. The latter was a University of Massachusetts Amherst landscape architect. His siblings were sculptor Sidney Waugh, agricultural economist Frederick V. Waugh, and illustrator Dorothy Waugh. Albert earned his Bachelor of Science degree in economics from the Massachusetts Agricultural College in 1924 and his Master of Science degree from the Connecticut Agricultural College in 1926. He attended Columbia University in 1925 and the University of Chicago in 1931–1932 and again in 1942–1943.

== Career ==
Waugh joined Connecticut Agricultural College as instructor of agricultural economics in 1924. He received promotions to assistant professor in 1928, associate professor in 1932, and professor in 1937. He served as head of the Department of Economics from 1939 to 1945, Dean of the College of Arts and Sciences from 1945 to 1950, and provost of the university from 1950 to 1965, when he retired after forty-one years of service.

During his tenure, Waugh served on numerous university committees, including scholastic standards, curricula and courses, and athletics. He served as a member of the University Senate, elected and ex-officio, during most of his years at the university. He was responsible for construction of the UConn Planetarium on North Eagleville Road in 1954. It is the oldest planetarium in the state. Waugh was also instrumental to launching UConn's early college experience program in 1956, making UConn the first in the nation to offer high school students the opportunity to take college courses in their high school settings. He dealt with numerous controversies during his time as provost, including McCarthyite campaigns against faculty.

Waugh was a member of the American Economic Society, the American Academy of Arts and Sciences, the American Association of University Professors, and Phi Kappa Phi. He served as a trustee of the Norwich State Hospital and the Windham Community Hospital and a director of the Willimantic Trust Company. He moderated Mansfield town meetings for more than forty years, beginning in 1941. In 1965, the Connecticut Republican Party selected him to attend the state's constitutional convention. Waugh served on the State Institutional Building Commission.

Waugh was a sundial enthusiast, described as a "world authority" on the subject by the Hartford Courant. He designed sundials at Mystic Seaport and other locations and wrote Sundials: Their Theory and Construction, published by Dover Publications in 1973. Waugh was the only American invited to join a German organization called "Friends of Old Clocks." He traveled to Europe four times to visit timekeepers there. In 1974, UConn dedicated in his honor a large sundial, garden, and quadrangle opposite the William Benton Museum of Art on UConn's Storrs campus.

Waugh published two textbooks: Elements of Statistical Method (1938), which was translated into Portuguese in 1946, and Principles of Economics (1947).

== Death ==
Waugh died on March 6, 1985, at Massachusetts General Hospital in Boston after a long illness. He was survived by his wife, Edith, and sons John Stewart Waugh, a chemistry professor at the Massachusetts Institute of Technology, and Robert Edmund Waugh, a physician and anesthesiologist who retired as medical director of the ambulatory surgery unit at New Britain General Hospital.
