= Frederick V. Waugh =

American economist (1898–1974)

Frederick Vail Waugh (1898–1974) was an American agricultural economist known for his work relating supply, demand, quality, and marketing in the prices of agricultural products, for his understanding of who benefits from volatility in agricultural pricing, and for his advocacy of food stamp and food distribution policies for the poor. He worked for the United States Department of Agriculture from the 1920s to the 1970s.

== Early life and education ==
Waugh the son of Mary (née Mary Vail) and Frank Albert Waugh. The latter was a professor of horticulture and landscape architecture at the Massachusetts Agricultural College (now the University of Massachusetts Amherst) and the namesake of the Frank A. Waugh Arboretum at the university. Waugh's siblings included Albert Waugh, a provost at the University of Connecticut (1950–1965); Dorothy Waugh, an artist, illustrator, and landscape architect; and sculptor Sidney Waugh. He enlisted in the United States Army Ambulance Service for World War I, and was awarded the Croix de Guerre for his service. After the war, he graduated from the Massachusetts Agricultural College in 1922. He earned a master's degree in 1924 from Rutgers University, became an instructor at the University of Connecticut in 1925, and completed a Ph.D. in 1929 at Columbia University.

== Recognition ==
Waugh is one of the namesakes of the Frisch–Waugh–Lovell theorem in econometrics.

He became a Fellow of the American Statistical Association in 1945, and a Fellow of the Econometric Society in 1947. In 1957, the Agricultural & Applied Economics Association named him as a fellow. In 1968, he and his daughter, mathematician Margaret Maxfield, won the Lester R. Ford Award of the Mathematical Association of America for a paper on the rational approximation of square roots.

A collection of Waugh's selected works was published by the University of Minnesota Press in 1984. His memorabilia from the Army Ambulance Service is collected in the University of Massachusetts Amherst library.
