= Arthur E. Demaray =

American politician (1887-1958)

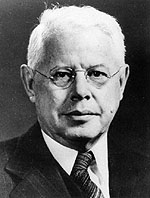
- Arthur E. Demaray

5th Director of the National Park Service
- In office April 1, 1951 – December 8, 1951
- President: Harry S. Truman
- Preceded by: Newton B. Drury
- Succeeded by: Conrad L. Wirth

Personal details
- Born: February 16, 1887; Washington, D.C.
- Died: August 19, 1958 (aged 71); Tucson, Arizona
- Occupation: Politician

Arthur Edward Demaray (February 16, 1887 – August 19, 1958) was an American administrator and, briefly, Director of the National Park Service.

A Washington, D.C., native, Demaray entered the government as a messenger at the age of 16, and worked his way through night school. He became a draftsman with the U.S. Geological Survey, where he testified effectively at Congressional and budget hearings and his writings stimulated park interest.

Demaray moved to the National Park Service (NPS) when its headquarters was first staffed in 1917. He served as associate director from 1933, and his brief tenure as Director (from April to December 1951), before his planned retirement, was a reward for his long and distinguished service. In the second spot during the tumultuous New Deal and the difficult wartime years (when he remained in Washington while the headquarters office relocated to Chicago), he proved an extremely effective administrator.

Perhaps his greatest accomplishment was to maintain good working relations with Secretary of the Interior Harold L. Ickes during the irascible secretary's 13-year regime (1933–1946). Demaray retired on December 8, 1951, to live in Tucson, Arizona. He died in 1958 at Tucson, Arizona.

Government offices
Preceded by Newton B. Drury	Director of the National Park Service; 1951	Succeeded by Conrad L. Wirth
