= Frank Albert Waugh =

American landscape architect (1869–1943)

Frank A. Waugh in 1926

Frank Albert Waugh (July 8, 1869 – March 20, 1943) was an American landscape architect whose career focused upon recreational uses of national forests, the production of a highly natural style of landscape design, and the implementation of ecology as a basis for choices in landscape design. He essentially pioneered the role of the landscape architect as an integral part of national forest design and development through such projects as the Mount Hood Scenic Byway and the Bryce Canyon scenic roadway. His ideas spread via his diverse writings, including Recreation Uses in the National Forests and The Natural Style in Landscape Gardening. He also wrote prolifically about education, agriculture, and social issues in such works as The Agricultural College and Rural Improvement.

== Biography ==
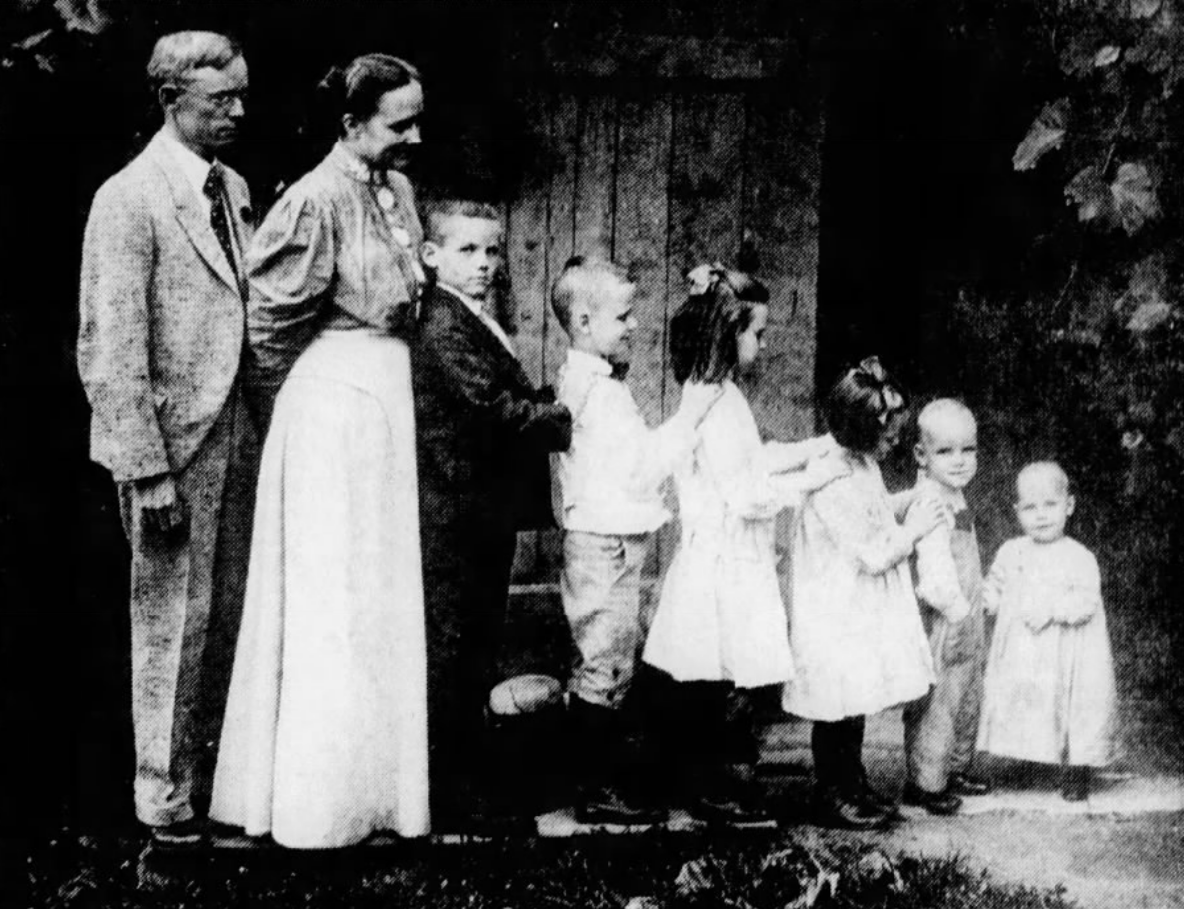
The Waugh family in 1905; Frank is on the left.

Frank A. Waugh was born in Sheboygan Falls, Wisconsin, but his studies and career would take him far from his birthplace. Waugh earned his B.S. degree in 1891 from Kansas State Agricultural College and a subsequent M.S. from Oklahoma State Agricultural and Mechanical College in 1893. He worked in the newspaper business in Topeka, Kansas, Helena, Montana, and Denver, Colorado. In 1895, graduate studies in landscape architecture and horticulture would take him to Cornell University, Europe, and finally to the University of Vermont. He found his way to the Massachusetts Agricultural College, now the University of Massachusetts Amherst, where he became the head of the agriculture division and founded an undergraduate landscape gardening program in 1903, only the second program of its kind in the United States. He was one of the first practitioners to formally recognize American landscape architecture history.

His son, Frederick V. Waugh, became a notable agricultural economist and his granddaughter, Margaret Maxfield, became a notable mathematician. His other children included Albert Waugh, a provost at the University of Connecticut (1950–1965); Dorothy Waugh, an artist, illustrator, and landscape architect; and sculptor Sidney Waugh.

== Accomplishments ==
Frank Waugh's Book of Landscape Gardening has become a classic in its field. Waugh begins each edition of his text with the sentence: “Landscape gardening is eminently a fine art.” He covers general principles of design and discusses three basic styles – the natural, the architectural and the picturesque. The book was praised for achieving “a balance between well-known period examples and solutions” which was achievable by all who attempted them. The photographs included in the book, taken by Waugh, are landscapes – ranging from Europe and Japan to unique regions in the United States. In his text, Waugh also includes several plant lists of the regional foliage. Waugh was an avid writer of magazine articles and books with writings on technical horticulture (Systematic pomology, 1903), landscape architecture (Formal Design In Landscape Architecture, 1927), education (The Agricultural College, 1916), gardening (Everybody’s Garden, 1937), and society (Rural Improvement, 1914).

In 1917, Waugh was hired by the U.S. Forest Service as a consultant for the recreational development of national forests. Over a five-month period, he visited forests across the country and evaluated their facilities, both private and public, including camp and picnic grounds, summer resorts, and other aspects of forest recreation. Most importantly, he compared the value of forest recreation to that of the urban realm, estimating that forest recreation was worth $7.5 million annually, roughly equal to the value of urban recreation. He published his findings in Recreation Uses in the National Forests, which was the first comprehensive study of national forest recreational use.

Another major project that Waugh embarked upon was the design of the little town of Grand Canyon Village that bordered one of the natural wonders of the world and a vital U.S. national monument, the Grand Canyon of Arizona. The town consisted of 300 to 400 people and, at the time, a tourist population of about 200 annually. In the design, Waugh realized that the purpose of this town was to provide for the tourists who came to see this great wonder. He believed that yellow pines should be saved and that the piñon and cedar that were planted along streets should be removed. By creating a scattered canopy by taking away the formality in the trees, Waugh believed it would unify the natural and undomesticated surroundings with the overall presentation of the town.

== Influences ==
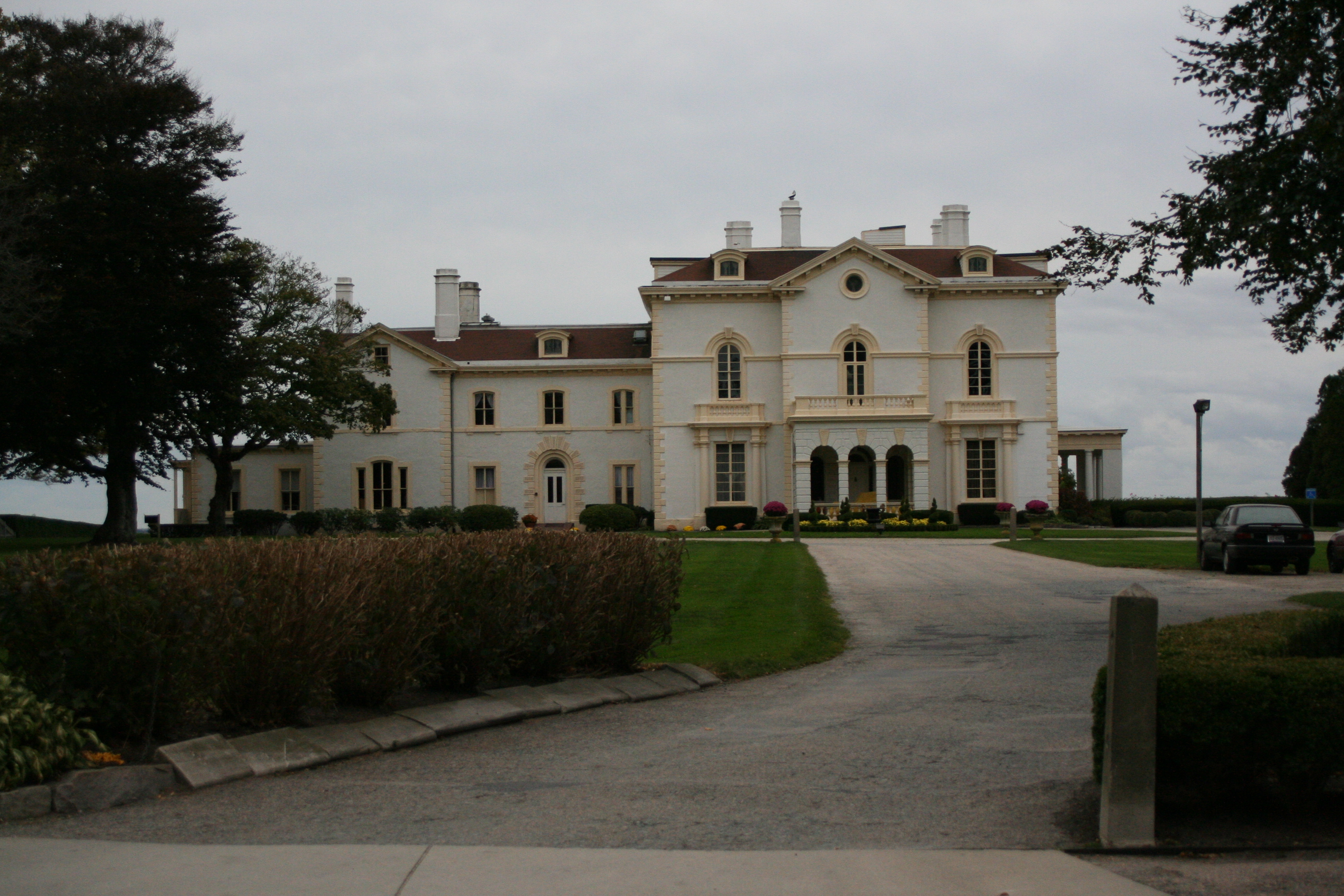
Beechwood, co-designed by Waugh mentor Andrew Jackson Downing, was once an Astor family mansion and is now a historic house museum in Newport, Rhode Island.

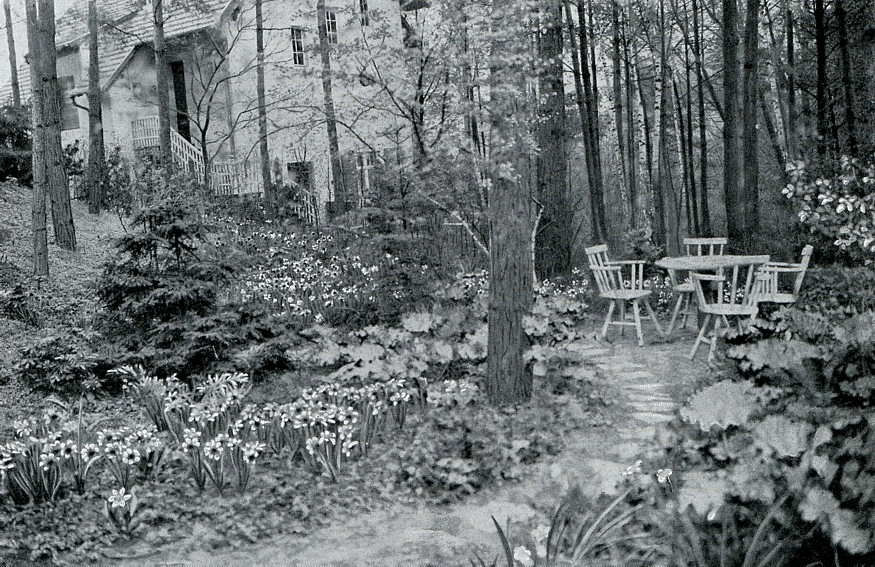
A circa-1920 garden in the Berlin-Wannsee area, designed by Willy Lange, who also influenced Waugh.

Social movements of the time had a significant effect on the life and career of Frank Waugh. During the Civil War era, the concept of preserving natural monuments became prominent. This movement began with a grant from Congress on June 30, 1864, for the preservation of Yosemite Valley and the Mariposa Grove of Big Trees. Primarily chosen for their natural scenic qualities, these new national parks served as the first precedents for the early twentieth century trend in reserving scenic wild lands for public use, in which Frank Waugh was influential.

In 1917, Waugh published The Natural Style in Landscape Gardening, which was based on the imitation of natural forms and the use of native vegetation in landscaping. His advocacy for this style can be traced back to Andrew Jackson Downing, who had heavily influenced Waugh. Downing held native plants in high regard and spoke of their potential to recreate the scenery of the wilderness, thus contributing to an appreciation of America's native plants. Another influence was Frederick Law Olmsted, a contemporary of Downing whose use of native species in mass plantings at Biltmore, the Vanderbilt estate near Asheville, North Carolina, in 1890 began a trend characterized by the use of native plants in preference to exotics among landscape designers. Downing's designs were also based on the principle of vistas. Waugh's scenic byway designs for Bryce Canyon and Mount Hood represent this principle. These byways feature “paragraphic” vistas which appear sequentially at turns along the road, accompanied by turn-offs for stopping and taking in the view.

Waugh's designs also incorporated the concept of ecology through the use of plantings characterized by natural association of plant species, in conjunction with environmental conditions. Having studied in Germany, Waugh was influenced by such Germans as Willy Lange, whom Waugh credited with the best explanation of ecological principles. Additionally, the curator and the planting foreman of the Berlin-Dahlem Botanical Garden, Dr. Adolf Engler and Dr. K. Peters, used mass plantings in response to soil and drainage. Waugh's designs were driven by these developments in vegetation use, which he believed were essential to the character of his natural style. It is no wonder that he developed a taste for native vegetation and natural scenery, considering that these elements coincided with the concept of a place's ecological scheme and overall spirit. Another conceptual requirement for Waugh's naturalistic style of gardening was the open lawn. He believed that they were the natural foundation for a natural landscape. With English influences such as the large estate garden at Stowe in England, the wide-open lawn reigned supreme, implying the values of naturalistic landscaping through little manipulation of planting arrangements and circulation patterns. The influence of the emphasis on the lawn can be seen throughout America, and although it may have lost most of the naturalistic symbolism behind it, the "great American lawn" continues to be popular today.

Although Frank Waugh was known as a naturalistic designer, his book Formal Design in Landscape Architecture exemplifies his thorough knowledge and understanding of the formal style of garden design. He believed that there are settings which require the strict guidelines of formal garden design and that certain sites call for loose, naturalistic design concepts. Formal design, in the eyes of Waugh, requires all the parts of the garden to be symmetrically balanced. This is not to say that informal gardening is not balanced, but it lacks the formality of bilateral symmetry and radial symmetry that the formal garden design strictly abides by.

== Significance ==
Ultimately, Waugh was a pioneer in landscape architecture, in that he recognized the role of landscape architects as integral in the development of national forests and parklands and their roads, trails, campgrounds, and picnic spots. This was especially influential in terms of the national forests, whose uses prior to 1917 were primarily characterized by timber production and livestock grazing. Along with his contemporary Henry Vincent Hubbard, Waugh fostered the creation of a landscape design style that was uniquely American. His writings of an ecological approach to design were unique as well and rather unprecedented in terms of American literature. Furthermore, his extensive study and publications of mass plantings laid a philosophical and practical foundation for naturalized landscape design, as might be expressed today through re-vegetation practices.

Waugh retired from teaching in 1939, just four years before his death. In addition to his endeavors in national forest design, he also designed college campuses, including Kansas State University and Oklahoma State University. He also made detailed etchings of nature scenes and played the flute daily. He and his wife, Alice, had six children. Many of them achieved great successes, including such accomplishments as designing public sculptures in Washington D.C. and inventing the United States federal food stamp program. Although he was a man of small physical stature, being just over five feet tall, his charisma was widely felt and influenced his family, colleagues, and students alike. His achievements and influence were very much driven by his overall impression of place. Waugh's designs and writings constantly hearkened back to this concept, and consequently, he urged the landscape architect to, “first and foremost, endeavor to understand the spirit of his landscapes.” (from Waugh's The Natural Style in Landscape Gardening)

== Timeline ==
- July 8, 1869 – Born in Sheboygan Falls, Wisconsin
- 1891 – Receives B.S. from Kansas State College
- 1893 – Accepts position at the State Agricultural College of the University of Vermont as professor of horticulture
- 1895 - Moved to New England from his native Midwest
- 1903 - Waugh founds an undergraduate program in “landscape gardening” at Massachusetts Agricultural College, only the second program in the nation
- 1917 - U.S. Forest Service hires Frank Waugh to work on the first comprehensive national study of recreation uses; he spends five months in the field during 1917 working on his National Forest Study
- 1918 - Developed A Plan for Grand Canyon Village
- 1918-1919 - Waugh served as a captain in the U.S. Army
- 1920 - Designed Oregon's famous Mount Hood drive
- 1922 - U.S. Forest Service hires Frank Waugh as a collaborator again; he spends the summer formulating plans for the development of public camp grounds and summer-home sites in the National Forests of Colorado, Wyoming, Idaho, Utah, Idaho and other western states
- 1923 - Students could obtain a bachelor's, master's or two-year technical degree from his program
- 1926 – Ends consultation for U.S. Forest Service
- 1934 - Reported to the American Society of Landscape Architects that in the previous 17 years, the department of landscape gardening had 217 graduates, with 20 of them women
- 1939 - Retired from teaching
- March 20, 1943 – Frank Waugh dies, age 73

== Publications ==
- 1898: Notes on Horticultural Nomenclature: Some suggestions for the nurseryman, fruit grower, gardener, seed grower, plant breeder and student of horticulture. New York: American Gardening, 26 pages.
- 1898, 1911, 1913: Kemp's Landscape Gardening: How to lay out a garden. New York: John Wiley & Sons, 292 pages. – Originally written by Edward Kemp, this work was edited, revised and adapted to North America by F. A. Waugh.
- 1901, 1912: Plums and Plum Culture: A Monograph of the Plums Cultivated and Indigenous in North America, with a Complete Account of Their Propagation, Cultivation and Utilization. New York: Orange Judd Co., 371 pages.
- 1903: Systematic Pomology
- 1909: "The Foundation of Good Gardening." Woman's Home Companion April 1909.
- 1910: The Landscape Beautiful: A study of the utility of the natural landscape, its relation to human life and happiness, with the application of these principles in landscape gardening, and in art in general. New York: Orange Judd Co., 336 pages.
- 1912: Beginner’s Guide to Fruit Growing: A simple statement of the elementary practices of propagation, planting, culture, fertilization, pruning, spraying, etc. New York: Orange Judd Co., 120 pages.
- 1913: The American Peach Orchard
- 1914: Country Roads and Their Benefits
- 1914: Rural Improvement: The principles of civic art applied to rural conditions including village improvement and the betterment of the open country. New York: Orange Judd Co., 265 pages.
- 1915: All Kinds of Roads
- 1915: How Wide is a Road?
- 1916: The Agricultural College
- 1916: Fruit Trees in Public Roadways
- 1917: The Natural Style in Landscape Gardening. Toronto: Copp Clark Co., 151 pages.
- 1917: Outdoor Theaters: The design, construction and use of open-air auditoriums. Toronto: Copp Clark Co., 151 pages.
- 1917: Recreation Uses in the National Forests
- 1918: A Plan for the Development of the Village of Grand Canyon, Ariz. U.S. Department of Agriculture, Forest Service, 23 pages.
- 1918: Engineering in the National Forests
- 1920: Public Roads, Our Great National Park
- 1921: Downing’s Landscape Gardening. New York: John Wiley & Sons, 439 pages. – Originally written by Andrew Jackson Downing, this work was revised by F. A. Waugh.
- 1922: Textbook of Landscape Gardening: Designed especially for the use of non-professional students. New York: John Wiley & Sons, 344 pages.
- 1924: Country Planning
- 1925: "American Ideals in Landscape Architecture." Landscape Architecture XV:3 (April 1925).
- 1927: Formal Design in Landscape Architecture: A statement of principles with special reference to their present use in America. New York: Orange Judd Co., 191 pages.
- 1937: Everybody's Garden

== Works cited ==
- Crewe, Katherine. "The Rural Landscapes of Frank Waugh." Landscape Journal 22:1-03 (2003): 126-39.
- Havlick, David G. "Frank A. Waugh." USFS History - Forest History Society. 2 Nov. 2004. Forest History Society. 23 Oct. 2006 <http://www.lib.duke.edu/forest/Research/usfscoll/people/Waugh/Waugh.html >.
- McClelland, Linda F. "Book of Landscape Gardening." UMass Amherst: University of Massachusetts Amherst Press. 2001. University of Massachusetts Amherst Amherst. 23 Oct. 2006 <https://web.archive.org/web/20080513133326/http://www.umass.edu/umpress/fall_05/waugh.html>.
- McClelland, Linda F. Presenting Nature: The Historic Landscape Design of the National Park Service, 1916 to 1942. 1993. 23 Oct. 2006 <http://www.cr.nps.gov/history/online_books/mcclelland/mcclelland.htm >.
- Waugh, Frank A. 1913. Landscape Gardening. Orange Judd Company, New York, New York. pages 15–26.
- Waugh, Frank A. 1918. A Plan for the Development of the Village of Grand Canyon, Aiz. U.S. Department of Agriculture Fores Service.
- Waugh, Frank A. 1927. Formal Design In Landscape Architecture. Orange Judd Publishing Company, Inc, New York, New York. Pages 15–26.
- Whitaker, Jan. "The Landscape Beautiful: 100 years later, the spirit & art of Frank Waugh live on." UMass Magazine Online. 2003. University of Massachusetts Amherst Amherst. 23 Oct. 2006 <http://www.umassmag.com/Winter_2003/The_Landscape_Beautiful_413.html>.
