= Newton B. Drury =

American National Park Service director (1889–1978)

Newton Drury
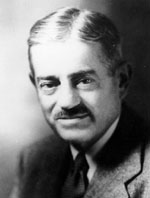

4th Director of the National Park Service
- In office August 20, 1940 – March 31, 1951
- President: Franklin D. Roosevelt; Harry S. Truman
- Preceded by: Arno B. Cammerer
- Succeeded by: Arthur E. Demaray

Personal details
- Born: Newton Bishop Drury; April 9, 1889 San Francisco, California
- Died: December 14, 1978 (aged 89) Berkeley, California
- Occupation: Advertising, politician

Newton Bishop Drury (April 9, 1889 – December 14, 1978) was the fourth director of the American National Park Service and the executive director of the Save the Redwoods League.

== Early life ==
Newton was born in 1889 in San Francisco, California. He attended Lowell High School, as well as the University of California, Berkeley, where he graduated in 1912. There, he befriended fellow future director of the national park service Horace M. Albright and future United States Supreme Court Chief Justice Earl Warren. He served in the U.S. Army Balloon Corps in World War I. The destruction that he witnessed motivated him strongly towards conservation.

== Career ==
In 1919, he and his brother Aubrey formed the Drury Brothers Company, an advertising and public relations agency. That same year, the organizers of the Save the Redwoods League, many of whom knew Drury from the university, asked Drury Brothers to manage the League. Newton Drury became executive secretary in charge of publicity and fundraising, a position he held for twenty years. Drury and the league obtained a six-million dollar bond measure passed to buy California redwood groves.

=== National Park Service ===
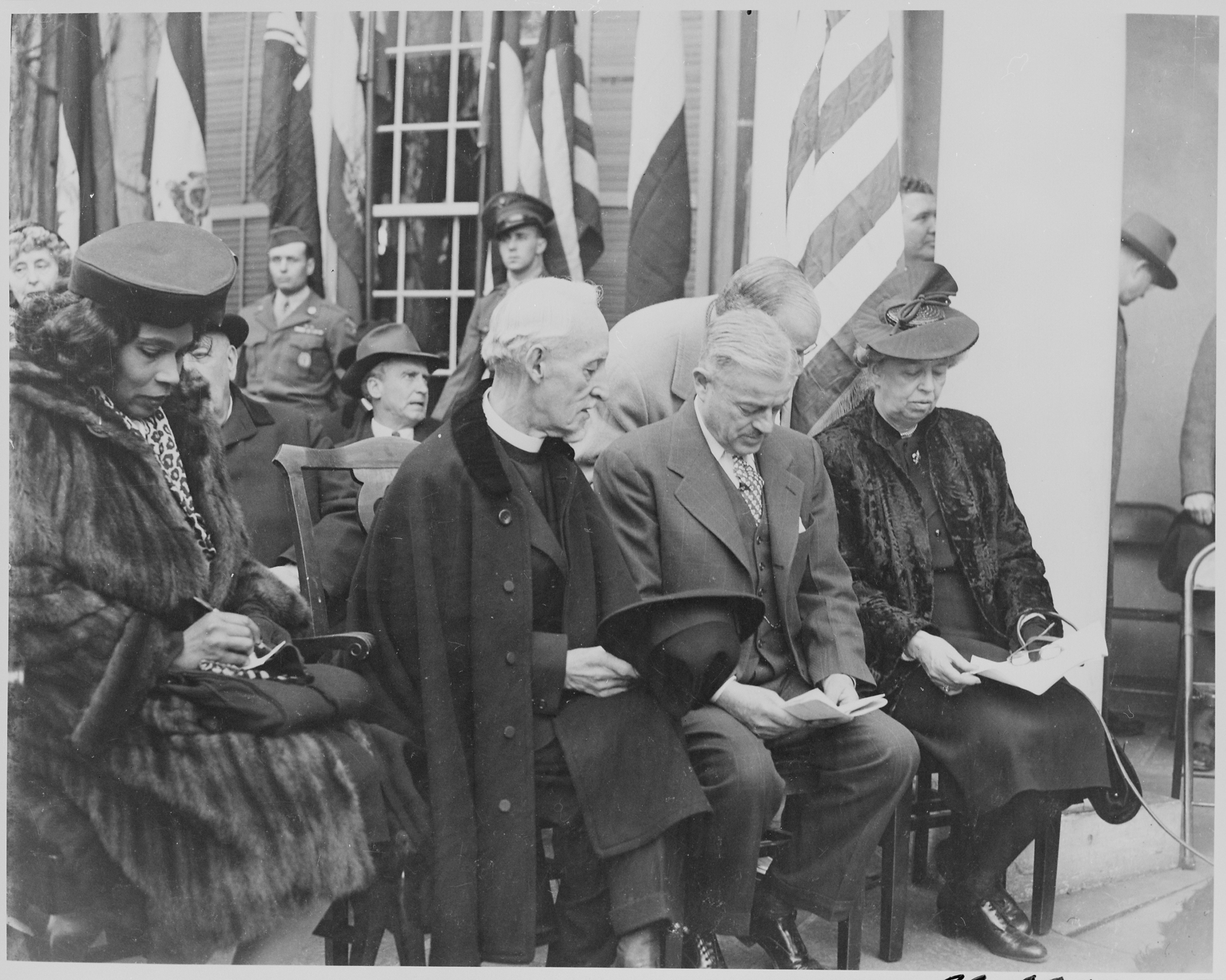
Drury with Eleanor Roosevelt at the dedication of Franklin D. Roosevelt's home at Hyde Park, New York, as a national shrine in 1946

Drury declined appointment as NPS Director in 1933, but accepted the job in 1940 when offered by his friend, Governor Earl Warren. He was the first director without prior national park responsibilities, but came with strong conservationist credentials, having served as executive secretary of the Save the Redwoods League in California. During World War II he successfully resisted most demands for consumptive uses of park resources. Less eager than his predecessors to expand the park system, he opposed NPS involvement with areas he judged not to meet national park standards. Differences with Secretary of the Interior Oscar L. Chapman over Chapman's support for dams in Dinosaur National Monument contributed to Drury's resignation in 1951.

After his resignation from the park service Drury accepted the position as head of the California Division of Beaches and Parks. He was instrumental in changing some of the operational policies of the state park system to that similar to the national park system. In particular, he dropped the recreational emphasis in summer programming to that of interpretation with a natural history emphasis.

== Death ==
Drury died in December 1978. He received a Pugsley Medal twice, a silver medal in 1940 and a gold medal in 1950. In 1945 he received the Garden Club of America's Frances K. Hutchinson Medal. He was board chairman of the Save the Redwoods League at his death.

=== Legacy ===
The Newton B. Drury Scenic Parkway is the 10-mile (16 km) long two-lane road through Prairie Creek Redwoods State Park in Humboldt County, California, named to honor his efforts in the creation of Redwood National and State Parks. This road had formerly been the route of US Route 101. Though shorter in distance, it is similar in quality to the Avenue of the Giants in Southern Humboldt County. As a result of constructing a new route, completed in 1993, for US Route 101 outside the eastern edge of the park, main traffic along US Route 101 is diverted from going through Prairie Creek Redwoods State Park, and old growth redwoods within the park will not ever be required to be removed to widen the road. Drury Peak in the Mount San Jacinto State Park, Riverside County, California, is named after him as well.

Government offices
| Preceded by Arno B. Cammerer | Director of the National Park Service; 1940–1951 | Succeeded by Arthur E. Demaray |
