= Arno B. Cammerer =

American politician (1883–1941)

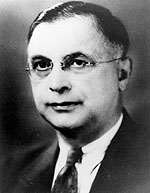

3rd Director of the National Park Service
- In office August 10, 1933 – August 9, 1940
- President: Franklin D. Roosevelt
- Preceded by: Horace M. Albright
- Succeeded by: Newton B. Drury

Personal details
- Born: July 31, 1883 Arapahoe, Nebraska
- Died: April 30, 1941 (aged 57) Arlington, Virginia
- Occupation: Politician

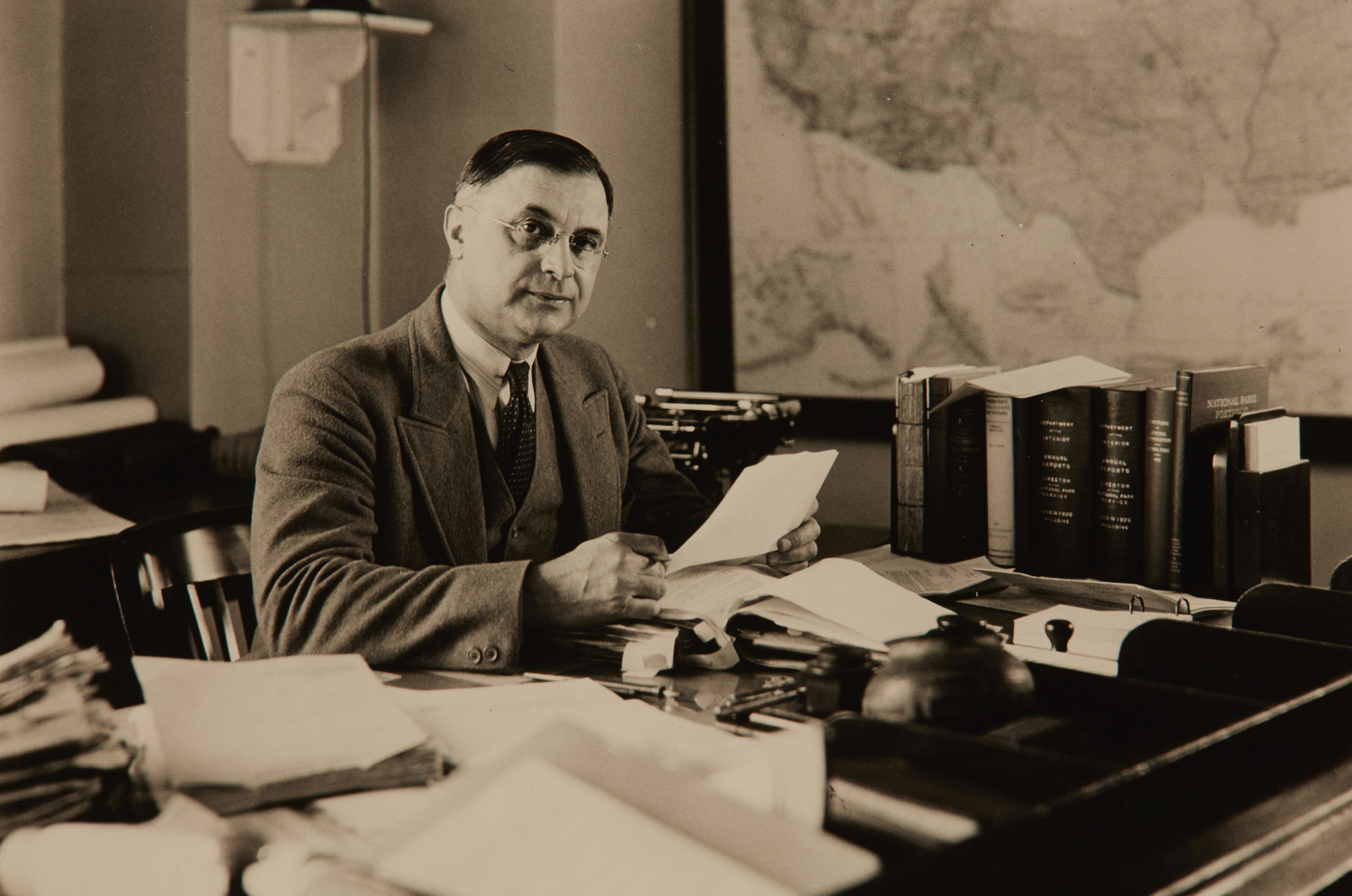
Arno Cammerer sitting in his office.

Arno Berthold Cammerer (July 31, 1883 – April 30, 1941) was the third director of the U.S. National Park Service.

== Early life ==
Cammerer was born in Arapahoe, Nebraska, in 1883. He was the son of a Lutheran pastor and his wife. He moved to Washington, D.C. in 1904 to work as a civil service bookkeeper, and earned a Bachelor of Law degree at Georgetown Law School in 1911.

== Career ==
Cammerer was working as the Executive Secretary of the Fine Arts Commission in Washington, DC, which reviewed agency projects in the capital against design guidelines and aesthetic issues. The U.S. National Park Service's first director, Stephen Mather, had encountered Cammerer at the commission and recognized his competence as executive secretary. He appointed Cammerer as assistant director in 1919, replacing previous assistant director Horace M. Albright, who then became Director. Cammerer served as Mather's right-hand man in Washington and acted for him in his frequent absences over the next decade. After the project to found Great Smoky Mountains National Park proved expensive, Cammerer secured a promise from John D. Rockefeller Jr., to match $5 million in the acquisition of Shenandoah National Park lands. He advanced to the new rank of associate director on January 12, 1929.

== Directorship of the U.S. National Park Service ==
Cammerer succeeded Albright as director on August 10, 1933, the same day as the transfer to the National Park Service of the national capitol parks, historic sites, memorials, and monuments from the War and Agriculture departments. Under his leadership, the NPS tripled the number of areas served, increased visitations from two to 16 million, became involved with recreational area planning and management, began to survey and record historic sites and buildings outside the existing parks, and worked with Congress to pass the Historic Sites Act, as well as a law establishing the National Park Foundation.

In 1938, Cammerer received the Pugsley Gold Medal. The Pugsley Award recognizes outstanding contributions to the promotion and development of public parks in the United States and is given out by the American Academy of Park and Recreation Administrators along with the National Park Foundation.

Strained relations with Secretary of the Interior Harold L. Ickes impaired Cammerer's effectiveness and health; he stepped down in 1940 following a heart attack the previous year. He became the service's eastern regional director.

== Death and legacy ==
After suffering another heart attack, Cammerer died on April 30, 1941. The official NPS biography says that "Cammerer's contributions to the National Park Service were legion."

Mount Cammerer, on the Northeastern fringe of the Great Smoky Mountains is named for Cammerer, as he had played a prominent role in the acquisition of the park.

Government offices
Preceded by Horace M. Albright	Director of the National Park Service; 1933–1940	Succeeded by Newton B. Drury
