= History of Minneapolis =

History of a US city

Minneapolis is the largest city by population in the U.S. state of Minnesota, and the county seat of Hennepin County. The origin and growth of the city was spurred by the proximity of Fort Snelling, the first major United States military presence in the area, and by its location on Saint Anthony Falls, which provided power for sawmills and flour mills.

Construction of Fort Snelling began in 1819, near the confluence of the Mississippi and Minnesota rivers. A lumber mill and a grist mill were built at Saint Anthony Falls in 1822 to supply the fort. Saint Anthony was established on the east bank in the 1840s, while Minneapolis developed on the west bank later; Minneapolis was incorporated as a city in 1866. The two towns later merged into one city in 1872.

Early development focused on sawmills, but flour mills eventually became the dominant industry. The growth of the milling industry contributed to the expansion of transportation, banking, and commercial institutions, including the Minneapolis Grain Exchange. Through innovations in milling and the growth of its flour-milling industry, Minneapolis became a leading center of flour production and became known as the "Mill City". As the city grew, its cultural institutions developed alongside the University of Minnesota and a renowned park system shaped by figures including Horace Cleveland and, later, Theodore Wirth.

Although the sawmills and the flour mills are long gone, Minneapolis remains a regional center in banking and industry. The two largest milling companies, General Mills and the Pillsbury Company, now merged under the General Mills name, still remain prominent in the Twin Cities area. The city has rediscovered the riverfront, which now hosts parkland, the Mill City Museum, and the Guthrie Theater.

== Early European exploration ==
Minneapolis grew up around Saint Anthony Falls, the only waterfall on the Mississippi River and the end of the commercially navigable section of the river until locks were installed in the 1960s.

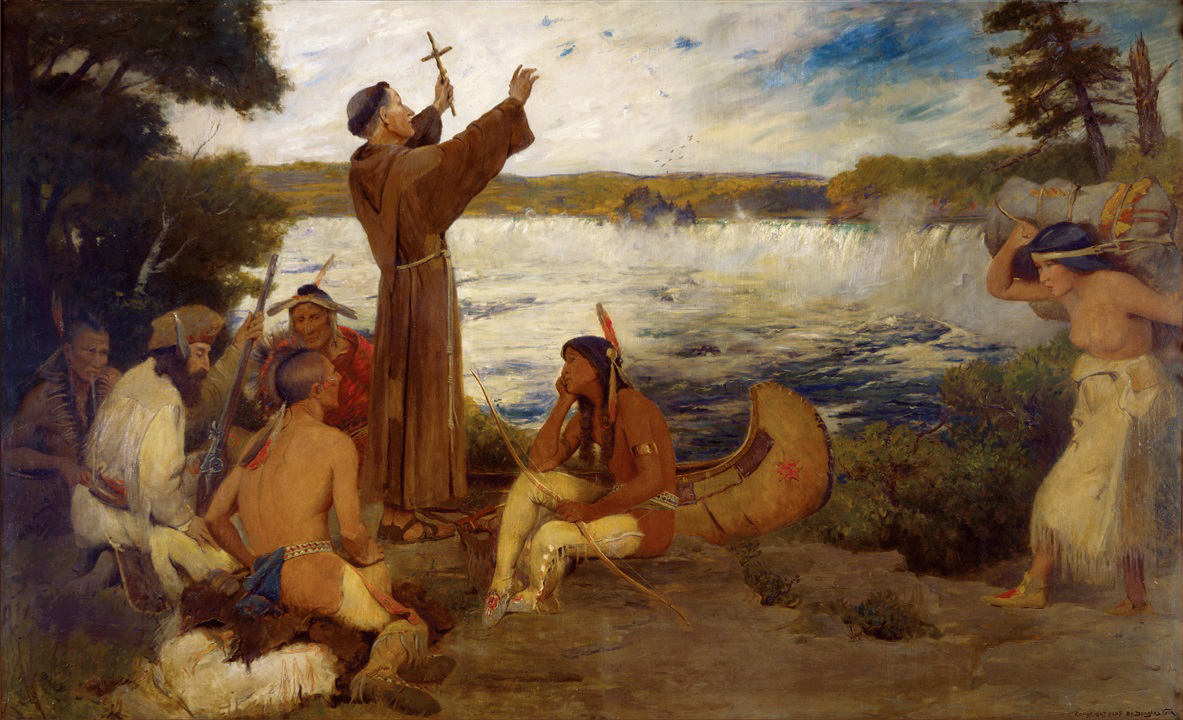
A painting of Father Hennepin discovering Saint Anthony Falls.

French explorer Daniel Greysolon, Sieur du Lhut explored the Minnesota area in 1680 on a mission to extend French dominance over the area. While exploring the St. Croix River area, he got word that some other explorers had been held captive. He arranged for their release. The prisoners included Michel Aco, Antoine Auguelle, and Father Louis Hennepin, a Catholic priest and missionary. On that expedition, Father Hennepin explored the falls and named them after his patron saint, Anthony of Padua. He published a book in 1683 entitled Description of Louisiana, describing the area to interested Europeans. As time went on, he developed a tendency to exaggerate. A 1691 edition of the book described the falls as having a drop of fifty or sixty feet, when they only had a drop of 16 feet (4.9 m). Hennepin may have been including nearby rapids in his estimate, as the current total drop in river level over the series of dams is 76 ft (23 m).

=== United States' acquisition ===
The city's land was acquired by the United States in a series of treaties and purchases negotiated with the Mdewakanton band of the Dakota and separately with European nations. England claimed the land east of the Mississippi and France, then Spain, and again France claimed the land west of the river. In 1787 land on the east side of the river became part of the Northwest Territory and in 1803 the west side became part of the Louisiana Purchase, both claimed by the United States. In 1805, Zebulon Pike purchased two tracts of land from the Dakota Indians. One tract was located at the mouth of the St. Croix River, while a second, larger tract ran from the confluence of the Minnesota and Mississippi Rivers to St. Anthony Falls, with a width of nine miles (14 km) east and west of the river. In return, he distributed about $200 in trading goods and sixty gallons of liquor, and promised a further payment from the United States government. The United States Senate eventually approved a payment of $2,000.

== Fort Snelling and St. Anthony Falls ==
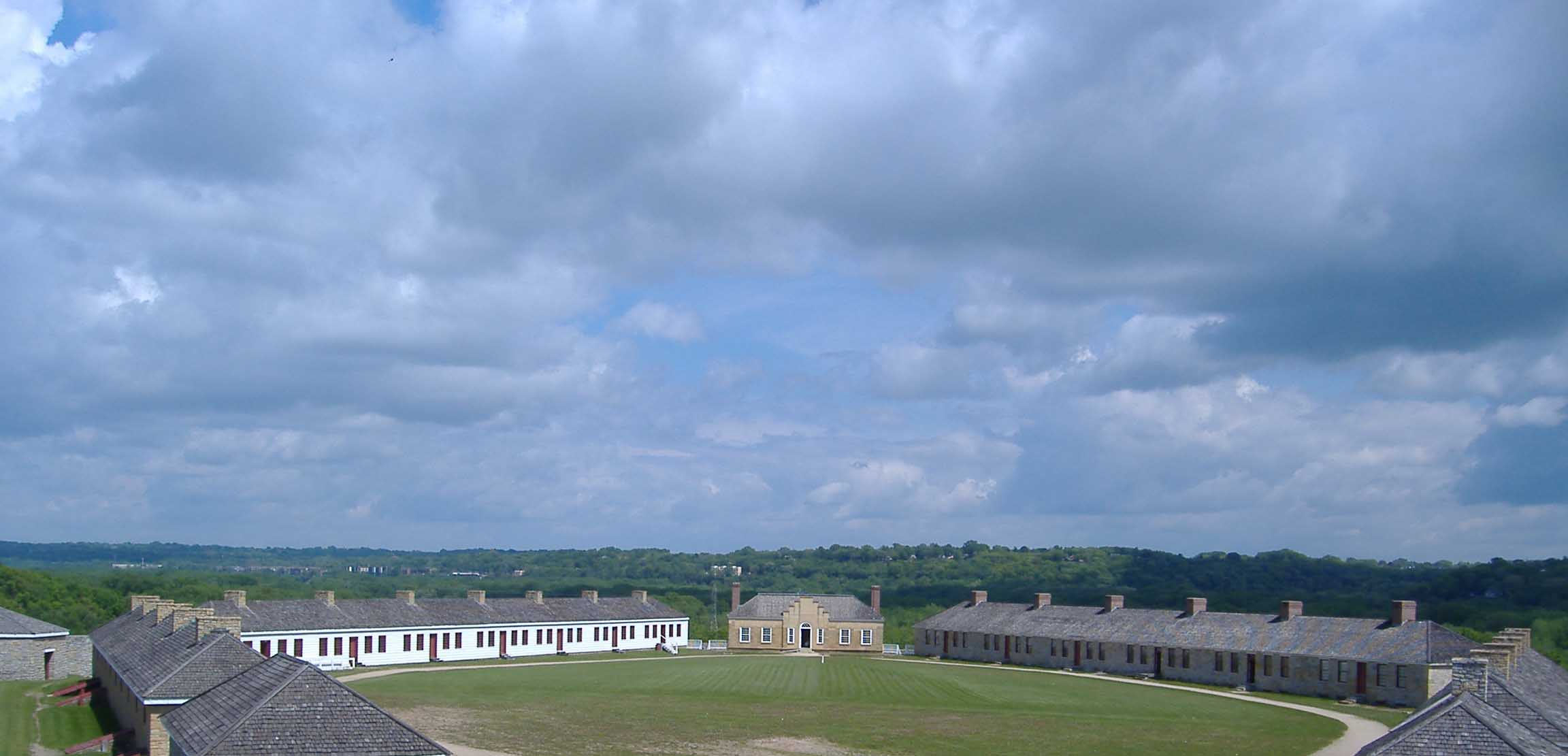
Fort Snelling

=== Founding of Fort Snelling ===
Fort Snelling was established in 1819 to extend United States jurisdiction over the area and to allay concerns about British fur traders in the area. The soldiers initially camped at a site on the south side of the Minnesota River, but conditions were hard there and nearly a fifth of the soldiers died of scurvy in the winter of 1819–1820. They later moved their camp to Camp Coldwater in May 1820. Much of the military's activity was conducted there while the fort was built. Camp Coldwater, the site of a cold, clear, flowing spring, was also considered sacred by the native Dakota.

The soldiers needed to supply the fort, so they built roads and planted vegetables, wheat, and hay, and raised cattle. They also made the first weather recordings in the area. A lumber mill and a grist mill were built on the falls in 1822 to supply the fort.

=== Enclosures east of the Mississippi ===
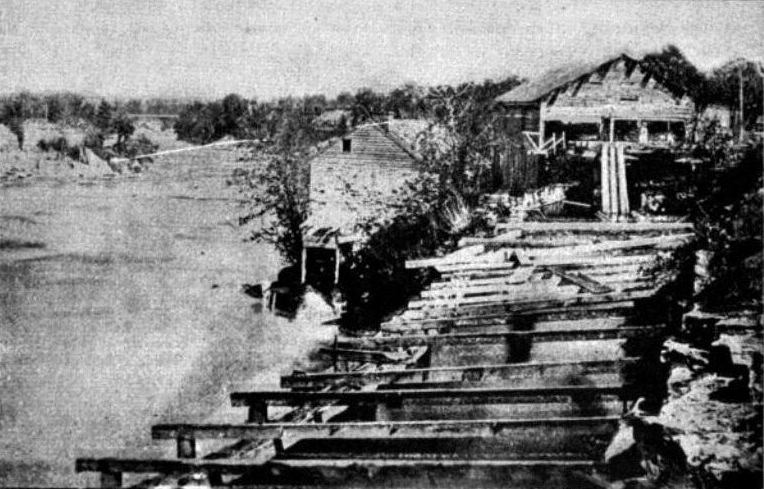
Government gristmill and sawmill

A settlement on the east bank of the Mississippi near St. Anthony Falls was envisioned in the 1830s by Joseph Plympton, who became commander of Fort Snelling in 1837. He made a more accurate survey of the reservation lands and transmitted a map to the War Department delimiting about 34,000 acres (140 km^{2}) within the reservation. He cleverly drew the boundary line to exclude certain parts of the east bank that had been part of the 1805 cession to Zebulon Pike. His plan was to stake a pre-emption claim at the falls. However, Franklin Steele also had plans to stake a claim.

On July 15, 1838, word reached Fort Snelling that a treaty between the United States and the Dakota and Ojibwa had been ratified, ceding land between the St. Croix River and the Mississippi Rivers. Steele rushed off to the falls, built a shanty, and marked off boundary lines. Plympton's party arrived the next morning, but they were too late to claim the most desirable land. Plympton claimed some less desirable land near Steele's claim, as did other settlers such as Pierre Bottineau, Joseph Rondo, Samuel Findley, and Baptiste Turpin. Steele went on to build a dam at the falls and built a sawmill that cut logs from the Rum River area.

=== West of St. Anthony Falls ===
The Dakota were hunters and gatherers and soon found themselves in debt to fur traders. Pressed by a whooping cough outbreak, loss of buffalo, deer, and bear, and loss of forests to logging, in 1851 in the Treaty of Traverse des Sioux, the Mdewakanton sold the remaining land west of the river, allowing settlement in 1852.

Franklin Steele also had a clever plan to obtain land on the west side of the falls. He suggested to his associated Colonel John H. Stevens that he should bargain with the War Department to obtain some land. Stevens agreed to operate a ferry service across the Mississippi in exchange for a claim of 160 acres (0.6 km^{2}) just above the government mills. The government approved this bargain, and Stevens built his house in the winter of 1849–1850. The house was the first permanent dwelling on the west bank in the area that became Minneapolis.

A few years later, the amount of land controlled by the fort was reduced with an order from U.S. President Millard Fillmore, and rapid settlement followed. The village of Minneapolis soon sprung up on the southwest bank of the river.

== City pioneers ==
=== St. Anthony ===
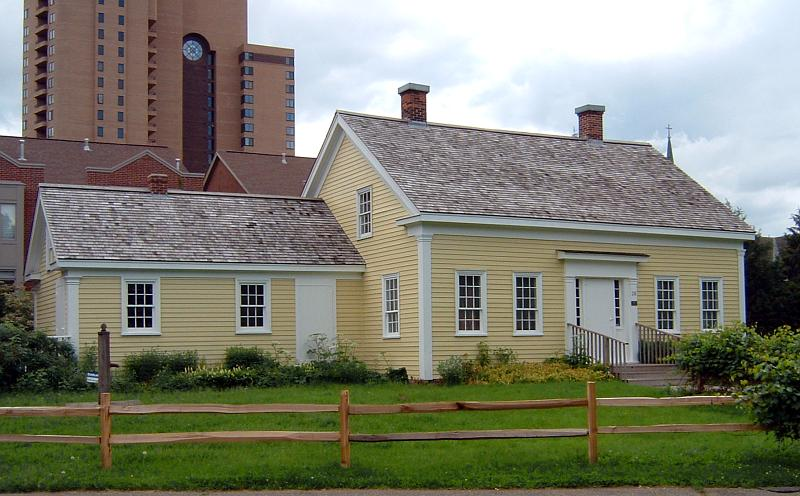
Home of Ard and Harriet Godfrey

After Franklin Steele obtained proper title to his land, he turned his energies to building a sawmill at St. Anthony Falls. He obtained financing and built a dam on the east channel of the river between Hennepin Island and Nicollet Island, along with a sawmill equipped with two up-and-down saws. His partner Daniel Stanchfield, a lumberman who had moved to Minnesota, dispatched crews up the Mississippi River to begin cutting lumber. The sawmill began cutting lumber in September 1848. In October 1848, Steele enlisted Ard Godfrey to supervise the mill at a salary of $1500 per year. Steele platted a townsite in 1849 and gave it the name "St. Anthony". The town quickly grew with workers. In addition to the first sawmill and several others that followed, a grist mill was built in 1851. By 1855, the town had approximately 3000 people, and it was incorporated as a city. Godfrey's house, built in 1848, was purchased by the Hennepin County Territorial Pioneers' Association and moved to Chute Square. The house was surveyed in 1934 by the Historic American Buildings Survey.

=== Minneapolis ===
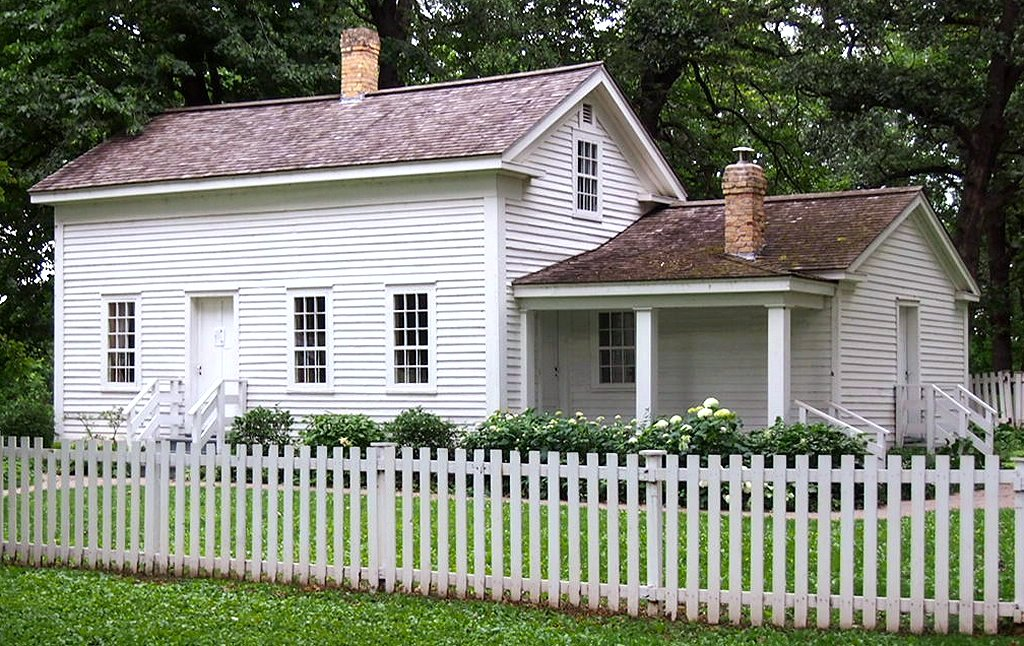
Home of John Stevens

On the west side of the river, John H. Stevens platted a townsite in 1854. He laid out Washington Avenue parallel to the river, with other streets running parallel to and perpendicular to Washington. He later questioned his decision, thinking he should have run the streets directly east–west and north–south, but it ended up aligning nicely with the plat of St. Anthony. The wide, straight streets, with Washington and Hennepin Avenue being 100 feet (30 m) wide and the others being 80 feet (24 m) wide, contrasted with Saint Paul's streets that were 60 feet (18 m) wide.

==== Name of Minneapolis ====
Before its incorporation, the city was known by several different names. The Dakota name for Minneapolis is Bdeóta Othúŋwe ('Many Lakes City'). The St. Paul Pioneer dubbed it facetiously "All Saints" anticipating that the town might absorb its neighbors St. Paul and St. Anthony. First west-bank settler John H. Stevens preferred "Hennepin" for the town and "Snelling" for the county. It was called "Lowell" for its water features, "Addiesville" or "Adasville" for a daughter of settler Charles Hoag, "Winona" by those who wished to preserve indigenous language, and "Brooklyn". "Albion" was recorded by the newly organized county government but a majority of residents rejected that name. The city's first schoolmaster, Hoag was searching for indigenous syllables, when he stumbled on "Indianapolis" and was led by the twenty four small lakes that are now within the city limits.

In the St. Anthony Express, Hoag proposed "Minnehapolis," with a silent h, to combine the Dakota word for waterfall, Mníȟaȟa, and the Greek word for city, polis. Express editor George Bowman and Daniel Payne dropped the h, leaving out the hah, to create Minneapolis, meaning 'city of the falls'.

=== Urban status ===
The Minnesota Territorial Legislature recognized Saint Anthony as a town in 1855 and Minneapolis in 1856. Boundaries were changed and Minneapolis was incorporated as a city in 1867. Minneapolis and Saint Anthony joined in 1872. Minneapolis changed more than 100 road names in 1873, including deduplication of names between it and the former Saint Anthony.

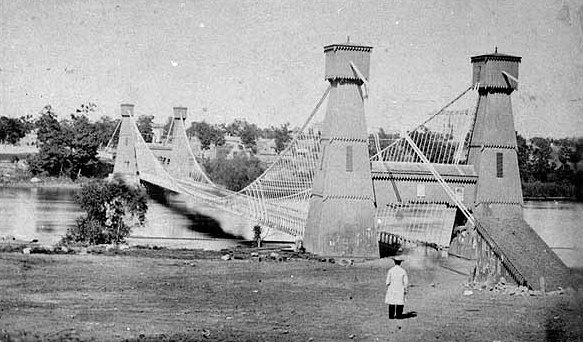
The first bridge over the Mississippi River at Hennepin Avenue, circa 1865.

=== Transportation ===
==== Hennepin Avenue Bridge ====
The Hennepin Avenue Bridge, a suspension bridge that was the first bridge built over the full width of the Mississippi River, was built in 1854 and dedicated on January 23, 1855. The bridge had a span of 620 feet (190 m), a roadway of 17 feet (5.2 m), and was built at a cost of $36,000. The toll was five cents for pedestrians and twenty-five cents for horsedrawn wagons.

==== Rail transportation ====
The early settlers of Minnesota were anxiously seeking railroad transportation, but insufficient capital was available after the Panic of 1857. Rails were finally built in Minnesota in 1862, when the St. Paul and Pacific Railroad built its first ten miles (16 km) of track from the Phalen Creek area in St. Paul to a stop just short of St. Anthony Falls. The railroad continued building track from Minneapolis to Elk River in 1864 and to St. Cloud in 1866, and from Minneapolis west to Howard Lake in 1867 and Willmar in 1869.

Meanwhile, the Minnesota Central, an early predecessor of the Milwaukee Road, built a line from Minneapolis to Fort Snelling in 1865. The railroad gradually extended to Faribault, Owatonna, and Austin. It crossed the Iowa border and met up with the McGregor & Western line. This connection gave Minneapolis rail service to Milwaukee via Prairie du Chien, Wisconsin, with through service beginning on October 14, 1867.

A streetcar system in the Minneapolis area took shape in 1875, when the Minneapolis Street Railway company began service with horse-drawn cars. Under the leadership of Thomas Lowry, the company merged with the St. Paul Railway Company and took the name Twin City Rapid Transit. By 1889, when electrification began, the system had grown to 115 miles (185 km).

== Business and industry ==
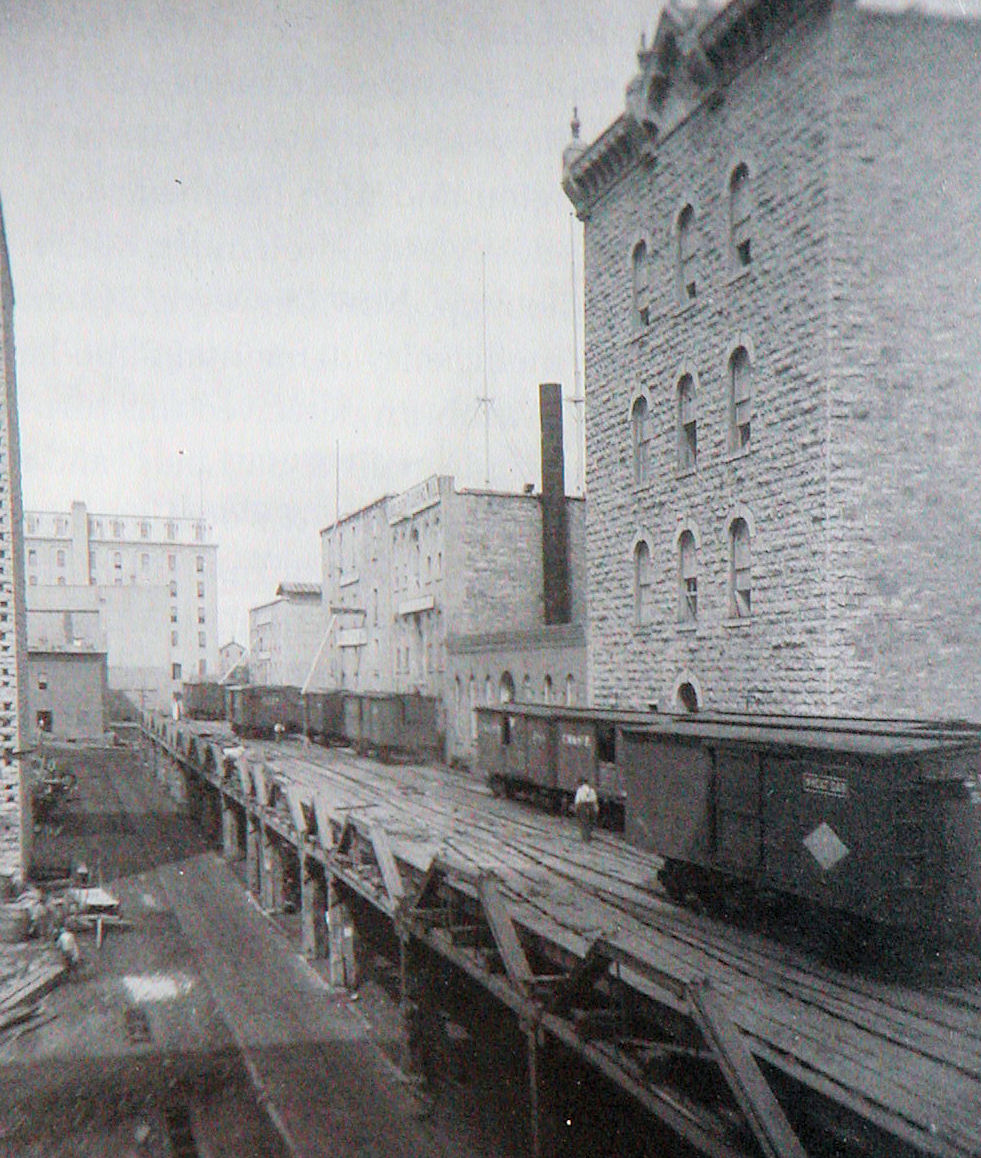
The Minneapolis and St. Louis Railway monopolized freight service to the west side milling district until about 1879 when Minneapolis Eastern Railway built a competing line closer to the river. This photograph, taken ca. 1878 shows the M&StL trestle built over the 1st Street canal, which supplied water power to the west side mills.

Most of the early industrial development in Minneapolis was tied to St. Anthony Falls and the power it provided. Between 1848 and 1887, Minneapolis led the nation in sawmilling. In 1856, the mills produced 12 million board feet (28,000 m^{3}) of lumber. That total had risen to about 91 million board feet (210,000 m^{3}) in 1869, and 960 million board feet (2,300,000 m^{3}) in 1899. During the peak of this activity, at least 13 sawmills were operating on the falls. The sawmills also supported related industries such as mills that planed and smoothed the lumber; factories that built sashes, doors, and windows; and manufacturers of shingles and wooden buckets.

The flour milling industry, dating back to the Fort Snelling government mill, later eclipsed the lumber industry in the value of its finished product. Flour production stood at 30,000 barrels (4,800 m^{3}) in 1860, rising to 256,100 barrels (40,720 m^{3}) in 1869. Cadwallader C. Washburn's imposing mill, built in 1866, was six stories high and promoted as the largest mill west of Buffalo, New York. Other prominent industries at the falls included foundries, machine shops, and textile mills.

During this time, St. Anthony, on the east side, was separate from Minneapolis, on the west side. As a result of inferior management of the water power, St. Anthony found its manufacturing district declining. Some people and organizations started to talk about merging the two cities. A citizens' committee recommended merging the two cities in 1866, but a vote on this issue was rejected in 1867. Minneapolis incorporated as a city in 1867. The two cities found themselves competing with St. Paul, which had a larger population, the head of navigation of the Mississippi River, and more access to railroads.

In 1886 Richard Warren Sears started a mail-order watch business in Minneapolis, calling it "R.W. Sears Watch Company," before relocating the business to Chicago and later founding Sears, Roebuck and Co., more commonly known as Sears.

=== Threatened collapse of St. Anthony Falls ===
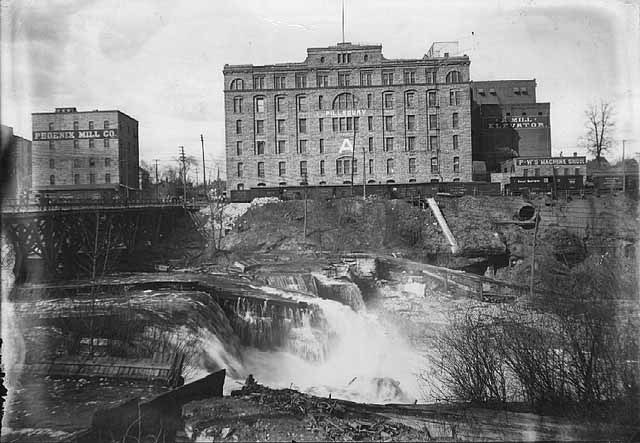
The Pillsbury "A" Mill and neighboring Phoenix Mill in the early 1900s

The two cities were later pushed toward merger by a disaster that nearly wiped out the falls. The geological formation of the area consisted of a hard, thin layer of limestone overlaying a soft sandstone formation. As the sandstone eroded away, large blocks of limestone would fall off causing the falls to progress upstream. The expansion of milling and industry at the falls accelerated the process of erosion. If the fragile limestone cap ever eroded away completely, the falls would turn into a rapids that would no longer provide water power.

The Eastman tunnel was a tailrace tunnel being excavated in the sandstone from below the falls, under Hennepin Island, under the limestone cap, to Nicollet Island. On October 4, 1869, a hole in the limestone cap over the tunnel broke through as the tunnel neared Nicollet Island. The torrent of water blasted Hennepin Island and threatened to destroy the falls. Attempts to plug the hole were partially successful.

The fix was a concrete dike (wall) built by the Corps of Engineers just upstream from the falls all the way across the river from just under the limestone cap down as much as 40 feet (12 m). Progression of the falls upstream was a separate problem, and was stopped by the Corps finishing a wooden apron (later replaced by concrete) creating a spillway to protect the edge of the falls and underlying sandstone. The Corps also built low dams above the falls to keep the limestone wet, as drying increased weathering. This work assisted by the Corps was eventually completed in 1884. The federal government spent $615,000 on this effort, while the two cities spent $334,500. Possibly as a result of the bonding needed to rehabilitate the falls, the cities of St. Anthony and Minneapolis merged on April 9, 1872.

=== Development of flour milling ===
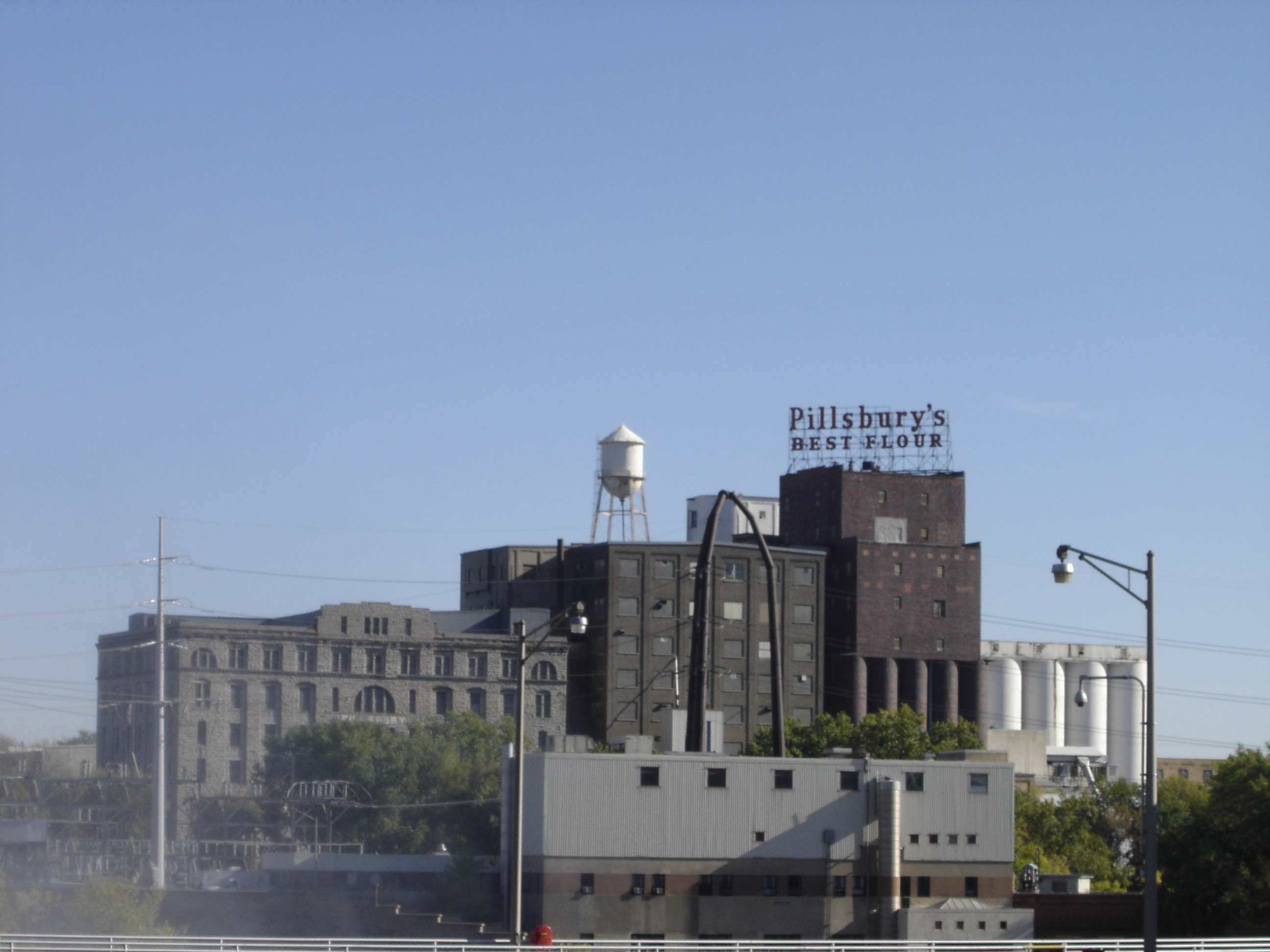
The Pillsbury "A" Mill on the east bank of the Mississippi.

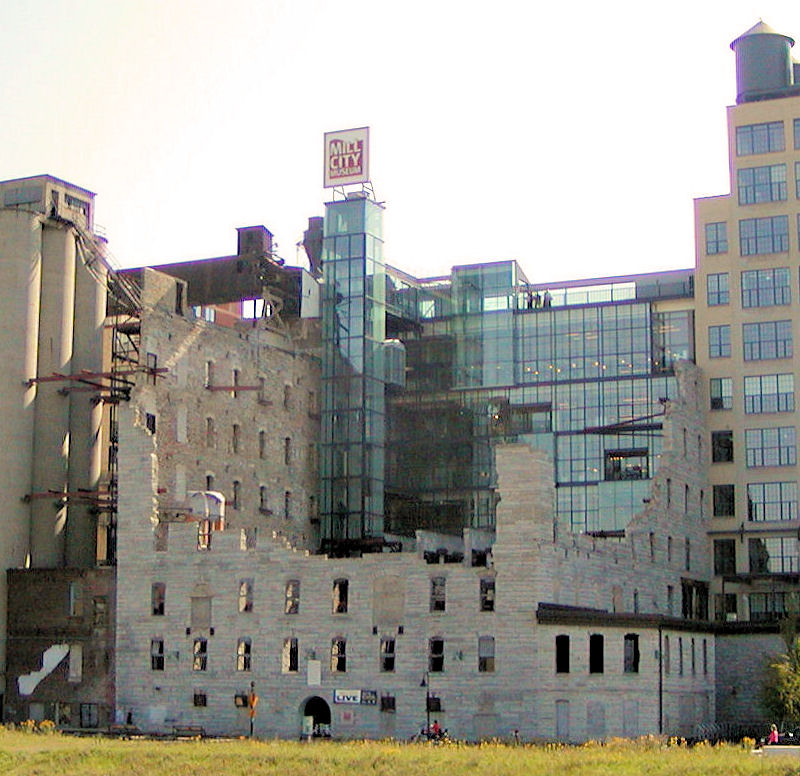
The Washburn "A" Mill, nearly destroyed in a 1991 fire, is now open as the Mill City Museum.

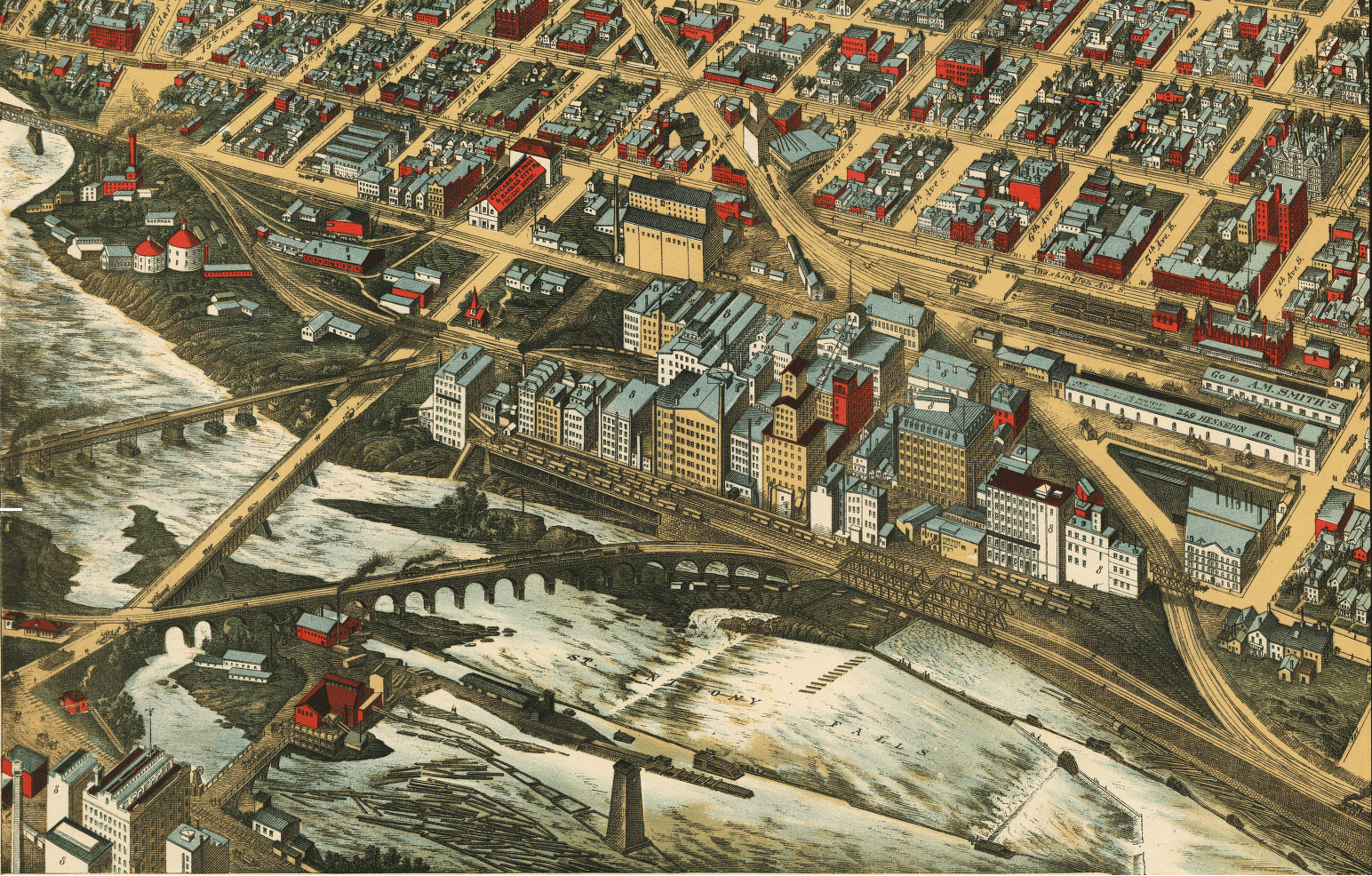
Lithograph from 1895 showing the prominence of the Mills District.

The St. Anthony Express newspaper predicted in 1855 that, "The time is not distant when Minnesota, with the superiority of her soil and seasons for wheat culture, and her unparalleled water power for manufacturing flour, will export largely of this article. ... our mills will turn out wheat, superior in quality and appearance to any now manufactured in the West." By 1876, eighteen flour mills had been built on the west side of the river below the falls. The first mills used traditional technology of millstones that would pulverize the grain and grind as much flour as possible in one pass. This system worked best for winter wheat, which was sown in the fall and resumed its growth in the spring. However, the harsh winter conditions of the upper Midwest did not lend themselves to the production of winter wheat, since the deep frosts and lack of snow cover killed the crop. Spring wheat, which could be sown in the spring and reaped in the summer, was a more dependable crop. However, conventional milling techniques could not produce a desirable product from spring wheat, since the harder husks of its kernels fractured between the grindstones. The gluten and starch in the flour could not be mixed completely, either, and the flour would turn rancid. Minneapolis milling companies solved this problem by inventing the middlings purifier, which made it possible to separate the husks from the flour earlier in the milling process. They also developed a gradual-reduction process, where grain was pulverized between a series of rollers made of porcelain, iron, or steel. This process resulted in "patent" flour, which commanded almost double the price of "bakers" or "clear" flour, which it replaced. The Washburn mill attempted to monopolize these techniques, but Pillsbury and other companies lured employees away from Washburn and were able to duplicate the process.

=== The Great Mill Disaster ===
As the flour industry grew steadily, one major event would disturb flour production. On May 2, 1878, the Washburn "A" Mill exploded when grain dust ignited. The explosion, known as the Great Mill Disaster, killed eighteen workers and destroyed one-third of the capacity of the milling district, as well as other nearby businesses and residences. By the end of the year, though, seventeen mills were back in operation, including the rebuilt Washburn "A" Mill and others that had been completely rebuilt.

=== Construction of the Pillsbury "A" Mill ===
The millers also took the opportunity to rebuild with new technology such as dust collection systems. The largest mill on the east side of the river was the Pillsbury "A" Mill, built in 1880–1881 and designed by local architect LeRoy S. Buffington. The Pillsbury Company wanted a building that was beautiful as well as functional. The seven-story building had stone walls six feet thick at the base tapering to eighteen inches at the top. With improvements and additions over the years, it became the world's largest flour mill. The Pillsbury "A" Mill is now a National Historic Landmark, along with the Washburn "A" Mill.

In 1891, Northwestern Consolidated Milling Company was formed, consolidating many of the smaller mills into one corporate entity. Between 1880 and 1930, Minneapolis led the nation in flour production, earning it the nickname "Mill City". Minneapolis surpassed Budapest as the world's leading flour miller in 1884, and production stood at about 7,000,000 US dry barrels (810,000 m^{3}) annually in 1890. In 1900, Minneapolis mills were grinding 14.1 percent of the nation's grain, and in 1915–16, flour production hit its peak at 20,443,000 US dry barrels (2,363,800 m^{3}) annually.

Panorama of Minneapolis circa 1908 with the mill district on the right.

=== Hydroelectric power ===
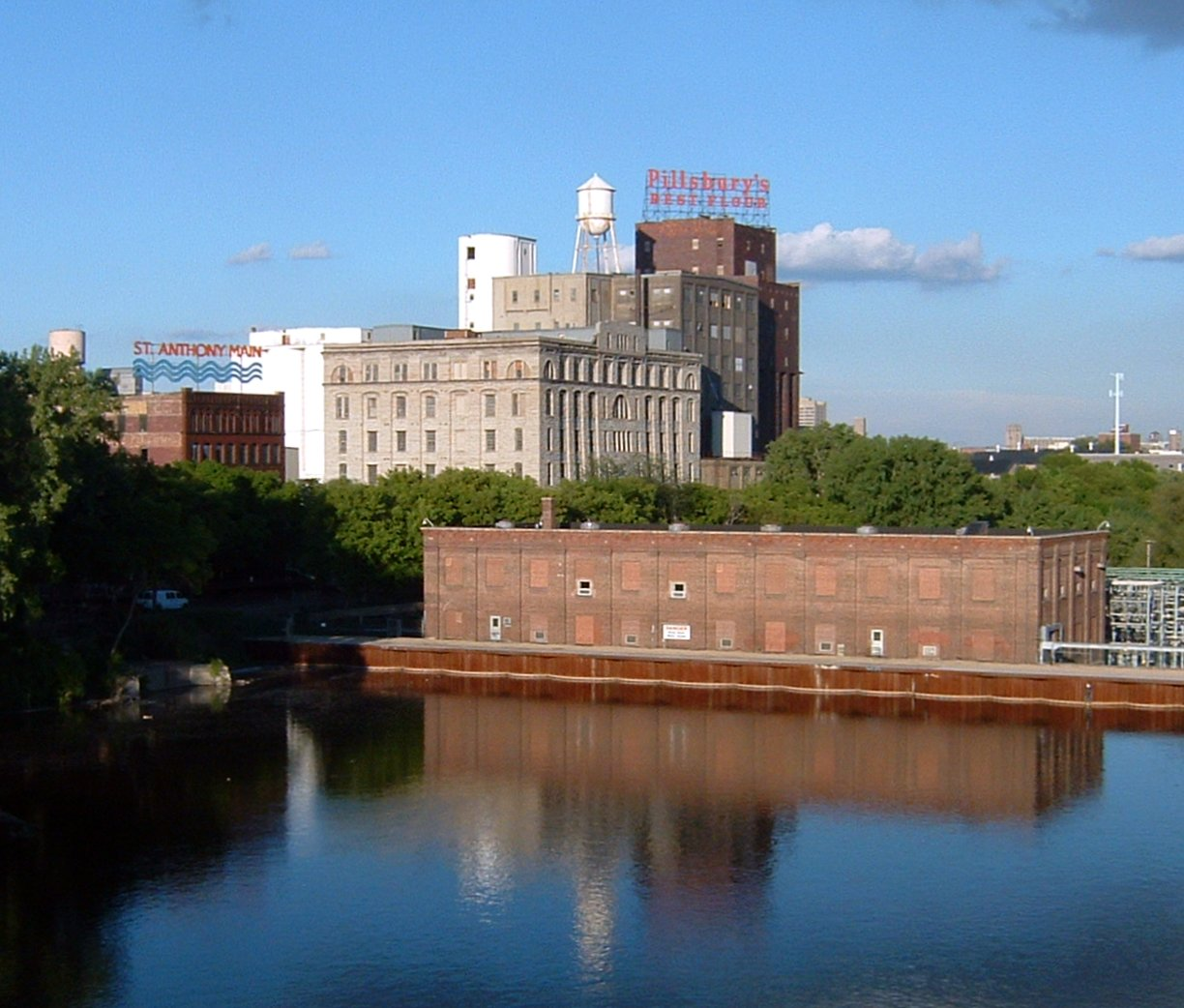
The 1911 Main Street Station on the east bank of the Mississippi, with the Pillsbury "A" Mill in the background.

In 1882, the first central station (supplying multiple users) hydroelectric power plant in the United States was built at the falls on Upton Island. The Brush Electric Company, headed by Charles F. Brush, supplied the equipment, which included five generators. The electricity was transmitted via four circuits to shops on Washington Avenue. The power plant turned on the lights on September 5, 1882, just ahead of the Vulcan Street Plant in Appleton, Wisconsin, which started generating electricity on September 30. The company competed with the Minneapolis Gas Light Company, which later became Minnegasco and is now part of CenterPoint Energy. The flour mills were under increasingly consolidated management, and plants on the Minneapolis mill properties generated hydroelectricity with surplus water. Hydroelectricity became the equal of flour milling as a user of the falls's power.

In 1895, William de la Barre began building a lower dam, 2,200 feet (670 m) downriver from the falls. His objective was to build a hydroelectric plant that would sell energy to Twin City Rapid Transit, which was then using steam power to generate electricity. The dam was completed on March 20, 1897. Later, in 1906, he began construction of the Hennepin Island Hydroelectric Plant. The plant was leased to Minneapolis General Electric, which sublet the plant to Twin City Rapid Transit. Minneapolis General Electric later became Northern States Power Company, now known as Xcel Energy, bought the united mill companies in 1923, and by the 1950s controlled over 53,000 horsepower at the falls.

=== Railroads ===
The development of sawmills and flour mills at the falls spurred demand for railroad service to Minneapolis. In 1868, Minneapolis was only served by a spur from St. Paul, from the Chicago, Milwaukee, St. Paul and Pacific Railroad, and by the fledgling St. Paul and Pacific Railroad. Minneapolis millers found that railroads based in Milwaukee and Chicago were favoring their cities by diverting wheat from Minneapolis mills. In response, the owners of several Minneapolis mills chartered the Minneapolis and St. Louis Railway, which would connect the Lake Superior and Mississippi Railroad through Minneapolis to the Iowa border. Meanwhile, Jay Cooke took control of the St. Paul and Pacific Railroad in 1871 with the goal of aggregating it into the Northern Pacific Railway. Bad economic conditions caused the Panic of 1873, and the Northern Pacific had to relinquish control of the St. Paul and Pacific Railroad and the Lake Superior and Mississippi Railroad.

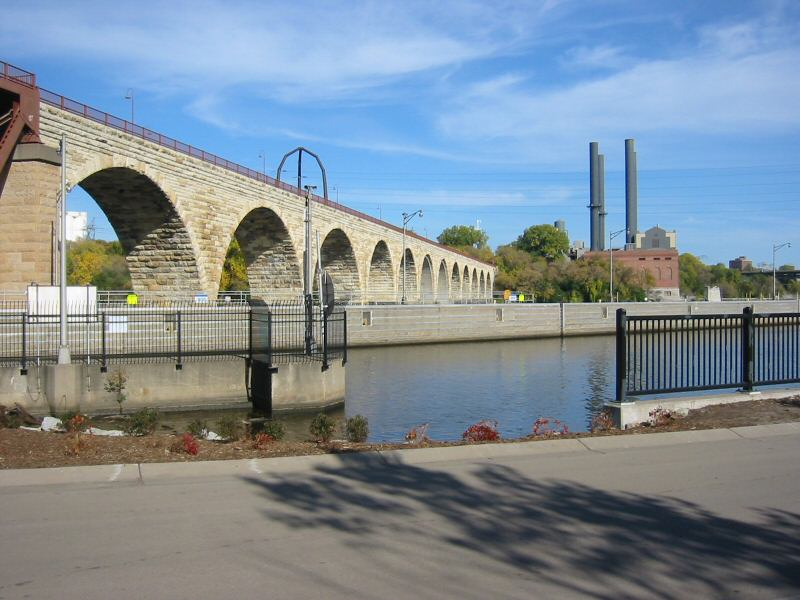
The Stone Arch Bridge

James J. Hill eventually reorganized the St. Paul and Pacific Railroad as the St. Paul, Minneapolis and Manitoba Railroad, which later became the Great Northern Railway. The Manitoba line had two lines leading to the Red River Valley, giving it access to wheat-growing regions, and it served several mills in Minneapolis. Rapid westward expansion of the railroads from Minneapolis during the Dakota Boom of 1878-1886 facilitated both the growth of Minneapolis's milling industry and the settlement of the Dakota Territory.

The Manitoba's small passenger station at Minneapolis had become inadequate, so Hill decided to build a new depot that he expected to share with other railroads. Since the Manitoba's mainline ran on the east side of the Mississippi, a new bridge across the river was needed to reach the station. The result was the Stone Arch Bridge, completed in 1883. The Minneapolis Union Depot was opened for passenger service on April 25, 1885.

Meanwhile, the Milwaukee Road expanded their presence in Minneapolis with a "Short Line" connection from St. Paul to Minneapolis in 1880 and through the acquisition of the Hastings and Dakota Railroad, which had a line going west from Minneapolis to Montevideo, Ortonville, and into Aberdeen, South Dakota. They also built a large railyard and shops on Hiawatha Avenue just north of Lake Street, and a large depot on Washington Avenue.

The Minneapolis, Sault Ste. Marie & Atlantic Railway got its start in 1883, with a goal of serving Atlantic ports via Sault Ste. Marie, Michigan and bypassing Chicago altogether.

=== Other businesses ===
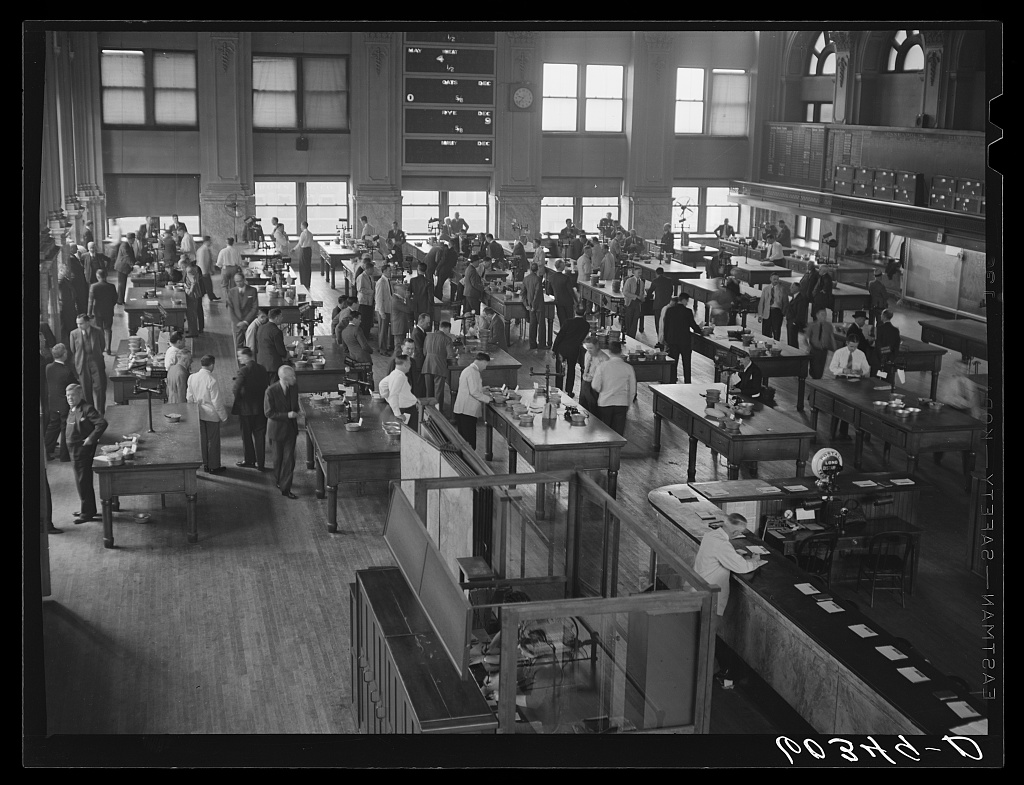
Minneapolis Grain Exchange, circa 1939

The Minneapolis Chamber of Commerce was founded in 1881 as a market to trade grain. It helped farmers by ensuring that they got the best prices possible for their wheat, oats, and corn, since the usual supply and demand curves were skewed by similar harvest times across the region. In 1883, they introduced its first futures contract for hard red spring wheat. In 1947, the organization was renamed the Minneapolis Grain Exchange, since the term "chamber of commerce" had become synonymous with organizations that lobbied for business and social issues.

The flour milling industry also spurred the growth of banking in the Minneapolis area. Mills required capital for investments in their plants and machinery and for their ongoing operations. By the early 20th century, Minneapolis was known as "the financial center of the Northwest".

== Cultural institutions ==
=== Education ===
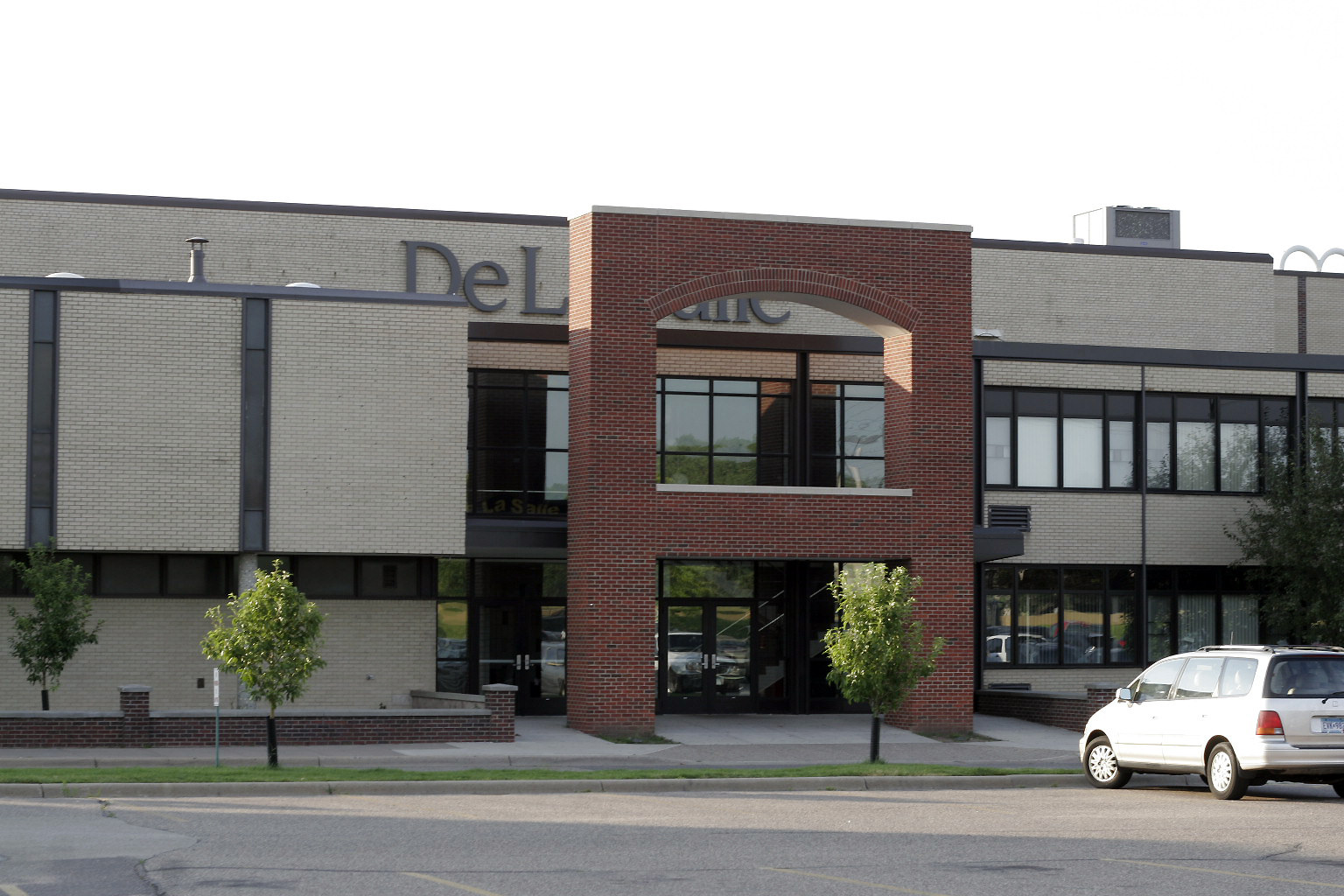
DeLaSalle High School exterior

The University of Minnesota was charted by the state legislature in 1851, seven years before Minnesota became a state, as a preparatory school. The school was forced to close during the American Civil War because of financial difficulties, but with support from John S. Pillsbury, it reopened in 1867. William Watts Folwell became the first president of the university in 1869. The university granted its first two Bachelor of Arts degrees in 1873, and awarded its first Doctor of Philosophy degree in 1888. From its beginnings in the St. Anthony area, the university eventually grew into a large campus on the east bank of the Mississippi, along with its campus in St. Paul and the addition of a West Bank campus in the 1960s.

DeLaSalle High School was founded by Archbishop John Ireland in 1900 as a Catholic secondary school. Its early mission was as a commercial school, but in 1920, parents were asking for a college preparatory school. The school has been in operation for over 100 years in several buildings on Nicollet Island.

=== Parks ===
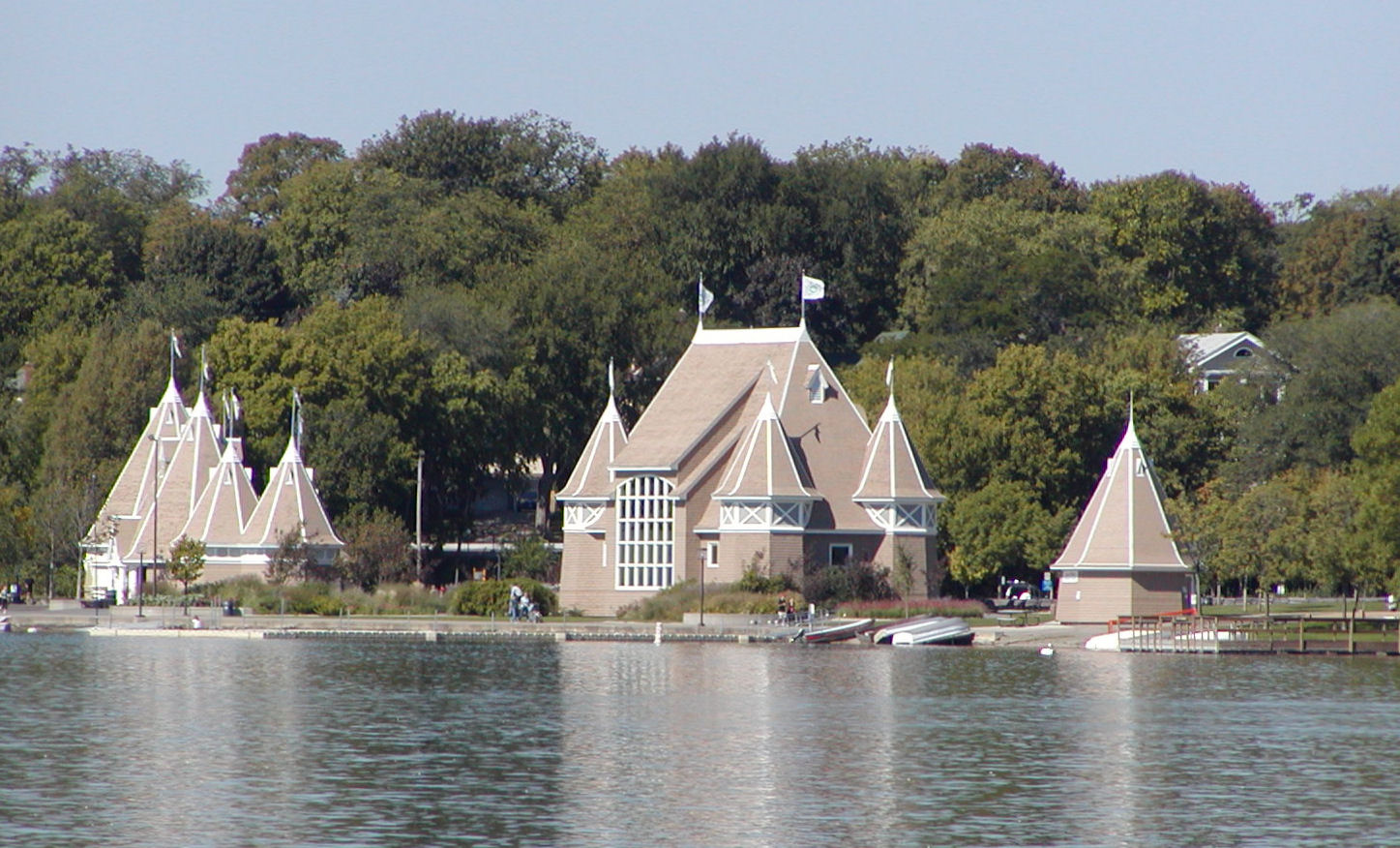
Bandshell at Lake Harriet, 2006

The first park in Minneapolis was land donated to the city in 1857, but it took about 25 years for the community to take a major interest in its parks. The Minneapolis Board of Trade and other civic leaders pressed the Minnesota Legislature for assistance. On February 27, 1883, the Legislature authorized the city to form a park district and to levy taxes. The initial vision was to create a number of boulevards, based on the design concepts of Frederick Law Olmsted, that would connect parks. Civic leaders also hoped to stimulate economic development and increase land values. Landscape architect Horace Cleveland was hired to create a system of parks named the "Grand Rounds".

Lake Harriet was donated to the city by William S. King in 1885 and the first bandshell on the lake was built in 1888. The current bandshell, built in 1985, is the fifth one in its location.

Minnehaha Falls was purchased as a park in 1889. Henry Wadsworth Longfellow named a character in his epic poem, The Song of Hiawatha, after the falls.

In 1906, Theodore Wirth came to Minneapolis as the parks superintendent, built parkways for the automobile, dredged lakes, sculpted land, and managed details of park expansion. Superintendent in the 1960s and 1970s, Robert W. Ruhe created neighborhood parks and recreation centers in hitherto underserved areas. During his tenure, the park system increased from 1,810 acres (7.3 km^{2}) in 57 properties to 5,421 acres (21.94 km^{2}) in 144 properties. The park system, organized around the Minneapolis chain of lakes (including Cedar Lake, Lake of the Isles, Bde Maka Ska, Lake Harriet, Lake Hiawatha, and Lake Nokomis) became a model for park planners around the world. He also encouraged active recreation in the parks, as opposed to just setting aside parks for passive admiration. In 2022, 500 participants ages 14 to 24 served as Teen Teamworks recruits for on-the-job training in green careers or as future park employees.

=== Arts ===
The Minneapolis Institute of Art was established in 1883 by twenty-five citizens who were committed to bringing the fine arts into the Minneapolis community. The present building, a neoclassical structure, was designed by the firm of McKim, Mead and White and opened in 1915. It later received additions in 1974 by Kenzo Tange and in 2006 by Michael Graves.

The Minnesota Orchestra dates back to 1903 when it was founded as the Minneapolis Symphony Orchestra. It was renamed the Minnesota Orchestra in 1968 and moved into its own building, Orchestra Hall, in downtown Minneapolis in 1974.

The Walker Art Center grew out of the Walker Art Gallery, which was established in 1927 by Thomas Barlow Walker, a wealthy lumber baron, as the first public art gallery in the Upper Midwest. Walker had been inviting the public into his home to view his extensive art collection since the 1880s. He built the Walker Art Gallery to perpetuate his public service focus after his death, which occurred soon after the Gallery opened. In the 1940s, under the auspices of the WPA Arts Project, the museum shifted its focus toward modern art, after a gift from Mrs. Gilbert Walker made it possible to acquire works by Pablo Picasso, Henry Moore, Alberto Giacometti, and others. The museum continued its focus on modern art with traveling shows in the 1960s and is now one of the "big five" modern art museums in the U.S.

=== Churches ===
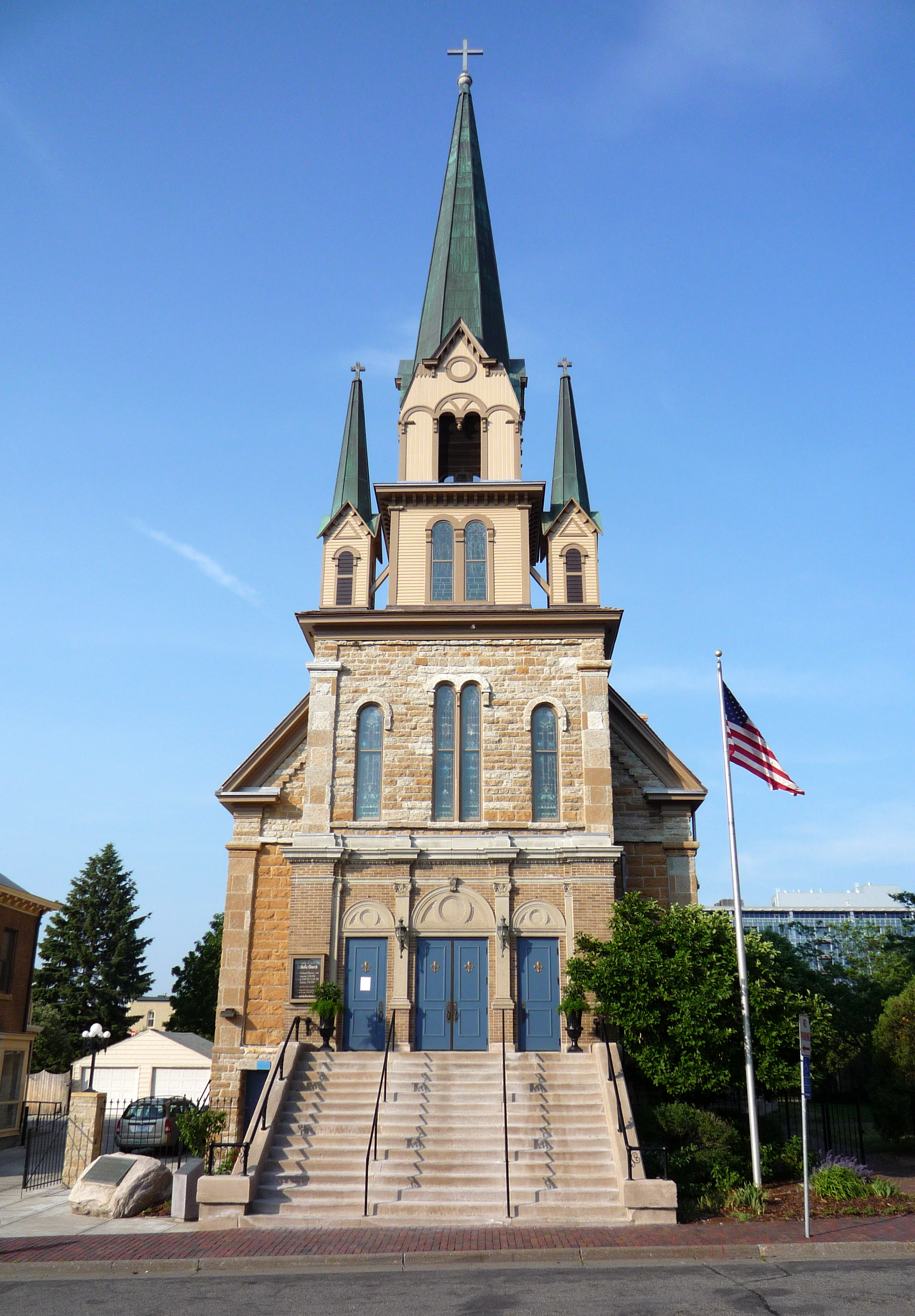
Our Lady of Lourdes

Our Lady of Lourdes Catholic Church was founded in 1854. It is the oldest church in Minneapolis in continuous use. The church was originally built by the First Universalist Society, and later became a Catholic church in 1877 when a Catholic French Canadian congregation acquired it.

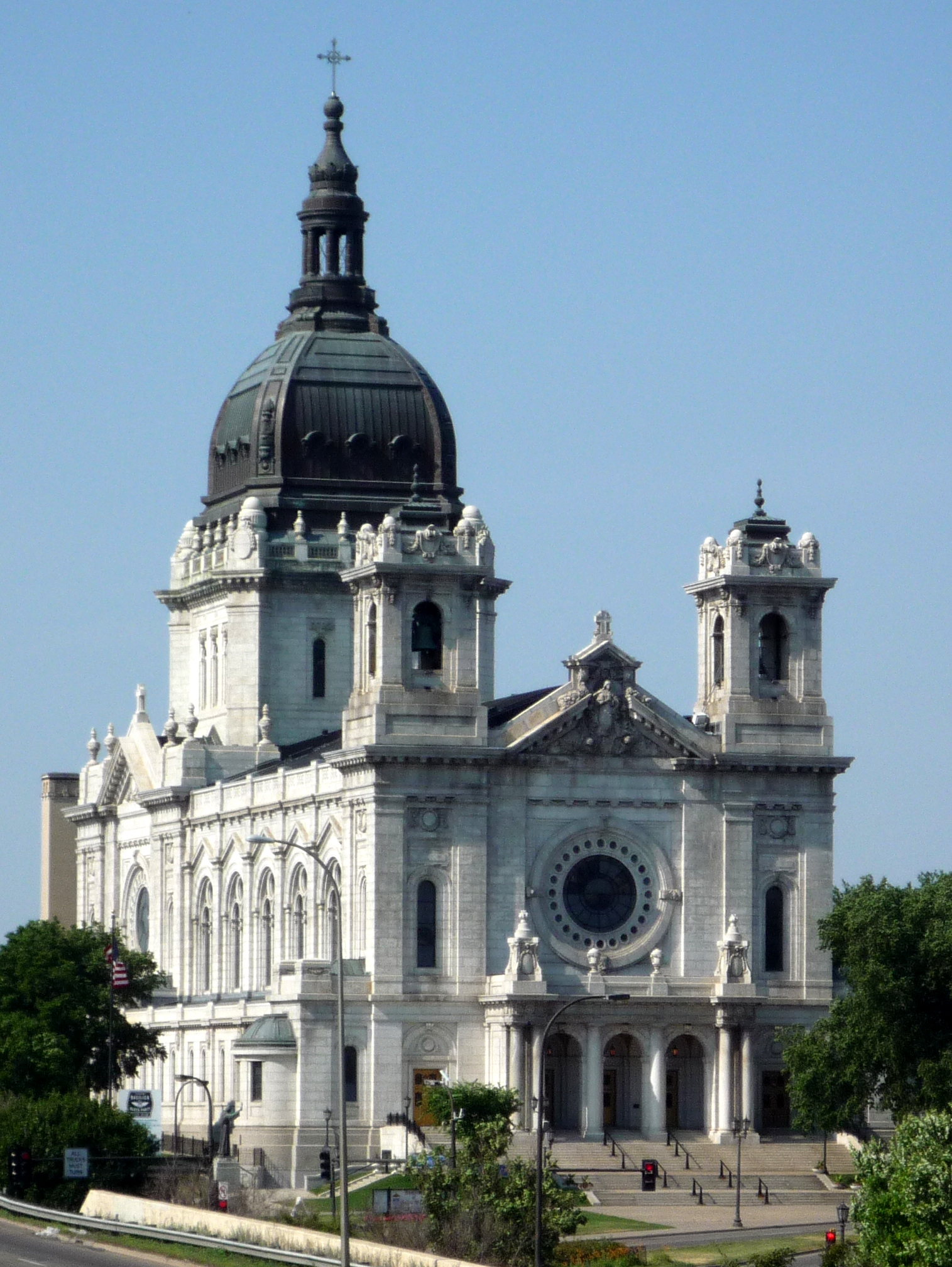
Basilica of Saint Mary

The Basilica of Saint Mary was constructed between 1907 and 1915 on land that was formerly a farm, then a zoological garden. Archbishop John Ireland supervised the planning of the church, originally named the Pro-Cathedral of Minneapolis, along with the Cathedral of St. Paul in Saint Paul. He chose architect Emmanuel Masqueray, who was trained at the École des Beaux-Arts in Paris. The first Mass was held on May 31, 1914. Church leaders desired to build the finest altar in America, handcrafted of the finest marble they could afford. It was elevated to the rank of basilica and became the first basilica in the United States in 1926. The building is listed on the National Register of Historic Places as one of the area's finest examples of Beaux-Arts architecture.

== 20th century ==
In the first few decades of the 20th century, Minneapolis began to lose its dominant position in the flour milling industry, after reaching its peak in 1915–1916. The rise of steam power, and later electric power, eroded the advantage that St. Anthony Falls provided in water power. The wheat fields of the Dakotas and Minnesota's Red River Valley began suffering from soil exhaustion due to consecutive wheat crops, leading to an increase in wheat leaf rust and related crop diseases. The farmers of the southern plains developed a variety of hardy red winter wheat suitable for bread flour, and the Kansas City area gained prominence in milling. Also, due to changes in rail shipping rates, millers in Buffalo, New York were able to ship their flour more competitively.

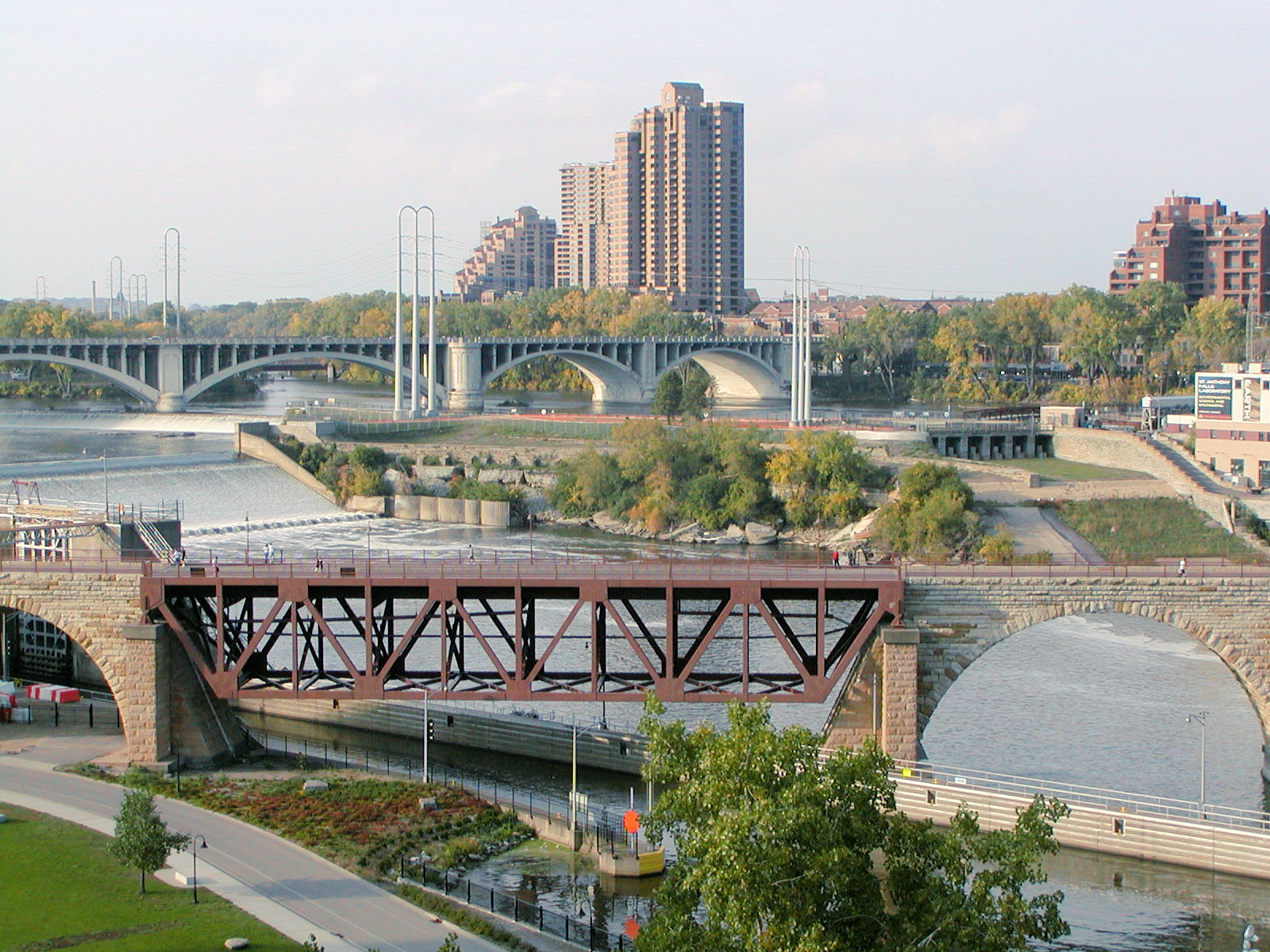
In 1963 the Stone Arch Bridge was altered to allow clearance for the upper lock

In response, companies such as the Washburn-Crosby Company and Pillsbury began marketing their brands specifically to consumers. Washburn-Crosby branded their flour "Gold Medal", in recognition of a prize won in 1880, and advertised with the slogan "Eventually – Why Not Now?" Pillsbury countered with their slogan, "Because Pillsbury's Best", incorporating their brand name "Pillsbury's Best". Washburn-Crosby invented the character Betty Crocker to answer product questions. They also purchased a radio station in 1924 and renamed it WCCO, standing for "Washburn Crosby Company". Washburn-Crosby merged with several other regional milling companies in 1928 and renamed themselves General Mills. Both General Mills and Pillsbury sought to diversify beyond flour milling by sponsoring baking contests and publishing recipes. They also began developing semi-prepared foods, such as Bisquick and prepared foods, such as Wheaties.

After 1930, the flour mills gradually began to shut down. The buildings were either vacated or demolished, the railroad trestle that served the mills was demolished, and the former mill canal and mill ruins were filled in with gravel. The last two mills left at the falls were the Washburn "A" Mill and the Pillsbury "A" Mill. In 1965, General Mills shut down the Washburn "A" Mill, along with several other of their oldest mills. All milling operations throughout the city's corridors such as Hiawatha Avenue and the Midtown Greenway ceased by the early 20th century. Demand for rail use also fell as a result.

In 1934, a large general strike occurred shutting down the city for several months, significant unrest occurred as well as violence against strikers. It had significant effects for both labor and politics within the city.

To continue economic use of the river, civic leaders pushed for plans to build locks and dams, making the Mississippi River navigable above Saint Anthony Falls for the first time. Congressional approval for the Upper Minneapolis Harbor Development Project came in 1937 but it wasn't until 1950 through 1963, that the United States Army Corps of Engineers constructed two sets of locks at the lower dam and at the falls. They also covered the falls with a permanent concrete apron. The project also resulted in the disfiguration of the Stone Arch Bridge by replacing two of the arches with a steel truss. The rest of Spirit Island was also obliterated in the process.

=== Bigotry and corruption ===
Around the early 20th century, bigotry took hold in Minneapolis, sometimes persisting for many decades— even to the present time. Sometimes it was shorter-lived. In 1910, and soon copied by other developers, a Minneapolis developer created restrictive covenants in his deeds that were prohibitive for certain races and ethnic groups, preventing minorities from owning or leasing these properties. State law in 1953 and the federal Fair Housing Act of 1968 prohibited discrimination, however restrictions against minorities were still found in many Minneapolis deeds as of 2017.

Minneapolis was known for anti-Semitism beginning in the 1880s and through the 1950s. The city was described as "the capital of anti-Semitism in the United States" in 1946 by Carey McWilliams and in 1959 by Gunther Plaut. At that time the city's Jews were excluded from membership in many organizations, faced employment discrimination, and were considered unwelcome residents in some neighborhoods. Jews in Minneapolis were also not allowed to buy homes in certain neighborhoods of Minneapolis. In the 1940s a lack of anti-Semitism was noted in the Midwest with the exception of Minneapolis. McWilliams noted in 1946 the lack of anti-Semitism in neighboring Saint Paul.

In February 1915, African-American members of the local NAACP protested showings of The Birth of a Nation, an epic silent film which portrayed Black Americans through racial stereotypes and Ku Klux Klan members as heroes. By October 1915, the Elliot Sherman Film Company gained the rights to the film and The Birth of a Nation began showing in Minnesota. Minneapolis mayor Wallace G. Nye had preemptively banned the film from local theaters, because of its controversial nature. However, legal battles between Nye and local businessmen ensued. Nye consulted various minority groups, who recommended he drop the ban, although none of the people consulted were African-American. Nye agreed, and theaters began showing the film as scheduled on October 31. On November 19, the Minnesota Supreme Court upheld the Hennepin County District Court's decision to allow screenings of the movie, despite protests by Black and white demonstrators.

In Winter 1917, 800 Ku Klux Klan impersonators paraded between downtown Minneapolis and Saint Paul to promote the Minneapolis Auto Show. Women riding horses dressed in Klan uniforms had appeared in at least two previous parades as well. The show admitted over 155,000 visitors over its eight-day run, and openly marketed its cars using Ku Klux Klan uniforms and messaging, although it's unlikely that employees were actual Klan members. Both business-owners and the Minneapolis Police Department were supportive of the show, with police chief Lewis Harthill even joining the parade. For the most part, the Ku Klux Klan held power in the city only from 1921 until 1923.

From the passage of a state eugenics law in 1925, and throughout the Progressive Era, citizens of Minnesota used laws to control behaviors. The proprietors of Eitel Hospital in Minneapolis provided the expertise to sterilize people at Faribault State Hospital. (Note: Molly Ladd-Taylor found that many of those patients labeled feeble-minded had experienced "family violence, sexual abuse, disability, and abject poverty.")

The 1920s and 1930s of Prohibition, gangsters and mobs ruled the underworld of the city. North Minneapolis was ruled by Jewish gangsters led by Isadore Blumenfield, also known as Kid Cann, who was also linked to murders, prostitution, money laundering, the destruction of the Minneapolis streetcar system and political bribery. Chief O'Connor of the Saint Paul Police established the O'Connor System which provided a haven for crooks in the capital city and a headache for Minneapolis Police. Corruption spread to the MPD as an Irishman named Edward G. "Big Ed" Morgan operated gambling dens with bootleggers under police protection. Danny Hogan, the underworld "Godfather" of Saint Paul allied with Morgan and the two competed with the Jewish gangsters until the wane of Prohibition and Hogan's death.

=== Politics and social change ===
Hubert Humphrey got his start in Minnesota politics in the early 1940s. He was an organizer of the Minnesota Democratic Party at the time, and he realized that the party's best chance of success would come if the Minnesota Farmer-Labor Party merged with the Democratic party. Other party leaders had been discussing the merger, but Humphrey's idea was to keep the Farmer-Labor name in the name of the merged party, in order to gain the strength of thousands of loyal voters. Thus, the party got the name Minnesota Democratic-Farmer-Labor Party.

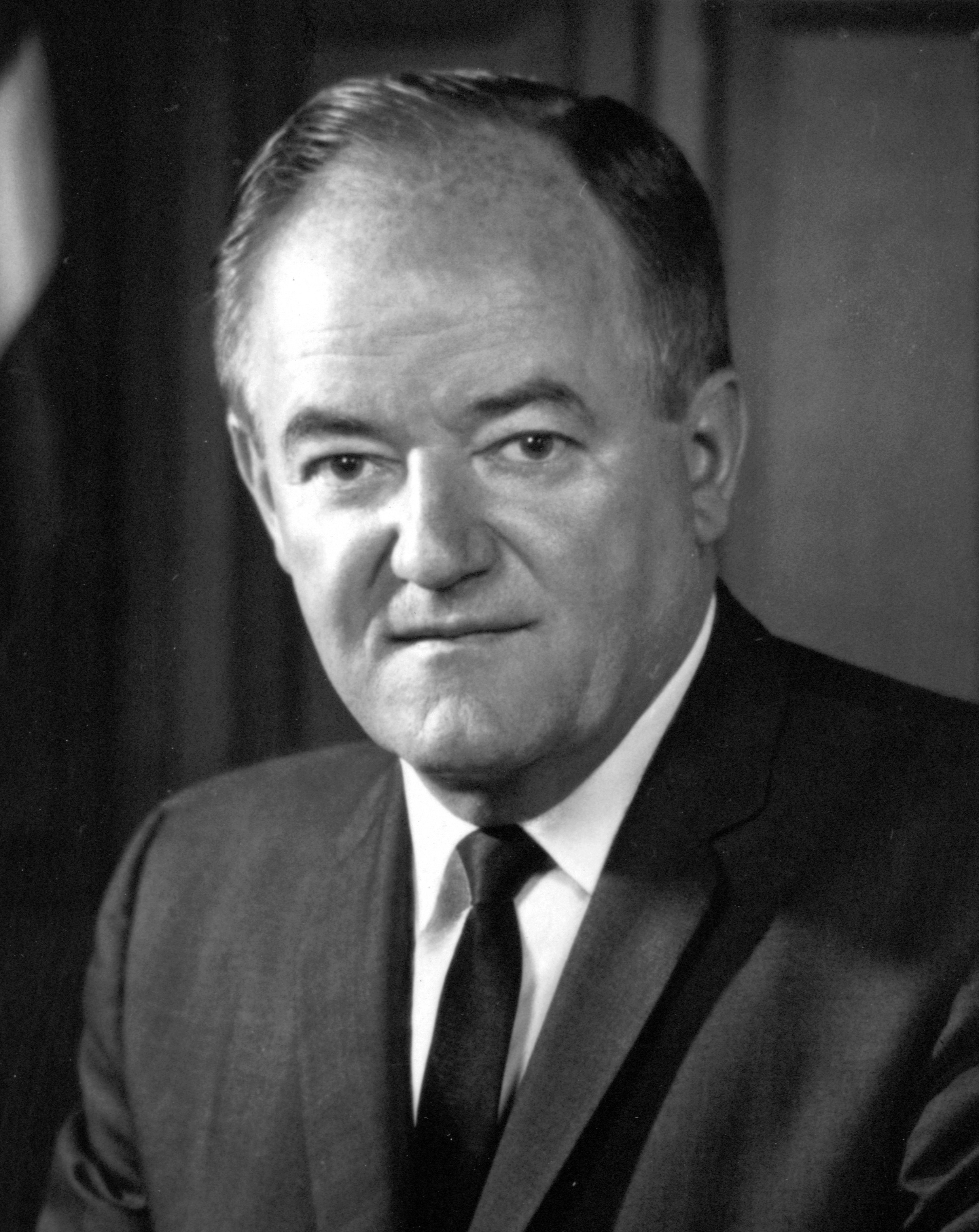
Humphrey would later go on to serve as vice president under President Lyndon B. Johnson

Humphrey first ran for mayor of Minneapolis in 1943, losing by only six thousand votes. He campaigned again in the 1945 election, with the support of the city's labor leaders, and found support with the city's African-American community by promising to implement a city civil rights commission. He also appealed to the city's middle class by giving talks on civic virtue at area churches. He was elected in 1945 by the largest margin to date. When elected, he immediately proposed a city ordinance that would make racial discrimination by employers subject to a fine. After a long period of discussion, the Minneapolis City Council finally approved the ordinance by a 21 to 3 margin on January 31, 1947. The ordinance created the nation's first Fair Employment Practices Ordinance and established Minneapolis as the nation's leader in imposing fines for employment discrimination, though pressure from the local Urban League would also limit employment opportunities for African Americans during the ordinance's first few years.

In contrast to similar measures passed in Milwaukee and Chicago, the Minneapolis Fair Employment ordinance gave the city's newly created Fair Employment Practices Commission (FEPC) authority to not only impose fines, but also prison sentences for employers who enacted job discrimination. Larger banks and department stores saw the value in civil rights and began to hire more African-Americans. Humphrey also recognized that city police officers operating under racial and ethnic prejudice were causing urban unrest, so he instructed the city's police chief to have officers in minority neighborhoods keep in contact with clergy, teachers, business owners, and other neighborhood leaders. This helped to redefine the issue of prejudice and got its attention as a problem that could be solved, not just a fact of life that had to be taken for granted.

Humphrey's progress with civil rights in Minneapolis gained national attention, with many cities inquiring about how they could establish their own civil rights commissions. In 1947, he was reelected with 102,000 votes over his opponent's 52,000 votes. As a delegate to the 1948 Democratic National Convention, he led the call for a strong civil rights plank. In his address, he said, "There are those who say to you – we are rushing this issue of civil rights. I say we are 172 years late. There are those who say – this issue of civil rights is an infringement on states rights. The time has arrived for the Democratic Party to get out of the shadow of state's rights and walk forthrightly into the bright sunshine of human rights." Humphrey was elected to the United States Senate in the 1948 election and served many years as a prominent Minnesota politician, including Vice President of the U.S. from 1965 to 1969.

W. Harry Davis, who later served 20 years on the Minneapolis School Board, agreed to run for mayor in 1971, becoming the city's first black mayoral candidate supported by a major political party. White supremacists were still present in Minneapolis, and threatened his family daily during the campaign. The police department guarded their home and the FBI gave them protection dogs. Davis also received support from white politicians including Humphrey, Donald M. Fraser, and Walter Mondale. Twenty years later, Minneapolis elected its first African American mayor, Sharon Sayles Belton. To date, she has been the city's only non-white mayor.

In 1968, Dennis Banks and Clyde Bellecourt were among those who founded the American Indian Movement to advance civil rights for Native Americans.

=== Population growth and transportation ===
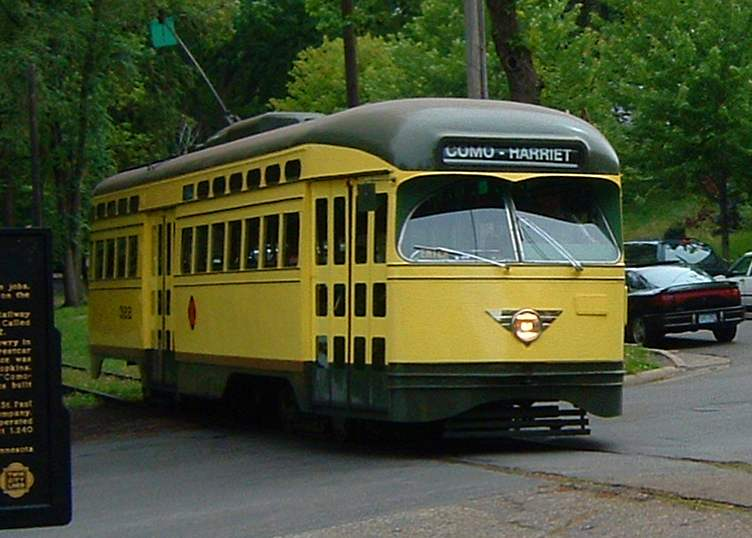
A former TCRT streetcar now operates between lake Bde Maka Ska and Lake Harriet as part of the Minnesota Streetcar Museum.

From about 200,000 in the 1900 Census, Minneapolis soared to its highest population recorded in 1950 of over 521,000 people. The main growth of the city was in part due to an organized private streetcar system. With 140 million passengers by 1920, the streetcars ran down important roads extending from Downtown Minneapolis. Neighborhood residential development out of the core mostly dates around the turn of the century as a result of this system. This growth also allowed Minneapolis to annex land from neighboring villages and townships which subsequently pushed the incorporation of today's inner ring suburbs.

The streetcar system was built by Twin City Rapid Transit and operated efficiently through 1949, with a program of reinvesting their profits into system improvements. However, in 1949, New York investor Charles Green gained control of the system, halted the rebuilding program, and announced a goal of completely converting the system to buses by 1958. These policies alienated the public and he was ousted in 1951, but his successor, Fred Ossanna, continued to cut service and replace the system with buses. On June 19, 1954, the last streetcar took its run. A photo taken in 1954 shows James Towley handing Fred Ossanna a check while one of the streetcars burned in the background. Later on, it was discovered that Ossanna and associates had plundered the streetcar system for personal gain. A small section of the line between lake Bde Maka Ska and Lake Harriet is now operated by the Minnesota Streetcar Museum.

=== Reshaping downtown ===
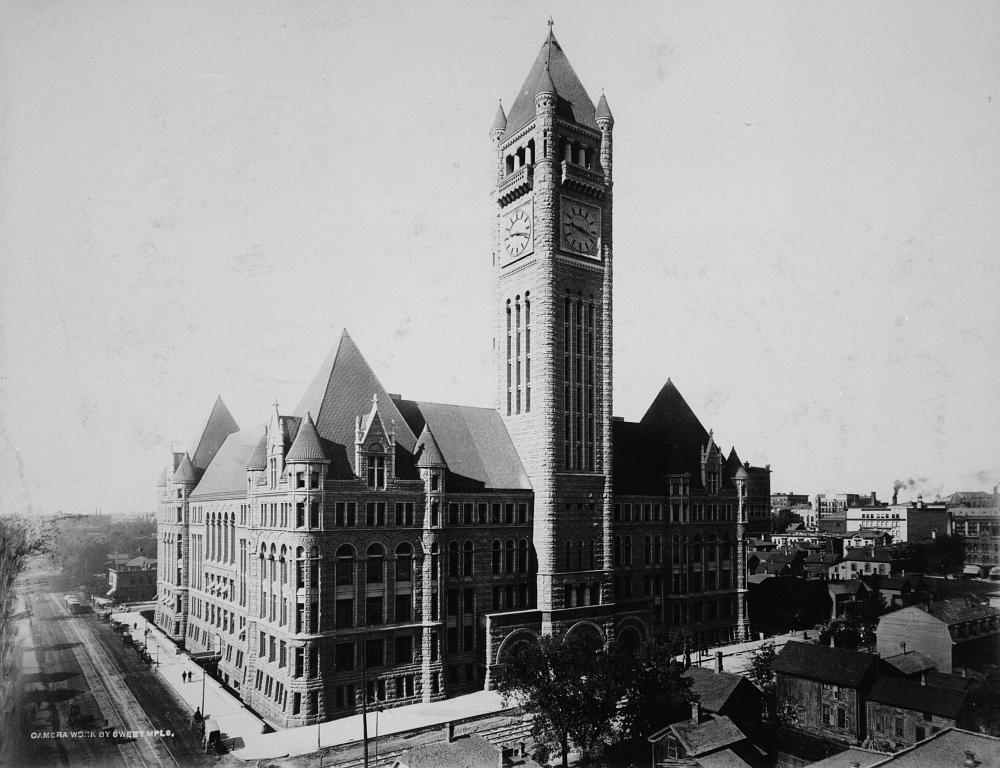
Minneapolis City Hall

Downtown Minneapolis was the hub of business and financial activity. The Minneapolis City Hall (which also served as the Hennepin County Courthouse at the time) was the tallest building in Minneapolis from its construction in 1888 until 1929. A municipal ordinance instituted in 1890 restricted buildings to a height of 100 feet (30 m), later raised to 125 feet (38 m). The construction of the First National – Soo Line Building in 1915, with a height of 252 feet (77 m), caused concerns among the real estate industry, so the 125-foot (twelve story) limit was reimposed at the request of the Minneapolis Civic and Commerce Association.

The twenty-seven story Rand Tower, built in 1929, was the next major challenger to the height limit. The thirty-two story Foshay Tower, also built in 1929, was the highest building in Minneapolis until 1971. Its builder, Wilbur Foshay, wanted a tower built along the lines of the Washington Monument. He staged a lavish dedication ceremony complete with a march composed by John Philip Sousa. About six weeks later, Foshay lost his fortune in the Wall Street Crash of 1929. Foshay's $20,000 check to Sousa bounced, and Sousa forbade anyone else to play the march until the debt was repaid.

During the Great Depression, buildings suffered from a lack of maintenance. Writer Sinclair Lewis, returning to Minneapolis after a long absence, said, "Minneapolis is so ugly. Parking lots like scars. Most buildings are narrow, drab, dirty, flimsy, irregular in relationship to one another — a set of bad teeth." A decade later, downtown and surrounding areas would be reshaped radically by urban renewal and freeway construction. After World War II, businesses and residents started moving to the suburbs, and downtown Minneapolis, along with downtowns across the nation, was perceived as dying. Urban planners, such as Le Corbusier, were advocating radically rebuilding downtowns by complete rebuilding and forcing out manufacturing and warehousing. The Federal Housing Act of 1949 provided funding for clearing blighted areas, and city officials interpreted the definition of "blighted" liberally. The Federal Aid Highway Act of 1956 provided funding for an interstate highway system, which would also transform Minneapolis.

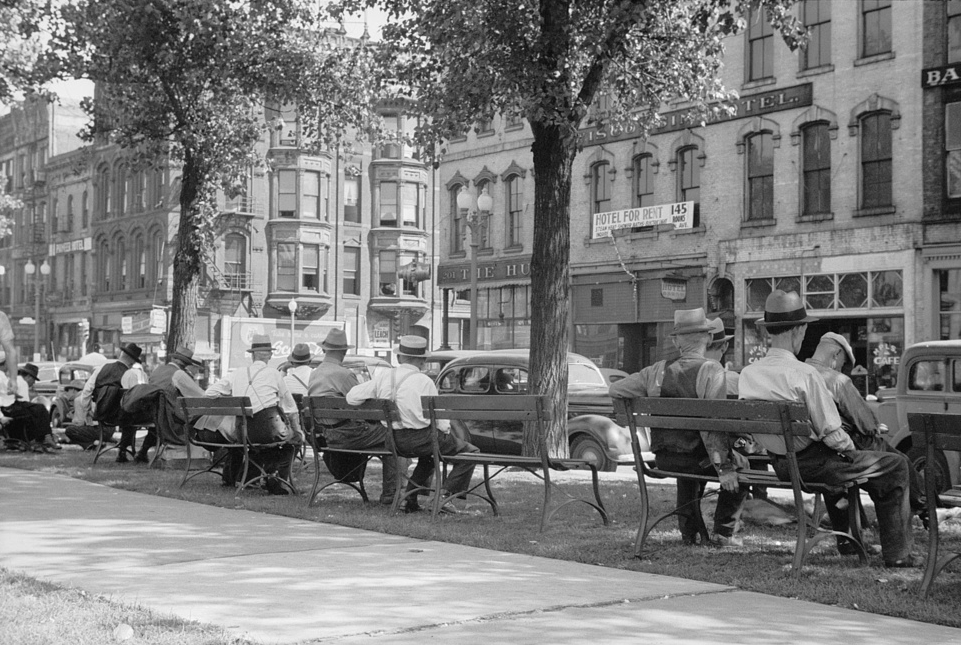
The Gateway District

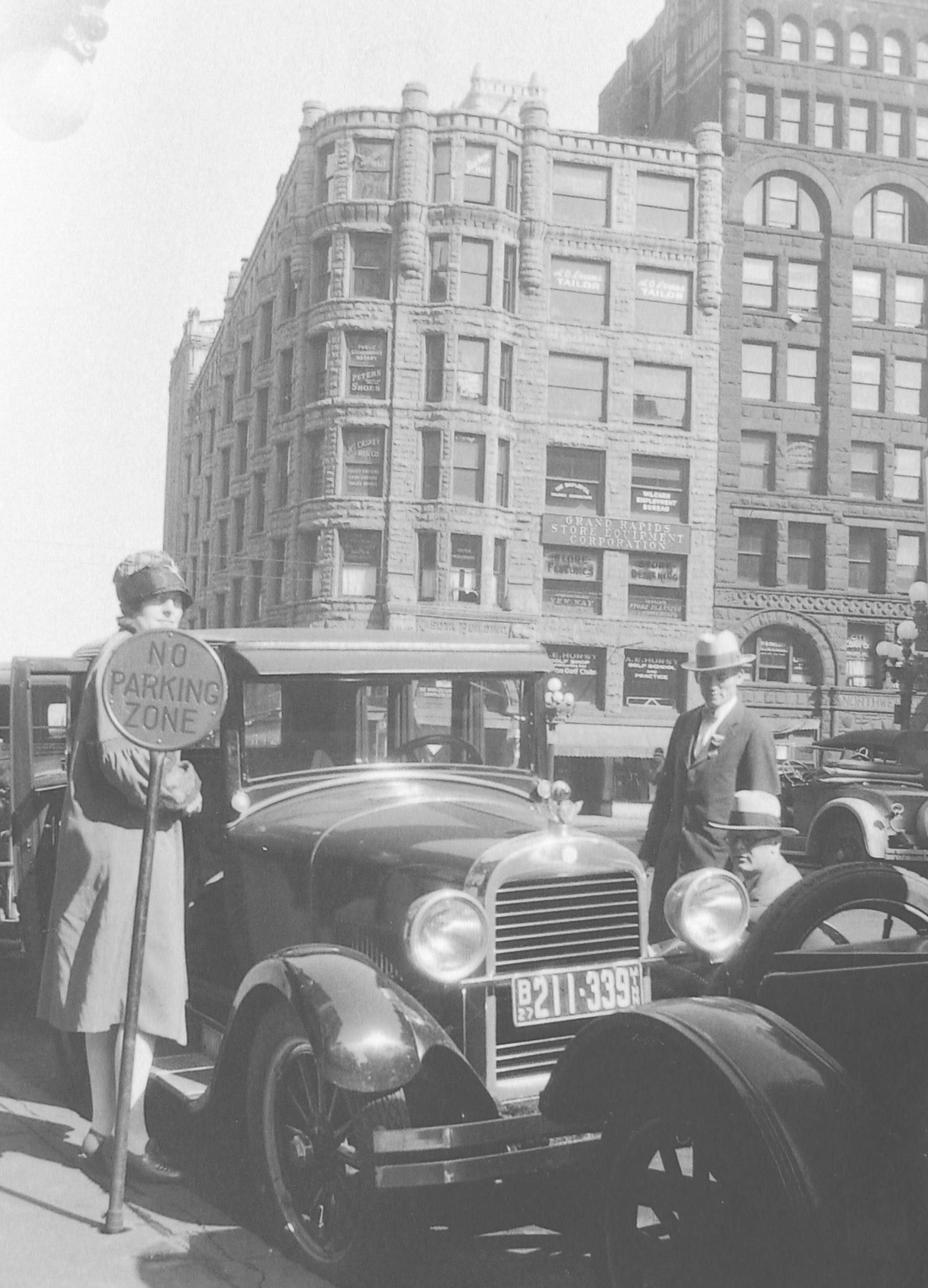
Kasota building in 1927 Gateway District.

The Gateway district, centered around the intersection of Hennepin and Nicollet Avenues just west of the Mississippi River, was the major casualty of urban renewal. The neighborhood had become known as a slum with cheap hotels and flophouses. When General Mills announced in 1955 that they were moving their corporate headquarters to Golden Valley, city planners decided to implement a large-scale Gateway district plan that included demolishing a large number of buildings. Between 1957 and 1965, one-third of downtown Minneapolis had been leveled, including the Metropolitan Building and Kasota building.

=== Freeways ===
Freeway construction had its impact on the city, with neighborhoods disrupted and housing stock lost. Between 1963 and 1975, Interstate 35W from the south border of the city to its northeastern corner, Interstate 94 from the St. Paul border into downtown, and the Crosstown (County Road 62, later to become Minnesota State Highway 62) on the southern boundary of Minneapolis were built. The remaining portion of Interstate 94, from U.S. Highway 12 to the northern boundary of the city, was completed in 1982. Highway 12 was later rebuilt to Interstate standards in 1992, at which point it was renumbered Interstate 394.

==== Proposed freeways ====
Several proposed projects never were built, though. Minnesota State Highway 55, running southeast from downtown to the Fort Snelling area and the Minneapolis–Saint Paul International Airport, was slated to become a freeway, but the upgrade was canceled due to neighborhood opposition. Similarly, a proposed Interstate 335 was to run from Interstate 35W in northeast Minneapolis to a connection with Interstate 94 just north of downtown. This project was also canceled due to neighborhood opposition.

=== Anti-pornography movement ===
The anti-pornography movement in Minneapolis began in the 1980s, as a reaction to the city’s adult industry which had grown significantly in the 1970s. In the '70s, brothers Ferris and Edward Alexander had bought multiple adult businesses in the Central and Powderhorn neighborhoods, including the Rialto Theater on East Lake Street. The theater was popular among heterosexual and homosexual customers, the latter of whom began cruising at the location. As a result, the Minneapolis Police Department conducted raids of adult businesses and harassed their patrons throughout the following decade. This attack would disproportionately target poor and transgender citizens, as well as citizens of color and commercial sex workers. Many residents and the local media sided with the police department, blaming the Rialto for increased crime in the area. Twin Cities lesbian and feminist centers like the Women's Coffee House, the Lesbian Resource Center, and the Amazon Bookstore would later become ground zero for debates about pornography among radical feminists. Many of these radical feminist spaces were dominated by white, middle-class "respectable" Scandinavian Americans. An early opponent to pornography shops was the South Side Sewing Circle, who would frequently "browse" adult stores and confront their customers for buying pornography.

In 1977, the Minneapolis City Council enacted a zoning ordinance which outlawed the operation of adult businesses near churches, schools, or residential areas; however this ordinance was struck down in 1983 after Ferris Alexander sued the city and an appeals court ruled in his favor. After the reversal of the law, neighborhood residents formed various groups (Note: Organizing groups included the Neighborhood Pornography Task Force, Women Against Pornography, the Pornography Resource Center, and Citizens Against Pornography) which began direct action and political campaigns against the Alexanders' businesses. Despite white middle-class privilege among local feminist groups, this task force was composed of diverse racial and class groups, some of whom were former civil rights activists. Feminists Naomi Scheman, Catharine MacKinnon, and Andrea Dworkin became involved in local organizing. The latter two testified against pornography, however they were both against zoning restrictions, considering them an insufficient measure in fighting pornography. MacKinnon instead advocated for an elimination of pornography altogether, calling it a violation of women's civil rights, and its existence a product of patriarchal violence.

Charlee Hoyt, Republican city council member, then asked MacKinnon and Dworkin to author an expansion to the city’s anti-discrimination policy, which would eliminate pornography on the basis of radical feminist theory. Opponents of the proposed ordinance, including adult industry workers, civil libertarians, and members of the Christian Right were absent at its hearing; the Alexander brothers too were unconcerned about the ordinance. The law passed by a vote of 7 - 6, but was vetoed twice by then-mayor Donald M. Fraser. MacKinnon and Dworkin later wrote a similar policy for the conservative mayor and city council of Indianapolis, which was passed by the city council but then struck down in a federal appeals court in 1986.

After both the Indianapolis and Minneapolis policies received national news, a split was forged between anti-pornography or radical feminists, and sex-positive feminists nationally. Many Gay men also criticized anti-pornography action as a regulation of public sex and gay male sexuality. This disagreement also stemmed from conflicts between lesbians and gay men concerning protests against Anita Bryant in the mid-1970s.

=== Shaping the skyline ===
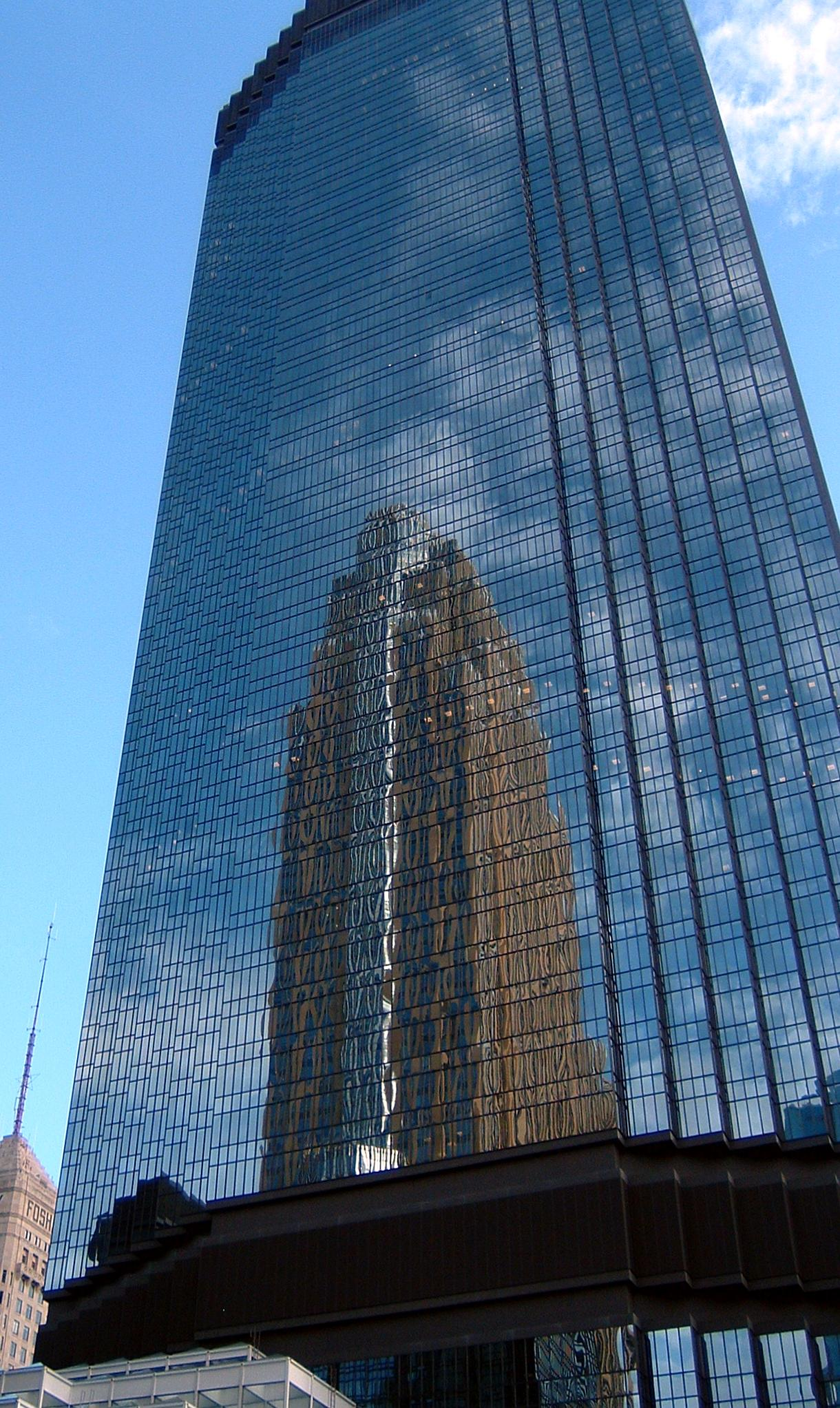
The IDS Center with the Wells Fargo Center reflected in its windows.

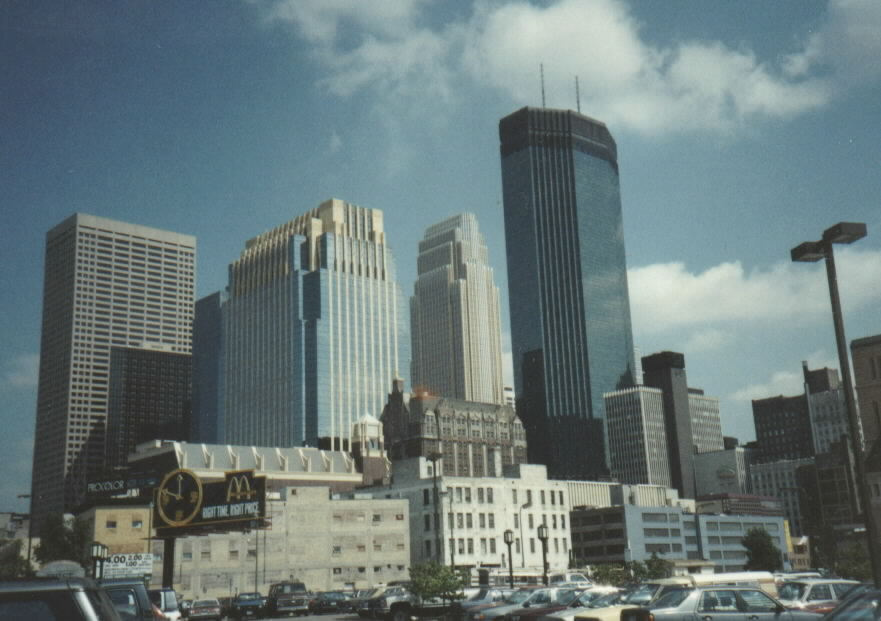
Skyline of Minneapolis in 1991

While the destruction of the Gateway district left a large gap in downtown Minneapolis, other developments would reshape it and transform the skyline. One of these developments was the building of the Nicollet Mall in 1968. Previously known as Nicollet Avenue, the portion within the central business became a tree-lined mall for pedestrians and transit. The mall forms a kind of linear park, with trees and fountains and a farmers' market in the summer. It also boosted the city's retail trade. The most dramatic change to the skyline came in 1974, when the IDS Center was opened. At a height of 775 feet 6 inches (236.37 m) when built, it dwarfed the previous highest building, the Foshay Tower. Other additions to downtown included the Multifoods Tower (668 feet; 204 m) in 1983 now known as 33 South Sixth, Norwest Center, built in 1988 and now renamed the Wells Fargo Center, the Campbell Mithun Tower—previously Piper Jaffray built in 1985, and Capella Tower, built in 1992 as the headquarters of First Bank. The Hubert H. Humphrey Metrodome, opened in 1982 and demolished in 2014, served as the home of the Minnesota Vikings and previously hosted the Minnesota Twins, and the Minnesota Golden Gophers football team. Now on the site is U.S. Bank Stadium, home of the Minnesota Vikings, host of Super Bowl LII, and the 2019 Final Four. In the 1990s, the last wave of downtown development filled in parcels around the skyscrapers with towers 40 stories or less from companies such as Target, Ameriprise Financial, and AT&T.

Vertical residential housing also followed the corporate development. The 1970s condo boom saw many discreet high-rises blanket the former milling districts and Downtown West. Riverside Plaza, formerly Cedar Square West, was completed in 1973 as a six tower mixed-income self-contained urban village that originally was much larger and contains the tallest buildings outside Downtown. The plain modern and brutalist concrete styles of that period however were contrasted in the late 1990s to 2000s that brought in more prominent residential towers to the skyline with varying colors and architecture themes. The Carlyle residence one block south of the Mississippi River is 41 stories built in art deco style and is the most recent addition to the skyline. Grant Park and Skyscape, though not as tall at 27–28 stories, have begun extending the skyline south into the Elliot Park neighborhood. The two contrast as one is traditional with red brick proportions while the other is in modern glass.

== 21st century ==
Light rail made its debut in Minneapolis with the opening of the Blue Line on June 26, 2004. This line, part of the Metro system, starts in downtown Minneapolis and progresses southeastward along Minnesota State Highway 55 (also known as Hiawatha Avenue), passes Minnehaha Park on the west side, and serves the Minneapolis–Saint Paul International Airport before it terminates at the Mall of America in Bloomington. In 2014, service began on the Green Line which connects downtown with the University of Minnesota and downtown St. Paul.

=== Rediscovering the riverfront ===
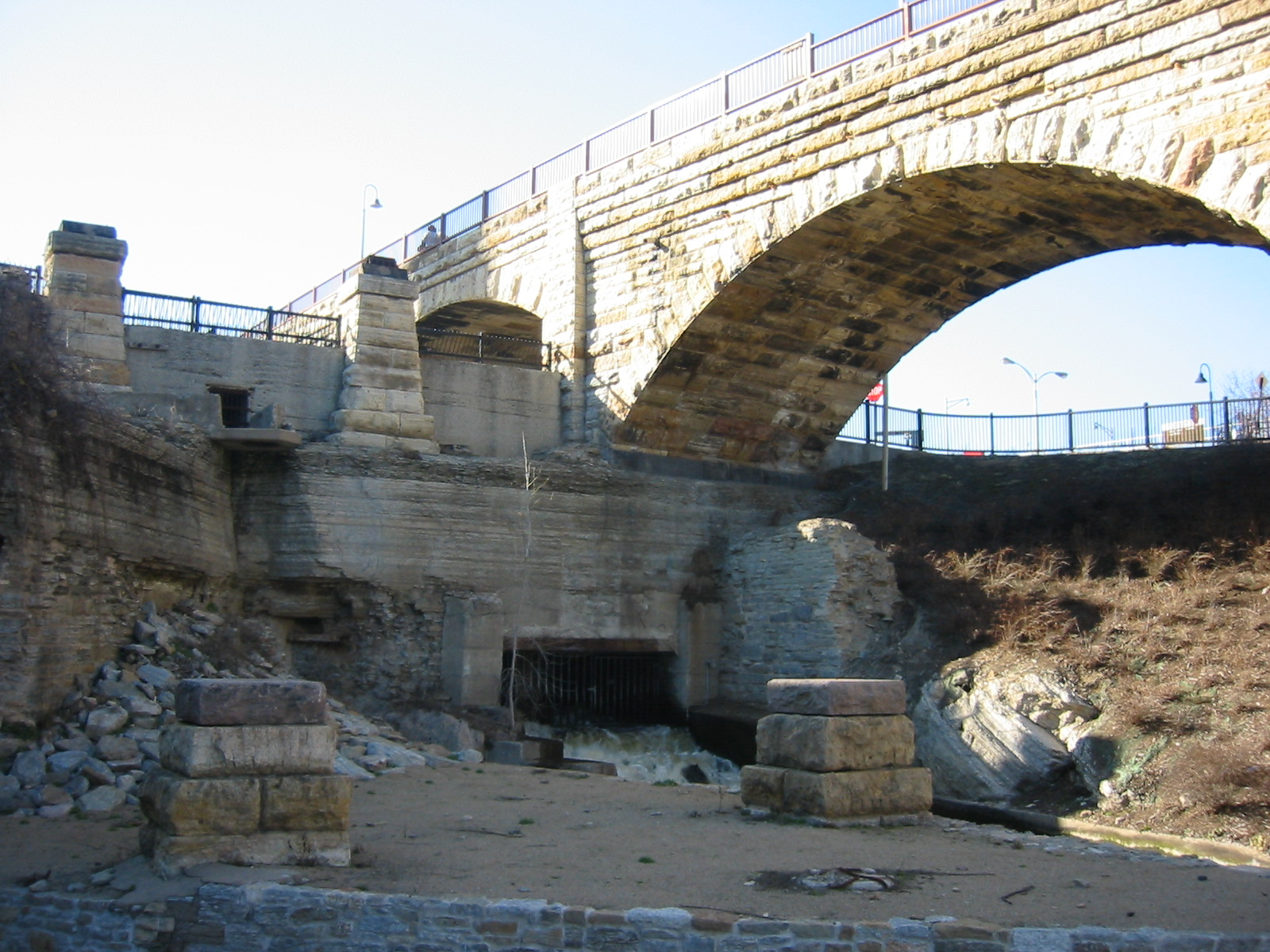
The output of the tailrace canal at Mill Ruins Park, with the Stone Arch Bridge above and to the right.

Hitherto "the backside of the city", the riverfront caught the attention of a convoluted network of private and government interests who sometimes fought. They developed townhouses and high rises, and rebuilt and renovated lofts—often neglecting affordability—revitalizing mills on both banks. The Minneapolis Park and Recreation Board acquired land along the river banks, including much of Nicollet Island, all of Boom Island, and the West River Parkway corridor. These properties were developed with trails and parkways, and this spurred the development of private land adjacent to the riverfront, creating the new Mill District neighborhood. The Stone Arch Bridge was opened to pedestrian traffic in 1994, creating a link in the trail system and providing extensive views of Saint Anthony Falls. Some of the old commercial buildings were adapted to new uses. The Whitney Hotel was built in what used to be the Standard Mill, while the North Star Lofts was a new use for the former North Star Woolen Mills building. Other projects, such as Saint Anthony Main and a number of condominium and townhouse projects, provide residents with the opportunity to live within view of Saint Anthony Falls.

Urban archeology along the riverfront has uncovered remnants of the flour mills built in the 1860s and 1870s, along with the headrace canal that once supplied water to the mills and the trestle supports for the Minnesota Eastern Railroad. These ruins, which had once been buried with gravel and fill, are now open to the public as Mill Ruins Park. The park has signs interpreting the history of the area and the buildings that had once been there. The Washburn "A" Mill, severely damaged by an 1891 fire but now stabilized, now hosts the Mill City Museum, opened in 2003 by the Minnesota Historical Society. The museum presents a history of flour milling and industrial development along the river, and an eight-story elevator ride shows the various steps that turned wheat into flour. The Guthrie Theater moved to a new building along the riverfront in 2006, just southeast of the Mill City Museum.

=== Confronting structural racism ===
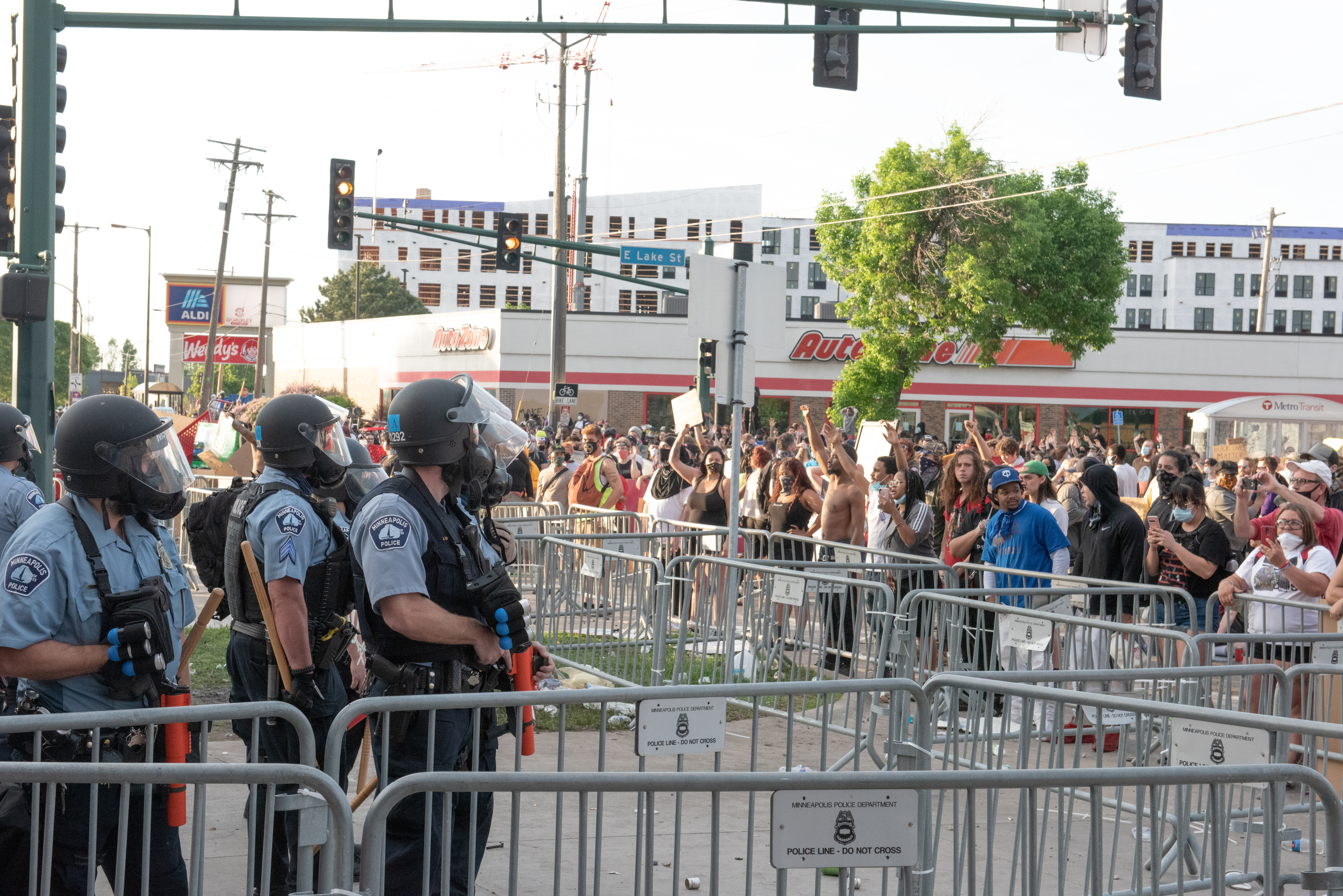
Police and protesters stand off outside the third precinct station in Minneapolis on May 27, 2020

By the 21st century, Minneapolis was home to some of the largest racial disparities in the United States. The city's population of people of color and Indigenous people fared worse than the city's white population for many measures of well-being, such as health outcomes, academic achievement, income, and homeownership. As a result of discriminatory policies and racism throughout the city's history, racial disparities were described as the most significant issue facing Minneapolis in the first decades of the 21st century.

==== 2010s ====
In the 2010s, several deaths of black men in Minneapolis and the metropolitan region by police officers brought issues of structural racism to the city's forefront. In 2015, the shooting of Jamar Clark, a black man, by a Minneapolis police officer led to controversy; it was later determined that the officers had acted in self-defense and no charges were filed. In 2016, the shooting of Philando Castile, a black man, in nearby Falcon Heights ended with a jury acquittal for the involved officer.

==== 2020s ====
In May 2020, following the murder of George Floyd, a black man, while under custody of Minneapolis police officers, protests exploded throughout the Minneapolis-St. Paul metropolitan area. Some commentators blamed what they called a history of structural racism, lack of police accountability, state aggression against protest movements, and untenable social conditions in Minneapolis as contributing factors to the events that unfolded soon after Floyd's murder.

While many protesters and gatherings in May and June 2020 were peaceful, clashes between police forces and protesters culminated in three evenings from May 28 to May 30 of widespread property damage, looting, and fires, with the city's third precinct police station being abandoned by forces and overrun by protesters. Estimates of property damage were upwards of $500 million, making the unrest in the Minneapolis-St. Paul area the second most destructive in United States history, after the 1992 Los Angeles riots. Floyd's murder and the resulting unrest in Minneapolis inspired a global protest movement about structural racism and police brutality.

== See also ==
- Eastman tunnel
- St. Anthony Falls Historic District
- Saint Anthony Falls - Industry
- St. Anthony Falls Hydroelectric Development

== Primary sources ==
- Steffens, Lincoln, "The Shame of Minneapolis," McClure's (January 1903): 227–239. online
