= American Planning and Civic Association =

US organization

- Abbreviation: APCA
- Predecessor: American Civic Association
- Merged into: National Conference on City Planning
- Successor: National Urban Coalition
- Founder: J. Horace McFarland
- Type: Nonprofit
- Purpose: City Beautiful, urban planning, and conservation.
- President, 1910-1927: J. Horace McFarland
- President, 1927-1937: Frederic A. Delano
- Key people: Harlean James

The American Planning and Civic Association (APCA) was an American organization for improving living conditions in the United States, with an emphasis on improving the physical and structural growth of communities. Its purpose was briefly stated as "the cultivation of higher ideals of civic life and beauty in America, the promotion of city, town and neighborhood improvement, the preservation and development of landscape and the advancement of outdoor art." For the first ten years of its existence, it was known simply as the American Civic Association or ACA. The ACA was a municipal reform organization, and one of the few such organizations, national in its scope, that had no set parameters for its goals, but instead operated for the general betterment of municipal administration.

== History ==
In the latter part of the 19th century, rapid industrialism and urbanization had appeared to spawn an inordinate desire for material and commercial aggrandizement. Urban dwellers turned elsewhere to regenerate the spirit of man, and this they found in the wonders and beauties of nature which alone could "sustain life and make life worth sustaining." Many organizations arose in the larger cities to campaign for more city parks, new recreation areas, development of outdoor art, and the elimination of advertising billboards.

The American Park and Outdoor Art Association was established May 20, 1897 in Louisville, Kentucky, "to promote and conserve scenery and to secure and improve land for public parks."

=== Founding and the City Beautiful movement ===
In 1900, the American Park and Outdoor Art Association and other groups joined to form the American League for Civic Improvement, and four years later this group became the American Civic Association. J. Horace McFarland, a civic leader and newspaper editor in Harrisburg, Pennsylvania, spearheaded the Association's activities and broadened its scope of action to campaign for state and national parks.

The general offices of the American Civic Association were established in Washington, D.C., in January 1910. Its principal founding officers were J. Horace McFarland, President; Clinton Rogers Woodruff of Philadelphia, vice-president; William B. Howland of New York, treasurer; and Richard B. Watrous of Washington, secretary. Under McFarland's hand, and with the influence of powerful industrialist and conservationist Stephen Mather who was an ACA member, the organization was one of the big supporters of the United States' national park policy. The ACA was an early supporter of the push to have the national park system organized and administered under a single dedicated government body.

=== Merger with the National Conference on City Planning and urban Reform ===
In 1921, the American Civic Association and the National Conference on City Planning merged to become the American Planning and Civic Association. After the merger, the leadership changed. Frederic A. Delano became president and Harlean James was recruited to the role of executive director. The organization was well-connected nationally at the height of its activities. In 1926, its board included J. C. Nichols, John Nolen, Frederick Law Olmsted Jr., Lorado Taft, Eleanor Roosevelt, Harland Bartholomew, George Dealey, John Barton Payne, Vance C. McCormick, Albert Shaw (journalist), Henry Barnes (traffic engineer), Harold Caparn, Frank Albert Waugh, Charles H. Wacker, John Campbell Merriam, Warren H. Manning, Electus D. Litchfield, Maie Bartlett Heard, Alice Ames Winter, Caroline Bartlett Crane, and Henry Drinker.

Between 1923 and 1933, it was closely involved in the establishment of planning in Washington, D.C., and the implementation of the McMillan Plan. It ran several nationwide campaigns overseen by Harlean James. Given that the District of Columbia lacked self-government, they established "Federal City Committees" in multiple cities across the country to influence Congress. Within D.C. itself, they worked with the Washington Board of Trade to organize the Committee of 100 on the Federal City from elite Washingtonians, to exert social pressure on congressional representatives.

Their campaign was successful, leading to the creation of the National Capital Park Commission. The subsequently campaigned to expand its powers to form the National Capital Park and Planning Commission. Finally, their campaign would help pass a massive bond issuance, known as the Capper-Cramton Act, that funded park expansion across D.C.
