= Pugsley Medal =

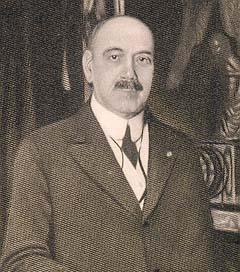
- Cornelius Amory Pugsley (1850-1936)
- Description: Honoring champions of parks and conservation
- Country: United States
- Presented by: American Academy for Park and Recreation Administration (AAPRA)

The Pugsley Medal was created by Cornelius Amory Pugsley in 1928. The award honors champions of parks and conservation.

Responsibility for selecting the recipients has shifted from the American Scenic and Historic Preservation Society to the National Park Foundation, and most recently to the American Academy for Park and Recreation Administration. Until 1952 there was a gold, silver, and bronze award, and in 1953 it was switched to national, state, and local.

== Pugsley Medal winners ==
- 1928 Stephen T. Mather, the first director of the National Park Service, gold medal
- 1928 Duncan McDuffie, silver medal
- 1929 Mary Williamson Averell, gold medal
- 1929 Nathaniel Lord Britton, silver medal
- 1931 Richard Lieber, gold medal
- 1932 Peter Norbeck, silver medal
- 1935 John Hayes McLaren, silver medal
- 1936 Robert Moses, gold medal
- 1937 J. Horace McFarland, gold medal
- 1938 Arno B. Cammerer, gold medal
- 1940 Newton B. Drury, silver medal
- 1942 Harold L. Ickes, gold medal
- 1942 Harlean James, bronze medal
- 1947 Conrad L. Wirth, gold medal
- 1947 Thomas J. Allen, silver medal
- 1948 Percival Proctor Baxter, gold medal
- 1949 Waldo Leland, gold medal
- 1950 Newton B. Drury, gold medal
- 1952 Harlean James, gold medal
- 1953 Frederick Law Olmsted Jr., gold medal
- 1954 Harold C. Bryant, national award
- 1954 Russell Reid, silver award
- 1955 Loring McMillen, local award
- 1956 Gilbert Hovey Grosvenor, national award
- 1959 Alfred A. Knopf, national award
- 1962 Allen T. Edmunds, gold award
- 1962 Charles Alvin DeTurk, silver award
- 1962 Frank G. McInnis, bronze award
- 1963 Conrad L. Wirth, national award
- 1965 Harold P. Fabian, gold award
- 1965 U.W. Hella, silver award
- 1965 Daniel L. Flaherty, bronze award
- 1970 Robert W. Ruhe
- 1982 John A. Townsley,
- 1991 Denis P. Galvin, national award
- 1993 Andrew Sansom
- 2006 Bill Lane

== See also ==
- List of environmental awards
