= Robert W. Ruhe =

Swiss-born American architect (1863–1949)

- Born: 1923; St. Louis, Missouri
- Died: 1986

Robert W. Ruhe (1923–1986) was the superintendent of the Minneapolis Park and Recreation Board in Minneapolis from 1966 until he retired in 1978.

== Family, education, and early career ==
Ruhe was born in St. Louis, Missouri. He served in the US Navy from 1943 to 1945. He earned a B.S. in commerce from St. Louis University in 1947, and an M.S. in recreation from Indiana University in 1952. Ruhe married Elva Jane Buckingham in 1950 and they had two sons. Ruhe served as director of parks and recreation in La Porte, Indiana and Skokie, Illinois.

== Minneapolis career ==
Ruhe accepted the job of superintendent of parks in Minneapolis when that city's park board and staff was in disarray from top to bottom. His strong leadership stopped other agencies, such as the Minnesota highway department, from taking parkland for their projects, a disagreement the park board eventually helped win in a landmark US Supreme Court ruling Citizens to Preserve Overton Park v. Volpe. During a period of Great Society government spending, he was able to increase the park system's budget and ability to sell bonds.

Ruhe is remembered for transforming the Minneapolis park system into a resource for everyone, in place of an elitist service for the wealthy. According to the American Academy for Park and Recreation, under his leadership the park system built "37 miles of parkways, 48 recreation centers, 27 miles of bike trails, 14 parks, 10 tot-lots, 13 new park-school centers, and two swimming pools".

After only four years on the job, Ruhe won the national Pugsley Medal from the American Academy for Park and Recreation Administration.

== Bibliography ==
- Smith, David C. (2008). City of Parks: The Story of Minneapolis Parks. Foundation for Minneapolis Parks. ISBN 978-0-615-19535-3.
