= Harlean James =

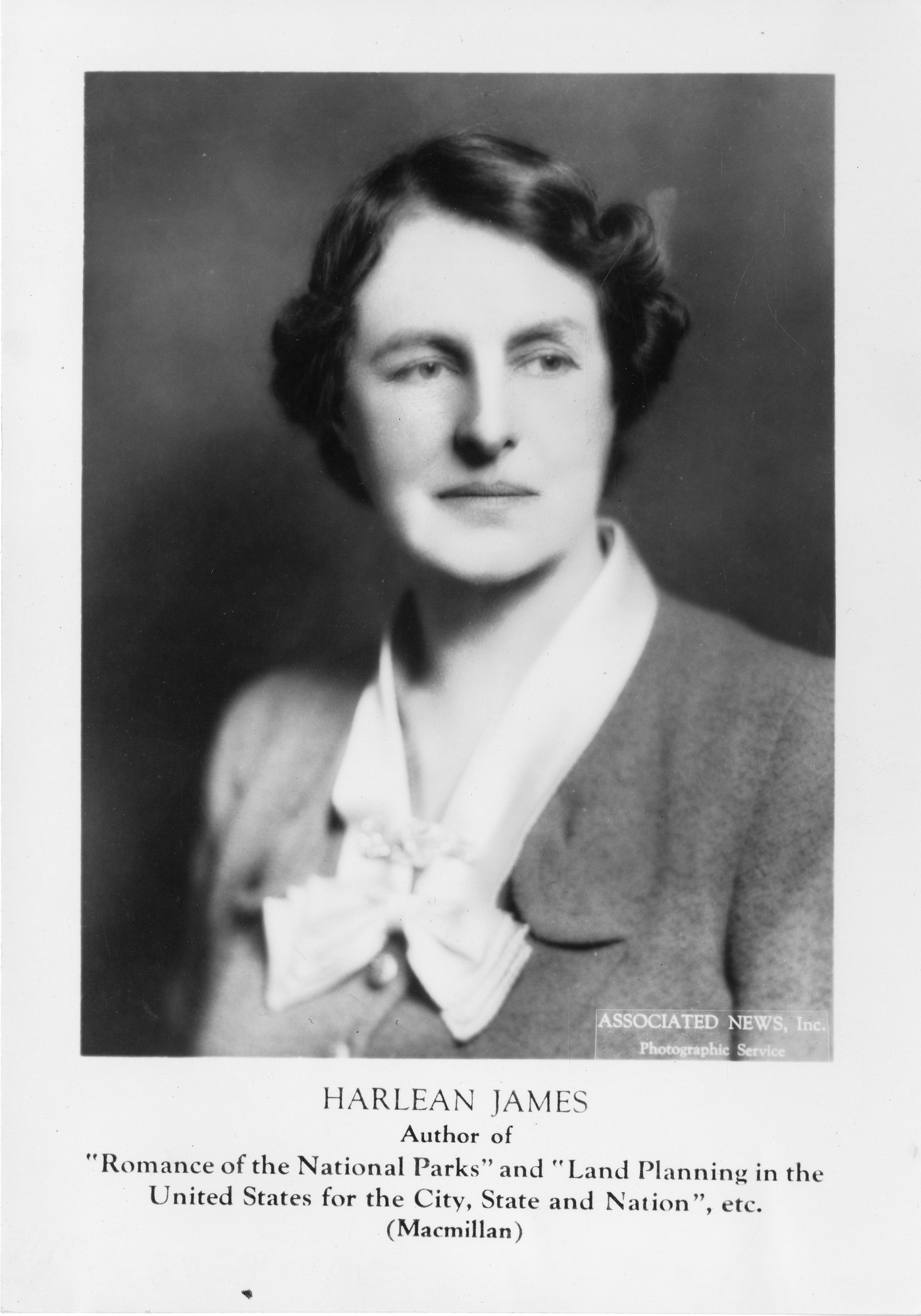
- Occupations: Executive Secretary of the American Planning and Civic Association, Executive Secretary of the National Conference on State Parks

Harlean James (1877–1969) was the executive secretary of the American Planning and Civic Association, executive secretary of the National Conference on State Parks. She advocated for the expansion of parks in the United States and was awarded the Cornelius Amory Pugsley Bronze Medal Award in 1942, followed by the Cornelius Amory Pugsley Gold Medal Award in 1952 for her "years of devoted service in the interest of America's parks."

== Life and career ==
James was born in Mattoon, Illinois in 1877. She received her B.A. degree in history from Stanford University in 1898. After undertaking graduate studies at the University of Chicago and Columbia University, James worked as a court reporter and private secretary for the collector of customs in Honolulu (1903–1904). She then became the general manager of the California and Hawaiian Sugar Refining Co. in San Francisco (1905–1906), before serving as the corporate secretary of the J.B. Castle companies in Honolulu from 1906 to 1908.

Starting in 1911, Harlean James served as executive secretary of Women's Civic League in Baltimore. She held this position until 1916. Following this role, she served as the executive secretary of the Housing Section of the National Council of Defense. Her next positions included executive secretary of the United States Housing Corporation within the Department of Labor (1918) and general manager of the Government Hotels for women from 1919 to 1920. James was brought into this position by Frederic Adrian Delano and managed the halls that were positioned between Union Station and the Capitol.

James began her 37-year tenure in national planning and parks in 1921; she served first as the executive secretary of the American Civic Association. In 1935, the Civic Association merged with the National Conference on City Planning to form the American Planning and Civic Association and James continued to manage the organization as executive secretary. She secured financial support for American Civic Association from the Russell Sage Foundation, ensuring it remained financially viable. Also in 1935, James took on the role of executive secretary of the National Conference on State Parks. She remained in that position until 1958.

Furthermore, James was involved in the President's Conference on Home Building and Home Ownership as the chairperson of the committee on organization programs and as the secretary of the committee on education and service. She also served as the secretary-treasurer of the Joint Commission on the National Capital and as a consultant to the Defense Housing Coordinator in the office of Emergency Management (1941). Additionally, James was involved in the establishment of the Appalachian Trail, organizing the first Appalachian Trail Conference in Washington, D.C. in 1925 at the request of Benton MacKaye and his supporters.

== Awards and Commendations ==
James received the Pugsley Bronze Medal Award in 1942, then became the second woman recipient of the Pugsley Gold Medal Award (1952).

She received the outstanding service award from the American Society of Planning Officials in 1954. James was also appointed an honorary vice president of the American Foresting Association. Furthermore, she was inducted into several groups including the American Institute of Planners, American Society of Landscape Architects, and the American Institute of Architects.

In 1990, Harlean James was designated a National Planning Pioneer by the American Planning Association.

== Works ==
James wrote extensively on cities, parks, and planning. Her Romance of the National Parks (1939) is credited, along with planning conferences of which she was part, with spurring the expansion of the national park system.

James's notable works include: As author

- The Building of Cities (1916)
- Land Planning in the U.S. for the City, State and Nation (1926)
- Romance of the National Parks (1939)

As editor

- What About the Year 2000? (1929)
- The American Planning and Civic Association's Annuals (1927–57)
- 25th Anniversary Yearbook on Park and Recreation Progress (1942)

James also was associate editor of Federal Affairs in National Municipal Review and the New Washington and Civic Art section of the American Magazine of Art; and contributed a number of entries to the Encyclopædia Britannica.
