= Waugh =

Waugh is a surname, pronounced /ˈwɑː/ or /ˈwɔː/ – or the Scots pronunciation sounding like Woch as in the Scots loch ('lake') – derived from the proto-Germanic *Walhaz. Notable people with the name include:

- Ainsley Waugh (born 1981), Jamaican athlete
- Alexander Waugh (1754–1827), minister in the Secession Church of Scotland
- Andrew Scott Waugh (1810–1878), British Indian surveyor
- Arthur Waugh (1866–1943), English author and publisher (father of Alec and Evelyn)
  - Alec Waugh (1898–1981), British novelist
  - Evelyn Waugh (1903–1966), British novelist
    - Auberon Waugh (1939–2001), British journalist and satirist (father of Alexander and Daisy)
      - Alexander Waugh (1963–2024), British writer and journalist
      - Daisy Waugh (born 1967), British novelist and journalist
- Arthur Waugh (priest) (1840–1922), English Anglican cleric
- Arthur Waugh (civil servant) (1891–1968), British civil servant in India and folklorist
- Arthur James Waugh (1909–1995)), Lord Mayor of Coventry
- Barratt Waugh (born 1979), British countertenor singer
- Benjamin Waugh (1839–1908), Victorian social reformer
- Beverly Waugh (1789–1858), American bishop
- Brian Kynaston Waugh (1922–1984), New Zealand aircraft designer
- Bronagh Waugh (born 1982), a Northern Irish actress
- Catherine Waugh McCulloch (1862–1945), American lawyer and suffragist
- Clifton Waugh (born 1972), Jamaican footballer
- David Waugh (1866–unknown), English footballer
- Daniel Waugh (historian), American academic from Washington
- Daniel W. Waugh (1842–1921), American politician from Indiana
- Dean Waugh (born 1969), Australian cricketer, brother of Mark and Steve
- Derek Waugh (born 1971), American athletics director
- Ed Waugh, British dramatist
- Edward "Terry" Walter Rail Waugh (1913–1966), South African architect
- Edwin Waugh (1817–1890), English poet
- Frank Albert Waugh (1869–1943), American landscape architect, father of Frederick
  - Albert E. Waugh (1903–1985), American economist and university provost, son of Frank
  - Frederick V. Waugh (1898–1974), American agricultural economist, son of Frank
    - Margaret Maxfield (née Waugh, 1926–2016), American mathematician, daughter of Frederick
- Fred Waugh (1869–1919), Australian footballer
- Geoff Waugh (born 1983), Canadian-Croatian ice hockey player
- Hillary Waugh (1920–2008), American mystery novelist
- Howard Waugh (1931–2009)), Canadian football player
- Hubert Waugh (1898–1954), English cricketer
- Ida Waugh (1846–1919), American illustrator
- James Waugh (disambiguation), multiple individuals
- Jeff Waugh, Australian software engineer
- Jewell Waugh (1910–2006), American politician
- Jim Waugh (1933–2010), American baseball player
- Jimmy Waugh (1898–1968)), British footballer
- Joan Waugh, American historian
- John Waugh (disambiguation), multiple individuals
- Joseph Waugh (born 1952), British cyclist
- Joseph Laing Waugh (1868–1928), Scottish businessman and writer
- Keith Waugh (born 1956), English-born footballer
- Kevin Waugh (born 1955 or 1956), Canadian politician and television sports journalist
- Kim Waugh, Australian horse trainer
- Mark Waugh (born 1965), Australian cricketer, brother of Steve
- Maury Waugh, American football coach
- Mike Waugh (1955–2014), American politician
- Michael Waugh (artist), American artist known for satirical drawings
- Norman Waugh (1874–1934)), Australian rules footballer
- Patricia Waugh (born 1956), English literary critic, Professor of English at Durham University
- Phil Waugh (born 1979), Australian rugby player
- Pia Waugh (born 1979), Australian policy advisor
- Reuben Waugh (1875–1945), Canadian politician
- Richard Deans Waugh (1868–1938), Canadian politician
- Richard E. Waugh (born 1947), Deputy Chairman of Scotiabank
- Ric Roman Waugh (born 1968), American film director
- Richard Waugh (born 1961), voice actor
- Robert T. Waugh (1919–1944), American Army Officer, Medal of Honor recipient
- Russell Waugh (born 1941), Australian cricketer
- Samuel Waugh (1814–1885), American painter
  - Frederick Judd Waugh (1861–1940), American marine painter and camouflage artist, son of Samuel
    - Coulton Waugh (1896–1973), British cartoonist, painter and author, son of Frederick
- Samuel C. Waugh (1890–1970), American banker, government official
- Scott L. Waugh (born 1948), American historian and academic administrator
- Scott Waugh (born 1970 or 1971), American film director
- Sidney Waugh (1904–1963), American sculptor
- Steve Waugh (born 1965), Australian cricketer, brother of Mark
- Sylvia Waugh (born 1935), British children's writer
- Sir Telford Waugh (1865–1950)), British diplomat
- Thomas Frederick Waugh, Canadian politician
- Thomas Waugh (born 1948), Canadian critic and film studies professor
- Warwick Waugh (born 1968), Australian rugby player
- Warren Waugh (born 1980), English footballer
- William Waugh (disambiguation), multiple people

== See also ==
- Dhondia Wagh (died 1800), also known as Dhoondiah Waugh, Indian soldier
