= Arthur Waugh (disambiguation) =

Arthur Waugh (1866–1943) was a British author and father of Alec Waugh and Evelyn Waugh.

Arthur Waugh may also refer to:

- Arthur Waugh (priest) (1840–1922), Anglican priest
- Arthur Waugh (civil servant) (1891–1968), British civil servant in India and folklorist
- Arthur James Waugh (1909–1995), British politician

== See also ==
- Waugh (surname)
