= A Little Lower than the Angels =

1942 historical fiction novel by Virginia Sorensen

A Little Lower Than the Angels
- First edition
- Author: Virginia Sorensen
- Publisher: Alfred A. Knopf
- ISBN: 1-56085-103-1

A Little Lower Than the Angels is a historical fiction novel by Virginia Sorensen, published in 1942 by Alfred A. Knopf. This was Sorensen's first novel, and it received attention for its lyrical prose and treatment of Mormon history, especially regarding polygamy. The phrase "Lower than the angels" is a reference to Psalm 8:5.

== Synopsis ==
The novel is told from the perspectives of several different characters, from the fictional character Mercy Baker to the character based on the real-life Joseph Smith.

Mercy and Simon Baker arrive in Nauvoo, Illinois, with their three children and another on the way. On the boggy banks of the Mississippi River, the Mormon community is plagued by "swamp fever", and their eldest son, Jarvie, soon falls ill with the same disease. Joseph Smith arrives and, along with Simon and other men, gives Jarvie a blessing, to no effect. Mercy goes out into the woods to collect herbs for her son, and suddenly gives birth there. She brings the baby and her scavenged medicine home to find that Jarvie is already getting better. Mercy slowly recovers, while her friends Eliza Snow and Joseph Smith draw closer.

Joseph announces the doctrine of polygamy to the brethren of the church, and then directly goes to propose it to Eliza. Mercy witnesses the sealing ceremony of Eliza and Joseph, but is very uncomfortable with the idea of polygamy and feels that her friend Eliza is being taken advantage of. Jarvie and the family's maid, Vic, become romantically involved, but Vic is banished when Simon catches the two of them together. Meanwhile, Emma Smith learns about her husband's multiple wives and feels betrayed, especially by her friend Eliza.

Joseph Smith is imprisoned and killed after ordering the destruction of a printing press, and church leadership transitions to Brigham Young. Mercy continually gets pregnant and gives birth, with recovery taking longer each time. She gives birth to twins, which leaves her weak, and when one of the twin girls dies, she is unable to manage the house. Brigham Young tells Simon Baker that he should take on a second wife, Charlot, who arrives in the Baker home under the pretense of a housekeeper. Jarvie catches his father and Charlot together and puts up a strong resistance against Charlot's rule over the household. Mercy, feeling better one morning, gets out of bed to find that Simon was sleeping with Charlot. Realizing that the only way she can retain power in her family and her marriage is to play along, Mercy maintains a tense relationship with her new sister-wife.

Mobs begin setting fire to homes, including the Bakers', and they are forced to move into Charlot's house. Brigham Young eventually makes the call for the members to abandon their homes and go west. The Baker family packs up and leaves in their wagons, but as they pass their old, burned-down home, Mercy dies.

== Development ==
The Bakers are based on Sorensen's great-grandparents. Her great-grandfather, Simon Peter Eggertsen, was the inspiration for the character Mercy. The historical characters—Joseph Smith, Eliza R. Snow, Emma Smith, and Brigham Young—were based on research that Sorensen did while living in Terre Haute, Indiana, across the state from Nauvoo, Illinois.

The version of the novel picked up by Knopf had no capitalization or punctuation (Sorensen explained she "had such a romance with e.e. cummings"); the published version returned to standard usage.

== Themes ==
Sorensen used the novelty of polygamy in Mormonism to draw readers to the novel. According to Stephen Carter, her biographer, She discusses the growth that comes from change and love, which is seen when Joseph Smith introduces the doctrine of plural marriage to Simon Baker and Eliza Snow. Sorensen also contrasts Mercy and Simon in their faith—Simon is devoted to the church while Mercy follows along because she is devoted to her husband. LuDene Dallimore wrote that Mercy "[represents] a kind of spiritual life that is opposed to the spirit of religion". Rather than creating an argument about the truth of Mormonism, Sorensen rather focuses on the effects that the religion has on its people.

== Publication ==
By May 1942, 7,800 copies had been sold. Sales were far lower in Utah, and Deseret Book did not distribute the novel. The success of the novel outside of Utah was credited in some part to the open way Sorensen portrayed this early Mormon culture in a human, unthreatening way. According to publisher Alfred A. Knopf, "General Readers who, at the time, did not have a favorable impression of Mormons, could read the novel knowing that it did not require them to accept the doctrines of the Church because the central character, with whom readers most closely identify, is not a believer."

== Reception ==
Sorensen's books were not well-received in Utah. A Little Lower Than the Angels received a negative review by Latter-Day Saint Apostle John A. Widtsoe in his editorial in the Improvement Era magazine's book review section. He found the writing to be unengaging, and Sorensen's portrayal of Joseph Smith was weak. The novel was successful outside of Utah and received positive reviews in several East Coast magazines and newspapers, including reviews by Milton Rugoff in the New York Herald Tribune and Walter Prescott in The New York Times.

Critic Lewis Gannet praised Sorensen's ability to "write stories within the longer narrative so complete they could stand alone". Helynne Hansen wrote: "Sorensen's creativity in allowing readers to see the true sentiments and perceptions beneath the surface of male-dominated doctrines, and beyond the silences of courageous women, is an early foray into the now-prolific realm of feminist language and expression" or Écriture féminine.
