= Nişantaşı Anatolian High School =

Coordinates: 41°03′13″N 28°59′38″E

- Nişantaşı Anadolu Lisesi
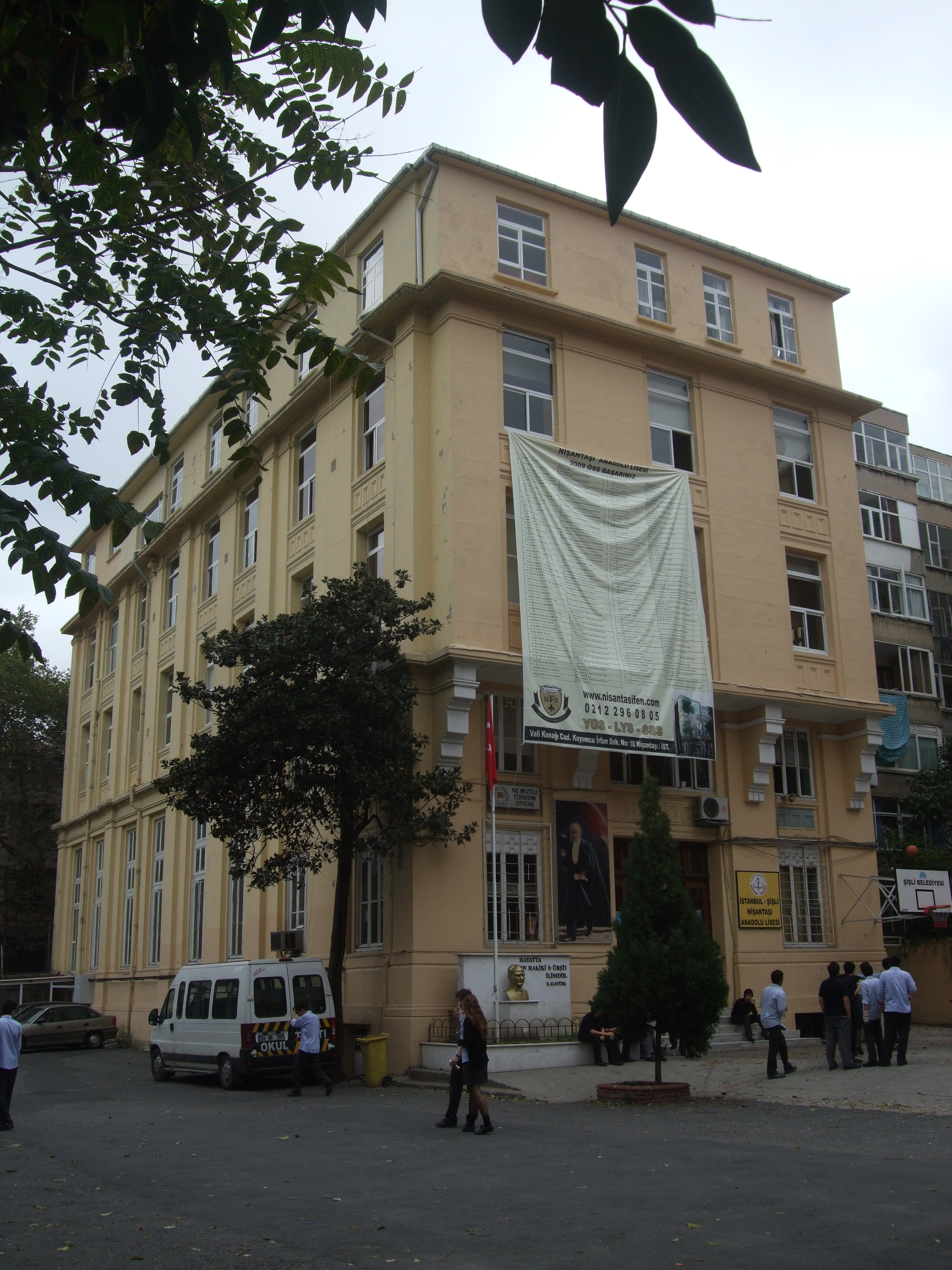
- The façade of the school building.
- Teşvikiye Vali Konağı Caddesi No: 65; Istanbul

Information
- Former name: English High School for Boys (1905-1979)
- Type: Public
- Established: 1905; 121 years ago
- Founder: Sir Telford Waugh
- CEEB code: 696374
- Headmaster: Ertan Demirtaş
- Grades: Prep, 9–12
- Gender: Co-educational
- Language: Turkish, English
- Campus: Nişantaşı
- Student Union/Association: English High School'lular Derneği
- Color: Blue White
- Affiliation: The Duke of Edinburgh's Award
- Historical Houses: Arden, Charnwood, Dean and Sherwood
- Website: nisantasial.meb.k12.tr

Nişantaşı Anatolian High School (Turkish: Nişantaşı Anadolu Lisesi) is a public high school located in Vali Konağı Caddesi, Nişantaşı, Istanbul. The institution known as English High School for Boys (EHSB), was a British private school operating since 1905. Initially founded as the English High School for Girls in 1849, the school expanded in 1905 to include the English High School for Boys, collectively offering an English curriculum. The schools were notable for their shared British curriculum and were divided into four student groups: Arden House, Charnwood House, Dean House, and Sherwood House. A distinctive feature of both schools was their common logo, which included a blue wolf and crescent, and a separate blue rose emblem. In 1979, management of the school was transferred to Turkish Ministry of National Education.

== History ==
The foundations of Nişantaşı Anatolian High School date back to 1849 when Lady Stratford Redcliffe, the wife of Lord Stratford Redcliffe, the British Ambassador in Istanbul, established a girls' school in Beyoğlu. The school initially served as an English Girls' High School, admitting students of various nationalities and receiving praise from Sultan Abdülmecid. The building was donated to the British Embassy by Lady Redcliffe during the Crimean War after the school was closed for six years.

Post-Crimean War, the school reopened in 1881, and by then, it accommodated up to two hundred students. Further developments occurred in 1905 when the school administration, influenced by the need to provide quality education to the children of foreigners, particularly the British community in Istanbul, established a Boys School in Beyoğlu with a headmaster and deputy headmaster from England. Teachers for French and Turkish were also recruited locally.

The school, initially named English High School Boys, began operations in a building established by the British Vice-Consul Sir Telford Waugh in the Kuledibi District near Galata. Sultan Abdülhamid II later donated a plot in Firuzağa for the school, but it was deemed unsuitable. On April 12, 1911, Sultan Mehmet V allocated a five-story wooden building in Teşvikiye exclusively for school use.

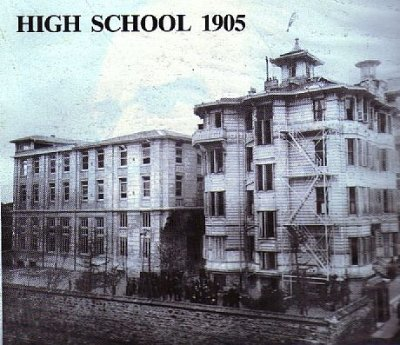
English High School for Boys (currently Nişantaşı Anatolian High School) Building in Istanbul

The school, however, suffered a major setback due to a fire in 1920 and faced financial difficulties during its reconstruction. It remained under the stewardship of Whitthall, the Chairman of the Board of Trustees, until 1930. With the enactment of the Tevhid-i Tedrisat Law on March 3, 1924, the school came under the control of the Turkish Republic, and on November 21, 1946, the management of the schools was transferred to the British Society, based in Istanbul.

Post-World War II, the school resumed operations both as a boarding and day school, which led to an increase in student enrollment and the need for additional buildings. In 1951, the school achieved high school status, and permission for additional construction was granted in 1955, resulting in the expansion of the primary school to what became known as English High School for Boys. Due to financial difficulties, the school had to abandon this status between 1966 and 1969.

On October 24, 1971, Queen Elizabeth II, Prince Philip, Duke of Edinburgh and Princess Anne visited the school. Despite financial support calls from the British Consulate from 1973 onwards, continuing financial difficulties led to the transfer of the school to the Ministry of National Education on October 1, 1979, after an agreement between Turkish Education Minister Necdet Uğur and British Ambassador Derek Dodson. Following this, the school was renamed Nişantaşı Anadolu Lisesi.

== Alumni association ==
The English High School Old Boys Association was founded in 1958 by Biltin Toker, Selçuk Erez, Emre Kökmen, Ersan İlal, Metin Tokpınar, and Coşkun Erkam. In 1962, with the approval of Miss Thompson, the association expanded to include graduates from the English High School for Girls and was renamed "The EHS Former Pupils Association." By 1970, the association had reached an active membership of 600. However, due to new regulations introduced in 1980, the association, like many others, was forced to dissolve.

In 1989, the association was re-established by a larger group led by Mükerrem Hiç and Teoman Yelkencioğlu, now including graduates from the schools that had transitioned to the Anatolian High School status, known as Nişantaşı Anatolian High School and Beyoğlu Anatolian High School, in addition to the alumni of the original English High School Boys and Girls. The newly formed "English High School Alumni Association" aimed to foster solidarity and communication among all alumni.

In the early years, the association met in a rented space in Levent but later purchased a three-story building in Arnavutköy in 1995 following a successful fundraising campaign titled High School'lular Evi."This building was initially furnished to meet urgent needs and was gradually renovated to become a pleasant gathering place for alumni.

== Notable alumni ==
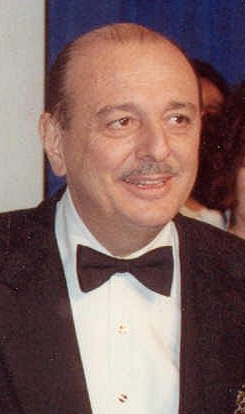
Arif Mardin, Turkish-American music producer

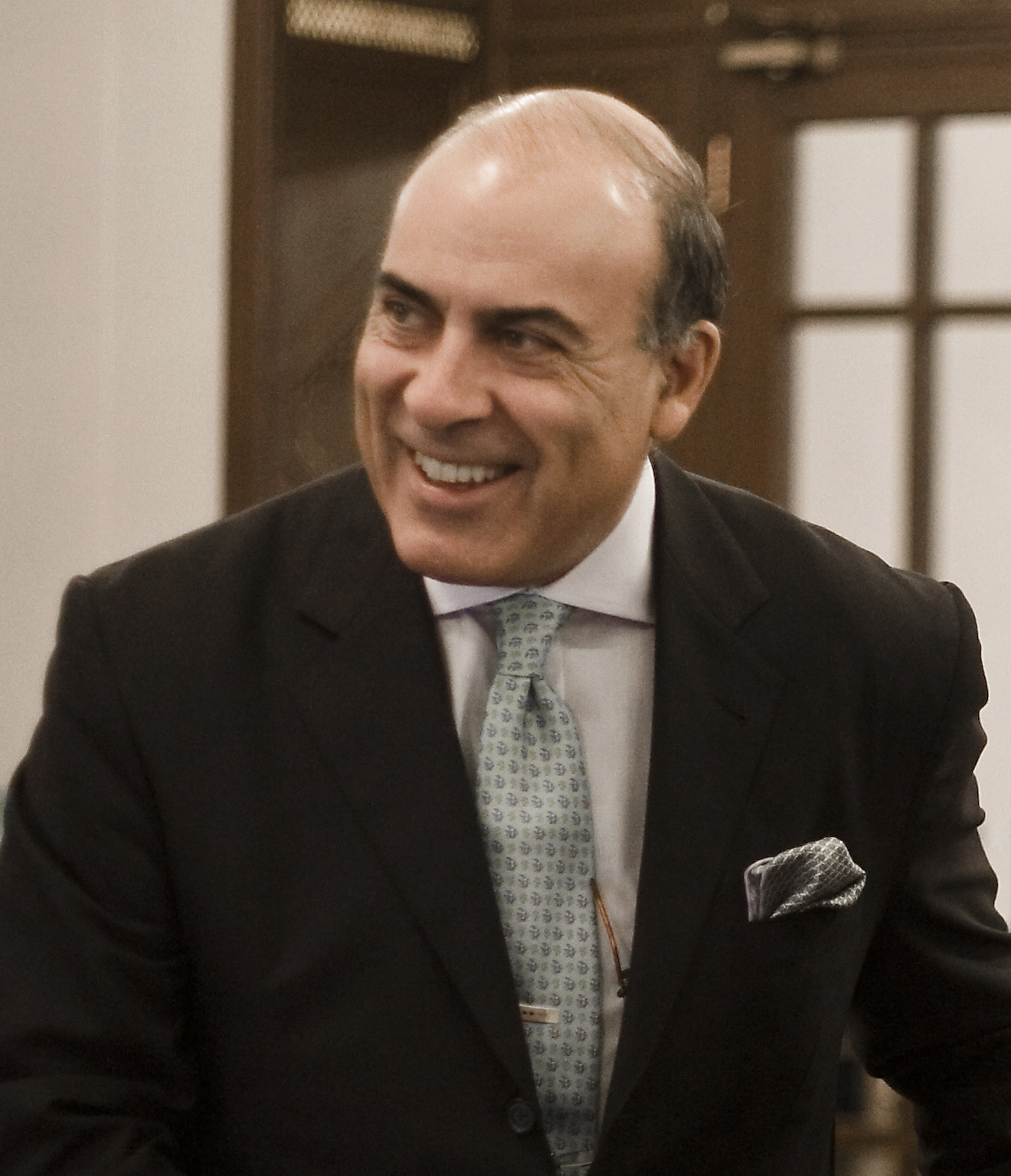
Muhtar Kent, Former chairman and CEO of The Coca-Cola Company

- Suat Hayri Ürgüplü (EHSB Class of 1912) — 11th Prime Minister of Turkey
- Fred Burla (EHSB Class of 1930) — Founder of Burla Brothers Co.
- Ercüment Karacan (EHSB Class of 1930) — Owner of Milliyet
- M.Ali Turhan Akarca (EHSB Class of 1934) — Deputy of Muğla (1954-1960)
- Fuat Süren (EHSB Class of 1935) — Founder of Transtürk Inc.
- Altemur Kılıç (EHSB Class of 1936) — Author
- Mümtaz Kavalcıoğlu (EHSB Class of 1938) — Deputy of Kocaeli
- Şiar Yalçın (EHSB Class of 1939) — Author
- Ahmet Binbir (EHSB Class of 1943) — Founder of Otosan
- Güngör Dilmen (EHSB Class of 1948) — Playwright
- Arif Mardin (EHSB Class of 1949) — 11-times Grammy-winning producer
- Metin Tokpınar (EHSB Class of 1949) — GM of Industrial Development Bank of Turkey
- Aram Gülyüz (EHSB Class of 1949) — Director
- Ömer Madra (EHSB Class of 1961) — General Manager of Açık Radyo
- Muhtar Kent (EHSB Class of 1968) — Former CEO of The Coca-Cola Company
- Hakan Binbaşgil (EHSB Class of 1976) — General Manager of Akbank
- Cem Toker (EHSB Class of 1976) — Former leader of the Liberal Democratic Party
- İshak İbrahimzade (EHSB Class of 1982) — President of the Turkish Jewish Community
- Osman Kavala (EHSB Class of 1972) — Shareholder of Kavala Group and activist

Ambassadors

- Mehmet Semih Baydar (EHSB Class of 1935)
- Nazmi Akıman (EHSB Class of 1946)
- Üstün Dinçmen (EHSB Class of 1956)
- Onur Gökçe (EHSB Class of 1953)
- Kosta İvraki (EHSB Class of 1957)
- Günaltay Şıbay (EHSB Class of 1953)
- Tuncer Topur (EHSB Class of 1958)
- Alp Karaosmanoğlu (EHSB Class of 1958)
- Nabi Şensoy (EHSB Class of 1959)
- Rıza Türmen (EHSB Class of 1960)
- Müfit Özdeş (EHSB Class of 1961)
- Uğur Ziyal (EHSB Class of 1961)
- Tomur Bayer (EHSB Class of 1965)
- Umur Apaydın (EHSB Class of 1966)
- Selim Yenel (EHSB Class of 1973)

== See also ==
- Beyoğlu Anatolian High School (formerly English High School for Girls)
- British International School Istanbul
- Tarabya British Schools
