= Virginia Sorensen =

American novelist

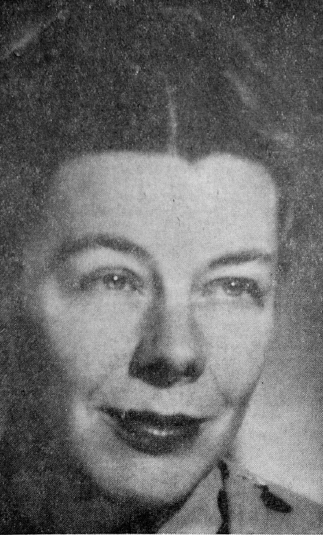
- Born: Virginia Louise Eggertsen; February 17, 1912; Provo, Utah
- Died: December 24, 1991 (aged 79); North Carolina
- Education: Brigham Young University
- Spouses: Frederick C. Sorensen (m. 1943; div. 1958) Alec Waugh (m. 1969; died 1981)
- Children: 2
- Writing career
- Years active: 1942–1978
- Notable awards: 1957 Newbery Medal

Virginia Louise Sorensen (née Eggertsen; February 17, 1912 – December 24, 1991), also credited as Virginia Sorenson, was an American regionalist writer. Her role in Utah and Mormon literature places her within the "lost generation" of Mormon writers. She was awarded the 1957 Newbery Medal for her children's novel, Miracles on Maple Hill.

== Biography ==
Virginia Sorensen was born on February 17, 1912, to Helen El Deva Blackett and Claud E. Eggertsen in Provo, Utah, but grew up in Manti and American Fork, Utah. Her parents were descended from Mormon pioneers; her mother identified as a Christian Scientist, while Sorensen described her father as a Jack Mormon. Because of this, she wrote from a liminal position between Mormon and mainstream western American life. Of this circumstance, she said of her siblings and herself, "We all felt obliged to be especially good and bright because our parents weren't active church people." From an early age, she wrote poetry and told stories to friends and family.

She attended Brigham Young University, where she met her first husband, Frederick C. Sorensen, who taught English at a local high school. She graduated from BYU with a bachelor's degree in journalism. The couple moved several times throughout their 25 years of marriage for Frederick's work. While living in Terre Haute, Indiana, where Frederick was a professor at what is now Indiana State University, Sorensen published her first novel, A Little Lower Than the Angels. In 1954, Sorensen stayed at MacDowell Colony in Peterborough, New Hampshire, for an artist residency where she met Alec Waugh.

== Personal life ==
Sorensen had two children with her first husband: Frederick Sorensen Jr. and Elizabeth Hepburn. In 1958 she divorced Frederick, and in 1969 married author Alec Waugh at the Rock of Gibraltar. She later converted to Anglicanism at Waugh's request. Sorensen and Waugh lived primarily in Morocco but moved back to the states when Alec's health began to fail in 1980. After Alec died, she moved to North Carolina, where she died on December 24, 1991, at the age of 79. Her ashes were buried in the Provo Cemetery, next to her mother and sister.

== Themes ==
=== Adult novels ===
==== Mormonism and the "Returning Mormon" ====
Sorensen wrote several Mormon-themed books. Despite this, she said of herself, "As a writer and as a person, I can honestly say that I am not particularly interested in Mormons.”

Virginia Sorensen uses the motif of the "Returning Mormon", coined by biographer Stephen Carter, which describes the main characters returning to their small-town Mormon roots and coming to terms with their religion. This is shown in three of her novels: On This Star, The Evening and the Morning, and Many Heavens. In every novel, the main character tries to reintegrate in society after becoming more worldly, but because of Mormonism's closed culture, they find it difficult. In On This Star, Erik Eriksen fails entirely, and his story ends in death, showing that Sorensen believed it was impossible to reintegrate with Mormon society once one becomes involved with the outside world. In The Evening and the Morning, Kate Alexander returns to her hometown of Manti, Utah, after being shunned for pursuing an affair with a married man and giving birth to a daughter. Kate attempts to pursue this romance when she discovers his wife is dead, but finds that he is unwilling to love her in the same way, once again showing the protagonist failing to reintegrate into Mormon culture despite her hope that it was possible. In Many Heavens, Zina is hired to take care of Mette, the disabled wife of Niels Nielsen, but falls in love with him. He admits that he holds different types of love for both of them, and eventually Mette is the one to approach Zina about becoming a plural wife, despite this story occurring after the 1890 Manifesto. In all of these stories, Sorensen's progression of allowing the world and Mormonism to intermingle successfully is shown. Carter believes that this shows Sorensen's own progression of coming to terms with Mormonism. As Sorensen wrote The Proper Gods where the protagonist was able to fully integrate into a different culture, she was able to shift to allow Mormonism to prevail in Many Heavens, and break the cycle of the "Returning Mormon" and their inability to reintegrate in Mormon society and culture.

===== Blind faith versus doubt =====
Sorensen also emphasized the complexities of life, and her novels caution against thinking in absolutes, along with how religion closely tied to community can effect outsiders. In On This Star, Sorensen uses the Eriksen family and Erik to differentiate between the duty that comes with blind faith and true desire. The Eriksen family as a whole represents Mormonism because of their close alignment due to their shared heritage, beliefs, and goals. Because Erik no longer lives in the community and traveled across the country to pursue music, he is considered an outsider because he no longer aligns with those goals and beliefs. Despite this deviation, Linda Berlin believes that Erik is the only one to exhibit true Christ-like love because he did things with true desire rather than a sense of duty, like the rest of the Eriksen family did. Sorensen also contrasts blind faith and doubt in On This Star with the Chelnicia (Chel) Bowen and Erik Eriksen. Erik has traveled outside of Utah, and Chel has not, which is apparent in the way they deal with issues of religion. Chel is unfamiliar with temple ceremonies and why they are necessary—she just knows they are. Virginia Sorensen uses Chel's ignorance and naivete to critique the aspects of Mormonism that she did not agree with. LuDene Dallimore writes in "Mercy, Zina, and Kate: Virginia Sorensen's Strong Women in a Man's Society" about Many Heavens and how one of the themes present is "the certainty of religious faith with the complexities of doubt" and how the concept of "many heavens" and salvation is difficult to find in uncertainty. Sorensen also uses blind faith versus doubt to contrast Simon and Mercy Baker in A Little Lower than the Angels. Until Mercy's death, Simon and Mercy came into disagreement because of Simon's zealous and Mercy's lack of belief. Because of Mercy's opposition to blind faith, Dallimore says that she "[represents] a kind of spiritual life that is opposed to the spirit of religion". Kingdom Come is the only one of Sorensen's novels about Mormonism in which the characters do not go on a complex faith journey full of doubt.

==== Gender ====
Many scholars also consider Sorensen's novels to contain themes of feminism. The female protagonists in Sorensen's novels (specifically Mercy Baker, Zina Johnson, and Kate Alexander) are faced with discovering or coming to terms with their identities in male-dominated societies. Similarly, Grant T. Smith in his essay "Women Together: Kate Alexander's Search for Self in The Evening and the Morning" wrote that Kate's purpose as a woman ostracized from society allows her to act as a feminist heroic figure to create her own destiny based on love. Smith also discusses the importance of female communities and how that contributes to female self-sufficiency. He writes that "the ritual of community bonding is demonstrated in the process of repentance that Kate undertakes".

=== Children's novels ===
Unlike her adult novels, Sorensen does not use Mormonism as a backdrop for the majority of her children's novels. Rather, according to her biographer Stephen Carter, she focuses on clashing worldviews in the lens of what is called "lantern consciousness", a term coined by Alison Gopnik. Every novel follows a child who is exposed to a different lifestyle, whether that be determined by race, religion, etc. As the children learn more about the differing worldviews, they are caught in a middle ground, where adults in their lives want them to remain ignorant in other beliefs or lifestyles. To retain the realism, her children protagonists are always ordinary, rather than extraordinary. Because the use of lantern consciousness is more descriptive in nature than narrative, Sorensen uses adults with set worldviews to drive the narrative and conflict. Further, because of this lantern consciousness, Carter claims that Sorensen makes the claim that childhood does not need to die, which is shown typically through one adult who always retains a sense of this lantern consciousness and serves as a guiding light for the children as they learn more.

== Inspiration and style ==
=== Inspiration ===
As a regionalist author, Sorensen primarily drew inspiration from the places where she was living and often based her characters directly on people she knew or had met. Her first book for children, Curious Missy, grew out of her efforts helping her county in Alabama obtain a bookmobile, and her 1957 Newbery Medal-winning Miracles on Maple Hill was based in the Erie, Pennsylvania, region where she lived at that time. Virginia Sorensen was a part of Mormonism's "lost generation", a term coined by Edward Geary. These writers left either Utah or Mormonism in order to create critical portrayals of the state and religion. Despite this, these writers portrayed Mormons as characters other than villains that other popular publications portrayed them as. Mormonism thrived because of its isolation, but when Utah received statehood, this pattern of isolation changed. Sorensen lived during this change, and she wrote her novels as a way to deal with the unanswered questions of how the convergence of the world and Mormonism effected people at this time. Her collection of short stories, Where Nothing is Long Ago, was described by Eugene England as "essentially a collection of personal essays rather than short stories," but Sorenson reaffirmed that the collection is fictional. England considered these stories as an example of Sorensen's ability to combine personal experiences and emotional insights, which strengthened her skills as both an essayist and fiction writer. Sorensen was also heavily inspired by her grandmother, on whom she based Kate Alexander from The Morning and the Evening.

=== Style ===
Stephen Carter praised Sorensen for her use of "the poetic language, the emotional insight, the ethnographic eye, the gripping story", which is visible in all of her novels, but especially apparent in Many Heavens. Sorensen uses moral realism to explore complex themes and characters, which are the highlight of her writing. Her character work is praised by Stephen Carter and seen as one of the strengths of Sorensen's style. She writes complex and relatable characters who are trying to work through life. Sorensen also uses her themes as a backdrop to develop the plot and characters.

== Reception ==
Sorensen received praise for her first novel, A Little Lower than the Angels. Her publisher, Alfred Knopf, wrote in the book jacket, "I have seldom introduced a new novelist with the confidence I feel in the author of this remarkable book. It marks the debut, I believe, of a major American writer." The novel approached the history of Mormon polygamy with realism which was poorly received in Utah, despite the novel doing well elsewhere in America. "She sought to please her...Mormon contemporaries, yet was surprised to find her efforts tarred with suspicion", wrote her biographer, Mary L. Bradford.

Her next two novels did not receive the same acclaim. Critics criticized On This Star for its melodramatic ending, which took away from the rest of the novel. Edward Geary also criticized the melodramatic ending, but said that it was Sorensen's novel that "stays with [him] the most insistently". Linda Berlin criticized Sorensen for her portrayal of Mormonism as "narrow and flat" in On This Star. Kirkus Reviews believed that The Neighbors needed "drastic editing to control the wandering from the thread of narrative".

The Evening and the Morning received praise from many critics. Eugene England considered it her "finest novel". Stephen R. Carter has said "The Evening and the Morning is a perfect novel." In the University of Utah student newspaper, Virginia Sorensen was described as "a gifted novelist whose wise and sensitive books have grown out of first-hand observations of the American scene in a variety of regions".

Sorensen is most well-known for her children's novels. She won a Newbery Award for Miracles on Maple Hill. Because of Sorensen's use of lantern consciousness in her children's novels, observation is the focus of the novel. Stephen Carter says that "Virginia's focus on (and skill at producing) these transporting passages of lantern consciousness comes at the expense of her plots".

== Awards and honors ==
Sorensen received two Guggenheim fellowships, one in 1946 to study a tribe of Mexican Indians for her novel The Proper Gods, and one in 1954 to study the history of Sanpete Valley's settlers in Denmark. She was awarded the 1957 Newbery Medal and a Child Study Award for her children's novel, Miracles on Maple Hill. She also won a Child Study Award for her novel Plain Girl.

In 1989, Virginia Sorensen was inducted to Phi Beta Kappa at the University of Utah, where she was also given the distinction "Utah's First Lady of Letters". In 1991, she was granted an Honorary Lifetime Membership in the Association for Mormon Letters.

== Bibliography ==
For adults

- A Little Lower than the Angels – 1942, Knopf
- On this Star – 1946, Reynal & Hitchcock
- The Neighbors – 1947, Reynal & Hitchcock
- The Evening and The Morning – 1949, Harcourt, Brace and Co.
- The Proper Gods – 1952, Harcourt, Brace & Co.
- Many Heavens – 1954, Harcourt & Brace
- Kingdom Come – 1960, Harcourt & Brace
- Where Nothing is Long Ago – 1963, Harcourt & Brace
- The Man with the Key – 1974, Harcourt Brace & Co. Jovanovich

For children

- Curious Missie – 1953, Harcourt Brace
- The House Next Door: Utah 1896; 1954, Scribners
- Plain Girl – 1955, Harcourt Brace, won the Child Study Award
- Miracles on Maple Hill – 1957, Harcourt Brace, won the Child Study Award and the 1957 John Newbery Medal
- Lotte's Locket – 1964, Harcourt Brace
- Around the Corner – 1973, Harcourt Brace
- Friends of the Road – 1978, Atheneum

== See also ==
- Simon P. Eggertsen Sr. House (home of grandfather)
- Mormon fiction

== Works cited ==
- Bradford, Mary (2009-10-30). "12 Virginia Eggertsen Sorensen Waugh (1912-1991): Utah's First Lady of Letters". In Whitley, Colleen (ed.). Worth Their Salt Too. Utah State University Press. doi:10.2307/j.ctt4cgpjz. ISBN 978-0-87421-766-7. JSTOR j.ctt4cgpjz.
- Carter, Stephen (2023). Virginia Sorensen Pioneering Mormon Author (1st ed.). Salt Lake City: Signature Books. ISBN 9781560854586.
- England, Eugene (1994). "Virginia Sorensen as the Founding Foremother of the Mormon Personal Essay". The Association for Mormon Letters Annual. Association for Mormon Letters.
- Berlin, Linda (1994). "The Strength and Weaknesses of Virginia Sorensen's On This Star". The Association for Mormon Letters Annual. Association for Mormon Letters.
- Dallimore, LuDene (1994). "Mercy, Zina, and Kate: Virginia Sorensen's Strong Women in a Man's Society". The Association for Mormon Letters Annual. Association for Mormon Letters.
- Smith, Grant T. (1994). "Women Together: Kate Alexander's Search for Self in The Evening and the Morning". The Association for Mormon Letters Annual. Association for Mormon Letters.
- Geary, Edward (1994). "Joseph and His Brothers: Rivalry in Virginia Sorensen's On This Star". The Association for Mormon Letters Annual. Association for Mormon Letters.
- Moos, Dan (2005). Outside America: Race, Ethnicity, and the role of the American West in National Belonging. Dartmouth College Press.
