= Verité Reily Collins =

British businesswoman and campaigner

- Born: Verité Valda Reily Collins; 3 August 1938; Exeter, England
- Died: 2 July 2025 (aged 86); Dorchester-on-Thames
- Citizenship: British
- Occupations: Businesswoman and campaigner
- Spouse(s): Tony George; Peter Baker

Verité Reily Collins (3 August 1938 – 2 July 2025) was a British businesswoman, writer and health campaigner. Her company launched the "Union Jills", a team of female demonstrators and sales staff who promoted British goods internationally. She became notable through a bizarre tribute to her work by the feminist writer Germaine Greer. In her book The Female Eunuch, Greer saluted the efforts of Reily Collins as an example of a successful female entrepreneur, at a time when this was considered to be unusual. Later in life Reily Collins became a health campaigner for the two conditions that impacted her, polio and cancer. She was a trustee of the Polio Survivors Network, a registered charity which supports those with post polio syndrome (PPS). As a writer, she promoted the Border Terrier dog breed and the tourism industry.

== Early years ==
Verité Valda Reily Collins was born 3 August 1938 in Exeter, to Commander Edward Reily Collins, of the Royal Navy, and Valda Dorothy, née Longstaffe Forster. She had two brothers. In the early 1950s, Her father was deployed to Turkey to support the country's admission into NATO and Verité Reily Collins spent part of her childhood there. She attended the English High School for Girls in Istanbul, now known as the Beyoğlu Anatolian High School. While living in Istanbul in 1953 she contracted polio when she was 15 years old. She was airlifted back to Royal National Orthopaedic Hospital in London, put in an iron lung and it was suggested she would never walk again. After two years of hospital treatment she was able to recover much of her mobility.

== Union Jills and feminism ==
The Union Jills took their name from word play of the Union Jack, the flag of the United Kingdom. There were team of some twenty women who would travel to international trade shows, to demonstrate and sell British goods. Their uniform was a patriotic splash of red, white and blue, with Union Jack rings and earrings. Their activities later became part as part of the 1968 I'm Backing Britain campaign. The Jills were originally started in collaboration with the British National Export Council, an organisation headed by Sir Alexander Glenn and launched in 1964. A Pathe News black and white newsreel exists of one such sortie, showing Reily Collins and five other Jills at Heathrow Airport, heading off to the Geneva Motor Show in March 1967.

While the Union Jills' contribution to female emancipation is perhaps open to question, Germaine Greer had fewer qualms. In The Female Eunuch she hailed Reily Collins' enterprise in the section of her book describing those women who had been successful in business: "Verité Collins invented her own firm of demonstrators and saleswomen for British goods overseas, the Union Jills, and became a director of the agencies and firms that organize such trade exhibitions." Reily Collins was managing director of Dundas International, a conference facilitation company, and several other companies, promoting tourism. She was particularly keen to promote language learning in the UK, noting the poor availability, particularly for female translators - she spoke five languages. She was a member of several tourism bodies and in 2002 one of the directors of the Tourism Society.

== Life as a writer ==
Reily Collins wrote 17 books and many newspaper articles about tourism, dogs, the voluntary sector and healthcare. On her death she was described as a "stalwart" member of the Freelance division of the Chartered Institute of Journalists. She occasionally wrote about her limited mobility issues, but perhaps with some reluctance, she certainly didn't want to be defined by disabilities. Her book on Border Terriers reflects her lifelong interest in the breed, an interest that she inherited from her father. She campaigned for easier rules on quarantine for search and rescue dogs returning from overseas emergencies.

== Health campaigner ==
In later years Reily Collins became active as a health campaigner for both polio and cancer survivors. The highly successful polio vaccine developed by Jonas Salk came out in 1955, nearly eliminating new cases, but this still left many thousand of patients who had contracted polio before the vaccine's rollout. In many cases the initial available treatments were successful to some degree, but many people have subsequently ended up suffering from post polio syndrome. PPS can strike perhaps decades after recovery from the initial childhood paralysis from poliomyelitis, causing a new round of muscular atrophy and limb fatigue, among other symptoms, in later life. PPS is not well understood and those with PPS often struggle to get access to appropriate treatment pathways. Reily Collins had personal experiences of this, having originally contracted polio in 1953, and did her best to highlight areas for improvement. Reily Collins became a trustee of the Polio Survivors Network, a UK charity dedicated to improving patients' outcomes.

Later, when given a cancer diagnosis, she started her After Cancer website which sought a different approach and improved NHS treatment for those living with cancer. Deliberately avoiding self pity, her website was a mix of supportive practical advice, campaigning news and personal experiences. She could be sharply critical of the NHS. In 2009 she wrote a letter to The Guardian, which received some attention: "As a patient, what I need is practical advice about how to get quicker appointments, what I can copy from better treatment offered in other countries, and someone to campaign for better UK cancer treatment; it is currently the worst in Europe."

== Personal life ==
Reily Collins was married and divorced twice. For much of her life she lived in Chelsea, London, by Brompton Cemetery. She was often seen navigating around the neighbourhood in her tricycle, specially adapted with a carrier for her Border Terrier dogs, who sometimes made appearances at Crufts. In later years she moved to Dorchester-on-Thames, Oxfordshire. Her final After Cancer blog article was dated 31 May 2025. She died on 2 July 2025.

== Selected bibliography ==
- About the Border Terrier. Waterlooville: Kingdom Books, 1997. ISBN 978-1-85279-022-6
- Careers and Jobs In Travel and Tourism. London: Kogan Page, 2004. ISBN 978-0-7494-4205-7
- Working in Tourism: The UK, Europe & beyond. Oxford: Vacation Work, 1999, second edition 2002. ISBN 978-1-85458-218-8
