= Telford Waugh =

British diplomat (1865–1950)

Sir Telford Waugh KCMG
- Sir Telford Waugh by Bassano Ltd
- Born: 22 October 1865; London
- Died: 7 January 1950 (aged 84); London
- Education: St. John's School, Leatherhead
- Relatives: Gt. Grandfather: Rev. Alexander Waugh D.D. First cousin: Arthur Waugh; Nephews: Evelyn Waugh; Alec Waugh

Sir (Alexander) Telford Waugh KCMG (22 October 1865 – 7 January 1950) was a British diplomat who experienced at first hand the final days of the Ottoman Empire.

== Life ==
Alexander Telford Waugh was born in London on 22 October 1865 and educated at St John's School, Leatherhead, Forest School and in Germany. In 1885, Waugh joined the Levant Consular Service as a student interpreter. He saw service in Albania, where Turkish authority was on the wane, and in Turkish Kurdistan soon after the Hamidian massacres.

Waugh was appointed vice-consul at Constantinople in March 1900. When Turkey joined the Central Powers, Waugh remained in Turkey at the American Embassy to protect British interests, the British representatives having left the country. In 1915 he was recalled to the Foreign Office in London before being sent to Athens as Britain’s commercial attaché where he was put in charge of the Contraband Department to control Greek trade during World War I. After the armistice, he was sent back to Constantinople where his experience and contacts made him a useful member of staff at the British High Commission to implement the terms of the armistice. He was later appointed Consul-General in Constantinople. Waugh was appointed CMG in 1919 and KCMG on retirement.

Waugh was the great-grandson of the Rev. Alexander Waugh D.D. (1754–1827) and the first cousin of Arthur Waugh and the uncle of Evelyn Waugh. Commenting on the title of Sir Telford's book, Turkey: Yesterday, Today, and Tomorrow, Arthur Waugh remarked that it "should have been called Boxing Day." Evelyn Waugh claimed it was his father's only memorable joke.

In 1925 Sir Telford Waugh married Gwendda Kate, daughter of the late A.C. Hugh-Jones. He died in London on 7 January 1950.

== Publication ==
- Turkey: Yesterday, Today, and Tomorrow by Sir Telford Waugh. Published by Chapman and Hall, London, 1930
