= Rıza Türmen =

Turkish politician

Rıza Mahmut Türmen
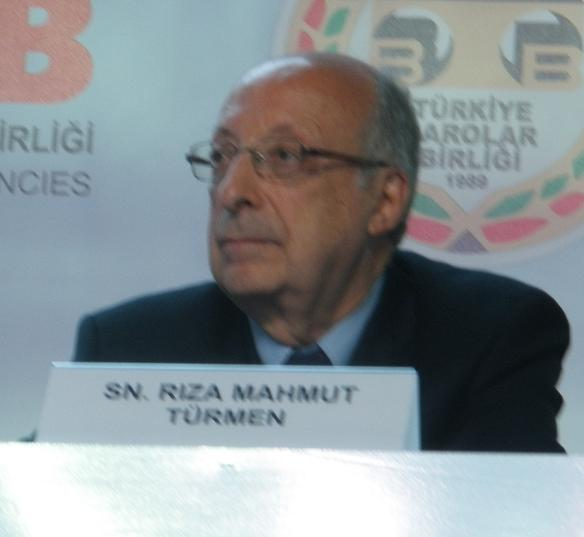
- Born: 17 June 1941 (age 84); Istanbul, Turkey
- Education: English High School for Boys
- Alma mater: Istanbul University (LLB); McGill University (LLM); Ankara University (PhD)
- Occupations: Judge, diplomat, politician
- Political party: Republican People's Party (CHP)

Rıza Mahmut Türmen (born 17 June 1941) is a Turkish politician and judge. He is the former judge of the European Court of Human Rights and currently an MP for İzmir in the Turkish Parliament, with the Republican People's Party.

He graduated from Istanbul University law faculty in 1964. He took a master's degree in at McGill University, Montreal, before doing his doctorate at Faculty of Political Science, Ankara University.

Türmen has held various positions at the Turkish Ministry of Foreign Affairs, which he joined in 1966. In 1978, he was appointed Turkey's representative to the International Civil Aviation Organization. He was ambassador to Singapore in 1985. From 1989 to 1994 he worked in Ankara as the Director General responsible for the Council of Europe, United Nations, Organization for Security and Co-operation in Europe and human rights. From 1995 to 1996 he was ambassador to Switzerland at Bern. Between 1996 and 1997, Türmen was the Permanent Representative of Turkey to the Council of Europe. From 1998 to 2008, he was the Turkish judge for the European Court of Human Rights.

During the 2014 Turkish presidential election process, the Peoples' Democratic Party (HDP) offered Türmen their nomination for the presidency. Türmen declined the offer, stating that while he was honored by the gesture, he would continue his political struggle within the Republican People's Party (CHP).

Since his retirement he has written a column for the Turkish newspaper Milliyet. Rıza Türmen is also known as a campaigner for the independence of the judiciary in Turkey.

He is married to Dr Tomris Türmen. The couple has one daughter.

== Awards ==
- Turkish Bar Association Lawyer of the Year, 2009
- Middle East Technical University Distinguished Service Award, 2009
- Turkish Journalists Association Freedom of the Press Award, 2009

== Articles and publications ==
- "Contemporary issues in human rights", Perceptions, Journal of International Affairs, 1997
- "On multiculturalism", Perceptions, Journal of International Affairs, 1998-1999
