= Post tenebras lux =

Latin phrase

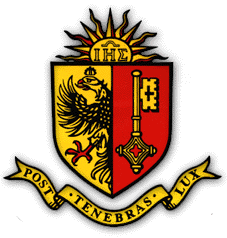
Coat of arms of Geneva

Post tenebras lux is a Latin phrase translated as Light After Darkness. It appears as Post tenebras spero lucem ("After darkness, I hope for light") in the Vulgate version of Job 17:12.

Post Tenebras Lux in the seal of the Canton of Geneva

The phrase came to be adopted as the Calvinist motto, and was subsequently adopted as the motto of the entire Protestant Reformation. It is used by John Calvin's adopted city of Geneva, Switzerland on their coins. As a mark of its role in the Calvinist movement, the motto is engraved on the Reformation Wall, in Geneva, and the Huguenot Monument, in Franschhoek, South Africa.

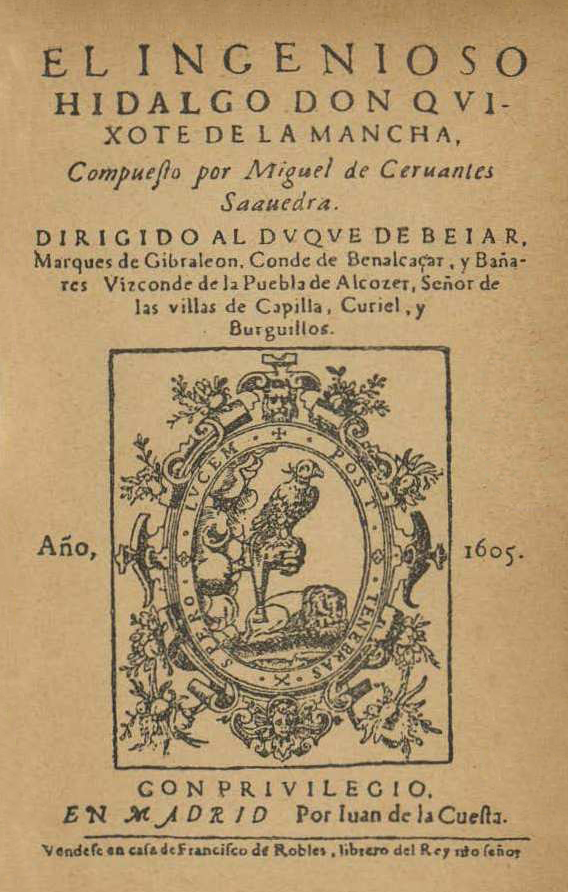
Title page of first edition of Part I of Don Quixote (1605), featuring the motto Post tenebras spero lucem on the strapwork around the central device

In the form Post tenebras spero lucem, the motto appears in Part II of Cervantes' Don Quixote, and features on the title pages of the first editions of both Parts I and II, published by Juan de la Cuesta in 1605 and 1615 respectively.

Post tenebras lux was formerly the state motto of Chile, before being replaced by the Spanish Por la razón o la fuerza (By reason or by force).

It is/was the motto of:

- American International College (Springfield, Massachusetts)
- Beyoğlu Anadolu Lisesi, an English high school for girls (Istanbul, Turkey)
- Certain of Sir Rowland Hill's (publisher of the Geneva Bible) publishing activities and appears on the second quarto of A Midsummer Night's Dream
- Europa Ventures, in the movie Europa Report
- Geneva Academy, K–12 school (Monroe, Louisiana)
- Reformation Bible College (Sanford, Florida)
- Robert College, an American school in Istanbul, Turkey; one of two school mottos
- Smith Preparatory Academy, a K-12 classical Christian school (Altamonte Springs, Florida)
- The Geneva School, a classical Christian school (Winter Park, Florida)
- United States Merchant Marine Academy Class of 2024 (Kings Point, New York)
- University Externado of Colombia (Bogotá, Colombia)
- University of Geneva
- Wolverhampton, translated as Out of darkness cometh light; also E tenebris oritur lux (on the seal of the Mayor, Aldermen and Burgesses of the Borough of Wolverhampton).
