= William Waugh =

William Waugh may refer to:

- Bill Waugh (born 1973), British field hockey player
- Billy Waugh (1929–2023), retired American Special Forces Sergeant Major and Central Intelligence Agency Paramilitary Operations Officer
- William Waugh (football manager) (died 1921), Heart of Midlothian F.C. manager from 1903 to 1908
- Willie Waugh (1910–1970), Scottish football player
- Billy Waugh (footballer) (1921–2009), former Scottish footballer
