= List of Heart of Midlothian F.C. managers =

Heart of Midlothian F.C., commonly known as Hearts, is a professional football club based in Edinburgh, Scotland. Formed in 1874, the club has employed a manager to run the team since 1901, the first being Peter Fairley. Wouter Vrancken is the club's current head coach, having been appointed on 25 June 2026.

== List of managers ==
Information correct as of 19 September 2026. Only competitive matches are counted

Name	Nationality	From	To	P	W	D	L	Win% (Note: Win% is rounded to two decimal places)	Honours	Notes
Peter Fairley	Scotland	1 August 1901	31 July 1903	53	27	13	13	50		
William Waugh	Scotland	1 August 1903	1 April 1908	164	79	35	50	48		
James McGhee	Scotland	11 April 1908	7 December 1909	55	20	12	23	36		
John McCartney	Scotland	19 January 1910	18 October 1919	365	172	70	123	47		
Willie McCartney	Scotland	19 October 1919	1 July 1935	674	288	164	222	42		
David Pratt	Scotland	2 July 1935	5 February 1937	68	40	10	18	58		
Frank Moss	England	15 March 1937	31 July 1941	161	89	24	48	55		
David McLean	Scotland	1 August 1941	14 February 1951	372	175	73	124	47		
Tommy Walker	Scotland	18 February 1951	28 September 1966	695	383	143	169	55		
John Harvey	Scotland	29 September 1966	30 November 1970	188	73	40	75	38		
Bobby Seith	Scotland	1 December 1970	11 October 1974	185	69	51	65	37		
John Hagart	Scotland	12 October 1974	23 April 1977	139	50	41	48	35		
Willie Ormond	Scotland	5 May 1977	8 January 1980	117	50	28	39	42		
Alex Rennie	Scotland	9 January 1980	15 February 1980	4	2	2	0	50		Caretaker
Bobby Moncur	Scotland	16 February 1980	10 June 1981	60	17	12	31	28.33		
Tony Ford	England	30 June 1981	9 December 1981	24	9	8	7	37		
Alex MacDonald	Scotland	10 December 1981	30 October 1986	232	111	55	66	47		
Alex MacDonald & Sandy Jardine	Scotland	1 November 1986	30 November 1988	113	54	36	23	47		Joint managers
Alex MacDonald	Scotland	1 December 1988	9 September 1990	73	32	19	22	43		
Joe Jordan	Scotland	10 September 1990	3 May 1993	143	69	31	43	48		
Sandy Clark	Scotland	10 May 1993	20 June 1994	30	10	9	11	33.33		
Tommy McLean	Scotland	1 July 1994	31 May 1995	43	16	8	19	37.21		
Jim Jefferies	Scotland	1 August 1995	8 November 2000	242	108	57	77	44.46	Scottish Cup Winners 1998	
Peter Houston	Scotland	8 November 2000	1 December 2000	4	2	2	0	50		Caretaker
Craig Levein	Scotland	1 December 2000	29 October 2004	170	74	41	55	43.53		
Peter Houston	Scotland	29 October 2004	1 November 2004	1	1	0	0	100		Caretaker
John Robertson	Scotland	3 November 2004	9 May 2005	35	13	9	13	37.14		
Steven Pressley & John McGlynn	Scotland	11 May 2005	29 June 2005	2	0	0	2	0		Caretaker joint managers
George Burley	Scotland	30 June 2005	21 October 2005	12	9	1	2	75.00		
John McGlynn	Scotland	21 October 2005	8 November 2005	4	3	0	1	75.00		Caretaker
Graham Rix	England	8 November 2005	22 March 2006	19	9	6	4	47.37		
Valdas Ivanauskas	Lithuania	22 March 2006	23 October 2006	28	14	5	9	50.00	Scottish Cup Winners 2006	
Eduard Malofeyev	Russia	23 October 2006	14 November 2006	4	0	2	2	0		Caretaker
Eugenijus Riabovas	Lithuania	14 November 2006	1 December 2006	2	0	1	1	0		
Valdas Ivanauskas	Lithuania	1 December 2006	2 March 2007	14	7	3	4	50.00		
Anatoly Korobochka	Russia	2 March 2007	1 January 2008	33	13	14	6	39.40		Caretaker
Stephen Frail	Scotland	1 January 2008	9 July 2008	21	8	5	8	38.10		
Csaba László	Romania	11 July 2008	29 January 2010	58	23	20	15	39.66		
Jim Jefferies	Scotland	29 January 2010	1 August 2011	58	25	22	11	43.10		
Paulo Sérgio Bento Brito	Portugal	2 August 2011	7 June 2012	47	20	11	16	42.55	Scottish Cup Winners 2012	
John McGlynn	Scotland	26 June 2012	28 February 2013	34	10	10	14	29.41		
Gary Locke	Scotland	28 February 2013	12 May 2014	54	17	10	27	31.48		
Robbie Neilson	Scotland	12 May 2014	1 December 2016	106	62	22	22	58.49		Head coach
Ian Cathro	Scotland	5 December 2016	1 August 2017	30	7	9	14	23.33		Head coach
Craig Levein	Scotland	28 August 2017	31 October 2019	106	42	28	36	39.62		Head coach
Daniel Stendel	Germany	7 December 2019	21 June 2020	17	5	5	7	29.41		
Robbie Neilson	Scotland	21 June 2020	9 April 2023	126	63	23	40	50.00		
Steven Naismith	Scotland	11 April 2023	6 June 2023	7	2	3	2	28.57		Interim coach
Frankie McAvoy	Scotland	7 June 2023	3 September 2023	9	3	1	5	33.33		Head coach
Steven Naismith	Scotland	3 September 2023	22 September 2024	65	28	12	25	43.10		Head coach
Liam Fox	Scotland	23 September 2024	15 October 2024	3	1	1	1	33.33		Interim coach
Neil Critchley	England	15 October 2024	26 April 2025	25	7	5	13	28.00		Head coach
Liam Fox	Scotland	26 April 2025	18 May 2025	4	4	0	0	100.00		Interim coach
Derek McInnes	Scotland	19 May 2025	16 June 2026	44	28	10	6	63.64		
Wouter Vrancken	Belgium	25 June 2026	present	15	6	4	5	40.00		Head coach
