= Beyoğlu Anatolian High School =

High school in Turkey

Coordinates: 41.0319°N 28.9762°E

- Beyoğlu Anadolu Lisesi
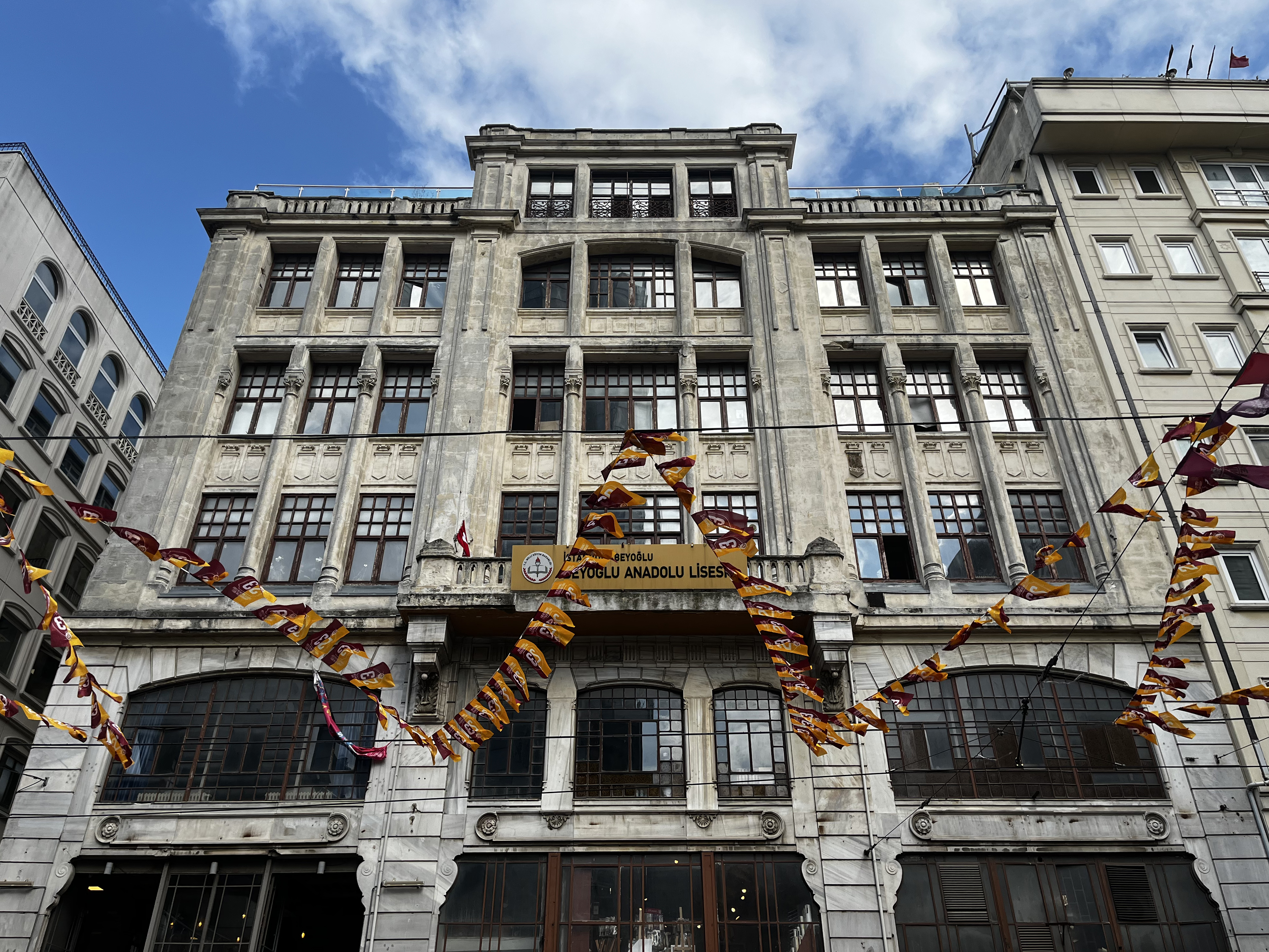
- The façade of the school building.

Location
- İstiklal Caddesi Nur-u Ziya Sokak No: 2 Beyoğlu, Istanbul

Information
- Former name: English High School for Girls (1849–1980)
- Type: Public
- Motto: Post Tenebras Lux (Latin) (Light After Darkness)
- Established: 1849; 177 years ago
- Founder: Lady Stratford Redcliffe
- CEEB code: 696225
- Headmaster: Gülay Hacısalihoğlu
- Grades: Prep, 9–12
- Gender: Co-educational
- Enrollment: 258
- Campus type: Urban
- Student Union/Association: English High School'lular Derneği
- Color: Blue White
- Accreditation: Advanced Placement (AP)
- Website: beyogluanadolu.meb.k12.tr/

Beyoğlu Anatolian High School (Turkish: Beyoğlu Anadolu Lisesi), initially founded as the English High School for Girls (EHSG) in 1849, stands as one of Turkey’s oldest educational institutions. The school is noted for its rigorous academic standards and selective admissions process.

== History ==
From 1842 to 1858, during Stratford Canning, 1st Viscount Stratford de Redcliffe's tenure as the British ambassador in Istanbul, Lady Redcliffe founded a middle school for girls associated with the embassy personnel in 1849. This initiative received favorable attention from Sultan Abdülmecid. The school, however, had to close for six years during the Crimean War, and the site and building were donated to the British Embassy by Lady Redcliffe. After the war, a board composed of members from the British consulate in Istanbul managed the school, which temporarily closed again during the Russo-Turkish War but reopened in 1881. This time, the school also began admitting Ottoman subjects residing in the Beyoğlu.

The building, being old and insufficient, prompted the school administration to start a fundraising campaign among wealthy parents, leading to the construction of the current building in 1901, a rare example of Pera architecture still in use today. The school continued its education until the outbreak of World War I in 1914 and was shut down three times until 1920.

On 24 October 1971, Queen Elizabeth II, Prince Philip, Duke of Edinburgh and Princess Anne visited the school.

With the Republic's enactment of the "Education Unity" Law in 1943, the curriculum was reorganized according to the new legal standards. Originally named "English High School," the school was nationalized on 1 November 1979, renamed İngiliz Kız Ortaokulu (lit. 'English Girls' Middle School'), and when the high school section was opened in 1980, it was renamed Beyoğlu Anatolian High School.

== Extracurricular activities ==
- Values Club
- Literature, Librarianship, Publishing, and Poetry Club
- eTwinning Club
- Gastronomy Club
- Travel, Promotion, Environmental Protection Club
- Entrepreneurship Club
- Visual Arts Club
- Animal Love and Protection Club
- English Debate and Theater Club
- Istanbul Beyoğlu Club
- Red Crescent, Green Crescent, Social Assistance Club
- Mathematics, Brain Games, and Chess Club
- Music Club
- Robotics Coding, Science Olympiads, Erasmus Project Club
- Sports, Folk Dances and Latin Dance Club
- Publishing and Journalism Club
- Model United Nations Club
- Cinema Club
- Civil Defense, Occupational Health and Safety Club
- History Club
- TEDx Club
- UNESCO Club

== Notable alumnae ==
- Vuslat Doğan Sabancı – Turkish businesswoman
- Ümit Boyner – Turkish businesswoman
- Gülse Birsel – Turkish screenwriter and actress
- Zeynep Fadıllıoğlu – Turkish interior designer
- Tomris Uyar – Turkish writer and translator

== See also ==
- British International School Istanbul
- Nişantaşı Anatolian High School
- Tarabya British Schools
