= Ed Waugh and Trevor Wood =

British playwrights

- Occupation: Playwrights/scriptwriters
- Writing career
- Period: 2002 - present
- Notable awards: Winners: 2010 "Best Comedy" screenplay at the New York-based Gotham Screen International Film Festival
- Website: www.edwaughandtrevorwood.co.uk

Ed Waugh and Trevor Wood are British playwrights. To date, they have had eight plays professionally produced in the UK, Ireland, New Zealand and Australia. Their radio play "Son of Samurai" was performed at the 2009 Latitude Festival alongside the RSC and Bush Theatre Company.

Ed Waugh (born 18 January 1959) and Trevor Wood (born 17 September 1958) writing together in January 2002 and have premiered their plays at the Customs House in South Shields and the Gala theatre in Durham. Waugh is from Newcastle Upon Tyne and Wood is from Bristol. They are based in the North East of England.

== Career ==
Their first play Good to Firm (2002) started a string of commercial hits that brought them to the attention of independent producers across the UK.

Their biggest hit to date Dirty Dusting (2003) is a comedy about three elderly cleaning ladies who set up a telephone sex line. After its premiere at the Customs House it transferred to the 1200-seat Newcastle Theatre Royal for two sell-out runs before moving to The King's Theatre, Glasgow, in 2005 where it played two runs. In spring 2006, the show, starring Adele “Twink” King, played four weeks at the Gaiety Theatre in Dublin as part of an Irish tour. It has subsequently played throughout the UK, Ireland, New Zealand and toured Australia in 2009 and 2010. It returned to New Zealand for a major tour in 2011.

Their other touring success Waiting For Gateaux premiered at the Customs House in April 2005. It then premiered in New Zealand at The Fortune Theatre, Dunedin, in June 2006, where it played for three weeks before embarking on a week’s tour of the South Island. An eight-week tour of the UK in the summer of 2010 (directed and produced by Bruce James) starred former Emmerdale actress Lisa Riley.

The Revengers (2006) and Maggie's End (2007) marked a big departure from their previous comedy work and caused some controversy locally and nationally. Still comedic in tone, The Revengers features a loan shark while Maggie’s End begins with the death of Margaret Thatcher and explores the repercussions on one family of the New Labour government giving her a state funeral.

Maggie’s End transferred to the Shaw Theatre, London, in April 2009 where it was sponsored by the North East Area National Union of Mineworkers (NUM), the RMT, UNITE and the GMB as the focal point of the 25th anniversary of the UK Miners Strike.

The London Evening Standard said: "[Maggie’s End] brims appealingly with undeniable passion….in this instance, Vote Thatcher"; and The Spectator said: "Crammed with excellent jokes, Maggie’s End has the tang of real emotion, real anger and attitude - its stirring blasts of rage and mockery are bound to be heard elsewhere soon."

Such has been the impact of the play, the writers have become the "go-to" people for national and international media wanting an interview about Margaret Thatcher. On the release of The Iron Lady in February 2012, BBC Radio 5 Live and the Swiss cultural television show Kultureplatz asked for a response.

Both The Revengers and Maggie’s End were performed at The Pomegranate Theatre, Chesterfield, in 2009 and 2010 respectively. The Tribune magazine reviewer said of The Revengers: "Ed Waugh and Trevor Wood have crafted an extraordinary dramatic comedy - sometimes light in touch, sometimes dark in depth but wholly entertaining on a number of levels. It is a shining example of great theatre and should not be missed."

In 2009 the duo premiered Alf Ramsey Knew My Grandfather at the Gala theatre, Durham. It is the story of the County Durham miners from West Auckland FC who won the first world cup in Turin in 1909 and is regarded as the greatest football story ever, as told on BBC Radio 4’s flagship show The Today Programme. The play features a "to camera" cameo appearance by Soccer Saturday host Jeff Stelling.

The "West" lads returned to Turin in 1911 where they beat the mighty Juventus FC 6-1 to retain the stunning Sir Thomas Lipton Trophy in perpetuity. This heart-warming story of the underdogs was also the subject of a film called A Captain’s Tale in 1984, which starred Dennis Waterman.

Alf Ramsey Knew My Grandfather transferred to Newcastle’s Theatre Royal in May 2010 (directed by Andrew Lynford). The Sir Thomas Lipton Trophy and the play were featured on Sky’s Soccer AM as part of the publicity. The play will also be performed at the 900-seat Darlington Civic Theatre (directed by Mark Wingett) in July 2012 and all profits will go to the aid of Darlington FC 1883.

In the autumn of 2010, their trilogy of "horseracing plays" - featuring the central characters of Bob Fletcher and his put upon wife Shirley - played the Customs House. Good To Firm and Raising The Stakes (both directed by Mark Wingett) were reprised while the trilogy was completed by the world premiere of Photo Finish (directed by Jack Milner).

In May 2011 The Revengers received a third production, at Barons Court Theatre, London. Directed and starring Simon Nader for Orange Grille Productions, the show was described by Extra! Extra! as "an entertaining, dramatic production with some genuine chemistry and comic moments".

Their radio sitcom pilot It's Grim Up North went live on the duo's website in August 2011. Situated on Hadrian's Wall in 126AD, It's Grim Up North is about the Roman auxiliaries who built the wall and their exploits creating a black market for Roman goods among the Picts and Britons. Subsequently, BBC Radio Cumbria commissioned 5 x 6-minute episodes, which were broadcast by the station in February 2012. They have subsequently written a second, 30-minute, episode which will be featured in a theatre tour. A beer called Drizzlewort, has been brewed by the Brampton-based Geltsdale Brewerey in Cumbria to celebrate the show.

In February 2012 they wrote two sketches for Sunday for Sammy, which were performed to sell-out audiences at Theatre Royal, Newcastle.

Their latest stage play is called Amazing Grace, about Grace Darling who in 1838, with her lighthouse keeper father William, rescued 9 survivors from the wreck of the SS Forfarshire off the coast of Bamburgh in Northumberland. Billed as "When Hollywood came to Northumberland it was bound to cause a storm", this is a contemporary, funny and heartfelt story about the making of the biopic of the very first Victorian heroine. After a world premiere at Alnwick Playhouse (co-producers) on 17 October, the production is touring to ten venues throughout the north east of England and a collection will be held for the RNLI after each of the 23 shows.

In addition to playwriting, they have worked with BBC comedy and Ipso Facto Films on sitcom and film scripts. In November 2010 Ed Waugh & Trevor Wood won the 2010 "Best Comedy" screenplay award for The Liquidator at the New York-based Gotham Screen International Film Festival

== Works ==
=== Stage Plays and Theatre Productions ===
- Good To Firm - World premiere Customs House, South Shields (June 2002); Customs House re-run (September 2010)
- Dirty Dusting - World premiere Customs House, South Shields (February 2003); UK, Scottish, Irish, New Zealand and Australian tours since. The play has recently been released to the amateur market and is proving very popular.
- Raising The Stakes – World premiere Customs House, South Shields (March 2003); Customs House re-run (October 2010)
- Waiting For Gateaux – World Premiere, Customs House (April 2005); New Zealand premiere and tour (June 2006); UK tour June/July 2010
- The Revengers – World Premiere Customs House (September 2005); Pomegranate Theatre, Chesterfield (June 2009); Barons Court Theatre, London (May 2011)
- Son of Samurai – World premiere Customs House, South Shields (August 2007); Latitude Festival (July 2008) followed by a North East UK tour
- Maggie’s End – World premiere Gala theatre, Durham (October 2007); Shaw Theatre, London (April 2009); Pomegranate Theatre (March 2010)
- Alf Ramsey Knew My Grandfather – World premiere Gala Theatre, Durham (April 2009); Newcastle Theatre Royal (May 2010); Darlington Civic Theatre (July 2012)
- Photo Finish – World premiere Customs House, South Shields (October 2010)

=== Forthcoming ===
- God Only Knows - A stage play about the teaching of creationism in biology classes in state schools
- Cinderella 2 – A children’s play about Buttons rescuing Cinderella from the clutches of a cruel prince
- Amazing Grace – A contemporary stage play about Grace Darling, the 19th century sea rescue heroine from Bamburgh, Northumberland.
