= James Waugh =

James Waugh may refer to:

- James Waugh (racehorse trainer) (1831–1905), Scottish racehorse trainer
- James Waugh (politician) (born 1957), South African politician
- James Swanton Waugh (1822–1898) Irish clergyman in Australia
- Jim Waugh (1933–2010), American baseball pitcher
- Jimmy Waugh (1898–1968), English footballer

== See also ==
- Alexander P. and James S. Waugh House, a historic home in Greenville, Mercer County, Pennsylvania, United States
