= John Waugh =

John Waugh may refer to:

- John S. Waugh (1929–2014), American chemist
- John Waugh (footballer, born 1892) (1892–?), Scottish footballer for Gillingham
- John Waugh (footballer, born 1889) (1889–?), Scottish footballer for Hamilton Academical and Motherwell
- John C. Waugh (born 1929), also known as Jack Waugh, American journalist and historian
- John Waugh (bishop) (1656–1734), English churchman, bishop of Carlisle from 1723
- John Waugh (priest) (died 1765)
- John Waugh, saxophonist with The 1975
