= Lower than the angels =

Phrase from Epistle to the Hebrews Chapter 2

"A little lower than the angels" is a phrase from Epistle to the Hebrews Chapter 2 and Psalm 8:5. It is a frequent locus of Christological controversy throughout the history of Christianity and theology.

== Source passages ==
The original phrase is drawn from Psalm 8:5, however the author of Hebrews follows the Greek of the Septuagint with the reading "lower than the angels" (Hebrews 2:7) instead of the Hebrew "lower than God" (Elohim). The original Hebrew text is usually construed as "you made him [man] lower than God", while the Septuagint has the meaning "you made him [man] lower than the angels".

Psalms 8:4-6 in Hebrew (Note: In the Jewish verse numbering, the ascription of this psalm is verse 1, and the rest of the psalm begins from verse 2. However, the Christian verse numbering does not count the ascription as a separate verse.)	English translation of Psalms 8:4-6 from Hebrew	Psalms 8:4-6 in Septuagint Greek	English translation of Psalms 8:4-6 from Greek	Hebrews 2:6-8
4 מָה־אֱנ֥וֹשׁ כִּֽי־תִזְכְּרֶ֑נּוּ וּבֶן־אָ֝דָ֗ם כִּ֣י תִפְקְדֶֽנּוּ׃	4 What are human beings that you are mindful of them, mortals that you care for them?	4 τί ἐστιν ἄνθρωπος, ὅτι μιμνῄσκῃ αὐτοῦ; ἢ υἱὸς ἀνθρώπου, ὅτι ἐπισκέπτῃ αὐτόν;	4 What is man that you are mindful of him or son of man that you attend to him?	6 What are human beings that you are mindful of them, or mortals, that you care for them?
5 וַתְּחַסְּרֵ֣הוּ מְּ֭עַט מֵאֱלֹהִ֑ים וְכָב֖וֹד וְהָדָ֣ר תְּעַטְּרֵֽהוּ׃	5 Yet you have made them a little lower than God, (Note: Literally, "Elohim.") and crowned them with glory and honor.	5 ἠλάττωσας αὐτὸν βραχύ τι παρ᾿ ἀγγέλους, δόξῃ καὶ τιμῇ ἐστεφάνωσας αὐτόν,	5 You diminished him a little in comparison with angels; with glory and honor you crowned him.	7 You have made them for a little while lower than the angels; you have crowned them with glory and honor,
6 תַּ֭מְשִׁילֵהוּ בְּמַעֲשֵׂ֣י יָדֶ֑יךָ כֹּ֝֗ל שַׁ֣תָּה תַֽחַת־רַגְלָֽיו׃	6 You have given them dominion over the works of your hands; you have put all things under their feet,	6 καὶ κατέστησας αὐτὸν ἐπὶ τὰ ἔργα τῶν χειρῶν σου· πάντα ὑπέταξας ὑποκάτω τῶν ποδῶν αὐτοῦ,	6 And you set him over the works of your hands; you subjected all under his feet,	8 subjecting all things under their feet.

== History of exegesis ==
The passage occupies a central place in Tertullian's Adversus Praxean.

The passage was the occasion of the break in friendship between Erasmus and Jacques Lefèvre d'Étaples. Lefèvre argued that the passage in Hebrews, although it clearly says "angels" in the Greek, should still be understood according to the original source in the Hebrew text with "lower than God", while Erasmus argued that exegesis of Hebrews 2 should follow the Septuagint of Psalm 8:5. Erasmus took the controversy to the extent of publishing seventy-two reasons why his interpretation was to be preferred.

== See also ==
- Christian angelology
- Divine filiation – Christian doctrine
- Fall of man – Adam and Eve's loss of innocence in the Abrahamic religions
- Quotations from the Hebrew Bible in the New Testament
