= Alexander Waugh (minister) =

British novelist (1898–1981)

- Born: 16 August 1754; East Gordon, Gordon, Scotland
- Died: 14 December 1827 (aged 73); Marylebone, London, England
- Resting place: Bunhill Fields
- Education: University of Edinburgh (BA); University of Aberdeen (MA), (DD)
- Spouse: Mary Neill (m. 1786)
- Children: 10
- Relatives: Arthur Waugh (great-grandson)

Alexander Waugh (16 August 1754 – 14 December 1827) was a minister in the Secession Church of Scotland, co-founder of the London Missionary Society, and one of the leading Nonconformist preachers of his day. He was the great-great-grandfather of the writers Alec Waugh and Evelyn Waugh.

== Family background ==
Alexander Waugh was born in East Gordon, Berwickshire, Scotland, on 16 August 1754, to Thomas Waugh (1706–1783), a farmer at East Gordon and third generation Covenanter, and Margaret Johnstone (1714–1789), daughter of Alexander Johnstone (b.1688), who also farmed in East Gordon, and Elizabeth Waugh (1685–1735). The Waugh family had farmed at East Gordon since at least the late 1500's, and probably earlier.

== Education ==
In 1766, Waugh attended the grammar school at Earlston where he excelled at Latin. Between 1770 - 1773, he attended Edinburgh University where he studied Latin, Greek, Logic, Moral Philosophy, Natural Philosophy, and Hebrew. Between August 1774 and 1776, he studied Divinity under the tuition of the Rev. John Brown (1722–1787) of Haddington. In 1777, he attended the University of Aberdeen (Marischal College) and was awarded a M.A. In 1815, he received the degree of Doctor of Divinity from the University of Aberdeen (Marischal College).

== Career ==
Waugh was first licensed to preach on 28 June 1779. Later that year, he was sent to London to spend ten weeks temporarily looking after the vacant congregation in the Secession Church, Wells Street, London where he proved popular. He then returned to Scotland where he took over the congregation at Newton, Roxburghshire, and was formally ordained in August 1780. On 30 May 1782, Waugh was appointed by the synod of Edinburgh to return to the congregation at Wells Street, London. He arrived in London on 14 June 1782 and remained there for the rest of his life.

During his time in London, Waugh co-founded the London Missionary Society on 22 September 1795 and was Chairman of its Examining Committee for 28 years. Waugh went on several missions on behalf of the London Missionary Society. He was in Paris during September and October 1802, Ireland in July and August 1812, and Scotland in August and September 1815 and again in 1819. Waugh was also an advocate and supporter of the Anti-Slavery Society where his friend, Thomas Pringle (1789–1834), was Secretary.

== Personal life ==
On 10 August 1786, Waugh married Mary Neill (1760–1840) in her family home at Edincrow, Coldingham, Berwickshire, Scotland, sister of John Neill (1754–1831) of 21 Surrey St., London who established a successful commodity trading business in London. They had six sons and four daughters. One of their sons was George Waugh (1801–1873), druggist to Queen Victoria and father of Fanny Waugh (1833–1866) and Edith Waugh (1846–1931) successive wives of the Pre-Raphaelite painter William Holman Hunt, and also father of Alice Waugh (1845–1912) wife of the Pre-Raphaelite sculptor Thomas Woolner. Another son, the Rev. James Hay Waugh (1797–1885), was the grandfather of Arthur Waugh, and great-grandfather of the writers Alec Waugh and Evelyn Waugh.

== Death and funeral ==
Waugh died at 6.40 a.m. on 14 December 1827 at his London house, No. 2 Salisbury Place, Marylebone, London, surrounded by his children. His funeral took place on 22 December 1827. At the beginning of the funeral procession, prayers were said by his friends, the Rev. Rowland Hill and the Rev. Edward Irving. The funeral procession began in Paddington, extending almost half a mile, consisting of forty two mourning coaches and thirteen private carriages, and ended at Bunhill Fields where Waugh was buried.

== Works ==
- Sermons, Expositions and Addresses At the Holy Communion to which is prefixed a Short Memoir of the Author (1825), published by Thomas and George Underwood, London

== Portrayals ==
The engraver Thomas Wright made a print in 1820 after a painting of Waugh by Thomas Charles Wageman

James Tassie made two relief portraits of Waugh in 1791 and 1794, wax and white glass. His nephew, William Tassie, made another portrait of Waugh at a later date.

The Scottish writer, poet, and abolitionist Thomas Pringle wrote the following poem in memory of Waugh in 1827:

'LINES TO THE MEMORY OF THE REV DR WAUGH.
by
Thomas Pringle, 1827

Whoe'er thou art whose eye may hither bend,
If thou art human, here behold a friend.
Art thou of Christ's disciples? He was one
Like him whose bosom Jesus leant upon.
Art thou a sinner burthened with thy grief?
His life was spent proclaiming sin's relief.
Art thou an unbeliever? He could feel
Much for the patient whom he could not heal.
Whatever thy station, creed, condition be,
This man of God has cared and prayed for thee.

Do riches, honours, pleasures, smile around?
He would have shown thee where alone is found
Their true enjoyment — on the Christian plan
Of holiness to God and love to man.
Are poverty, disease, disgrace, despair,
The ills, the anguish to which flesh is heir,
Thy household inmates? Yea, even such as thee
He hailed as brothers of humanity;
And gave his hand and heart, and toiled and pled,
Till nakedness was clothed and hunger fed;
Till pain was soothed, and even the fiend Despair
Confessed a stronger arm than his was there.

And ye far habitants of heathen lands,
For you he raised his voice and stretched his hands;
And taught new-wakened sympathy to start
With generous throb through many a British heart;
Till wide o'er farthest oceans waved the sail
That bade in Jesus' name the nations hail.
And Afric's wastes and wildered Hindostan
Heard the glad tidings of "good will to man."

Such was his public ministry. And they
Through life who loved him till his latest day,
Of many a noble, gentle trait can tell,
That as a man, friend, father, marked him well :
The frank simplicity; the cordial flow
Of kind affection; the enthusiast glow
That love of Nature or his Native Land
Would kindle in those eyes so bright and bland;
The unstudied eloquence that from his tongue
Fell like the fresh dews by the breezes flung
From fragrant woodlands; the benignant look
That like a rainbow beamed through his rebuke —
Rebuke more dreaded than a despot's frown,
For sorrow more than anger called it down;
The winning way, the kindliness of speech,
With which he wont the little ones to teach,
As round his chair like clustering doves they clung —
For, like his Master, much he loved the young.

These, and unnumbered traits like these, my verse
Could fondly dwell upon; but o'er his hearse
A passing wreath I may but stop to cast,
Of love and grateful reverence the last
Poor earthly token. Weeping mourners here
Perchance may count such frail memorial dear,
Though vain and valueless it be to him
Who tunes his golden harp amidst the seraphim!'

== Bibliography ==
- The Fathers and Founders of the London Missionary Society : with a Brief Sketch of Methodism, and historical notices of the several Protestant Missions, from 1556 to 1839 (Vol. 2); by Rev. John Morison D.D. Published by Fisher, Son, & Co, London p. 1-58, 1840
- A Memoir of the Reverend Alexander Waugh: With Selections From His Epistolary Correspondence, Pulpit Recollections, &c; by Rev. James Hay and the Rev. Henry Belfrage. Published by William Oliphant & Sons, Edinburgh and Hamilton, Adams, & Co, London, 1839.
- A Little Learning: the First Volume of an Autobiography; by Evelyn Waugh. Published by Chapman and Hall, London, 1964.
