= Arthur Waugh (priest) =

British Anglican priest

Arthur Thornhill Waugh (1840–1922) was an Anglican priest in the late 19th and early 20th centuries.

Waugh was born in Winchester on 23 November 1842 and educated at Christ's Hospital and Jesus College, Cambridge. He was then a master at Rossall School, during which period he was also a Curate at Thornton. He was ordained in 1867 and then held incumbencies in Elmstead and Brighton before his appointment as a Residentiary Canon at Ripon Cathedral in 1891. He was Archdeacon of Ripon from 1894 to 1905. In 1895 he was appointed Master of the Ripon Hospitals.

He died on 20 November 1922.
