= Simon P. Eggertsen Sr. House =

Historic house in Provo, Utah, United States

- Simon Peter Eggertsen Sr. House
- U.S. National Register of Historic Places
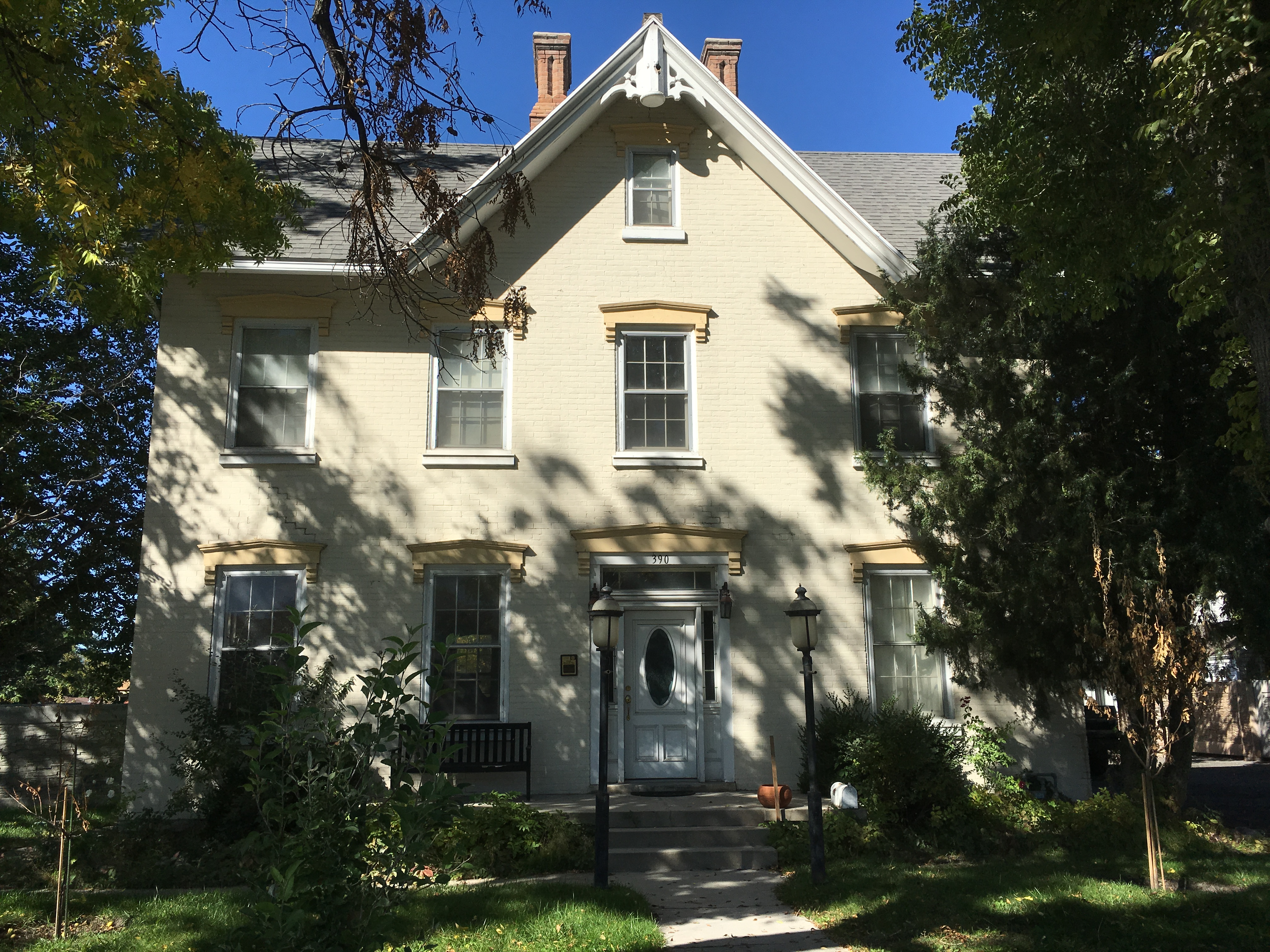

- Location within Utah Location within the United States
- Location: 390 South 500 West; Provo, Utah; United States
- Coordinates: 40°13′43″N 111°40′1″W
- Area: less than one acre
- Built: 1876
- Architect: Simon P. Eggertsen Sr.
- Architectural style: Gothic Revival, Federal, Early Gothic Revival
- NRHP reference No.: 77001321
- Added to NRHP: September 13, 1977

The Simon Peter Eggertsen Sr. House is a historic house in Provo, Utah, United States. It is listed on the National Register of Historic Places. Now it has been repaired, repainted, and appointed with appropriate furnishings of the times, this home very much depicts pioneer design and craftsmanship. The Simon Peter Eggertsen Sr. House was designated to the Provo City Historic Landmarks Registry on March 7, 1996.

== Description ==
Built in 1876, The Simon P. Eggertsen Sr. House is a 2 1/2-story brick house. The home still contains the original living room, central hall and stairway, parlor, and dining room. Since the home was first built, a kitchen and a bathroom are also included on the main floor. Three bedrooms and a bathroom, as well as two bedrooms in the attic, make up the second floor. The unfinished cellar serves as a storage unit. The inside of the home is still in great condition. “Its walnut bannisters and spindles, oak-grained woodwork and marble-grained plaster in the halls are extant, as are the fireplaces, casings, base and doors. The original room configurations and tall ceilings are also intact.”

== Simon Peter Eggertsen Sr. ==
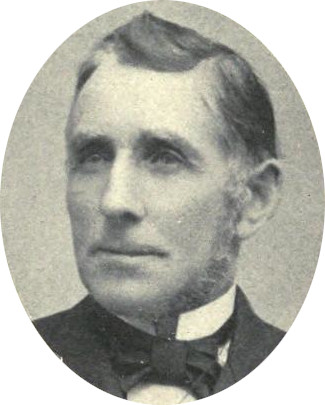
Simon P. Eggertsen (1826-1900)

Eggertsen was born in Vestr, Skevhuset, Odense County, Fyen (a Danish island), on February 7, 1826. Simon served in the army of Denmark from the year 1848 to 1850, and during that time attained the rank of a sergeant. In 1853 Eggertsen joined the Church of Jesus Christ of Latter-day Saints (LDS Church), and served as a Danish missionary until he migrated to America four years later.

Once in America, Eggertsen, along with a group of twenty four other people, traveled across 1300 miles through the Great Basin, and into Salt Lake City, arriving September 13, 1857. The following year Eggertsen married a woman named Johanne Thomson. Once Simon and his family had settled in Provo, he traded his vest and coat for the property for his future home. The Eggertsen family lived in a one-room log house for 17 years before building the Simon Peter Eggertsen Sr. House. Eggertsen took the money he had earned through his hard work as a farmer, and spent it to send his children to Brigham Young Academy (now university), and used the leftover funds to build his new home. Eggertsen, speaking of the cost of the home, said “It took 50,000 bricks to build it. The (bricks) costed me 310 dollars. The carpenter work 1,000 dollars. In the spring we moved in and felt very grateful for our blessings (Call p. 1).” The home was built by Eggertsen and some of his friends that were Danish.

After the construction of the home, Simon Peter Eggertsen served another two years in Denmark as a missionary, and supported a large family. His son - Simon Jr., owned the West Co-op and served as an educator within the county for over fifty years. The home remained in the family until 1945, after which the home belonged to Mr. And Mrs. Craig M. Call.

== See also ==
- National Register of Historic Places listings in Utah County, Utah
