= Arthur Waugh (civil servant) =

British civil servant and folkorist

Sir Arthur Allen Waugh, CIE, CSI, KCIE (1891 – 1968) was a British civil servant in India and folklorist.

== Early years and education ==
Waugh was born on 25 July 1891 and educated at George Watson’s College and the University of Edinburgh.

== Career ==
Waugh joined the Indian Civil Service in 1914 (via examination) and was gazetted to the United Provinces of British India. He was promoted to Revenue Secretary in 1934 and was made Settlement Commissioner in 1939. During the Second World War, he played an important role in overseeing the productive capacity of the United Provinces.

In 1943, Waugh was called to Delhi to be made secretary of the Central War Supply Department. In 1945, Waugh was appointed to the Executive Council of the Governor-General. He was made Companion of the Order of the Indian Empire (CIE) in 1937, Companion of the Order of the Star of India (CSI) in 1943, and Knight Commander of the Order of the Indian Empire (KCIE) in 1945.

He retired from the Indian Civil Service in 1946 and later held roles with the British Council and Salaries Commission in Ghana.

== Folklorist ==
Following his retirement, Waugh increasingly spent his time researching legendary monsters, particularly sea creatures. He joined the Folklore Society, quickly becoming a member of its Council and serving as its President from 1959 to 1961. His Presidential lectures were on the topics of the folklore of merfolk and whales, and in 1961 he co-authored Sea Enchantress: The Tale of the Mermaid and her Kin.

== Selected works ==
- Waugh, Arthur (1960) "The Folklore of the Merfolk", Folklore, 71:2, 73-84
- Waugh, Arthur (1961) "The Folklore of the Whale", Folklore, 72:2, 361-371
- Benwell, Gwen & Waugh, Arthur (1961), Sea Enchantress: The Tale of the Mermaid and her Kin. New York: Citadel Press.
