= Alec Waugh =

British novelist (1898–1981)

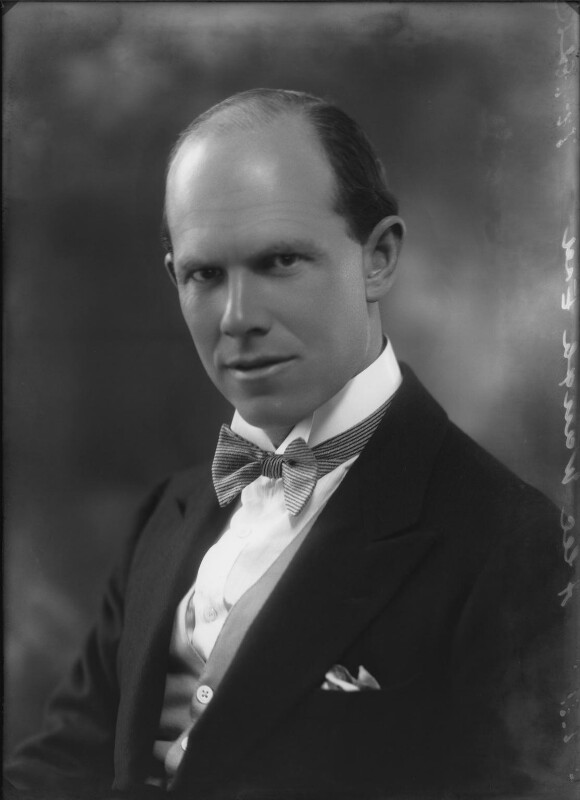
- Alec Waugh in 1931
- Born: Alexander Raban Waugh; 8 July 1898; London, England
- Died: 3 September 1981 (aged 83); Tampa, Florida, U.S.
- Resting place: St John-at-Hampstead
- Education: Sherborne School
- Spouses: Barbara Jacobs (m. 1919; div. 1923) Joan Chirnside (m. 1932; died 1969) Virginia Sorenson (m. 1969)
- Children: Andrew Alexander Waugh (1933–2006); Veronica Waugh (b. 1934); Peter Raban Waugh (1938–2014)
- Parent(s): Arthur Waugh; Catherine Charlotte Raban (1870–1954)

Alexander Raban Waugh (8 July 1898 – 3 September 1981) was a British novelist, the elder brother of the better-known Evelyn Waugh, uncle of Auberon Waugh and son of Arthur Waugh, author, literary critic and publisher. His first wife was Barbara Jacobs (1900–1996), daughter of the writer William Wymark Jacobs, his second wife was Joan Chirnside (1902–1969), and his third wife was Virginia Sorenson (1912–1991), author of the Newbery Medal-winning Miracles on Maple Hill.

== Biography ==
Waugh was born in London to Arthur Waugh (1866–1943) and Catherine Charlotte Raban, a great-granddaughter of Lord Cockburn (1779–1854). Another distinguished ancestor was his great-great-grandfather William Morgan FRS (1750–1833), a pioneer of actuarial science who served The Equitable Life Assurance Society for 56 years and who won the Copley Medal in 1789. Among ancestors bearing the Waugh name, the Rev. Alexander Waugh D.D. (1754–1827) was a minister in the Secession Church of Scotland who helped found the London Missionary Society and was one of the leading Nonconformist preachers of his day. His grandson Alexander Waugh (1840–1906) was a country medical practitioner, who bullied his wife and children and became known in the Waugh family as "the Brute". The elder of Alexander's two sons, born in 1866, was Alec's father, Arthur.

Alec was educated at Sherborne School, a public school in Dorset. The result of his experiences was his first, semi-autobiographical novel, The Loom of Youth (July 1917), in which he dramatised his schooldays. The book was inspired by Arnold Lunn's The Harrovians, published in 1913 and discussed at some length in The Loom of Youth.

The Loom of Youth was so controversial at the time (it mentioned homosexual relationships between boys, albeit in a very understated, staid fashion) that Waugh remains the only former pupil to be dismissed from the old boys' society (The Old Shirburnian Society). It was also a best seller. (The Society's website gives a different version: Alec and his father resigned and were not reinstated until 1933; while Arthur Evelyn, his younger brother went to a different school due to the dismissal of Alec). Robert Graves wrote in a letter sent from Liverpool to his friend Siegfried Sassoon, dated 9 September 1917, "That Loom of Youth book is amazingly good: I might have written it myself – no that sounds wrong but you understand: what a reckless man to write and publish it ! He is old Gosse's nephew or something and Gosse was very shy about it till he heard that it was in its fifth edition when he changed his tune." In 1932, the book was again the subject of controversy when Wyndham Lewis's Doom of Youth seemed to suggest that Waugh's interest in schoolboys was because he was a homosexual. This was settled out of court. In the mid-1960s, Waugh donated the original manuscript, press clippings and correspondence with the publisher to the Society.

Waugh served in the British army in France during the First World War, being commissioned in the Dorset Regiment in May 1917, and seeing action at Passchendaele. Captured by the Germans near Arras in March 1918, he spent the rest of the war in prisoner-of-war camps in Karlsruhe and in the Mainz Citadel. Waugh married his first wife, Barbara Annis Jacobs (1900–1996), in 1919.

He later had a career as a successful author, although never as successful or innovative as that of his younger brother. He lived much of his life overseas, in exotic places such as Tangier – a lifestyle made possible by his second marriage in 1932 to a rich Australian, Joan Chirnside, only child and heiress of Andrew Spence Chirnside (1856-1934) of Edrington, Berwick, Victoria and Vite Vite, Derrinallum, Victoria, nephew of Thomas Chirnside of Werribee Park. His work, possibly in consequence, tended to be reminiscent of W. Somerset Maugham, although without achieving Maugham's huge popular success. Nevertheless, his 1955 novel Island in the Sun was a best-seller. It was filmed in 1957 as Island in the Sun, securing from Hollywood the greatest amount ever paid for the use of a novel at that time. His 1973 novel A Fatal Gift was also a success. Despite these successes, his waggish nephew Auberon once joked that Waugh "wrote many books, each worse than the last."

Waugh served in the British army during the Second World War as an Intelligence Officer. He was posted to France (serving under Gerald Wellesley, his Hampshire neighbour), Syria, the Lebanon, Egypt, and Iraq, ending the War with the rank of Major.

He was a wine connoisseur, and published In Praise of Wine & Certain Noble Spirits (1959), a light-hearted and discursive guide to the major wine types, and Wines and Spirits, a 1968 book in the Time-Life series Foods of the World.

In 1969, Waugh married the author Virginia Sorensen, and they resided together in Morocco, then moved to the United States as his health failed. He died in Florida at the age of 83.

== Works ==
- The Loom of Youth (1917), published by Grant Richards, London (Bloomsbury Reader, 2012, ISBN 978-1-4482-0052-8)
- Resentment Poems (1918), published by Grant Richards, London
- The Prisoners of Mainz (1919), published by Chapman & Hall, London
- Pleasure (1921), published by Grant Richards, London with dust wrapper designed by John Austen (illustrator)
- Public School Life: Boys, Parents, Masters (1922), published by W Collins Sons & Co., London
- The Lonely Unicorn (1922), published by Grant Richards, London and in the USA by MacMillan Co, New York (1922) as Roland Whately
- Myself When Young: Confessions (1923), published by Grant Richards, London
- Card Castle (1924), published by Grant Richards, London and in the USA by Albert Charles Boni (1925)
- Kept: A Story of Post-War London (1925), published by Grant Richards, London and in the USA by Charles Boni (1930)
- Love In These Days: A Modern Story (1926), published by Chapman & Hall, London and in the USA by George H Doran Company, New York (1927)
- On Doing What One Likes (1926), published by The Cayme Press, Kensington, London and with dust wrapper designed by Evelyn Waugh
- Nor Many Waters (1928), published by Chapman & Hall, London and in the USA by Doubleday Doran (1929) as Portrait of a Celibate
- The Last Chukka: Stories of East and West (1928), published by Chapman & Hall, London with dust wrapper designed by Ralph Keene
- Three Score and Ten (1929), published by Chapman & Hall, London
- "...'Sir,' She Said" (1930), published by Chapman & Hall, London and in the USA by Farrar & Rinehart, New York (1930) as Love in Conflict
- The Coloured Countries (1930), published by Chapman & Hall, London and in the USA by Farrar & Rinehart, New York as Hot Countries (1930), with woodcuts by Lynd Ward
- Most Women (1931), published by Cassell & Company, London and in the USA by Farrar & Rinehart, New York, with woodcuts by Lynd Ward
- So Lovers Dream (1931), published by Cassell & Company, London with dust wrapper designed by Eric Fraser and in the USA by Farrar & Rinehart, New York (1932) as That American Woman
- No Quarter (1932), published by Cassell & Company, London with dust wrapper designed by Eric Fraser and in the USA by Farrar & Rinehart, New York (1932) as Tropic Seed
- Thirteen Such Years (1932), published by Cassell & Company, London
- Leap Before You Look (1932), published by Ernest Benn Limited, London
- Playing with Fire (1933), published by Ernest Benn Limited, London
- Wheels Within Wheels: A Story of the Crisis (1933), published by Cassell & Company, London and in the USA by Farrar & Rinehart, New York (1933) as The Golden Ripple
- The Balliols (1934), published by Cassell & Company, London with dust wrapper designed by Eric Fraser and in the USA by Farrar & Rinehart, New York (1934)
- Pages in Woman's Life (1934), published by Cassell & Company, London
- Jill Somerset (1936), published by Cassell & Company, London and in the USA by Farrar & Rinehart, New York (1936)
- Eight Short Stories (1937), published by Cassell & Company, London
- Going Their Own Ways: A Story of a Modern Marriage (1938), published by Cassell & Company, London and in the USA by Farrar & Rinehart, New York (1939)
- No Truce With Time (1941), published by Cassell & Company , London and in the USA by Farrar & Rinehart, New York
- His Second War (1944), published by Cassell & Company, London
- The Sunlit Caribbean (1948), published by Evans Brothers, London
- These Would I Choose (1948), published by Sampson Low, London
- Unclouded Summer (1948), published by Cassell & Company, London
- The Sugar Islands: A Caribbean Travelogue (1949), published by Farrar, Straus & Company, New York
- The Lipton Story (1950), published by Doubleday & Co, New York and in the UK by Cassell & Company, London (1951)
- Where the Clocks Chime Twice (1951), published by Farrar, Straus & Young, New York and in the UK by Cassell & Company, London (1952)
- Guy Renton (1952), published by Farrar, Straus & Young, New York and in the UK by Cassell & Company, London (1953)
- Island in the Sun (1955), published by Farrar, Straus & Cudahy, New York and in the UK by Cassell & Company, London (1956)
- Merchants of Wine: Being a Centenary Account of the Fortunes of the House of Gilbey (1957)
- The Sugar Islands: A Collection of Pieces Written About the West Indies Between 1928 and 1953 (1958), published by Cassell & Company, London
- Love and The Caribbean: Tales, Characters and Scenes of The West Indies (1959), published by Farrar, Straus & Cudahy, New York
- In Praise of Wine (1959), published by Cassell & Company, London and in the USA by William Sloane, New York (1959)
- Fuel for the Flame (1959), published by the Book Club, London and in the USA by Farrar, Straus & Cudahy, New York (1960) and in the UK published by Cassell & Company, London (1960)
- My Place in the Bazaar (1961), published by Cassell & Company, London and in the USA by Farrar, Straus & Cudahy (1961)
- The Early Years of Alec Waugh (1962), published by Cassell & Company, London and in the USA by Farrar, Straus & Company (1963)
- A Family of Islands: A History of the West Indies 1492 to 1898 (1964), published by Weidenfeld & Nicolson, London and in the USA by Doubleday & Company (1964)
- Mule on the Minaret (1965), published by Cassell & Company, London and in the USA by Farrar, Straus & Giroux (1965)
- My Brother Evelyn and Other Portraits (1967), published by Cassell & Company, London and in the USA by Farrar, Straus & Giroux (1967)
- Foods of the World: Wines and Spirits (1968), published by Time Life, USA
- A Spy in the Family (1970), published by W. H. Allen, London and in the USA by Farrar, Straus & Giroux (1970)
- Bangkok: The Story of a City (1970), published by W. H. Allen, London and in the USA by Little, Brown & Company, Boston (1971)
- A Fatal Gift (1973), published by W. H. Allen, London and in the USA by Farrar, Straus & Giroux (1973)
- A Year to Remember: A Reminiscence of 1931 (1975), published by W. H. Allen, London
- A Brief Encounter (1975), published by W. H. Allen, London and based on the 1974 film adaptation of the Noël Coward play, Still Life
- Married to a Spy (1976), published by W. H. Allen, London
- The Best Wine Last: An Autobiography Through the Years 1932–1969 (1978), published by W. H. Allen, London

== Filmography ==
=== Film ===
Year	Title	Role	Notes
1924	The Scarlet Woman: An Ecclesiastical Melodrama	Chiara Montefiasco	Short silent film by Evelyn Waugh
1957	Island in the Sun	Author	Based on Waugh's novel, Island in the Sun, published in 1955.
1960	Circle of Deception	Author	Based on Waugh's short story, "Small Back Room in St. Marylebone", published in Esquire magazine, 1 March 1953.

== Bibliography ==
- Fathers and Sons: The Autobiography of a Family; by Alexander Waugh, 2004.
- New York Life: Of Friends and Others; by Brendan Gill, 1994.
