= Arthur James Waugh =

British politician (1909–1995)

Arthur James Waugh (1909 – 1995) was an English politician, and the son of a railwayman.

Born in Warrington, Lancashire, his left wing political beliefs were forged early in his life when, as an apprentice fitter in Rugby, he was fired during the 1926 General Strike at 17 years of age. That experience was never forgotten and was the basis for the many years of Trade Union membership and Union activist.

He married Edith Muriel Collins (Lila) in 1935 and fathered two daughters and five sons. He left the railways in 1940 and moved to Coventry only to see the family home and all possessions destroyed in the wartime bombing within months of settling. His Union activities and membership of the local Labour Party was to propel him to being elected to the Coventry City Council in 1945.

Within 15 years he was appointed Deputy Leader of the Labour Group and leading the various committees responsible for the redevelopment of the war torn city, regarded by many as one of the chief architects of the Coventry's reconstruction.

In 1962, he was elected as Lord Mayor of Coventry. During his term, he presided at the Consecration of the Coventry Cathedral and was later made an Honorary Freeman of the City. He continued to serve as a Councillor for 45 years before retiring from active politics in 1990. A man of great political skills whose motto was "The rent of life is service."

Waugh's son, Arthur James Waugh Jr. became Lord Mayor of Coventry in 1988.

Waugh died in 1995, less than a year after the death of his wife.
