= Arthur Waugh =

British author

- Born: 27 August 1866; Midsomer Norton, England
- Died: 26 June 1943 (aged 76); Highgate, London, England
- Occupation: Writer
- Spouse: Catherine Charlotte Raban (m. 1893)
- Children: Alec Waugh; Evelyn Waugh
- Relatives: Alexander Waugh (great-grandfather)

Arthur Waugh (27 August 1866 – 26 June 1943) was an English author, literary critic and publisher. He was the father of the authors Alec Waugh and Evelyn Waugh.

== Early life ==
Waugh was born in Midsomer Norton, Somerset, in 1866, elder son of prosperous country physician Alexander Waugh (1840-1906), who bullied his wife and children and became known in the Waugh family as "the Brute", and Annie (née Morgan), of a strict Plymouth Brethren background. Waugh's mother Annie was a second cousin of Edmund Gosse, her mother, Anne, being first cousin of the naturalist Philip Henry Gosse. His great-grandfather Rev. Alexander Waugh (1754–1827) was a minister in the Secession Church of Scotland who helped found the London Missionary Society and was one of the leading Nonconformist preachers of his day.

He was educated at Sherborne School, Sherborne, Dorset, and New College, Oxford, where he won the Newdigate Prize for Poetry for a ballad on the subject of Gordon of Khartoum in 1888.

== Career ==
In 1892, he wrote the first biography of the poet Alfred Tennyson, which was published by William Heinemann. In 1894, he contributed to the first issue of the magazine The Yellow Book and again in 1895 to the sixth issue. In 1899, he wrote the rhymes for a children's book with illustrations by William Nicholson. In 1900, Waugh wrote and published Robert Browning, a brief biography of the author of the same name. He was also a regular correspondent for the magazine The New York Critic, and from 1906 to 1931, he was a literary critic for the London newspaper The Daily Telegraph.

His published works include poetry, biographies, literary criticism, and an autobiography, titled One Man's Road, published in 1931.

From 1902 to 1930, he was the Managing Director and Chairman of the publishing house Chapman and Hall, about which he wrote a detailed history titled A Hundred Years in Publishing in 1930.

== Personal life ==
In 1893, Waugh was married to Catherine Charlotte "Kate" Raban (1870–1954), a great-granddaughter of Lord Cockburn (1779–1854). Together, they were the parents of two sons:

- Alexander Raban Waugh (1898–1981), a novelist who married three times.
- Arthur Evelyn St. John Waugh (1903–1966), a novelist who married twice.

Waugh befriended Elizabeth Myers the novelist and short storywriter, encouraging her to continue writing and publishing.

He died at his home in Highgate, in greater London, England, on 26 June 1943. Fourteen volumes of his diaries covering the period of 1930 to his death are held in the Boston University Library.

== Works ==
- Gordon in Africa; winner of the 1888 Newdigate Prize, published by A. Thomas Shrimpton & Son, Oxford, 1888
- Alfred Lord Tennyson: A Study of His Life and Work; published by William Heinemann, London, 1892
- Reticence in Literature; The Yellow Book, Vol.I April 1894, Page 201
- The Auction Room of Letters; The Yellow Book, Vol.VI July 1895, Page 257
- The Square Book of Animals; published by William Heinemann, London, 1900 and illustrated by William Nicolson
- Robert Browning; published as part of The Westminster Biographies series by Kegan Paul, Trench, Trubner and Co, London, 1900
- Reticence In Literature And Other Papers; published by J G Wilson, London, 1915
- Tradition and Change: Studies in Contemporary Literature; published by Chapman and Hall, London, 1919
- A Hundred Years of Publishing, Being the Story of Chapman & Hall; published by Chapman and Hall, London, 1930
- One Man's Road: being a Picture of Life in a Passing Generation; published by Chapman and Hall, London, 1931.

== Bibliography ==
- One Man's Road: being a Picture of Life in a Passing Generation by Arthur Waugh, 1931.
- My Father: Arthur Waugh in "The Early Years of Alec Waugh" by Alec Waugh, 1962.
- Fathers and Sons: The Autobiography of a Family by Alexander Waugh, 2004.
